= List of places in Carmarthenshire (categorised) =

This is a categorised list of places in the County of Carmarthenshire, Wales.

== Administrative divisions ==
=== Electoral wards ===
This is a list of electoral wards:

- Abergwili
- Ammanford
- Betws
- Bigyn
- Burry Port
- Bynea
- Carmarthen Town North
- Carmarthen Town South
- Carmarthen Town West
- Cenarth
- Cilycwm
- Cynwyl Elfed
- Cynwyl Gaeo
- Dafen
- Elli
- Felinfoel
- Garnant
- Glanamman
- Glanymor
- Glyn
- Gorslas
- Hendy
- Hengoed
- Kidwelly
- Laugharne Township
- Llanboidy
- Llanddarog
- Llandeilo
- Llandovery
- Llandybie
- Llanegwad
- Llanfihangel Aberbythych
- Llanfihangel-ar-Arth
- Llangadog
- Llangeler
- Llangennech
- Llangunnor
- Llangyndeyrn
- Llannon
- Llansteffan
- Llanybydder
- Lliedi
- Llwynhendy
- Manordeilo and Salem
- Pembrey
- Pen-y-groes
- Pontamman
- Pontyberem
- Quarter Bach
- Saron
- St Clears
- St. Ishmael
- Swiss Valley
- Trelech
- Trimsaran
- Tycroes
- Tyisha
- Whitland

=== Communities ===
This is a complete list of the 72 communities in Carmarthenshire.

- Abergwili
- Abernant
- Ammanford
- Betws
- Bronwydd
- Carmarthen
- Cenarth
- Cilycwm
- Cilymaenllwyd
- Cwmamman
- Cyngor Bro Dyffryn Cennen
- Cynwyl Elfed
- Cynwyl Gaeo
- Eglwyscummin
- Gorslas
- Henllanfallteg
- Kidwelly
- Laugharne Township
- Llanarthney
- Llanboidy
- Llanddarog
- Llanddeusant
- Llanddowror
- Llandeilo
- Llandovery
- Llandybie
- Llandyfaelog
- Llanedi
- Llanegwad
- Llanelli
- Llanelli Rural
- Llanfair-ar-y-bryn
- Llanfihangel Aberbythych
- Llanfihangel Rhos-y-Corn
- Llanfihangel-ar-Arth
- Llanfynydd
- Llangadog
- Llangain
- Llangathen
- Llangeler
- Llangennech
- Llangunnor
- Llangyndeyrn
- Llangynin
- Llangynog
- Llanllawddog
- Llanllwni
- Llannon
- Llanpumsaint
- Llansadwrn
- Llansawel
- Llansteffan
- Llanwinio
- Llanwrda
- Llanybydder
- Llanycrwys
- Manordeilo and Salem
- Meidrim
- Myddfai
- Newcastle Emlyn
- Newchurch and Merthyr
- Pembrey and Burry Port Town
- Pencarreg
- Pendine
- Pontyberem
- Quarter Bach
- St. Clears
- St. Ishmael
- Talley
- Trelech
- Trimsaran
- Whitland

== Notable places ==
=== Principal towns ===
See also List of places in Carmarthenshire for an alphabetical list of towns and villages.

- Ammanford
- Burry Port
- Carmarthen (county town)
- Kidwelly
- Llandeilo
- Llandovery
- Llanelli (largest settlement)
- St. Clears
- Whitland

=== Archaeological sites ===
- Carreg Cennen Castle
- Dolaucothi Gold Mines
- Kidwelly Castle
- Laugharne Castle
- Llansteffan Castle
- Talley Abbey

=== Parks ===
- Aberglasney Garden
- Millennium Coastal Park
- National Botanic Garden of Wales
- Pembrey Country Park
- WWT National Wetlands Centre

== Cultural venues ==
=== Museums ===
- Dylan Thomas Boathouse
- Kidwelly Industrial Museum
- Pendine Museum of Speed

== Sporting venues ==
=== Stadia ===
- Ffos Las racecourse
- Parc y Scarlets sports stadium, Pemberton, home of Scarlets and Llanelli RFC (capacity: 14,340)
- Pembrey Race Circuit
- Richmond Park sports stadium, Carmarthen (seating: 500)
- Stradey Park sports stadium, Llanelli (capacity: 10,800, seatied: 4,649)
- Stebonheath Park Multi-Use Sports Stadium, home of Llanelli A.F.C., Llanelli (capacity: 3,700, seated: 700)

=== Golf courses ===
- Ashburnham Golf Club, Burry Port
- Carmarthen Golf Club, Carmarthen
- Derllys Court Golf Club, Bancyfelin
- Garnant Park Golf Club, Garnant
- Glanhir Golf Club, Llandyfan
- Glyn Abbey Golf Club, Carway
- Machynys Peninsula Golf & Country Club, Machynys

== Geographical ==
=== Beaches ===
- Cefn Sidan
- Marros Sands
- Pendine Sands

=== Rivers and waterways ===
- afon lledi
- Afon Cymin
- Afon Cywyn
- Afon Gwili
- Afon Tâf
- Afon Teifi
- Afon Aman
- Gwendraeth Fach
- Gwendraeth Fawr
- River Loughor
- River Tywi
- Usk Reservoir

=== Country parks and nature reserves ===
- Brechfa Forest
- Pembrey Country Park
- WWT National Wetlands Centre

== Transport ==
=== Cycle routes ===
- Celtic Trail (NCR route 47)
  - Millennium Coastal Path

=== Major roads ===
- M4 motorway
- A48 road
- A483 road

=== Railway lines ===
- Amman Valley Railway
- Heart of Wales Line
- West Wales Line
- Gwili Railway
- Teifi Valley Railway

=== Railway stations ===
see Category:Railway stations in Carmarthenshire

=== Airports ===
- Pembrey Airport
