= List of places in Carmarthenshire =

Map of places in Carmarthenshire compiled from this list
See the list of places in Wales for places in other principal areas.

This is a list of cities, towns and villages in the principal area of Carmarthenshire, Wales.

== A ==
Aber-arad, Abercrychan, Aber-giar, Abergorlech, Abergwili, Abernant, Alltwalis, Ammanford

== B ==
Bancffosfelen, Bancycapel, Bancyfelin, Bethlehem, Betws, Blaenycoed (or Blaen-y-coed; partially in Carmarthenshire), Blaenwaun, Brechfa, Bronwydd, Bryn, Brynamman, Burry Port, Bynea

== C ==
Caeo or Caio, Capel Dewi, Capel Hendre, Capel Iwan, Carmarthen, Carmel, Carway, Castell-y-Garreg, Cefncaeau, Cefneithin, Cenarth, Cilycwm, Cross Hands, Crugybar, Crwbin, Cwmamman, Cwmann, Cwmbach, Cwmduad, Cwmcarnhywel, Cwmfelin Boeth, Cwmffrwd, Cwmgwili (Bronwydd), Cwmgwili (Llandybie), Cwmhiraeth, Cwmisfael, Cwmmawr, Cwmpengraig, Cynghordy, Cynwyl Elfed, Cynwyl Gaeo

== D ==
Dafen, Derwydd, Drefach, Dre-fach Felindre, Dryslwyn, Dyffryn Cennen

== E ==
Edwinsford, Eglwyscummin

== F ==
Felinfoel, Felindre, Felingwm Isaf, Felingwm Uchaf, Ferryside, Ffarmers, Fforest, Five Roads, Foelgastell

== G ==
Garnant, Glanamman, Gorslas, Gwernogle, Gwyddgrug, Gwynfe

== H ==
Harford, Hendy, Henllan Amgoed, Henllanfallteg, Hiraeth, Horeb

== I ==
Idole

== K ==
Kidwelly

== L ==
Laugharne, Llanarthney, Llanboidy, Llandawke, Llanddarog, Llanddeusant, Llanddowror, Llandeilo, Llandovery, Llandre, Llandybie, Llandyfaelog, Llandysul, Llanedi (Llanedy), Llanegwad, Llanelli, Llanfair-ar-y-bryn, Llanfallteg, Llanfallteg West, Llanfihangel Aberbythych, Llanfihangel ar Arth, Llanfihangel Rhos-y-Corn, Llanfihangel-uwch-Gwili, Llanfynydd, Llangadog, Llangain, Llangathen, Llangeler, Llangennech, Llanglydwen, Llangunnor, Llangyndeyrn, Llangynin, Llanllawddog, Llanllwch, Llanllwni, Llanmiloe, Llannon, Llanpumsaint, Llansadurnen, Llansadwrn, Llansaint, Llansawel, Llansteffan, Llanwinio, Llanwrda, Llanybri, Llanybydder, Llwynhendy

== M ==
Maesybont, Manordeilo and Salem, Marros, Meidrim, Myddfai, Mynyddcerrig, Mynydd-y-Garreg

== N ==
Nantgaredig, Nantycaws, Newcastle Emlyn (partially in Carmarthenshire), Newchurch and Merthyr, New Inn

== P ==
Pantyffynnon, Parc y Rhos, Pemberton, Pembrey and Burry Port Town, Pencader, Pencarreg, Penceilogi, Pendine, Peniel, Penrhiwgoch, Pensarn, Pentrecwrt, Pentregwenlais, Pen-y-graig, Pen-y-groes, Plashett, Pontantwn, Pont-ar-Gothi, Pontarsais, Ponthenri, Pontwelli, Pontyates, Pontyberem, Porthyrhyd, Pumsaint, Pwll, Pwll Trap

== Q ==
Quarter Bach

== R ==
Red Roses, Rhandirmwyn, Rhos, Rhosamman, Rhydargaeau, Rhydcymerau,

== S ==
Sandy, Saron, St Clears, St Ishmael, Stradey, Swiss Valley

== T ==
Talley, Talog, Trap (Trapp), Trelech, Trimsaran, Tumble, Tycroes

== U ==
Upland Arms, Upper Brynamman

== W ==
Whitland

== See also ==
- List of places in Carmarthenshire (categorised)
