= Carmarthen East and Dinefwr (UK Parliament constituency) =

UK Parliament constituency (1997–2024)

Coordinates: 51°56′N 4°06′W

- Former county constituency for the House of Commons
- Boundary of Carmarthen East and Dinefwr in Wales
- Preserved county: Dyfed
- Population: 71,046 (2011 census)
- Electorate: 54,557 (December 2010)
- Major settlements: Carmarthen (part), Ammanford, Llandeilo, Llandovery

1997–2024
- Seats: One
- Created from: Carmarthen, Llanelli
- Senedd: Carmarthen East and Dinefwr, Mid and West Wales

Carmarthen East and Dinefwr (Welsh: Dwyrain Caerfyrddin a Dinefwr) was a constituency of the House of Commons of the Parliament of the United Kingdom last represented since 2010 by Jonathan Edwards of Plaid Cymru. It elected one Member of Parliament (MP) by the first past the post system of election. It was created in 1997, mostly from the former seat of Carmarthen.

The Carmarthen East and Dinefwr Senedd constituency was created with the same boundaries in 1999 (as an Assembly constituency).

The constituency was abolished as part of the 2023 Periodic Review of Westminster constituencies and under the June 2023 final recommendations of the Boundary Commission for Wales. Its wards were divided between Caerfyrddin (Carmarthen) and Llanelli.

== Boundaries ==
Map of boundaries 2010-2024

The constituency was within the Carmarthenshire authority area, with Llanybydder, Llandovery and Llanfihangel-ar-Arth in the north, Llanfihangel-uwch-Gwili, Llanegwad, and Llandeilo in the central area, and Ammanford and Glanamman in the south.

Boundary changes for the 2010 general election introduced minor alterations, with the areas around Hermon and Llanpumsaint removed to the Carmarthen West and South Pembrokeshire constituency. These changes came into effect in 2007 for the National Assembly for Wales.

The constituency includes the whole of 41 Carmarthenshire communities (Abergwili; Ammanford; Betws; Cenarth; Cilycwm; Cwmamman; Cynwyl Gaeo; Dyffryn Cennen; Gorslas; Llanarthney; Llanddarog; Llanddeusant; Llandeilo; Llandovery; Llandybie; Llandyfaelog; Llanegwad; Llanfair-ar-y-bryn; Llanfihangel Aberbythych; Llanfihangel-ar-Arth; Llanfihangel Rhos-y-Corn; Llanfynydd; Llangadog; Llangathen; Llangeler; Llangunnor; Llangyndeyrn; Llanllawddog; Llanllwni; Llansadwrn; Llansawel; Llanwrda; Llanybydder; Llanycrwys; Manordeilo and Salem; Myddfai; Newcastle Emlyn; Pencarreg; Quarter Bach; St Ishmael; Talley).

== Members of Parliament ==
Election	Member	Party
1997	Alan Williams	Labour
2001	Adam Price	Plaid Cymru
2010	Jonathan Edwards	Plaid Cymru
2020	Jonathan Edwards	Independent
2024	Constituency abolished	

== Elections ==
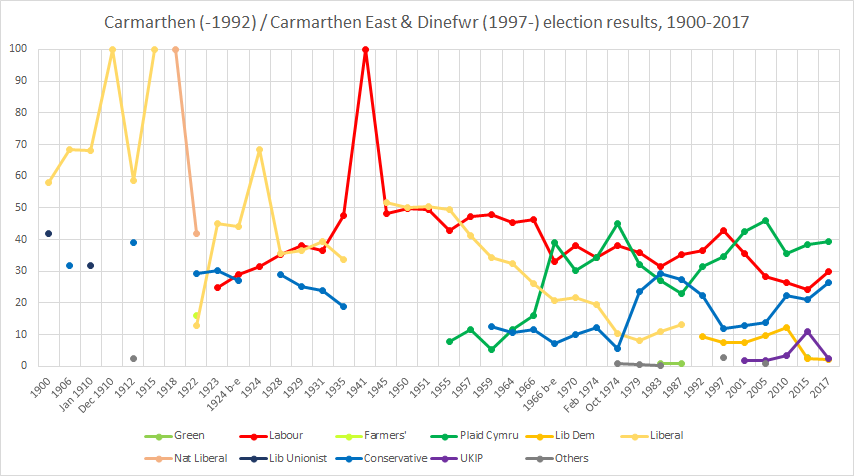
Carmarthen - Carmarthen East and Dinefwr election results

=== Elections in the 1990s ===
General election 1997: Carmarthen East and Dinefwr
Party	Candidate	Votes	%	±%
Labour	Alan Williams	17,907	42.9	N/A
Plaid Cymru	Rhodri Glyn Thomas	14,457	34.6	N/A
Conservative	Edmund Hayward	5,022	12.0	N/A
Liberal Democrats	Juliana Hughes	3,150	7.5	N/A
Referendum	Ian Humphreys-Evans	1,196	2.9	N/A
Majority		3,450	8.3	N/A
Turnout		32,654	78.6	N/A
Registered electors		53,121		
Labour win (new seat)				

=== Elections in the 2000s ===
General election 2001: Carmarthen East and Dinefwr
Party	Candidate	Votes	%	±%
Plaid Cymru	Adam Price	16,130	42.4	+7.8
Labour	Alan Williams	13,540	35.6	−7.3
Conservative	David Thomas	4,912	12.9	+0.9
Liberal Democrats	Doiran Evans	2,815	7.4	−0.1
UKIP	Michael Squires	656	1.7	N/A
Majority		2,590	6.8	N/A
Turnout		38,053	70.4	−8.2
Registered electors		54,035		
Plaid Cymru gain from Labour		Swing	+7.5	

General election 2005: Carmarthen East and Dinefwr
Party	Candidate	Votes	%	±%
Plaid Cymru	Adam Price	17,561	45.9	+3.5
Labour	Ross Hendry	10,843	28.3	−7.3
Conservative	Suzy Davies	5,235	13.7	+0.8
Liberal Democrats	Juliana Hughes	3,719	9.7	+2.3
UKIP	Mike Squires	661	1.7	±0.0
Legalise Cannabis	Sid Whitworth	272	0.7	N/A
Majority		6,718	17.6	+10.8
Turnout		38,291	71.6	+1.2
Registered electors		53,091		
Plaid Cymru hold		Swing	+5.4	

=== Elections in the 2010s ===
General election 2010: Carmarthen East and Dinefwr
Party	Candidate	Votes	%	±%
Plaid Cymru	Jonathan Edwards	13,546	35.6	−10.2
Labour	Christine Gwyther	10,065	26.5	−1.8
Conservative	Andrew Morgan	8,506	22.4	+8.7
Liberal Democrats	William Powell	4,609	12.1	+2.4
UKIP	John Atkinson	1,285	3.4	+1.7
Majority		3,481	9.1	−8.3
Turnout		38,011	72.6	+1.8
Registered electors		52,385		
Plaid Cymru hold		Swing	-4.2	

General election 2015: Carmarthen East and Dinefwr
Party	Candidate	Votes	%	±%
Plaid Cymru	Jonathan Edwards	15,140	38.4	+2.8
Labour	Calum Higgins	9,541	24.2	−2.3
Conservative	Matthew Paul	8,336	21.2	−1.2
UKIP	Norma Woodward	4,363	11.1	+7.7
Green	Ben Rice	1,091	2.8	N/A
Liberal Democrats	Sara Lloyd Williams	928	2.4	−9.7
Majority		5,599	14.2	+5.1
Turnout		39,399	70.9	−1.7
Registered electors		55,750		
Plaid Cymru hold		Swing	+2.5	

General election 2017: Carmarthen East and Dinefwr
Party	Candidate	Votes	%	±%
Plaid Cymru	Jonathan Edwards	16,127	39.3	+0.9
Labour	David Darkin	12,219	29.8	+5.6
Conservative	Havard Hughes	10,778	26.3	+5.1
UKIP	Neil Hamilton	985	2.4	−8.7
Liberal Democrats	Lesley Prosser	920	2.2	−0.2
Rejected ballots		65		
Majority		3,908	9.5	−4.7
Turnout		41,029	73.3	+2.4
Registered electors		56,711		
Plaid Cymru hold		Swing	-2.3	

Of the 65 rejected ballots:

- 44 were either unmarked or it was uncertain who the vote was for.
- 14 voted for more than one candidate.
- 7 had writing or a mark by which the voter could be identified.

General election 2019: Carmarthen East and Dinefwr
Party	Candidate	Votes	%	±%
Plaid Cymru	Jonathan Edwards	15,939	38.9	−0.4
Conservative	Havard Hughes	14,130	34.5	+8.2
Labour	Maria Carroll	8,622	21.0	−8.8
Brexit Party	Peter Prosser	2,311	5.6	N/A
Rejected ballots		145		
Majority		1,809	4.4	−5.1
Turnout		41,002	71.4	−1.9
Registered electors		57,407		
Plaid Cymru hold		Swing	-4.3	

Of the 145 rejected ballots:

- 123 were either unmarked or it was uncertain who the vote was for.
- 20 voted for more than one candidate.
- 2 had writing or a mark by which the voter could be identified.

Edwards was elected as a Plaid Cymru MP, but had the whip withdrawn by the party after he was arrested on suspicion of assault in May 2020.

== See also ==
- Carmarthen East and Dinefwr (Senedd constituency)
- List of parliamentary constituencies in Dyfed
- List of parliamentary constituencies in Wales
