= Carmarthen East and Dinefwr (Senedd constituency) =

Senedd constituency (1999–2026)

Coordinates: 51°56′N 4°06′W

Carmarthen East and Dinefwr Dwyrain Caerfyrddin a Dinefwr
- Former Senedd county constituency for the Senedd

- Carmarthen East and Dinefwr shown within the Mid and West Wales electoral region and the region shown within Wales

Former Senedd county constituency
- Created: 1999
- Abolished: 2026
- Party: Plaid Cymru
- MS: Adam Price
- Preserved county: Dyfed

Carmarthen East and Dinefwr (Welsh: Dwyrain Caerfyrddin a Dinefwr) was a constituency of the Senedd. It elected one Member of the Senedd by the first past the post method of election. It was one of eight constituencies in the Mid and West Wales electoral region, which elected four additional members, in addition to eight constituency members, to produce a degree of proportional representation for the region as a whole.

It had been held since its formation in 1999 by the Plaid Cymru politician, Rhodri Glyn Thomas until his retirement in 2016. It was last held by Plaid Cymru politician Adam Price, who became leader of the party in 2018.

== Boundaries ==
Map of 2007–2026 boundaries

=== 1999 to 2007 ===
The constituency was created for the first election to the Assembly, in 1999, with the name and boundaries of the Carmarthen East and Dinefwr Westminster constituency. It was a Dyfed constituency, one of five constituencies covering, and entirely within, the preserved county of Dyfed.

The other four Dyfed constituencies were Carmarthen West and South Pembrokeshire, Ceredigion, Llanelli and Preseli Pembrokeshire. They were all within the Mid and West Wales electoral region.

The region consisted of the eight constituencies of Brecon and Radnorshire, Carmarthen East and Dinefwr, Carmarthen West and South Pembrokeshire, Ceredigion, Llanelli, Meirionnydd Nant Conwy, Montgomeryshire and Preseli Pembrokeshire.

=== From 2007 ===
The constituency included the whole of 41 Carmarthenshire communities (Abergwili; Ammanford; Betws; Cenarth; Cilycwm; Cwmamman; Cynwyl Gaeo; Dyffryn Cennen; Gorslas; Llanarthney; Llanddarog; Llanddeusant; Llandeilo; Llandovery; Llandybie; Llandyfaelog; Llanegwad; Llanfair-ar-y-bryn; Llanfihangel Aberbythych; Llanfihangel-ar-Arth; Llanfihangel Rhos-y-Corn; Llanfynydd; Llangadog; Llangathen; Llangeler; Llangunnor; Llangyndeyrn; Llanllawddog; Llanllwni; Llansadwrn; Llansawel; Llanwrda; Llanybydder; Llanycrwys; Manordeilo and Salem; Myddfai; Newcastle Emlyn; Pencarreg; Quarter Bach; St Ishmael; Talley).

Boundaries changed for the 2007 Assembly election. Carmarthen East and Dinefwr remains one of five Dyfed constituencies and one of eight constituencies in the Mid and West Wales region. However, boundaries within Dyfed changed, to realign them with local government ward boundaries and to reduce the disparities in the sizes of constituency electorates, and the boundaries of the region changed, to align them with the boundaries of preserved counties.

The other four Dyfed constituencies were, again, Carmarthen West and South Pembrokeshire, Ceredigion, Llanelli and Preseli Pembrokeshire, all within the Mid and West Wales electoral region.

The region consisted of the constituencies of Brecon and Radnorshire, Carmarthen East and Dinefwr, Carmarthen West and South Pembrokeshire, Ceredigion, Dwyfor Meirionnydd, Llanelli, Montgomeryshire and Preseli Pembrokeshire.

For Westminster purposes, the same new constituency boundaries became effective for the 2010 United Kingdom general election.

== Voting ==
In general elections for the Senedd, each voter had two votes. The first vote was used to vote for a candidate to become the Member of the Senedd for the voter's constituency, elected by the first past the post system. The second vote was used to vote for a regional closed party list of candidates. Additional member seats were allocated from the lists by the d'Hondt method, with constituency results being taken into account in the allocation.

== Assembly members and Members of the Senedd ==
Election	Member	Party
1999	Rhodri Glyn Thomas	Plaid Cymru
2016	Adam Price	Plaid Cymru

== Elections ==
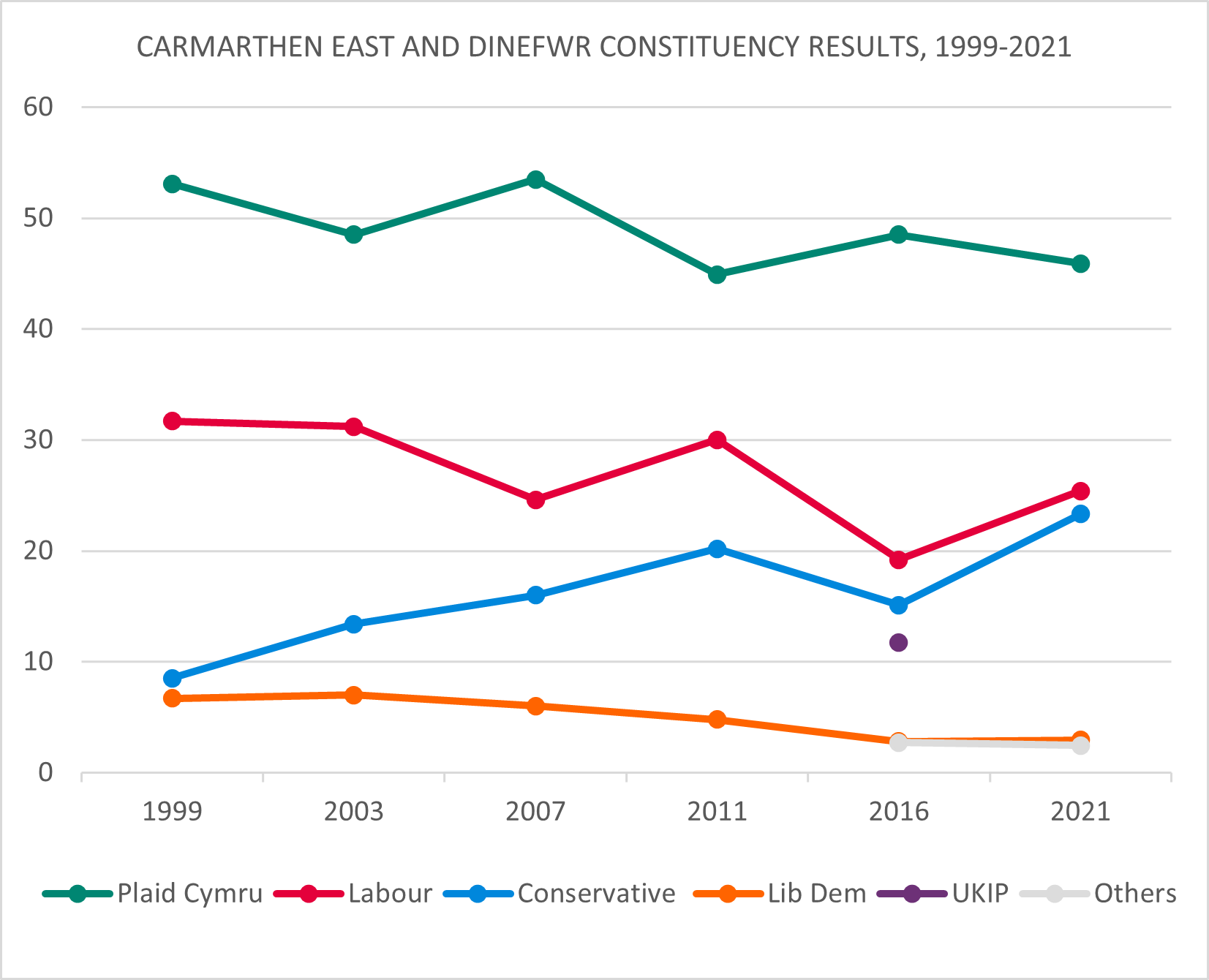
Election results since 1999 (parties who never got >5% counted as others)

=== Elections in the 2020s ===
2021 Senedd election: Carmarthen East and Dinefwr
Party	Candidate	Constituency			Regional		
Party	Candidate	Votes	%	±%	Votes	%	±%
Plaid Cymru	Adam Price (Note: Incumbent member for this constituency)	15,261	45.9	-2.6	13,403	40.0	-3.2
Labour	Robert James	8,448	25.41	+6.2	8,531	25.5	+5.5
Conservative	Havard Hughes	7,751	23.31	+8.2	7,125	21.3	+6.8
Liberal Democrats	Monica French	975	2.93	+0.1	732	2.2	-0.9
Reform	Karl Pollard	818	2.46	New	350	1.0	New
Green					1,320	3.9	+1.2
Abolish					785	2.3	-1.0
UKIP					508	1.5	-9.9
Christian					174	0.5	New
Freedom Alliance (UK)					163	0.5	New
Gwlad					154	0.5	New
Propel					128	0.4	New
Communist					92	0.3	+0.1
TUSC					26	0.1	New
Majority		6,813	20.48	−8.8			
Turnout		33,253	51.94	−1.8			
Plaid Cymru hold		Swing					

=== Elections in the 2010s ===
Welsh Assembly Election 2016: Carmarthen East and Dinefwr
Party	Candidate	Constituency			Regional		
Party	Candidate	Votes	%	±%	Votes	%	±%
Plaid Cymru	Adam Price	14,427	48.5	+3.6	12,825	43.2	+3.2
Labour	Steve Jeacock	5,727	19.2	-10.8	5,930	20.0	-6.6
Conservative	Matthew Paul	4,489	15.1	-5.1	4,288	14.5	-3.2
UKIP	Neil Hamilton	3,474	11.7	New	3,393	11.4	+7.6
Liberal Democrats	William Powell	837	2.8	-2.0	919	3.1	-0.8
Green	Freya Amsbury	797	2.7	New	787	2.7	-1.2
Abolish					973	3.3	New
People First (Wales)					159	0.5	New
Monster Raving Loony					122	0.4	New
Welsh Christian					116	0.4	-0.3
Association of Welsh Independents					83	0.3	New
Communist					68	0.2	-0.1
Majority		8,700	29.3	+14.4			
Turnout		29,751	53.7	+2.4			
Plaid Cymru hold		Swing	+7.2				

Welsh Assembly Election 2011: Carmarthen East and Dinefwr
Party	Candidate	Constituency			Regional		
Party	Candidate	Votes	%	±%	Votes	%	±%
Plaid Cymru	Rhodri Glyn Thomas	12,501	44.9	-8.6	11,129	40.0	-4.3
Labour	Antony Jones	8,353	30.0	+5.4	7,419	26.6	+5.1
Conservative	Henrietta Hensher	5,635	20.2	+4.2	4,941	17.7	+3.0
Liberal Democrats	Will Griffiths	1,339	4.8	-1.2	1,085	3.9	-0.4
Green					1,088	3.9	-0.3
UKIP					1,058	3.8	+0.6
Socialist Labour					470	1.7	+0.6
BNP					392	1.4	-1.2
Welsh Christian					194	0.7	0.0
Communist					71	0.3	0.0
Majority		4,148	14.9	−14.0			
Turnout		27,828	51.3	−3.6			
Plaid Cymru hold		Swing	-7.1				

Regional ballots rejected: 132

=== Elections in the 2000s ===
Welsh Assembly Election 2007: Carmarthen East and Dinefwr
Party	Candidate	Constituency			Regional		
Party	Candidate	Votes	%	±%	Votes	%	±%
Plaid Cymru	Rhodri Glyn Thomas	15,655	53.5	+5.0	12,956	44.3	+3.2
Labour	Kevin Madge	7,186	24.6	-6.6	6,282	21.5	-7.6
Conservative	Henrietta Hensher	4,676	16.0	+2.6	4,292	14.7	+2.6
Liberal Democrats	Ian Walton	1,752	6.0	-1.0	1,244	4.3	-2.6
Green					1,219	4.2	-+0.4
UKIP					948	3.2	+0.8
BNP					756	2.6	New
Gwynoro Jones - Independent					423	1.4	New
Caroline Evans - Independent					390	1.3	New
Socialist Labour					321	1.1	New
Welsh Christian					194	0.7	New
Communist					91	0.3	New
Veritas					79	0.3	New
CPA					40	0.1	New
Majority		8,469	28.9	+11.6			
Turnout		29,269	55.7	+6.2			
Plaid Cymru hold		Swing	+5.9				

Welsh Assembly Election 2003: Carmarthen East and Dinefwr
Party	Candidate	Constituency			Regional		
Party	Candidate	Votes	%	±%	Votes	%	±%
Plaid Cymru	Rhodri Glyn Thomas	12,969	48.5	-4.6	11,021	41.1	-12.1
Labour	Anthony Cooper	8,355	31.2	-0.5	7,810	29.1	+3.8
Conservative	Harri Lloyd Davies	3,576	13.4	+4.9	3,253	12.1	+2.4
Liberal Democrats	Steffan John	1,866	7.0	+0.3	1,859	6.9	+0.9
Green					1,018	3.8	Unknown
Mid and West Wales Pensioners					848	3.2	New
UKIP					644	2.4	New
Cymru Annibynnol					188	0.7	New
Vote 2 Stop the War					103	0.4	New
Prolife Alliance					51	0.2	New
Majority		4,614	17.3	−4.1			
Turnout		26,766	49.5	−11.5			
Plaid Cymru hold		Swing	-2.1				

2003 Electorate: 54,110
Regional ballots rejected: 239

=== Elections in the 1990s ===
Welsh Assembly Election 1999: Carmarthen East and Dinefwr
Party	Candidate	Constituency			Regional		
Party	Candidate	Votes	%	±%	Votes	%	±%
Plaid Cymru	Rhodri Glyn Thomas	17,328	53.1	N/A	17,469	53.3	N/A
Labour	Chris Llewelyn	10,348	31.7	N/A	8,253	25.3	N/A
Conservative	Helen Stoddart	2,776	8.5	N/A	3,168	9.7	N/A
Liberal Democrats	Juliana Hughes	2,202	6.7	N/A	1,961	6.0	N/A
Other list parties					1,782	5.5	N/A
Majority		6,980	21.4				
Turnout		32,654	61.0				
Plaid Cymru win (new seat)							
