= List of United Kingdom locations: Llanf-Llann =

The United Kingdom

This is part of the list of United Kingdom locations: a gazetteer of place names in the United Kingdom showing each place's locality and geographical coordinates.

== Llan (continued) ==
=== Llanf ===
| Location | Locality | Coordinates (links to map & photo sources) | OS grid reference |
|---|---|---|---|
| Llanfabon | Caerphilly | 51.62°N 03.30°W | ST1093 |
| Llanfach | Caerphilly | 51.64°N 03.12°W | ST2295 |
| Llanfachraeth | Isle of Anglesey | 53.30°N 04.53°W | SH3182 |
| Llanfachreth | Gwynedd | 52.78°N 03.85°W | SH7522 |
| Llanfaelog | Isle of Anglesey | 53.22°N 04.50°W | SH3373 |
| Llanfaes | Powys | 51.94°N 03.41°W | SO0328 |
| Llanfaes | Isle of Anglesey | 53.27°N 04.10°W | SH6077 |
| Llanfaethlu | Isle of Anglesey | 53.34°N 04.54°W | SH3186 |
| Llanfaglan | Gwynedd | 53.11°N 04.28°W | SH4760 |
| Llanfair | Gwynedd | 52.83°N 04.12°W | SH5729 |
| Llanfair Caereinion | Powys | 52.64°N 03.33°W | SJ1006 |
| Llanfair Clydogau | Ceredigion | 52.14°N 04.01°W | SN6251 |
| Llanfair Dyffryn Clwyd | Denbighshire | 53.08°N 03.30°W | SJ1355 |
| Llanfairfechan | Conwy | 53.24°N 03.97°W | SH6874 |
| Llanfair Kilgeddin | Monmouthshire | 51.75°N 02.95°W | SO3407 |
| Llanfair-Nant-Gwyn | Pembrokeshire | 52.006°N 04.675°W | SN1637 |
| Llanfair Pwllgwyngyll | Isle of Anglesey | 53.21°N 04.20°W | SH5371 |
| Llanfair Talhaiarn | Conwy | 53.21°N 03.61°W | SH9270 |
| Llanfair Waterdine | Shropshire | 52.37°N 03.11°W | SO2476 |
| Llanfair-Ym-Muallt | Powys | 52.14°N 03.41°W | SO0350 |
| Llanfairyneubwll | Isle of Anglesey | 53.25°N 04.55°W | SH3076 |
| Llanfairynghornwy | Isle of Anglesey | 53.38°N 04.52°W | SH3290 |
| Llanfallteg | Carmarthenshire | 51.83°N 04.68°W | SN1519 |
| Llanfallteg West | Carmarthenshire | 51.83°N 04.70°W | SN1419 |
| Llanfaredd | Powys | 52.14°N 03.37°W | SO0650 |
| Llanfarian | Ceredigion | 52.37°N 04.08°W | SN5877 |
| Llanfechain | Powys | 52.77°N 03.21°W | SJ1820 |
| Llanfechell | Isle of Anglesey | 53.39°N 04.46°W | SH3691 |
| Llanferres | Denbighshire | 53.13°N 03.22°W | SJ1860 |
| Llanfflewyn | Isle of Anglesey | 53.37°N 04.48°W | SH3589 |
| Llanfigael | Isle of Anglesey | 53.30°N 04.52°W | SH3282 |
| Llanfihangel-ar-arth | Carmarthenshire | 52.02°N 04.26°W | SN4539 |
| Llanfihangel Glyn Myfyr | Conwy | 53.02°N 03.50°W | SH9949 |
| Llanfihangel-helygen | Powys | 52.26°N 03.40°W | SO0464 |
| Llanfihangel Nant Bran | Powys | 51.99°N 03.54°W | SN9434 |
| Llanfihangel-nant-Melan | Powys | 52.21°N 03.20°W | SO1858 |
| Llanfihangel Penbedw | Pembrokeshire | 52.02°N 04.62°W | SN2039 |
| Llanfihangel Rhydithon | Powys | 52.28°N 03.24°W | SO1566 |
| Llanfihangel Rogiet | Monmouthshire | 51.57°N 02.79°W | ST4587 |
| Llanfihangel Tal-y-llyn | Powys | 51.94°N 03.29°W | SO1128 |
| Llanfihangel-uwch-Gwili | Carmarthenshire | 51.87°N 04.20°W | SN4822 |
| Llanfihangel-y-Creuddyn | Ceredigion | 52.36°N 03.96°W | SN6676 |
| Llanfihangel-yng-Ngwynfa | Powys | 52.73°N 03.36°W | SJ0816 |
| Llanfihangel yn Nhowyn | Isle of Anglesey | 53.26°N 04.52°W | SH3277 |
| Llanfihangel-y-pennant (Abergynolwyn) | Gwynedd | 52.65°N 03.96°W | SH6708 |
| Llanfihangel-y-pennant (Cwm Pennant) | Gwynedd | 52.98°N 04.20°W | SH5244 |
| Llanfihangel-y-traethau | Gwynedd | 52.89°N 04.09°W | SH5935 |
| Llanfilo | Powys | 51.98°N 03.29°W | SO1133 |
| Llanfoist | Monmouthshire | 51.81°N 03.04°W | SO2813 |
| Llanfor | Gwynedd | 52.91°N 03.59°W | SH9336 |
| Llanfrechfa | Torfaen | 51.63°N 02.99°W | ST3193 |
| Llanfrothen | Gwynedd | 52.94°N 04.05°W | SH6241 |
| Llanfrynach | Powys | 51.91°N 03.35°W | SO0725 |
| Llanfwrog | Isle of Anglesey | 53.32°N 04.55°W | SH3084 |
| Llanfwrog | Denbighshire | 53.10°N 03.33°W | SJ1157 |
| Llanfyllin | Powys | 52.76°N 03.27°W | SJ1419 |
| Llanfynydd | Carmarthenshire | 51.92°N 04.11°W | SN5527 |
| Llanfynydd | Flintshire | 53.09°N 03.09°W | SJ2756 |
| Llanfyrnach | Pembrokeshire | 51.94°N 04.59°W | SN2231 |

=== Llang ===
| Location | Locality | Coordinates (links to map & photo sources) | OS grid reference |
|---|---|---|---|
| Llangadfan | Powys | 52.67°N 03.46°W | SJ0110 |
| Llangadog (Kidwelly) | Carmarthenshire | 51.73°N 04.28°W | SN4207 |
| Llangadog (community) | Carmarthenshire | 51.93°N 03.89°W | SN7028 |
| Llangadwaladr | Isle of Anglesey | 53.19°N 04.42°W | SH3869 |
| Llangadwaladr | Powys | 52.86°N 03.21°W | SJ1830 |
| Llangaffo | Isle of Anglesey | 53.18°N 04.33°W | SH4468 |
| Llangain | Carmarthenshire | 51.81°N 04.35°W | SN3815 |
| Llangammarch Wells | Powys | 52.11°N 03.56°W | SN9347 |
| Llangan | The Vale Of Glamorgan | 51.48°N 03.51°W | SS9577 |
| Llangarron | Herefordshire | 51.88°N 02.69°W | SO5221 |
| Llangasty-Talyllyn | Powys | 51.92°N 03.26°W | SO1326 |
| Llangathen | Carmarthenshire | 51.87°N 04.06°W | SN5822 |
| Llangattock | Powys | 51.84°N 03.14°W | SO2117 |
| Llangattock Lingoed | Monmouthshire | 51.87°N 02.93°W | SO3620 |
| Llangattock-Vibon-Avel | Monmouthshire | 51.83°N 02.79°W | SO4515 |
| Llangedwyn | Powys | 52.80°N 03.21°W | SJ1824 |
| Llangefni | Isle of Anglesey | 53.24°N 04.30°W | SH4675 |
| Llangeinor | Bridgend | 51.57°N 03.57°W | SS9187 |
| Llangeitho | Ceredigion | 52.21°N 04.03°W | SN6159 |
| Llangeler | Carmarthenshire | 52.02°N 04.37°W | SN3739 |
| Llangelynnin / Llangelynin | Gwynedd | 52.64°N 04.11°W | SH5707 |
| Llangendeirne / Llangyndeyrn | Carmarthenshire | 51.80°N 04.24°W | SN4514 |
| Llangennech | Carmarthenshire | 51.68°N 04.09°W | SN5501 |
| Llangennith | Swansea | 51.59°N 04.28°W | SS4291 |
| Llangenny | Powys | 51.84°N 03.10°W | SO2417 |
| Llangernyw | Conwy | 53.18°N 03.69°W | SH8767 |
| Llangeview | Monmouthshire | 51.69°N 02.88°W | SO3900 |
| Llangian | Gwynedd | 52.82°N 04.53°W | SH2928 |
| Llangloffan | Pembrokeshire | 51.94°N 05.05°W | SM9032 |
| Llanglydwen | Carmarthenshire | 51.90°N 04.64°W | SN1826 |
| Llangoed | Isle of Anglesey | 53.28°N 04.10°W | SH6079 |
| Llangoedmor | Ceredigion | 52.07°N 04.62°W | SN2045 |
| Llangollen | Denbighshire | 52.96°N 03.17°W | SJ2141 |
| Llangolman | Pembrokeshire | 51.90°N 04.74°W | SN1126 |
| Llangorse / Langors | Powys | 51.93°N 03.26°W | SO1327 |
| Llangorwen | Ceredigion | 52.42°N 04.06°W | SN6083 |
| Llangovan | Monmouthshire | 51.74°N 02.79°W | SO4505 |
| Llangower | Gwynedd | 52.87°N 03.63°W | SH9032 |
| Llangranog / Llangrannog | Ceredigion | 52.15°N 04.47°W | SN3154 |
| Llangristiolus | Isle of Anglesey | 53.23°N 04.35°W | SH4373 |
| Llangrove | Herefordshire | 51.86°N 02.69°W | SO5219 |
| Llangua | Monmouthshire | 51.92°N 02.88°W | SO3925 |
| Llangunllo | Powys | 52.33°N 03.16°W | SO2171 |
| Llangunnor | Carmarthenshire | 51.85°N 04.28°W | SN4320 |
| Llangurig | Powys | 52.39°N 03.61°W | SN9079 |
| Llangwm | Pembrokeshire | 51.74°N 04.91°W | SM9909 |
| Llangwm | Monmouthshire | 51.69°N 02.84°W | SO4200 |
| Llangwm | Conwy | 52.98°N 03.55°W | SH9644 |
| Llangwnnadl | Gwynedd | 52.85°N 04.67°W | SH2032 |
| Llangwyfan | Denbighshire | 53.18°N 03.33°W | SJ1166 |
| Llangwyllog | Isle of Anglesey | 53.28°N 04.35°W | SH4379 |
| Llangwyryfon | Ceredigion | 52.31°N 04.06°W | SN5970 |
| Llangybi | Ceredigion | 52.15°N 04.04°W | SN6053 |
| Llangybi | Monmouthshire | 51.65°N 02.91°W | ST3796 |
| Llangybi | Gwynedd | 52.94°N 04.35°W | SH4241 |
| Llangyfelach | Swansea | 51.66°N 03.96°W | SS6498 |
| Llangyndeyrn / Llangendeirne | Carmarthenshire | 51.80°N 04.24°W | SN4514 |
| Llangynhafal | Denbighshire | 53.15°N 03.31°W | SJ1263 |
| Llangynidr | Powys | 51.86°N 03.23°W | SO1519 |
| Llangyniew | Powys | 52.66°N 03.30°W | SJ1208 |
| Llangynin | Carmarthenshire | 51.84°N 04.54°W | SN2519 |
| Llangynog | Carmarthenshire | 51.81°N 04.42°W | SN3316 |
| Llangynog | Powys | 52.82°N 03.41°W | SJ0526 |
| Llangynwyd | Bridgend | 51.57°N 03.64°W | SS8688 |

=== Llanh ===
| Location | Locality | Coordinates (links to map & photo sources) | OS grid reference |
|---|---|---|---|
| Llanhamlach | Powys | 51.92°N 03.32°W | SO0926 |
| Llanharan | Rhondda, Cynon, Taff | 51.53°N 03.44°W | ST0083 |
| Llanharry | Rhondda, Cynon, Taff | 51.51°N 03.44°W | ST0080 |
| Llanhennock | Monmouthshire | 51.62°N 02.94°W | ST3592 |
| Llanhilleth | Blaenau Gwent | 51.69°N 03.14°W | SO2100 |
| Llanhowell / Llanhowel / Llanhywel | Pembrokeshire | 51.89°N 05.18°W | SM8127 |

=== Llani ===
| Location | Locality | Coordinates (links to map & photo sources) | OS grid reference |
|---|---|---|---|
| Llanidloes | Powys | 52.44°N 03.54°W | SN9584 |
| Llaniestyn | Gwynedd | 52.86°N 04.58°W | SH2633 |
| Llanifyny | Powys | 52.41°N 03.67°W | SN8681 |
| Llanigon | Powys | 52.05°N 03.15°W | SO2140 |
| Llanilar | Ceredigion | 52.35°N 04.02°W | SN6275 |
| Llanion | Pembrokeshire | 51.68°N 04.93°W | SM9703 |
| Llanishen | Cardiff | 51.52°N 03.19°W | ST1781 |
| Llanishen | Monmouthshire | 51.72°N 02.76°W | SO4703 |

=== Llanl ===
| Location | Locality | Coordinates (links to map & photo sources) | OS grid reference |
|---|---|---|---|
| Llanllechid | Gwynedd | 53.19°N 04.06°W | SH6268 |
| Llanllowell | Monmouthshire | 51.67°N 02.88°W | ST3998 |
| Llanllugan | Powys | 52.60°N 03.40°W | SJ0502 |
| Llanllwch | Carmarthenshire | 51.83°N 04.35°W | SN3818 |
| Llanllwchaiarn | Powys | 52.51°N 03.31°W | SO1192 |
| Llanllwni | Carmarthenshire | 52.02°N 04.20°W | SN4939 |
| Llanllwyd | Shropshire | 52.42°N 03.19°W | SO1981 |
| Llanllyfni | Gwynedd | 53.03°N 04.28°W | SH4751 |

=== Llanm ===
| Location | Locality | Coordinates (links to map & photo sources) | OS grid reference |
|---|---|---|---|
| Llanmadoc | Swansea | 51.61°N 04.25°W | SS4493 |
| Llanmaes | Cardiff | 51.47°N 03.26°W | ST1276 |
| Llan-maes | The Vale Of Glamorgan | 51.41°N 03.46°W | SS9869 |
| Llanmartin | City of Newport | 51.59°N 02.88°W | ST3989 |
| Llanmerewig | Powys | 52.51°N 03.25°W | SO1592 |
| Llanmihangel | The Vale Of Glamorgan | 51.42°N 03.46°W | SS9871 |
| Llan-mill | Pembrokeshire | 51.79°N 04.69°W | SN1414 |
| Llanmiloe | Carmarthenshire | 51.74°N 04.53°W | SN2508 |
| Llanmorlais | Swansea | 51.62°N 04.12°W | SS5394 |

=== Llann ===
| Location | Locality | Coordinates (links to map & photo sources) | OS grid reference |
|---|---|---|---|
| Llannefydd | Conwy | 53.21°N 03.52°W | SH9870 |
| Llannerch-y-môr | Flintshire | 53.30°N 03.24°W | SJ1779 |
| Llan-non | Ceredigion | 52.28°N 04.18°W | SN5167 |
| Llannon | Carmarthenshire | 51.75°N 04.13°W | SN5308 |
| Llannor | Gwynedd | 52.90°N 04.45°W | SH3537 |
