= Carmarthen East and Dinefwr =

Carmarthen East and Dinefwr may refer to:

- Carmarthen East and Dinefwr (UK Parliament constituency), 1997–2024
- Carmarthen East and Dinefwr (Senedd constituency), 1999-2026
