= Llanfihangel =

Llanfihangel (English: St Michael's Church) can refer to the following places in Wales:

- Llanfihangel Aberbythych, Carmarthenshire
- Llanfihangel-ar-Arth, Carmarthenshire
- Llanfihangel-ar-Elái, the Welsh name for Michaelston-super-Ely, Cardiff
- Llanfihangel Bachellaeth, Gwynedd
- Llanfihangel-clogwyn-gofan, the Welsh name for Bosherston, Pembrokeshire
- Llanfihangel Court, a Tudor house in Monmouthshire
- Llanfihangel Crucorney, Monmouthshire
- Llanfihangel Dyffryn Arwy, the Welsh name for Michaelchurch-on-Arrow, Powys
- Llanfihangel Genau'r Glyn, the former name for Llandre, Ceredigion
- Llanfihangel Glyn Myfyr, Conwy
- Llanfihangel Llantarnam, the full Welsh name for Llantarnam, Torfaen
- Llanfihangel Nant Brân, Powys
- Llanfihangel Nant Melan, Powys
- Llanfihangel Penbedw, a former parish in the Hundred of Kilgerran, Pembrokeshire
- Llanfihangel Rhos-y-Corn, Carmarthenshire
- Llanfihangel Rhydithon, Powys
- Llanfihangel Talyllyn, Powys
- Llanfihangel Tor-y-Mynydd, Monmouthshire
- Llanfihangel Tre'r Beirdd, Isle of Anglesey
- Llanfihangel y Bont-faen, the Welsh name for Llanmihangel, Vale of Glamorgan
- Llanfihangel y Creuddyn, Ceredigion
- Llanfihangel-y-gofion, Monmouthshire, known in English as Llanvihangel Gobion
- Llanfihangel-yng-Ngwynfa, in Llanfihangel ward, Powys
- Llanfihangel yn Nhowyn, Isle of Anglesey
- Llanfihangel-yn-y-grug, the former name for Llanrug, Gwynedd
- Llanfihangel-y-Pennant, a community in Meirionnydd, Gwynedd
- Llanfihangel-y-Pennant, Dolbenmaen, a village in the community of Dolbenmaen, Gwynedd
- Llanfihangel Ysgeifiog, Isle of Anglesey
- Llanfihangel Ystrad, Ceredigion
- Llanfihangel Ystum Llewern, Monmouthshire
- Llanfihangel-y-traethau, a former parish in Ardudwy, Gwynedd
