= William Augustus =

William Augustus may refer to:

- Prince William, Duke of Cumberland (1721–1765)
- William Augustus (translator), 18th-century weather forecaster and translator
- William Augustus, Duke of Brunswick-Harburg (1564–1642)
