= Talley Lakes =

Two lakes in Carmarthenshire, Wales

Coordinates: 51.9817°N 3.995°W

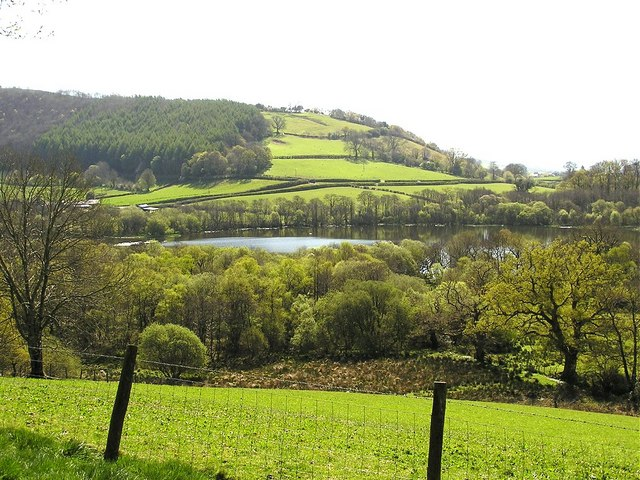
- Lower Talley Lake
- Interactive map of Talley Lakes
- Location: Carmarthenshire, Wales

Upper Talley Lake (Welsh: Llyn Talyllychau Uchaf) and Lower Talley Lake (Welsh: Llyn Talyllychau Isaf) are two small lakes immediately north of the village of Talley, 7 miles (11 km) north of Llandeilo in Carmarthenshire, Wales. They are protected as a Site of Special Scientific Interest (SSSI).

== Morphology ==
The lakes occupy a glacial hollow that formed during the last ice age, the intervening ground being formed from hummocky glacial deposits. Lower Talley Lake to the north is almost 16 acres (6.5 ha) and Upper Talley Lake to the south is 27 acres (11 ha). The SSSI has an area of 62 acres (25 ha).

== History ==
The earthworks of a Norman motte-and-bailey castle occupy the neck of land between the two lakes. The remains of the castle motte (mound) are 30 metres (98 ft) in diameter and 4 metres (13 ft) high and would have originally have been topped by a timber framed defensive tower. The surrounding bailey would have enclosed the lord's hall and related buildings. The castle probably fell out of use when Talley Abbey was established.

Talley Abbey is immediately to the south of the upper lake, and was founded between 1184 and 1189. The monks used the lakes for farming fish. The abbey was dissolved in the sixteenth century and is now a ruin.

== Mythology ==
There is a tradition that a drowned town lies under the lakes.

== Natural history ==
The lower lake is surrounded by alder and willow woods and is not easily accessible. It is used by overwintering wildfowl. The upper lake is more open and can be seen from the B4302 road.

Great crested grebes and mute swans regularly breed on the reserve. Regular visiting birds include tufted ducks, pochards, goldeneye ducks and goosanders.

Water plants in the lower lake include yellow and white water lilies and water crowfoot. This is the most southerly British location of the water sedge.

Invertebrates in the reserve include water beetles and the leaf beetle Donacia obscura. Dragonflies are commonly seen including the emperor dragonfly.

== See also ==
- List of Sites of Special Scientific Interest in Carmarthen & Dinefwr
