= Llansawel transmitting station =

Llansawel
- Mast height: 17 metres (56 ft)
- Coordinates: 52°00′46″N 4°00′52″W
- Grid reference: SN618368
- Built: 1986
- Relay of: Carmel
- BBC region: BBC Wales
- ITV region: ITV Cymru Wales

The Llansawel television relay station is sited on high ground to the north of the village of Llansawel in Carmarthenshire, South Wales. It was originally built in 1986 as a fill-in relay for UHF analogue television. It consists of a 17 m wooden telegraph pole standing on a hillside which is itself about 160 m above sea level. The transmissions are beamed southwards. The Llansawel transmission station is owned and operated by Arqiva.

Llansawel transmitter is classed as an indirect off-air relay of Carmel. It re-radiates a signal received off-air from Talley about five km to the southeast, which itself is a direct off-air relay of Carmel. When it came, the digital switchover process for Llansawel duplicated the timing at Carmel with the first stage taking place on 26 August 2009 and with the second stage being completed on 23 September 2009. After the switchover process, analogue channels had ceased broadcasting permanently and the Freeview digital TV services were radiated at an ERP of 2 W each.

== Channels listed by frequency ==
=== Analogue television ===
==== Spring/Summer 1986 - 26 August 2009 ====
Llansawel entered service in late spring/early summer 1986, and (being in Wales) transmitted the S4C variant of Channel 4.

Frequency	UHF	kW	Service
479.25 MHz	22	0.006	BBC One Wales
503.25 MHz	25	0.006	ITV1 Wales (HTV Wales until 2002)
527.25 MHz	28	0.006	BBC Two Wales
559.25 MHz	32	0.006	S4C

=== Analogue and digital television ===
==== 26 August 2009 - 23 September 2009 ====
The UK's digital switchover commenced at Carmel (and therefore at Llansawel and all its other relays) on 26 August 2009. Analogue BBC Two Wales on channel 28 was first to close, and was replaced by the new digital BBC A mux which started up in 64-QAM and at full power (i.e. 2 W).

Frequency	UHF	kW	Service	System
479.25 MHz	22	0.006	BBC One Wales	PAL System I
503.25 MHz	25	0.006	ITV1 Wales	PAL System I
530.000 MHz	28	0.002	BBC A	DVB-T
559.25 MHz	32	0.006	S4C	PAL System I

=== Digital television ===
==== 23 September 2009 - present ====
The remaining analogue TV services were closed down and the digital multiplexes took over on the original analogue channels' frequencies.

Frequency	UHF	kW	Operator
482.000 MHz	22	0.002	BBC B
506.000 MHz	25	0.002	Digital 3&4
530.000 MHz	28	0.002	BBC A
