= Banc y Betws =

Castle remains in Carmarthenshire, Wales

Coordinates: 51°48′59″N 4°14′16″W

Banc y Betws or Betws Castle, is a motte and scheduled ancient monument in Wales. It is located in Llangyndeyrn, in the Gwendraith Valley in Carmarthenshire, Wales. All that is visible of the structure nowadays is a mound capped with trees and the remains of the ditch that surrounded it.

== History ==
The Normans introduced motte-and-bailey castles from France to countries such as Britain, where the technology was adopted by the Welsh people. The largest clustering of these in Britain is in the Welsh Marches: namely Shropshire, Cheshire, Herefordshire, Powys and Flintshire. The greatest numbers of these castles were built in Wales between the 11th century and the second half of the 12th century, built out of soil and stone, usually surrounded by a ditch and topped with a wooden or stone structure known as a keep. The history of this particular castle is not known.

== The site ==
Betws Castle is a mound approximately 40 metres by 35 metres, and roughly 9 metres high. The top of the mound is concave, with the centre about 1 metre (3 ft) lower than the rim. A dry ditch, approximately 5 metres wide and two metres deep, surrounds the site except on the north side, where it has been filled in. The eastern face of the mound was damaged by quarrying in the mid-twentieth century. The Historic Environment Record for the castles indicates that the site has not been archaeologically excavated and does not mention any recorded history.

The castle is registered with Cadw, number CM124. Some of the ditch to the north has been incorporated into the adjoining field and the motte itself is clad in large trees.
