= Dunbia =

Meat processing company based in Dungannon, Northern Ireland

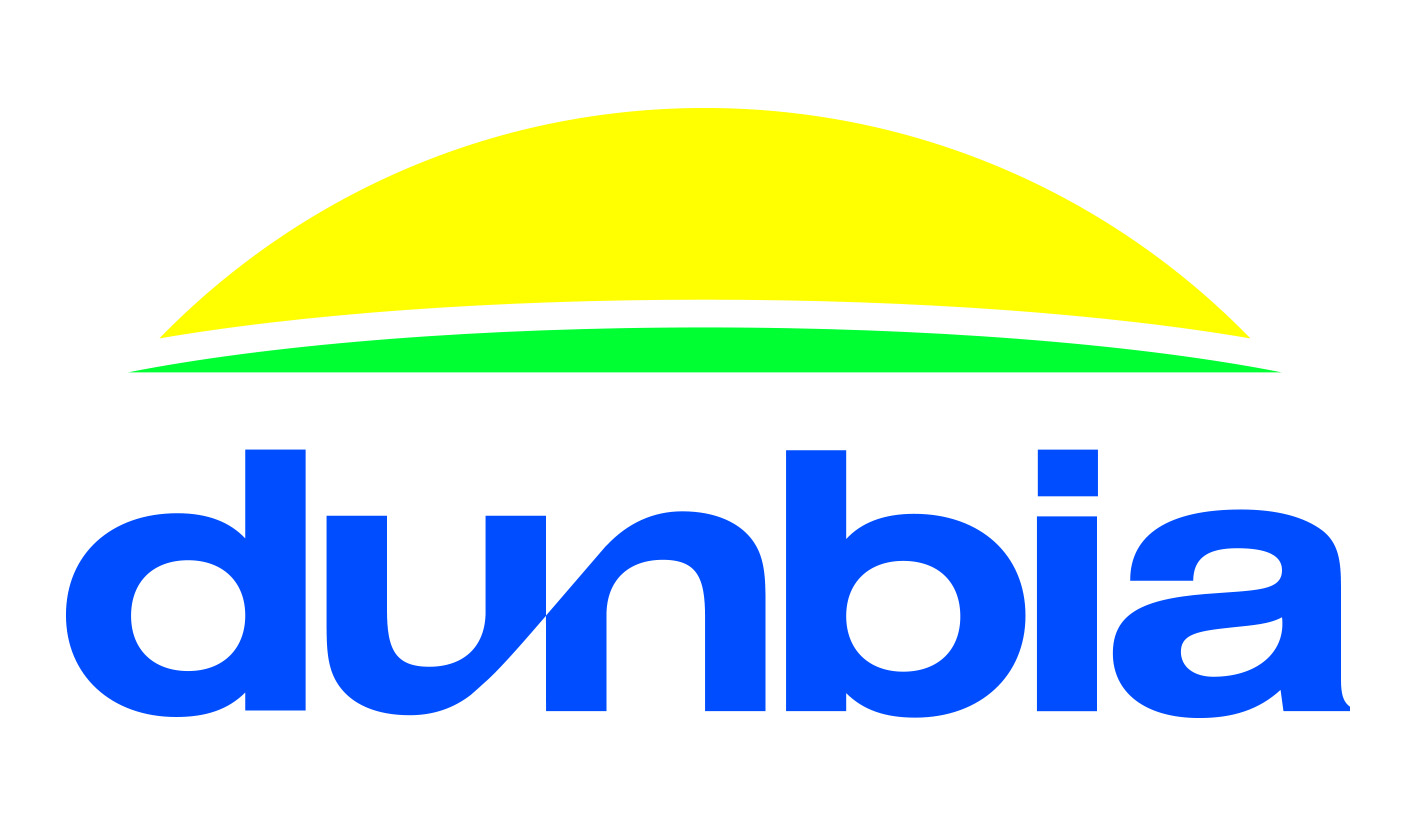
Dunbia logo

Dunbia, founded in 1976 as Dungannon Meats and headquartered in Dungannon, Northern Ireland, is a red meat processor that sources and manufactures beef, lamb and pork products for retail, commercial and foodservice markets locally, nationally and internationally. It is a division of Dawn Meats.

== Operations ==
Ten abattoirs collectively employ 3,200 staff at Dungannon, Ballymena, Preston, Northern Ireland, Sawley, Northern Ireland, Llanybydder, Nantmel, Kilbeggan, Slane, Maganey and Elgin. Dunbia is devoted to improving the environment aspect of the company and they are currently working to environmental management systems throughout all the Dunbia sites.

== History ==
The history of Dunbia is as follows:

- 2020 - Dawn Meats take full control of the business
- 2017 - Dunbia enter joint venture with Dawn Meats in the UK
- 2014 - Acquires Lynch Quality Meats in Ayr, Scotland
- 2013 - Opens factory facilities in Felinfach, Wales
- 2013 - Acquires G Wood & Sons, Mansfield
- 2011 - Takes over Heathfield Foods Ltd in Crewe, England
- 2009 - Acquires Stevenson's & Co Pork Facility in Cullybackey, Northern Ireland
- 2007 - Acquires Rhinds of Elgin in North East of Scotland
- 2007 - Acquires Kepak in Preston, England
- 2006 - Group rebranded to become ‘Dunbia’
- 2006 - New European sales office opened in Paris
- 2003 - Acquired a new boning facility for Dunbia (Kilbeggan)
- 2001 - Dunbia (Kilbeggan) acquired along with sister company Dunbia (Slane)
- 2001 - Dunbia (Llanybydder) acquired from Oriel Jones & Sons
- 1998 - Dunbia (Sawley) acquired from Rose County Foods
- 1996 - Major extension doubling the capacity of Retail Packing Factory at Dungannon
- 1993 - Built a retail packing factory at Dungannon
- 1990 - Opened extensive new boning facility at Dungannon
- 1985 - Built slaughter facility at Dungannon
- 1983 - Moved to new boning facility at Dungannon
- 1976 - Opened butchers shop in small village near Dungannon
