= Cwmifor =

Village in Carmarthenshire, Wales

Coordinates: 51°54′47″N 3°57′01″W

Cwmifor is a small village in Carmarthenshire. It is a part of the Manordeilo and Salem community and is located between Llandeilo and Llandovery, near the A40.

The village consists of a number of dispersed farmhouses, most of which were built in the eighteenth and nineteenth centuries. In the twentieth century, a number of small houses were built near to the A40, transforming the village into a 'small nucleated settlement'.

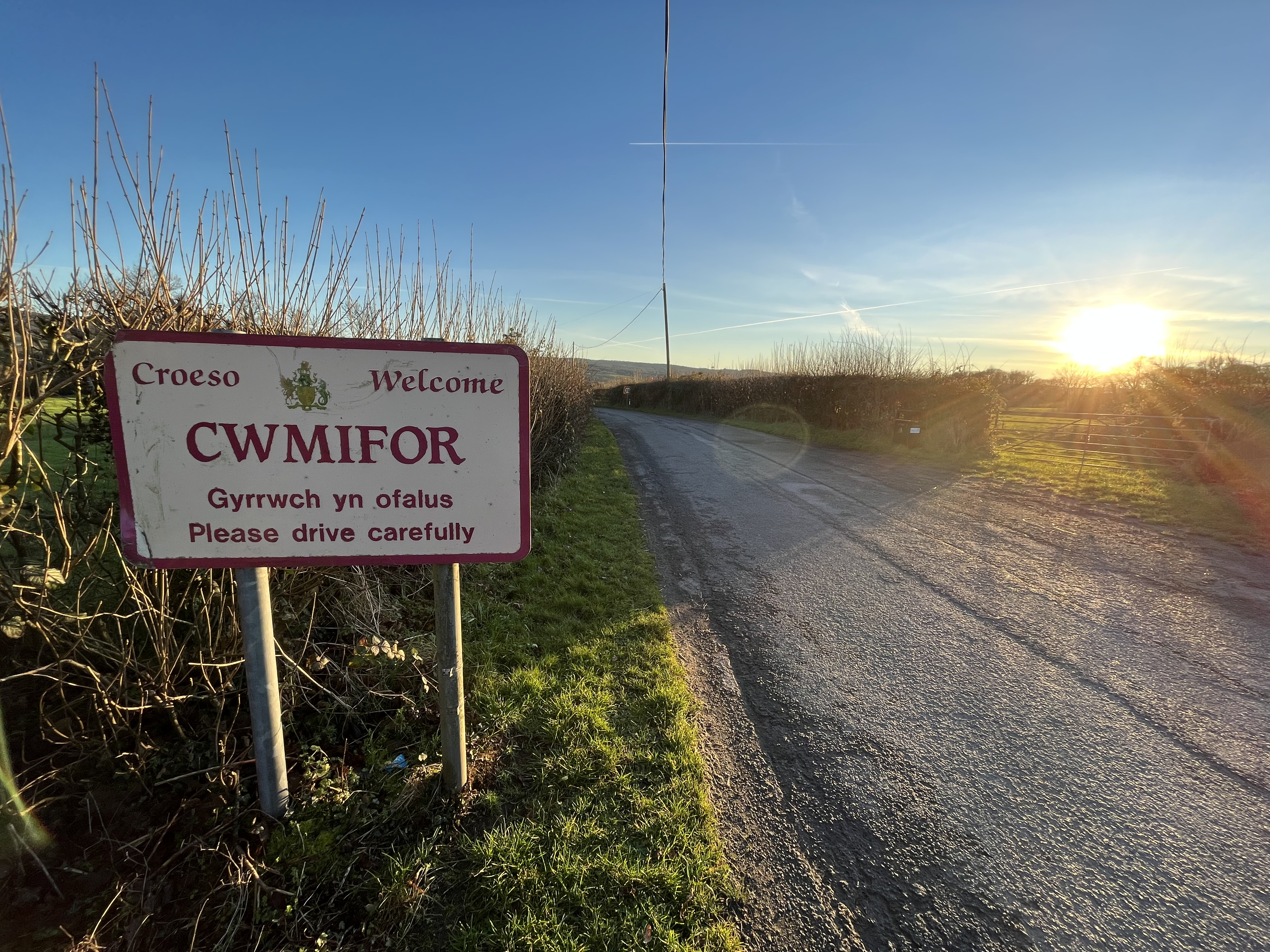
Southbound sign, entering Cwmifor village

== History ==
It is likely that the name Cwmifor derived from a person's name ('Cwm Ifor' means "Ifor's Valley"). An extensive Neolithic (4000–2200 BC) occupation site comprising numerous pits and post-holes, with finds of burnt bone, flints and charcoal, was recorded at Cwmifor.

A Roman road known as the Via Julia ran east to west at the northern extremity of the settlement. A turnpike road was established in the eighteenth century and followed the line of the Roman road although the course through Cwmifor was straightened under Thomas Telford in the 1820s.

A meeting of a group of Rebecca Rioters took place in graveyard of village's Baptist Chapel in 1843 and was reported in The Times. This is one of the few meetings of the Rebecca Rioters infiltrated by the press.

The village remained a dispersed settlement into the 1880s, with an Ordnance Survey map from 1886 showing a public house, a parish church, and a Baptist chapel. Several prominent farms and houses are also named on the map, many of which remain today (Cae Mawr, Pen-y-Waen, and Penhill).

In 2002, Carmarthenshire Council earmarked the village primary school for closure. According to one report, the school had twenty three pupils at the time of the decision. In 2007, it was reported on social media that the school had a total of seven pupils.

== Landmarks ==
St Paul's Church is a nineteenth-century church in Cwmifor. While it was originally designed as a Roman Catholic church, it became an Anglican chapel of ease once it was completed. The church is built of squared stone.

A Baptist chapel was built in 1789, enlarged in 1836 and renovated in 1864. It is built in the simple round-headed style with a long-wall entry plan.

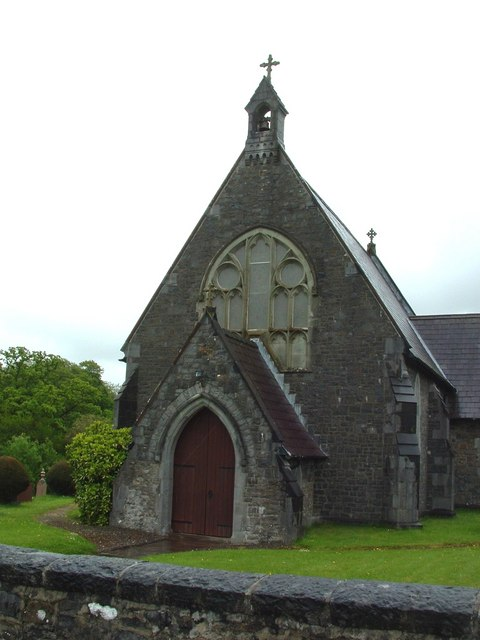
Church of St Paul, Cwmifor

The village hall, or reading room, is next door to St Paul's Church. Manordeilo and Salem Community Council meet in the village hall each month.
