= Talley transmitting station =

Television relay station in Talley, Carmarthenshire, Wales

Talley
- Mast height: 17 metres (56 ft)
- Coordinates: 51°58′52″N 3°58′55″W
- Grid reference: SN639332
- Built: 1986
- Relay of: Carmel
- BBC region: BBC Wales
- ITV region: ITV Cymru Wales

The Talley television relay station is sited on high ground to the north of the village of Talley in Carmarthenshire. It was originally built in 1986 as a fill-in relay for UHF analogue television covering the community of Talley. It consists of a 17 m wooden telegraph pole standing on a hillside which is itself about 220 m above sea level. The transmissions are beamed southwest and northwest to cover all the small settlements of the area and to provide a signal for the Llansawel repeater about 5 km to the northwest. The Talley transmission station is owned and operated by Arqiva.

Talley transmitter re-radiates the signal received off-air from Carmel about 20 km to the southwest. When it came, the digital switchover process for Talley duplicated the timing at Carmel with the first stage taking place on 26 August 2009 and with the second stage being completed on 23 September 2009. After the switchover process, analogue channels had ceased broadcasting permanently and the Freeview digital TV services were radiated at an ERP of 2 W each.

== Channels listed by frequency ==
=== Analogue television ===
==== Spring/Summer 1986 - 26 August 2009 ====
Talley entered service in late spring/early summer 1986, and (being in Wales) transmitted the S4C variant of Channel 4.

Frequency	UHF	kW	Service
615.25 MHz	39	0.0065	BBC One Wales
639.25 MHz	42	0.0065	S4C
663.25 MHz	45	0.0065	BBC Two Wales
695.25 MHz	49	0.0065	ITV1 Wales (HTV Wales until 2002)

=== Analogue and digital television ===
==== 26 August 2009 - 23 September 2009 ====
The UK's digital switchover commenced at Carmel (and therefore at Talley and all its other relays) on 26 August 2009. Analogue BBC Two Wales on channel 45 was first to close, and ITV Wales was moved from channel 49 to channel 45 for its last month of service. Channel 49 was replaced by the new digital BBC A mux which started up in 64-QAM and at full power (i.e. 2 W).

Frequency	UHF	kW	Service	System
615.25 MHz	39	0.0065	BBC One Wales	PAL System I
639.25 MHz	42	0.0065	S4C	PAL System I
663.25 MHz	45	0.0065	ITV1 Wales (HTV Wales until 2002)	PAL System I
698.000 MHz	49	0.002	BBC A	DVB-T

=== Digital television ===
==== 23 September 2009 - present ====
The remaining analogue TV services were closed down and the digital multiplexes took over on the original analogue channels' frequencies.

Frequency	UHF	kW	Operator
642.000 MHz	42	0.002	Digital 3&4
666.000 MHz	45	0.002	BBC B
698.000 MHz	49	0.002	BBC A
