= Llanfihangel-y-Pennant, Dolbenmaen =

Coordinates: 52.980°N 4.196°W

Llanfihangel-y-Pennant
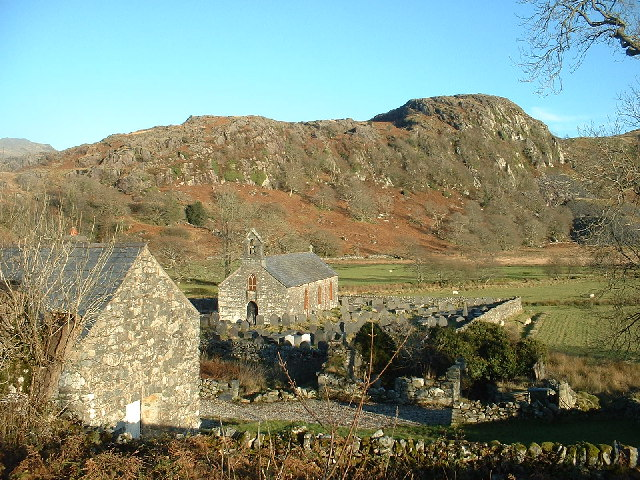
- Llanfihangel-y-Pennant

- Location within Gwynedd
- OS grid reference: SH525448
- Community: Dolbenmaen
- Principal area: Gwynedd
- Country: Wales
- Sovereign state: United Kingdom
- Post town: GARNDOLBENMAEN
- Postcode district: LL51
- Dialling code: 01766
- Police: North Wales
- Fire: North Wales
- Ambulance: Welsh
- UK Parliament: Dwyfor Meirionnydd
- Senedd Cymru – Welsh Parliament: Dwyfor Meirionnydd

See also Llanfihangel (disambiguation).

Llanfihangel-y-Pennant is a small village in Gwynedd, Wales. It is in the community of Dolbenmaen in Snowdonia.

It is named after Cwm Pennant, a valley which stretches from north of the villages of Dolbenmaen and Golan towards the Drwys y Coed pass, between Moel Hebog and Crib Nantlle.

The parish church is dedicated to Saint Michael, Llanfihangel being the Welsh for the church of St. Michael's. It is a grade II listed building. The ancient ecclesiastical parish of Llanfihangel-y-Pennant is part of the bishopric of Bangor.
