= Nantycaws =

Village in Carmarthenshire, Wales

Coordinates: 51.842872°N 4.250561°W

Nantycaws: Welsh: Nant-y-caws
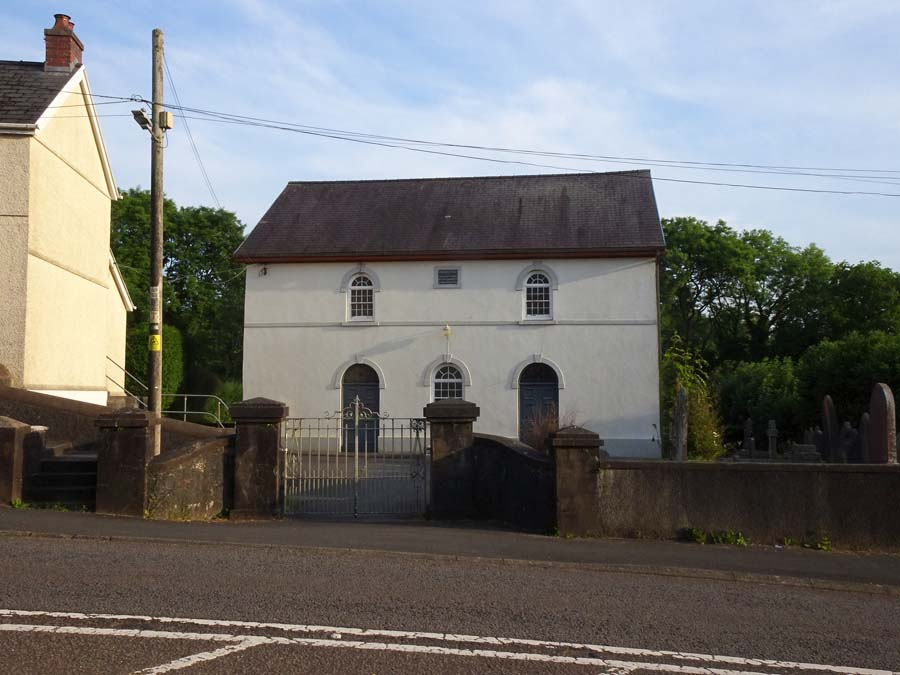
- Philadelphia Independent Chapel

- Location within Carmarthenshire
- OS grid reference: SO005025
- Community: Llangunnor
- Principal area: Carmarthenshire
- Country: Wales
- Sovereign state: United Kingdom
- Post town: CARMARTHEN
- Dialling code: 01267
- Police: Dyfed-Powys
- Fire: Mid and West Wales
- Ambulance: Welsh
- UK Parliament: Caerfyrddin

Nantycaws or Nant-y-caws is a rural settlement in the community of Llangunnor, Carmarthenshire, Wales.

'Nant y caws' is Welsh for 'River of the cheese' and probably refers to the rich dairy farmland in the area. The Welsh word for 'milk' has been used in other place names to refer to fertile land. Though plausibly 'Nant y caws' could refer to a cloudy stream, or one with an unpleasant smell.

Nantycaws lies largely on the old A48 road to Carmarthen (5 miles away) which was replaced in the 1980s with a dual carriageway, running close to the village.

There is a petrol station and restaurant on the A48 and the Nant-y-caws Recycling Centre, located to the east of the village.

The Philadelphia Independent Chapel lies on the Llangynnor Road (old A48) and dates from 1809.

== Governance ==
Nantycaws is included in the electoral ward of Llangunnor represented by one county councillor on Carmarthenshire County Council. At the most local level, it is represented by the community councillors of Llangunnor Community Council.
