= William Augustus (translator) =

18th-century Welsh weather forecaster

William Augustus, also known as Wil Awst, was a Welsh translator and weather forecaster in the late 18th century.

== Life ==
William Augustus lived at Cil-y-cwm, near Llandovery in Carmarthenshire.

== Forecasting ==
Augustus contributed translations for the Welsh portion of a 1794 book about weather lore, The Husbandman's Perpetual Prognostication, which was published by John Ross in Carmarthen in 1794. The text was published partly in Welsh and partly in English.

Augustus gained renown locally for his ability to forecast to within an hour the onset of weather events such as thunderstorms and gales. His forecasts were intended mainly for those involved in farming the land.
