= Llanycrwys =

Hamlet and community in Carmarthenshire, Wales

- Hamlet and community
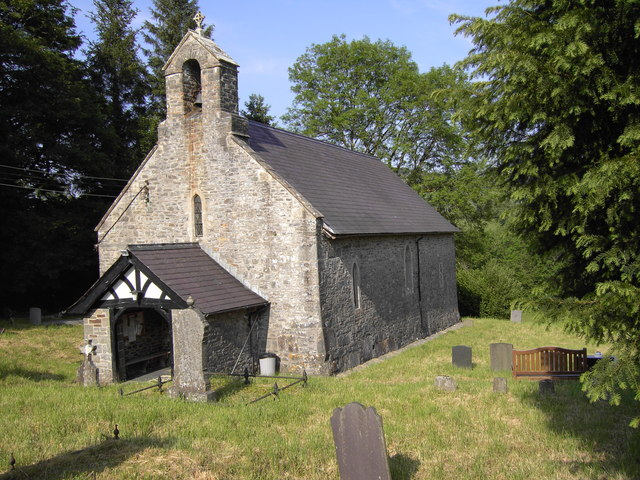

- Location within Carmarthenshire
- Community: Llanycrwys
- Principal area: Carmarthenshire
- Preserved county: Dyfed
- Country: Wales
- Sovereign state: United Kingdom
- Post town: Llanwrda
- Postcode district: SA19
- Police: Dyfed-Powys
- Fire: Mid and West Wales
- Ambulance: Welsh
- UK Parliament: Caerfyrddin
- Senedd Cymru – Welsh Parliament: Carmarthen East and Dinefwr
- List of places UK Wales Carmarthenshire 52.083°N 3.983°W Map of the community

Llanycrwys is a hamlet and community located in Carmarthenshire, Wales. Situated in the historical Cayo Hundred in the Union of Lampeter, it is situated near the River Cothi, and is separated from the parish of Caio by the Afon Twrch, which flows near the St. Davids church. The church is isolated, and was restored in 1892 by C. H. Purday of Ewan Christian, who had a porch on the western side, with a timbered gable.

In 1934, local schoolmaster Daniel Jenkins published Cerddi Ysgol Llanycrwys, a collection of Welsh language poetry written by well-known Welsh poets for the celebration of St. David's Day at Llanycrwys between 1901 and 1920.

The community is bordered by the communities of Cynwyl Gaeo and Pencarreg, both being in Carmarthenshire; and by Llanfair Clydogau in Ceredigion.

== Demographics ==
Llanycrwys' population was 235, according to the 2011 census; a 6.33% increase since the 221 people noted in 2001.

The 2011 census showed 46.7% of the population could speak Welsh, a fall from 61.4% in 2001.
