= Llansadwrn =

Village and community in Carmarthenshire, Wales

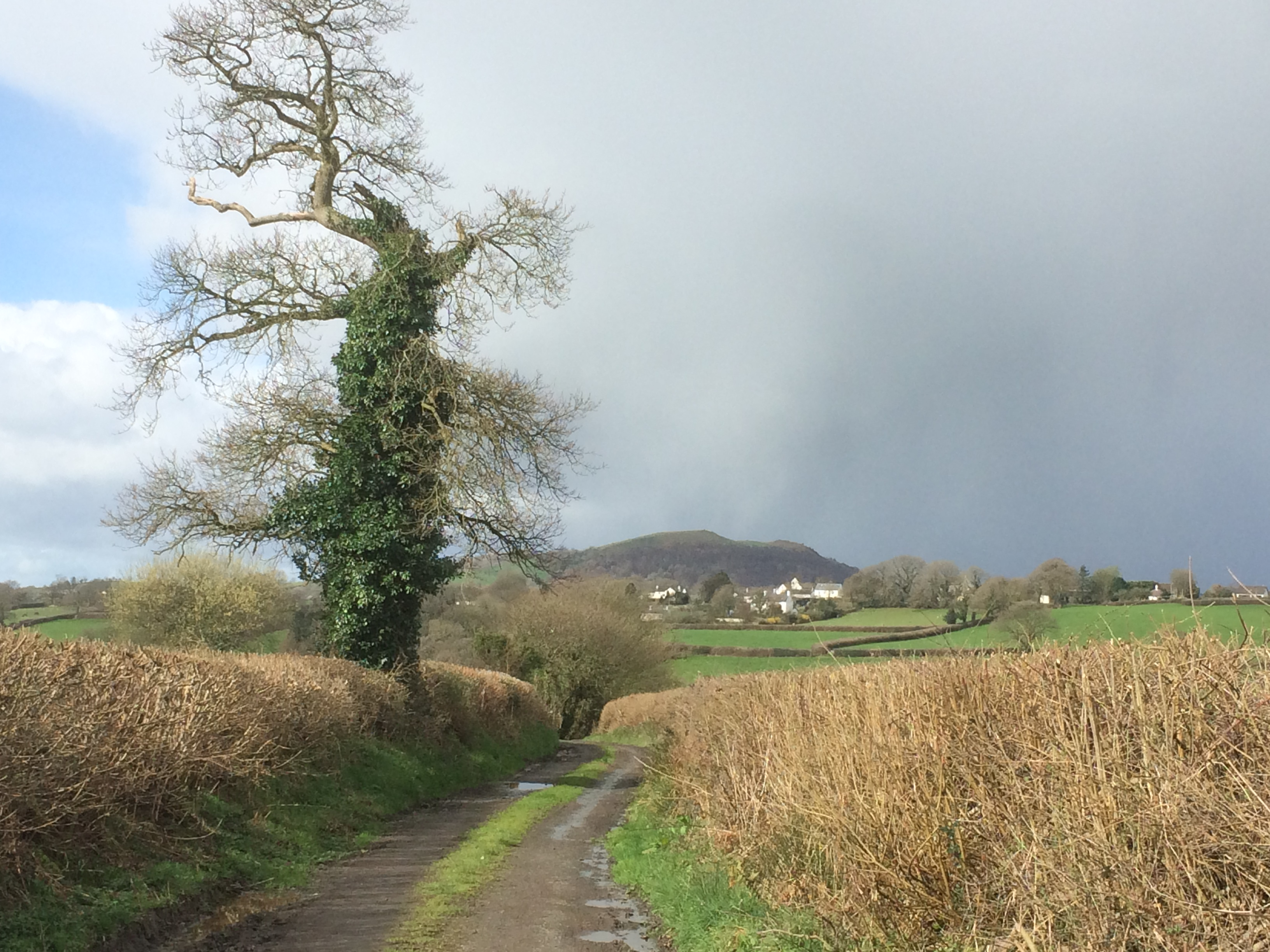

- Location within Carmarthenshire
- Population: 517 (2011)
- Community: Llansadwrn
- Principal area: Carmarthenshire
- Preserved county: Dyfed
- Country: Wales
- Sovereign state: United Kingdom
- Post town: Llanwrda
- Postcode district: SA19 8
- Dialling code: 01550
- Police: Dyfed-Powys
- Fire: Mid and West Wales
- Ambulance: Welsh
- UK Parliament: Caerfyrddin
- Senedd Cymru – Welsh Parliament: Carmarthen East and Dinefwr
- List of places UK Wales Carmarthenshire 51.95°N 3.9°W Map of the community

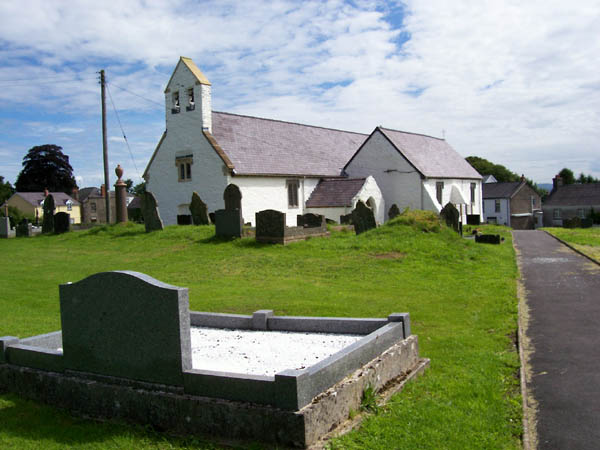
Llansadwrn Church

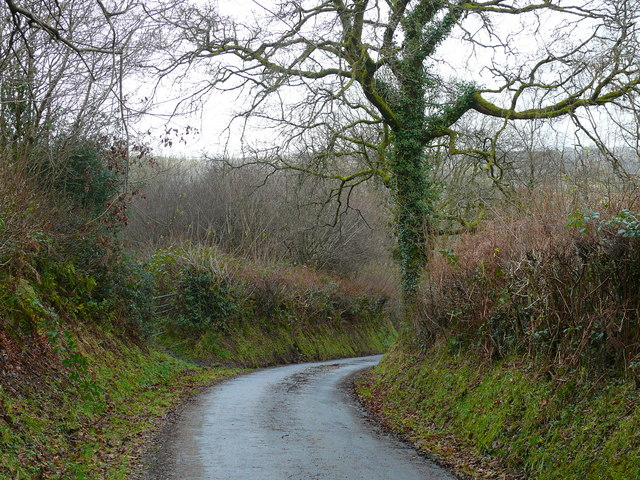
Typical local woodland

Llansadwrn is a small village and community in Carmarthenshire, Wales.

It is located in the countryside above the valley of the River Tywi, about halfway between Llandovery (Welsh: Llanymddyfri) to the north-east, and Llandeilo to the south-west. It is just off the A40 road, between Carmarthen (about 20 miles SW) and Brecon (about 25 miles E). The community is bordered by the Carmarthenshire communities of Cynwyl Gaeo, Llanwrda, Myddfai, Llangadog, Manordeilo and Salem, and Talley.

== History ==
According to tradition, it was founded by an early Christian saint, Sadwrn (fl. around 460).

Four miles to the west of the village are the ruins of Talley Abbey (Welsh: Abaty Talyllychau).

One mile to the west is the hamlet of Waunclunda, and above Waunclunda is an ancient fort. Little information is available about this fort, but it is believed to have been an Iron Age and then a Roman fort. It is believed to be important for its potential archaeology.

The village is also believed to be the site of an important manor, Abermarlais Castle a fortified mansion, built in about the C14 (Rees 1932), it was home to Sir Rhys ap Gruffydd who commanded the Welsh at Crécy (Jones 1987, 4). In the 1600s it was noted to have had 21 hearths - making it a notable house. Also in the village is a Bronze age standing stone and Roman road.

== Saint Sadwrn ==
Llansadwrn means the hermitage or monastery (llan) of saint Sadwrn. Saint Sadwrn is a Welsh saint present:

- in Wales (Wales): in Llansadwrn (Carmarthenshire)

Llansadwrn cemetery has a funerary stele with a late 6th century inscription dedicated to a certain Sarurninus [close form of Saturninus] and his holy wife.

- in North Wales (Wales): in Henllan (Denbighshire)

But it seems that the saint Sadwrn of Llansadwrn should not be confused with the saint Sadwrn of Henllan who appears in the Life of Saint Winifred.

Henllan [= Hen-llan = old church-enclosure] is located to the northwest of Denbigh. In Henllan, "The tower of Saint Sadwrn's church" is built separately from the church. In Henllan, we find "Maes Sadwrn" = the field of Sadwrn, close to "Maes-Y-Efail" (the forge field), close to "Parc-Y-Llan" (the monastery park).

- in Brittany (Brittany): in Saint-Urnel en Plomeur

The parish Saint-Urnel is related to saint Urnel or saint Saturnin, a corruption of saint Sadwrn (= sadourn = saturn(in]). The necropolis of Saint-Urnel (also known as Saint-Saturnin, by assimilation to this saint, Saint Saturnin, recognized by the Catholic Church, but whose cult is not widespread in Brittany), corresponds to a cemetery from the early Middle Ages (from the end of the Merovingian period to the Carolingian period), vast of around ten hectares, which includes tens of thousands of skeletons buried in superimposed layers (at least five layers); located on a hillock east of "Pointe de la Torche", this vast cemetery, initially excavated by Paul du Châtellier and who made the object of other excavations in the inter-war period, corresponds, according to Pierre-Roland Giot (archeologue) who excavated it between 1946 and 195044, to that of an important parish which would have existed between the 5th century and the 11th century (it was even the seat of a deanery which was abolished in 1283 and replaced by that of Beuzec-Cap-Caval), and which would have been buried under the sand due to the advance of the dunes. The ruins of a chapel built in the 11th century were discovered nearby. These tombs correspond to Bretons who recently immigrated from the island of Brittany (they have strong similarities with tombs discovered in Wales and British Cornwall). Some skeletons show trepanations.
