= Llanybydder =

Market town and community in Carmarthenshire, Wales

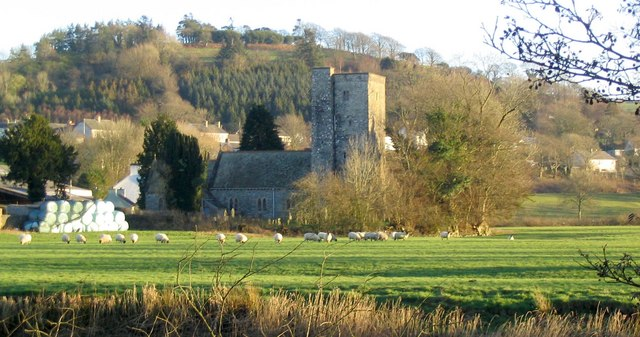
- Eglwys Sant Pedr/St Peter's Church, Llanybydder

- Location within Carmarthenshire
- Population: 1,638 (2011)
- OS grid reference: SN523438
- Community: Llanybydder
- Principal area: Carmarthenshire
- Preserved county: Dyfed
- Country: Wales
- Sovereign state: United Kingdom
- Post town: LLANYBYDDER
- Postcode district: SA40
- Dialling code: 01570
- Police: Dyfed-Powys
- Fire: Mid and West Wales
- Ambulance: Welsh
- UK Parliament: Caerfyrddin
- Senedd Cymru – Welsh Parliament: Carmarthen East and Dinefwr
- List of places UK Wales Carmarthenshire 52.07281°N 4.15645°W Map of the community

Llanybydder (Welsh pronunciation: [ˌɬanəˈbəðɛr], formerly spelt Llanybyther, is a market town and community straddling the River Teifi in Carmarthenshire, West Wales. At the 2011 Census, the population of the community was 1638, an increase from 1423 at the 2001 Census.

Llanybydder is situated around 5 miles (8 km) southwest of Lampeter where the University of Wales Trinity Saint David is located. The Mynydd Llanllwni (383m), Mynydd Llanybydder (408m) and Mynydd Pencarreg (415m) mountains are located to the south and east of Llanybydder.

== Etymology ==
The name may be a corruption of 'Llanbedr', the church dedicated to St Peter; or of 'Llanybyddair', the church of the Ambuscade. Alternately, the town's name is a combination of Welsh llan "church" + y "the" + byddair, the plural form of byddar "deaf", meaning "the church of the deaf ones". This may be in reference to a congregation whose deaf ears were opened by the call of the preacher or who remained deaf even upon hearing it.

== History ==
There is evidence of an Iron Age settlement on the hill that overlooks the town. Highmead, formerly the country mansion Dolau Mawr, built in 1777, was most recently a centre of religious studies for the Muslim faith but is unoccupied as of early 2017.

Llanybydder gained a connection to the national rail network on the Manchester and Milford Railway in 1867; this was originally part of an ill-fated scheme to link Manchester to the deepwater port at Milford Haven. However, financial pressures led the route to be diverted to Aberystwyth, and it remained a cross country route, with passenger services running until flooding severely damaged the line south of Aberystwyth in December 1964. The cost of repairs to a little-used rural line was deemed prohibitive, and although a limited service continued running from Carmarthen to Tregaron for another few months this was the era of the Beeching Axe. The line was closed to passengers in February 1965.

Llanybydder is notable for the horse fairs held there on the last Thursday of each month. These attract dealers and buyers from all parts of the UK and Ireland; the biggest are held in September and October. Of particular interest are the sales of local Welsh cobs.

== Governance ==
An electoral ward in the same name exists. This ward stretches north east to Pencarreg. The total population of the ward at the 2011 Census was 2,807.

The community is bordered by the communities of: Pencarreg; Llansawel; Llanfihangel Rhos-y-Corn; and Llanllwni, all being in Carmarthenshire; and by Llanwenog in Ceredigion.

== Economy and employment ==
=== Dunbia ===
As of October 2012, Dunbia (Dungannon Meats) was the largest business in Llanybydder, an abattoir, providing around 650 jobs. Dunbia is based in Ireland and supplies meat to several supermarket chains. The Llanybydder depot specialises in Welsh lamb; the business was formerly known as "Oriel Jones"—a family-run business owned by a local farmer. Some 350 migrant workers, mostly Poles but also Slovaks and Czechs, have been employed there, and the presence of the Polish community has been identified as having an impact on the rural community, resulting in a report on substance abuse being commissioned by the Dyfed-Powys Drug Intervention Programme.

At one time there were seven bakeries in the village, and at least ten pubs. As of 2012 only one bakery and three pubs remained. Other businesses include cafes, farmers' co-operatives, a post office, a solicitor's practice, and a hotel in the village square. The National Farmers Union also has a small office in the village.

=== Highmead Dairies ===
Highmead Dairies Ltd was a milk processing plant in Llanybydder for nearly 60 years. It processed in excess of 5 million litres a year of fresh milk and operated distribution depots in Aberystwyth and Carmarthen. It had six refrigerated lorries delivering to a total of 50 milkmen throughout West Wales together with schools, hospitals and other catering establishments.

The business was founded in 1957 by William Davies (1929–2014) of Llanybydder. Davies was from a dairy farming family and saw an opportunity to sell milk locally. Using the family farm, Llygadenwyn, as a base, he started delivering milk to local homes and eventually to other milkmen in the wider locality. The business grew over the years and in the 1960s moved to a building in the centre of Llanybydder to pasteurise the milk. In 1965 the business relocated and was expanded as turnover grew. William Davies's son, Timothy Davies subsequently took over management of the business.

In 2010, the company became part of a consortium campaigning for more milk from local suppliers to be drunk by school pupils. A new recyclable 1/3 pint bottle was designed for supplying local schools.

In 2011, the company was sold to the Tewkesbury-based Cotteswold Dairy.

== Sport ==
The town's rugby union team competes in the SWALEC Division 4 (West). Llanybydder's soccer teams play in Division 1 and (reserves) Division 2 of the Costcutter Ceredigion League.

== Notable residents ==
- Lewys Glyn Cothi (ca.1420 – 1490), one of Wales's most important medieval poets, is thought to have been born in the parish.
- Dafydd Jones (1803–1868), a Welsh balladeer a.k.a. Dewi Dywyll
- John Gwenogvryn Evans (1852–1930), a Welsh palaeographic expert and literary translator.
- Derek Thomas (theologian) (1953 - ), born and raised in the area.
