= Talley Abbey =

Ruined monastery in Carmarthenshire, Wales

Coordinates: 51.97678°N 3.99312°W

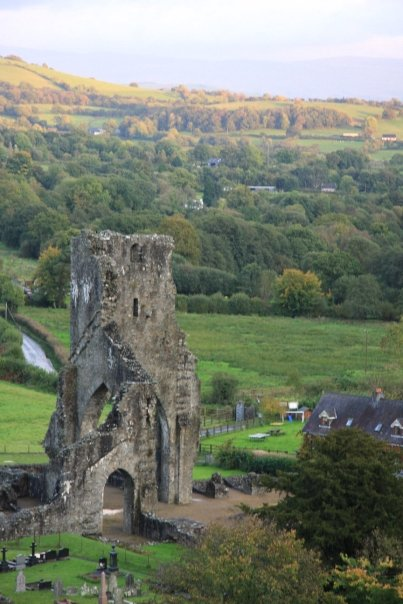
Talley Abbey from hillside.

Talley Abbey (Welsh: Abaty Talyllychau) is a ruined former monastery of the Premonstratensians ("White Canons") in the village of Talley in Carmarthenshire, Wales, six miles (10 km) north of the market town of Llandeilo. It lies in the River Cothi valley. Access to the site of the abbey is free, and the site is maintained by Cadw.

== History ==
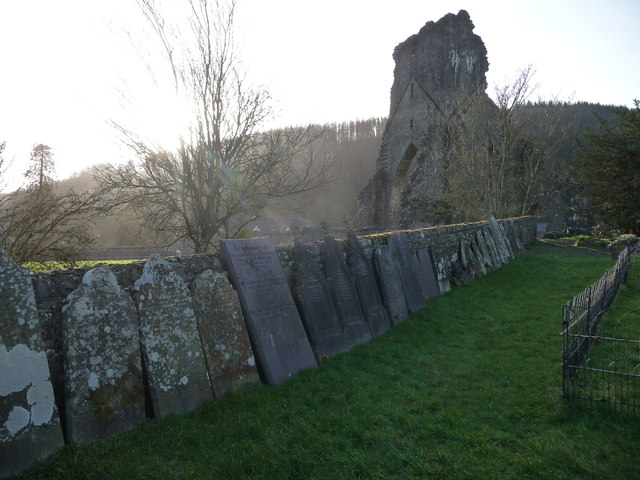
Gravestones next to Talley Abbey ruins

The Order was founded in 1120. In 1126, when it received papal approbation by Pope Honorius II, there were nine houses; others were established in quick succession throughout western Europe, so that at the middle of the fourteenth century there were some 1,300 monasteries for men and 400 for women. They came to England about 1143, first at Newhouse in Lincoln, and before the dissolution under Henry VIII there were 35 houses. Soon after their arrival in England, they founded Dryburgh Abbey in the Borders area of Scotland, which was followed by other communities at Whithorn Priory, Dercongal Abbey and Tongland Abbey all in the Borders area, as well as Fearn Abbey in Ross.

== Description ==
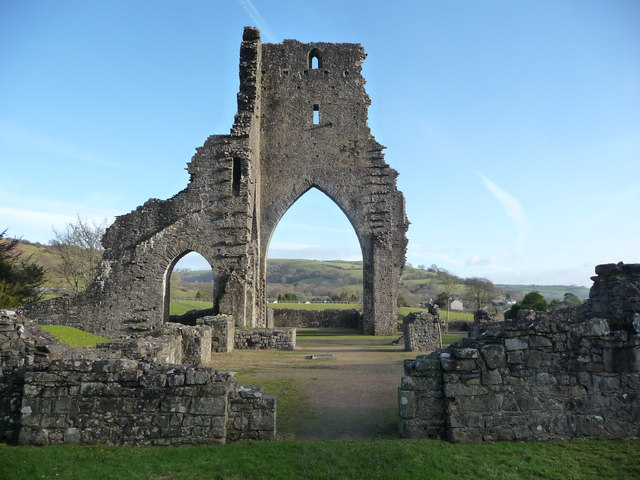
Talley Abbey ruins.

The monastery, which was founded by Rhys ap Gruffydd in or about 1185, is in the care of Cadw. In common with Strata Florida Abbey, it was once claimed to be the site of the grave of the medieval Welsh poet Dafydd ap Gwilym, but this is one of the discredited theories of Iolo Morganwg. There are two lakes near the abbey ruins, which was used for fish farming to support the community of monks. The abbey was dissolved by Henry VIII and the structure mined by the villagers for stone to build much of the present village and the chapel next to the abbey. The ruinous tower is surrounded by steep wooded hills, and it can be reached by a circuitous lane from the main road. It is well signposted.

As with many village communities, it was well populated in the Victorian period, as described by Lewis:

TALLEY, otherwise TÀL-Y-LLYCHAU, a parish, in the union of LLANDILO-VAWR, lower division of the hundred of CAYO, county of CARMARTHEN, SOUTH WALES, 7 1/2 miles (N.) from Llandilo-Vawr: containing 1068 inhabitants, of whom 418 are in the Lower, and 650 in the Upper, division. This place, of which the name, signifying "the head of the lakes," is derived from two large pools, near the church, of about fifty acres in extent, was originally of much greater importance than at present, and the seat of one of the most extensive and venerable ecclesiastical establishments in this part of the principality. The parish . . . comprises by admeasurement 7167 a. 2 r. 19 p., of which the arable proportion may consist of about two-thirds in relation to the pasture, and nearly 200 acres are woodland, and 290 a. 8 p. a common. The surface displays a continued succession of hill and dale, sideland and mountain top, and is rather woody . . . The seat, Edwinsford, stands in the north-west on the confines of the parish, of about half of which the owner of the house is the landed proprietor . . . The church, dedicated to St. Michael, having fallen into decay, was rebuilt in the Grecian style, in 1773 . . . principally from the ruins of the ancient abbey . . . There are places of worship for Baptists and Calvinistic Methodists . . . In the parish are two day schools . . . There are also three Sunday schools . . . [From A Topographical Dictionary of Wales (S. Lewis, 1844).]

== See also ==
- Dissolution of the monasteries
- Dinefwr Castle
- List of monastic houses in Wales
- Strata Florida Abbey
