= Cilycwm =

Village and community in Carmarthenshire, Wales

Coordinates: 52°02′42″N 3°49′11″W

- Village and community
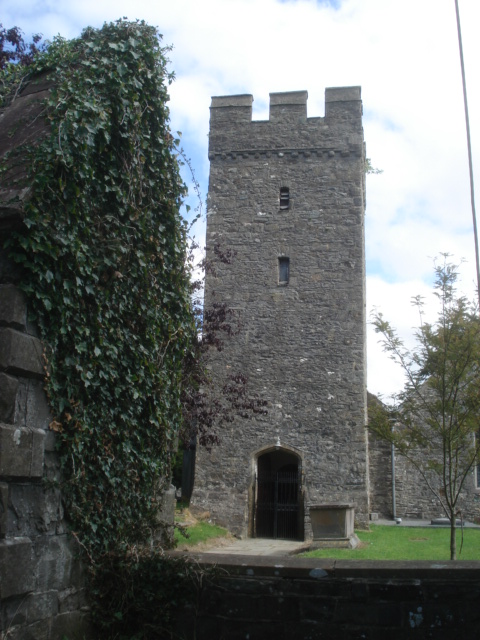
- St Michael's church

- Location within Carmarthenshire
- Principal area: Carmarthenshire
- Country: Wales
- Sovereign state: United Kingdom
- Police: Dyfed-Powys
- Fire: Mid and West Wales
- Ambulance: Welsh
- List of places UK Wales Carmarthenshire Map of the community

Cilycwm (Note: Historically Cîl-y-cwm and Kîlycwm.) (Welsh: Cil-y-cwm, IPA: [ˈkiːl ə ˈkʊm]) is a village, parish and community located in Carmarthenshire, Wales. The community population taken at the 2011 census was 487.

Cilycwm lies on the west bank of Afon Gwenlais, a tributary of the River Towy (Tywi), north of the town of Llandovery. Pont Dolauhirion, a bridge that crosses the Towy at the south of the community was designed by William Edwards and is a copy of his famous bridge at Pontypridd. The bridge is a grade I listed structure.

The parish church of St Michael's is also a grade I listed building.

The name "Cilycwm" means "the corner of the valley". The largest landowner is the Crown.

== Governance ==
An electoral ward in the same name exists. This ward stretches south to Llansadwrn. The total population of this ward taken at the 2011 census was 1518.

The community is bordered by the communities of: Llanfair-ar-y-bryn; Llandovery; Llanwrda; and Cynwyl Gaeo, all being in Carmarthenshire; and by Llanddewi Brefi in Ceredigion.

== Notable people ==
- Morgan Rhys (1716–1779), a Welsh hymn-writer.
- William Augustus, Welsh translator and weather forecaster in the late 18th century.
