= Pencarreg =

Village and community in Carmarthenshire, Wales

Coordinates: 52°05′06″N 4°08′22″W

- Village and community
- Location within Carmarthenshire
- Principal area: Carmarthenshire
- Country: Wales
- Sovereign state: United Kingdom
- Police: Dyfed-Powys
- Fire: Mid and West Wales
- Ambulance: Welsh
- List of places UK Wales Carmarthenshire Map of the community

Pencarreg (Welsh pronunciation) is a village and community located in Carmarthenshire, Wales, 4 miles (6.4 km) to the south-west of Lampeter.

Settlement is primarily grouped around the A485 road from Lampeter to Carmarthen, the primary settlement being Cwmann. The population in the United Kingdom Census 2001 was 1,120, increasing to 1,169 at the 2011 Census.

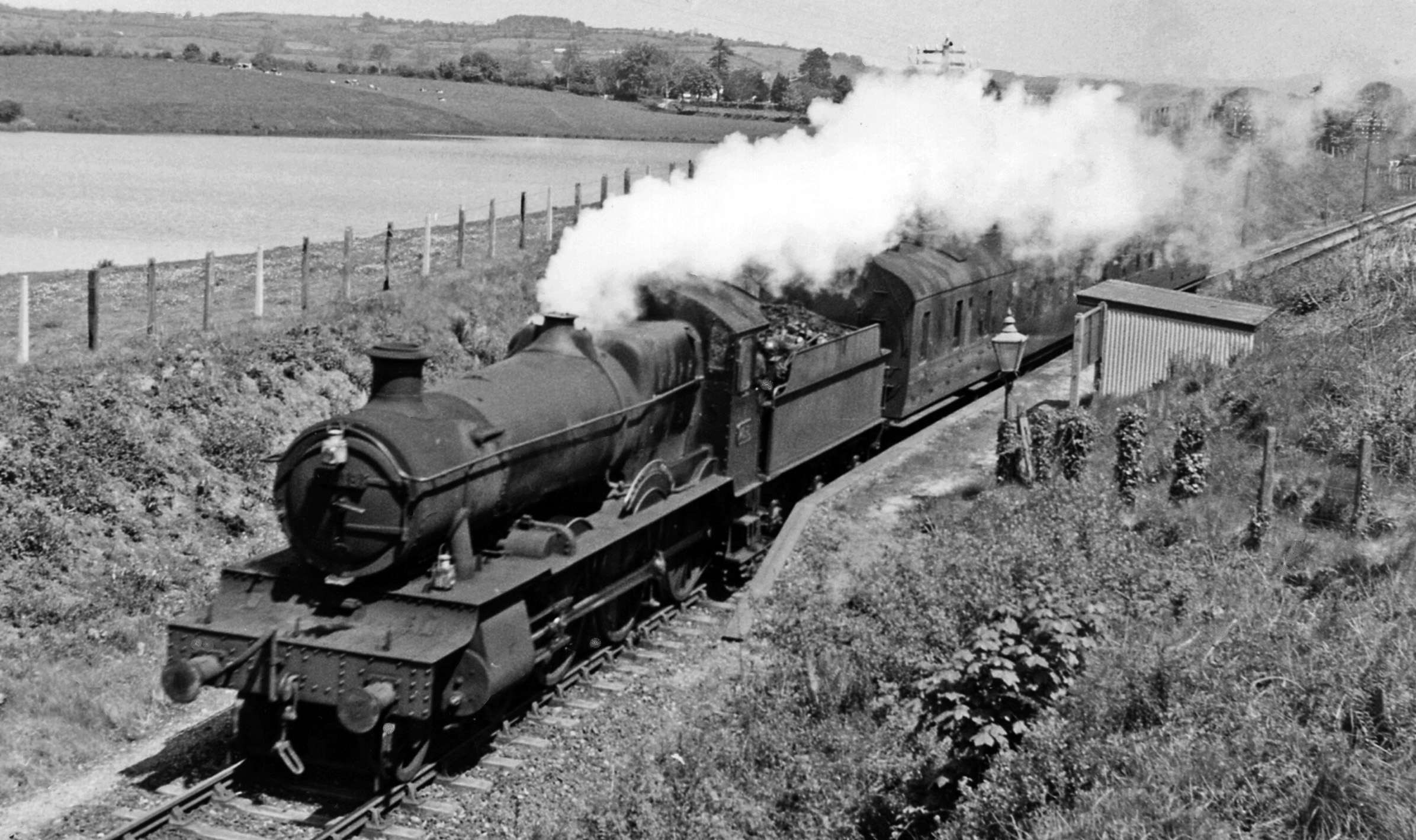
In 1930 the Great Western Railway opened Pencarreg Halt which closed in 1965

The community is bordered by the communities of: Llanycrwys; Cynwyl Gaeo; Llansawel; and Llanybydder, all being in Carmarthenshire; and by: Llanwenog; Llanwnnen; Lampeter; and Llanfair Clydogau, all being in Ceredigion.
