= Llanllwni =

Village and community in Carmarthenshire, Wales

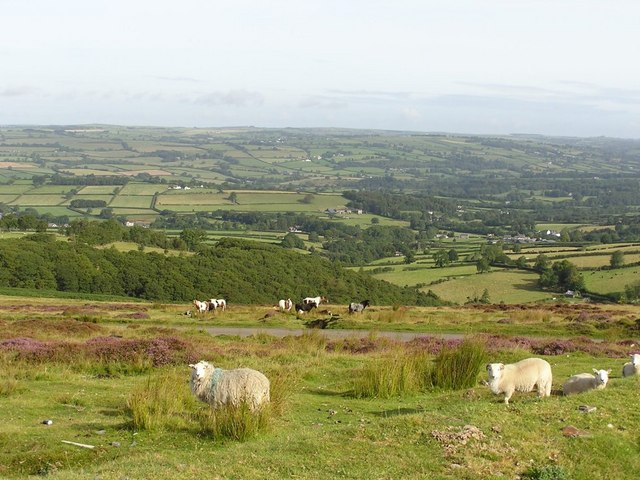
- Mynydd Llanllwni

- Location within Carmarthenshire
- Population: 638 (2011)
- OS grid reference: SN489395
- Community: Llanllwni
- Principal area: Carmarthenshire
- Preserved county: Dyfed
- Country: Wales
- Sovereign state: United Kingdom
- Post town: PENCADER
- Postcode district: SA39
- Dialling code: 01559
- Police: Dyfed-Powys
- Fire: Mid and West Wales
- Ambulance: Welsh
- UK Parliament: Caerfyrddin
- Senedd Cymru – Welsh Parliament: Carmarthen East and Dinefwr
- List of places UK Wales Carmarthenshire 52.034°N 4.203°W Map of the community

Llanllwni is a village and community in Carmarthenshire, Wales, on the A485 road south-west of Llanybydder. To the south lies the mountain, Mynydd Llanllwni. The population of 638 recorded in the 2011 Census was estimated to be 692 in 2019.

== The village ==
The village of Llanllwni lies along the A485 road, stretching for about 2.5 mi (4.0 km) along the road to the south-west of Llanybydder. Besides Llanllwni village, the community extends to the southern bank of the River Teifi and includes the summit of Mynydd Llanllwni, 1,338 ft (408 m) high. The community is bordered by the communities of: Llanybydder; Llanfihangel Rhos-y-Corn; and Llanfihangel-ar-Arth, all being in Carmarthenshire; and by Llandysul and Llanwenog in Ceredigion to the north of the River Teifi. The 2001 census recorded a population of 676, with 72.19 per cent of the community able to speak some Welsh. The population taken at the 2011 Census had decreased to 638, but was thought to have reached 692 in 2019.

The 16th-century parish church is a Grade II* listed building, formerly dedicated to St Llwni and now to St Luke. The church stands on a wooded spur in a loop of the River Teifi. The medieval work incorporates a mixture of Tudor Gothic and early 19th-century Gothic styles, with a fine early 16th-century tower.

To the north of the village are Norwood Gardens, which are open to the public for much of the year. To the south-west is the listed building and listed garden of Maesycrugiau Manor, rebuilt around 1900 after fire had destroyed much of the original Elizabethan castle. It served as a hotel and for self-catering accommodation until 2015.

== Notable people ==
In order of birth:

- David Jones (1736–1810), born in Llanllwni, was a prominent Methodist minister, who built the chapel at Llangan in 1776.
- William Saunders (1806–1851) was a Welsh-language poet and eisteddfod prizewinner born in Llanllwni.

== Wind farm ==
A plan to build a wind farm on Llanllwni Mountain with 21 wind turbines, each 127 m (417 ft) high, met resistance from residents. It was turned down by Carmarthenshire County Council in November 2012, a decision confirmed by the Welsh Government in May 2014.
