= Llangunnor =

Village and community in Carmarthenshire, Wales

Llangunnor: Welsh: Llangynnwr
- Parish church of Saint Ceinwr

- Location within Carmarthenshire
- Population: 2,381 (2011)
- OS grid reference: SN433200
- Community: Llangunnor
- Principal area: Carmarthenshire
- Preserved county: Dyfed
- Country: Wales
- Sovereign state: United Kingdom
- Post town: CARMARTHEN
- Postcode district: SA31
- Postcode district: SA32
- Dialling code: 01267
- Police: Dyfed-Powys
- Fire: Mid and West Wales
- Ambulance: Welsh
- UK Parliament: Caerfyrddin
- Senedd Cymru – Welsh Parliament: Carmarthen East and Dinefwr
- List of places UK Wales Carmarthenshire 51.85699°N 4.276085°W Map of the community

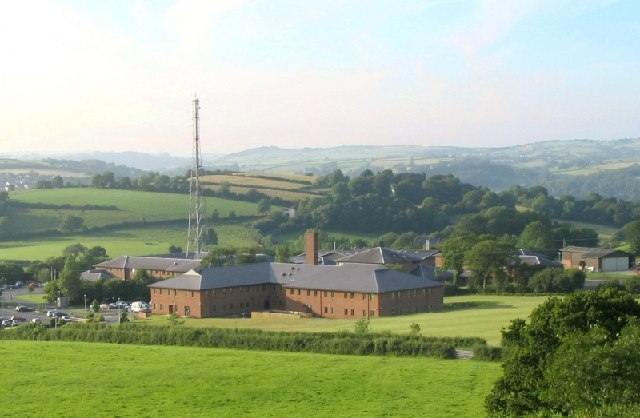
Dyfed-Powys Police Headquarters

Llangunnor (Welsh: Llangynnwr) is a village and community located in Carmarthenshire, Wales. It is the southern suburb of Carmarthen town and consists mainly of suburban housing which has expanded in recent years. It has a small shop, two chapels, a church and a primary school. It is made up of the villages and hamlets of Nantycaws, Pensarn, Login and Pibwrlwyd.

== St Ceinwr's church ==
The oldest part of the present church building dates possibly from the 14th century. David Charles the Welsh hymn-writer is buried there. A stone tablet inside the church commemorates the essayist and politician Sir Richard Steele. The church is a Grade II listed building. The vicars of St Ceinwr's can be traced back to at least 1661 and are recorded on the Incumbent board inside the church.

The parish also has two nonconformist chapels - Babell which is Methodist and Philadelphia which is Independent. Notable graves include those of poet Lewis Morris (1833 - 1907), hymn-writer David Charles and Sir Ewen Maclean.

== Manor House ==
Bryn Towy Mansion in a Grade II listed building, which was built by William Bonville Junior in approximately 1850.

== School ==
Llangunnor has a mixed primary school for day pupils aged 3 to 11 years. The present school buildings were opened in 1961 and accommodate the Junior Department, Welsh Nursery and English Infants. The Nursery and Welsh Infant Departments are accommodated in a section built in 1980. The school is sited in semi-rural surroundings south of the town of Carmarthen, close to the River Tywi.

== Governance ==
Llangunnor Community Council is made of two wards (East & West) and represented by thirteen elected members. The Council meets on the third Thursday of every month (except in August) at 'Yr Aelwyd' and meeting are open to the general public. The community is bordered by the communities of: Abergwili; Llanarthney; Llanddarog; Llangyndeyrn; Llandyfaelog; and Carmarthen, all being in Carmarthenshire. Llangunnor is also the name of the county electoral ward to Carmarthenshire County Council. The ward is coterminous with the community. The ward is represented by one county councillor.
