= Manordeilo and Salem =

Community in Carmarthenshire, Wales

Coordinates: 51.916°N 3.937°W

- Community
- Location within Carmarthenshire
- Principal area: Carmarthenshire
- Country: Wales
- Sovereign state: United Kingdom
- Police: Dyfed-Powys
- Fire: Mid and West Wales
- Ambulance: Welsh
- List of places UK Wales Carmarthenshire Map of the community

Manordeilo and Salem (Welsh: Maenordeilo a Salem) is a community located in Carmarthenshire, Wales. The population taken at the 2011 census was 1,754.

The community is bordered by the communities of: Talley; Llansadwrn; Llangadog; Dyffryn Cennen; Llandeilo; Llangathen; and Llanfynydd, all being in Carmarthenshire. Villages include Manordeilo, Salem, Halfway, Cwmifor and Capel Isaac.

== Governance ==
An electoral ward in the same name exists. This ward stretches north to Talley with a total population, again taken at the 2011 census, of 2,248.
