= Llanwrda =

Village and community in Carmarthenshire, Wales

Coordinates: 51.968°N 3.874°W

- Village and community
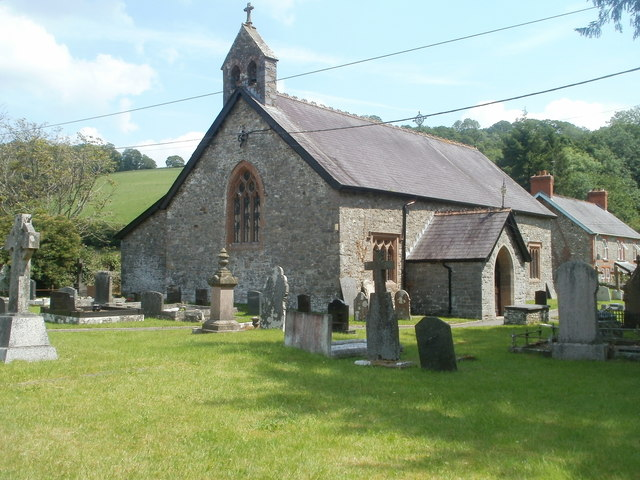
- St Cwrdaf Church in Llanwrda

- Location within Carmarthenshire
- Principal area: Carmarthenshire
- Country: Wales
- Sovereign state: United Kingdom
- Police: Dyfed-Powys
- Fire: Mid and West Wales
- Ambulance: Welsh
- List of places UK Wales Carmarthenshire Map of the community

Llanwrda ([ɬan'ʊrda]) is a village and community in Carmarthenshire, Wales, 4 miles (6.4 km) southwest of Llandovery. It lies on the River Towy. The population in 2011 was 514.

== Transport and other features ==
The village is served by Llanwrda railway station.

The south end of the community is intersected by the A40 road between Llandeilo and Llandovery and the village stands at the junction of this road with the A482 to Lampeter and Aberaeron. The community is bordered by the Carmarthenshire communities of: Cynwyl Gaeo; Cilycwm; Llandovery; Myddfai; and Llansadwrn.

6 miles from the village centre are the Dolaucothi Gold Mines.

== Notable people ==
- Sir John Powell (ca.1632 – 1696), a Welsh judge on the Court of Common Pleas and the Court of King's Bench.
- Thomas Johns (1836–1914), a Welsh Independent (Congregationalist) minister

and

It has been claimed that the church is the last resting-place of Owain Glyndŵr, the last native Welshman to hold the title of Prince of Wales.
