= Llanddarog =

Community in Carmarthenshire, Wales

Coordinates: 51.828°N 4.174°W

- Community
- Location within Carmarthenshire
- Principal area: Carmarthenshire
- Country: Wales
- Sovereign state: United Kingdom
- Police: Dyfed-Powys
- Fire: Mid and West Wales
- Ambulance: Welsh
- List of places UK Wales Carmarthenshire Map of the community

Llanddarog (Welsh pronunciation) is a community located in Carmarthenshire, Wales.The community population at the 2011 census was 1,198., and includes the villages of Cwmisfael, Mynyddcerrig and Porthyrhyd.

The community is bordered by the communities of: Llanarthney; Gorslas; Pontyberem; Llangyndeyrn; and Llangunnor, all being in Carmarthenshire.

== Governance ==
An electoral ward of the same name exists. This ward stretches beyond the confines of Llanddarog with a total population of 1,963.
