= Talley =

Village and community in Carmarthenshire, Wales

Coordinates: 51.976°N 3.991°W

- Village and community
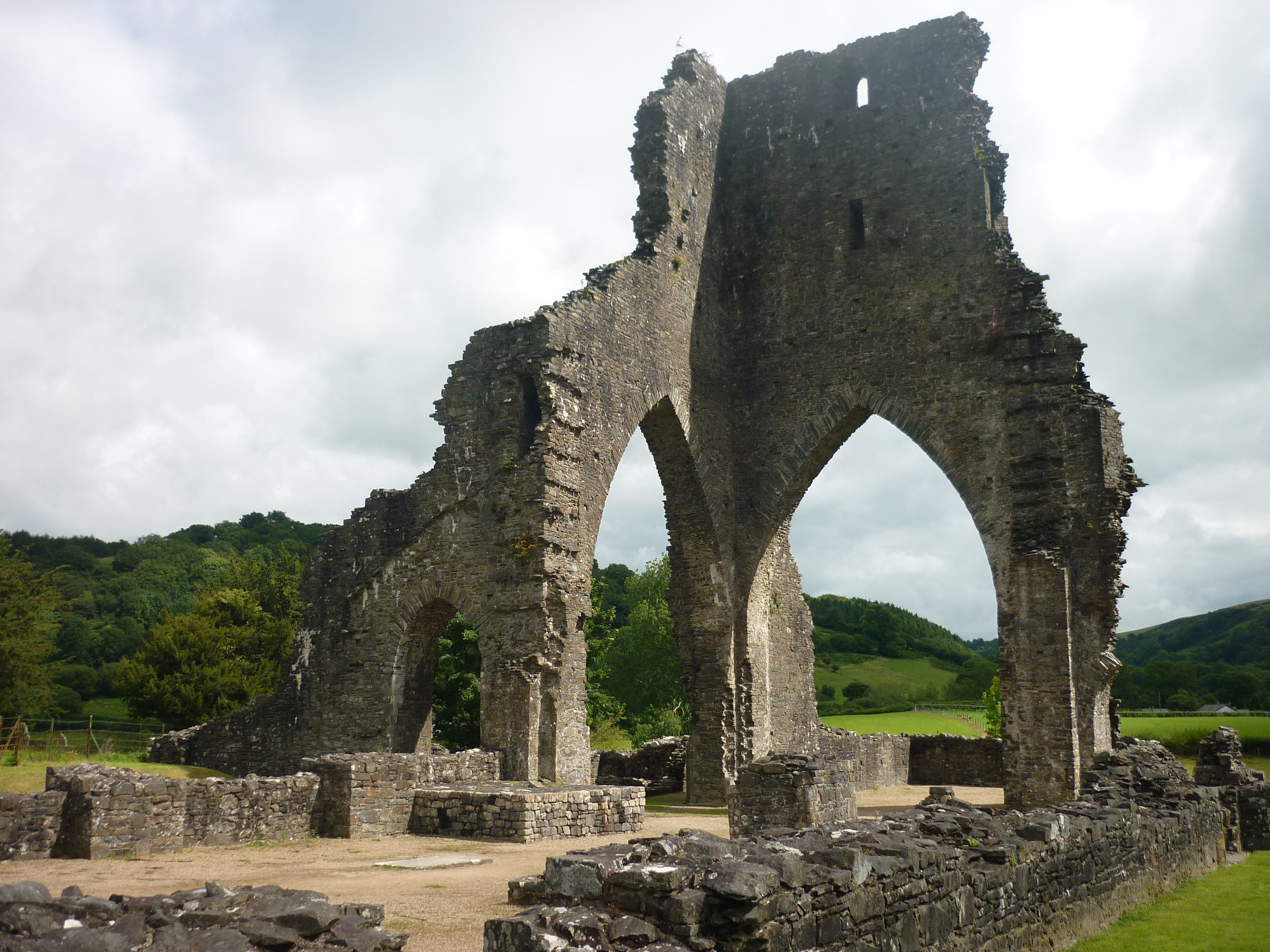
- Talley Abbey

- Location within Carmarthenshire
- Principal area: Carmarthenshire
- Country: Wales
- Sovereign state: United Kingdom
- Police: Dyfed-Powys
- Fire: Mid and West Wales
- Ambulance: Welsh
- List of places UK Wales Carmarthenshire Map of the community

Talley (Welsh: Talyllychau, historically Tal y Llychau) is a village and community in Carmarthenshire, Wales. The population taken at the 2011 census was 494.

The community is bordered by the communities of: Llansawel; Cynwyl Gaeo; Llansadwrn; Manordeilo and Salem; and Llanfynydd, all being in Carmarthenshire.

It is the site of the ruined Talley Abbey, a former Premonstratensian foundation destroyed in about 1536 during the Dissolution of the Monasteries.

== Notable people ==
- Emanuel Bowen (1694–1767), map engraver
- Swampy (born 1973), environmental campaigner

== See also ==
- Talley Abbey
- Talley Lakes, an SSSI
- Talley transmitting station
