= Llangyndeyrn =

Village and community in Carmarthenshire, Wales

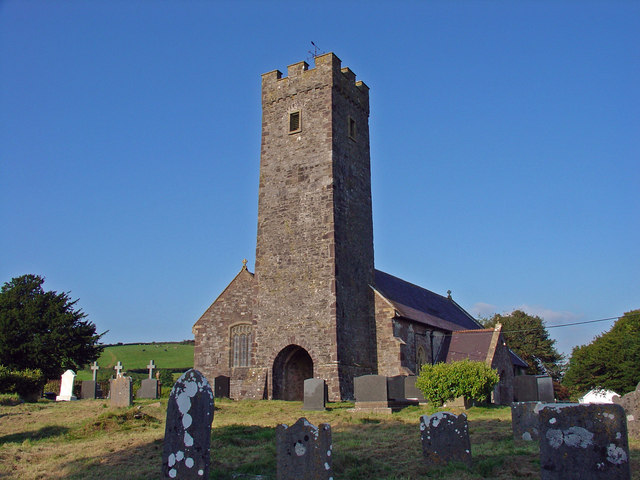
- St. Cyndeyrnin the parish church

- Location within Carmarthenshire
- Population: 3,102
- OS grid reference: SN457140
- Community: Llangyndeyrn
- Principal area: Carmarthenshire
- Preserved county: Dyfed
- Country: Wales
- Sovereign state: United Kingdom
- Post town: LLANELLI
- Postcode district: SA15
- Post town: KIDWELLY
- Postcode district: SA17
- Dialling code: 01269
- Police: Dyfed-Powys
- Fire: Mid and West Wales
- Ambulance: Welsh
- UK Parliament: Llanelli
- Senedd Cymru – Welsh Parliament: Carmarthen East and Dinefwr
- List of places UK Wales Carmarthenshire 51.8033°N 4.2393°W Map of the community

Llangyndeyrn (Welsh pronunciation) is a village, community and electoral ward in the River Gwendraeth valley, Carmarthenshire, in Dyfed region of West Wales, United Kingdom. The village name is often spelt as Llangendeirne. In 2011 the community had a population of 3102.

The Welsh language name of the village means "the church of St. Cyndeyrn". A Welsh saint named Cyndeyrn is the equivalent of the English Kentigern and the Scottish St. Mungo; but the St Cyndeyrn associated with Llangyndeyrn is believed to be a different one, a descendant of Cunedda whose festival is on 5/6 August.

Both St Cyndeyrn's parish church and Capel Salem are grade II* listed buildings. Nearby is the remains of Banc y Betws, or Betws Castle, a motte-and-bailey castle.

The small village is well known for its resistance against the attempt to flood the village in order to create a reservoir for the Borough of Swansea.

Within the village is the Ysgol Y Fro school for infants.

The community is bordered by the communities of: Llangunnor; Llanddarog; Pontyberem; Llanelli Rural; Trimsaran; Kidwelly; and Llandyfaelog, all being in Carmarthenshire and includes the villages of Pontyates, Carway and Meinciau.

== Governance ==
Llangyndeyrn is also a county electoral ward to Carmarthenshire County Council. The ward is coterminous with the community. The ward is represented by one county councillor.
