= Cynwyl Gaeo =

Community in Carmarthenshire, Wales

Coordinates: 52°03′18″N 3°57′25″W

- Community
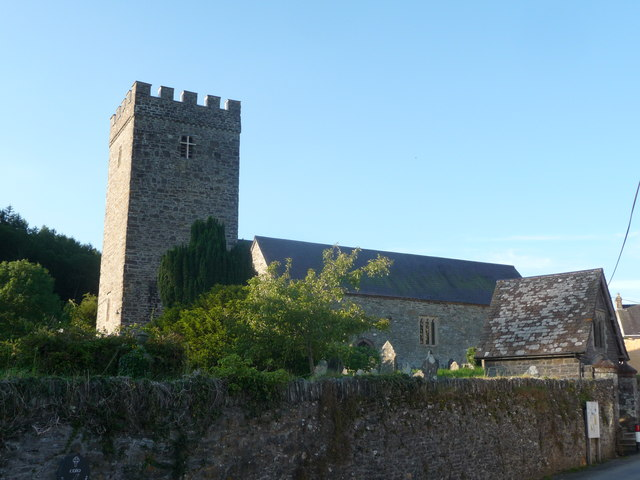
- St Cynwyl's parish church

- Location within Carmarthenshire
- Principal area: Carmarthenshire
- Country: Wales
- Sovereign state: United Kingdom
- Police: Dyfed-Powys
- Fire: Mid and West Wales
- Ambulance: Welsh
- List of places UK Wales Carmarthenshire Map of the community

Cynwyl Gaeo is a parish and community located in rural Carmarthenshire, Wales, near the boundary with Ceredigion, in the upper Cothi valley about halfway between Lampeter and Llandovery. The population of the community at the United Kingdom Census 2011 was 940. It includes the villages of Caio (Caeo), Crug-y-bar, Cwrtycadno, Ffarmers and Pumsaint.

Historically it was part of the commote of Caeo, which in turn was part of Y Cantref Mawr ("The Great Hundred"), a division of Ystrad Tywi.

It is the location of the Dolaucothi Gold Mines, part of Dolaucothi Estate, whose owner, John Johnes, was murdered by his butler in 1876. The mansion house was demolished in 1952.

The parish church of St Cynwyl in the village of Caeo is a Grade II* listed building.

== Governance ==
An electoral ward in the same name exists. This ward stretches south to Llansawel. The total population of the ward at the 2011 Census was 1,613.

The community is bordered by the communities of: Cilycwm; Llanwrda; Llansadwrn; Talley; Llansawel; Pencarreg; and Llanycrwys, all being in Carmarthenshire; and by Llanfair Clydogau and Llanddewi Brefi in Ceredigion.
