= Llanfihangel Rhos-y-Corn =

Community in Carmarthenshire, Wales

Coordinates: 51.983°N 4.117°W

- Community
- Location within Carmarthenshire
- Principal area: Carmarthenshire
- Country: Wales
- Sovereign state: United Kingdom
- Police: Dyfed-Powys
- Fire: Mid and West Wales
- Ambulance: Welsh
- List of places UK Wales Carmarthenshire Map of the community

Llanfihangel Rhos-y-Corn is a sparsely populated community of Carmarthenshire, Wales. The population of the community taken at the 2011 census was 468.

The community is bordered by the communities of: Llanybydder; Llansawel; Llanfynydd; Llanegwad; Llanllawddog; Llanfihangel-ar-Arth; and Llanllwni, all being in Carmarthenshire. It includes the village of Brechfa.

The parish contains the church of St. Michael, a Grade II listed building containing architectural elements from the 14th-15th centuries. A Welsh Independent Chapel is situated in the hamlet of Gwernogle, first built in 1749. The fact that Gwernogle might have been the site of a medieval chapel-of-ease is attested to by the placename "Capel St Silin", which was the home of Thomas Glyn Cothi. There is also a Welsh Independent Chapel at Llidiad Nenog, and a Welsh Unitarian chapel, built in 1832, was situated just south of Gwernogle at Cwm-mawr-du.

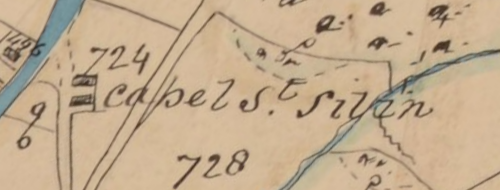
Capel St Silin as shown on the 1840s tithe map
