= Llanfynydd =

Village and community in Carmarthenshire, Wales

Coordinates: 51.928°N 4.098°W

- Village and community
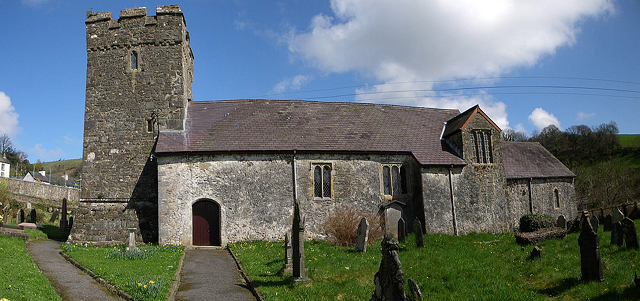
- Llanfynydd Parish Church in 2006

- Location within Carmarthenshire
- Principal area: Carmarthenshire
- Country: Wales
- Sovereign state: United Kingdom
- Police: Dyfed-Powys
- Fire: Mid and West Wales
- Ambulance: Welsh
- List of places UK Wales Carmarthenshire Map of the community

Llanfynydd is a village, parish and community in Carmarthenshire, Wales. The community population at the 2021 census was 528. It lies some 10 miles (16 km) north-east of the county town, Carmarthen. Bordering it are the communities of Llansawel, Talley, Manordeilo and Salem, Llangathen, Llanegwad and Llanfihangel Rhos-y-Corn, all in Carmarthenshire.

== Heritage ==
The Church in Wales parish church is a Grade II* listed building dedicated to St Egwad, a 7th-century bishop in Wales. The tower, probably the earliest part, dates from about 1400. The north aisle was added in the 16th century. The building was restored in 1861, when further windows were added. The only indication of a previous church further up the valley is in the name of a farm: Bryn-Yr-Eglwys ("Hill of the Church").

In 1844 Llanfynydd was a parish of 11,000 acres and 1,358 inhabitants in Cathinog Hundred. By 1929 the population was down to 581.

=== Worship ===
Parish registers exist from 1692. The parish also has several chapels. Spite Chapel is one of the oldest Methodist causes in this part of Carmarthenshire. The current chapel building dates from 1838, and the cause’s origins go back to 1738. According to D. Simon Evans’s history of the chapel, the chapel was built in a field known as Cae’r Spite, part of Ffynnondysul farm.

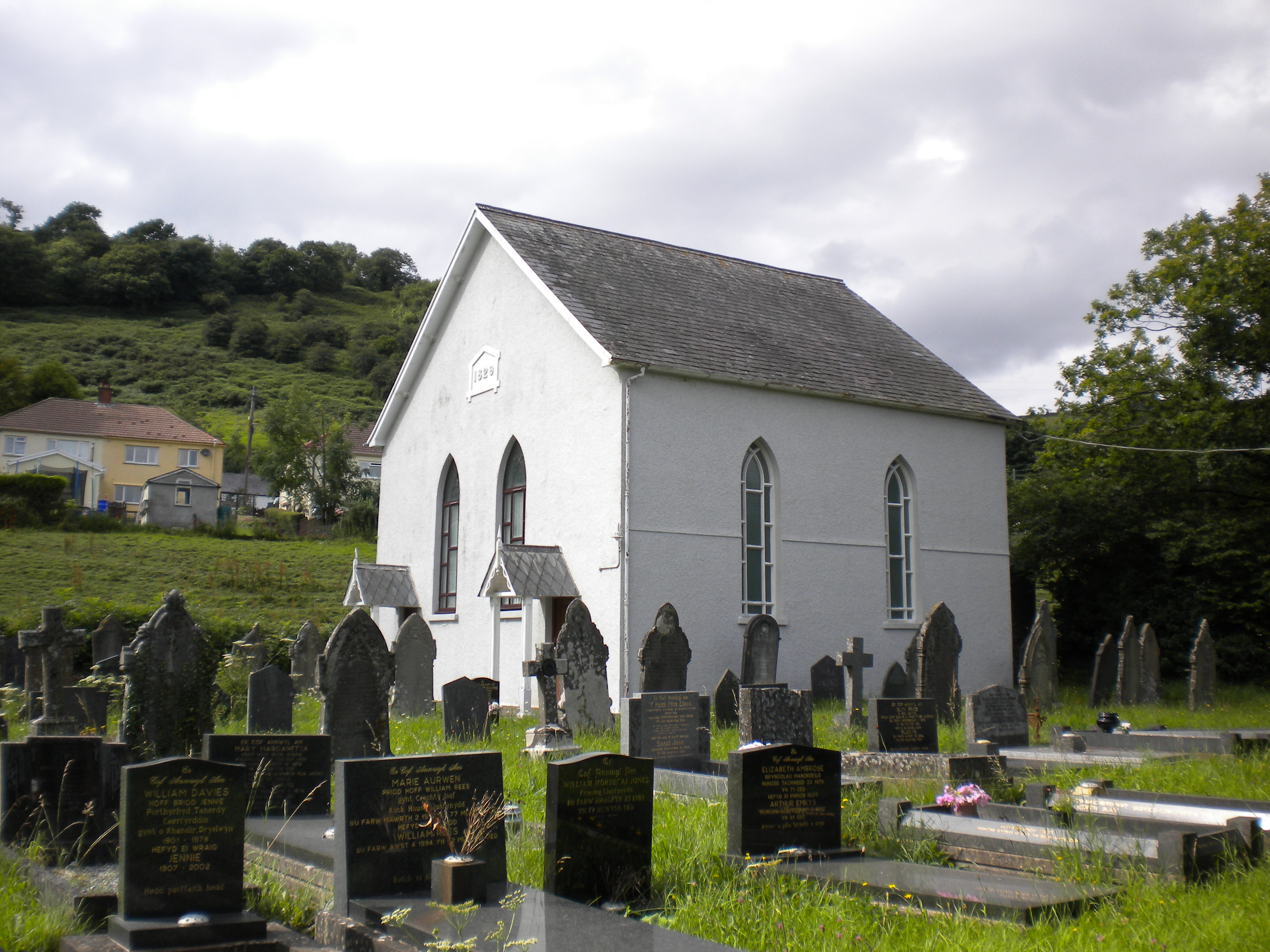
Amor Baptist Chapel

Amor baptist chapel was founded in 1829. According to a local story, the builder of the chapel was owed £100 and it took 10 years for this sum to be paid, the chapel having to remain unopened in that time. Amor chapel was used as a replacement for the local primary school when the latter was affected by a fire in 1954.

Carmel Calvinistic Methodist Chapel stood near Cefnbrisgen and was built in 1850–51. Records pertaining to the chapel include baptismal registers, 1867–1945; a church register recording members and their financial contributions, 1881–1928; and associated congregational records stretching into the middle of the twentieth century. Pen-y-Garn Independent Sunday School in the north of the parish, built in 1869, was a Sunday school or preaching station linked with the Independent church at Abergorlech, which is known as Capel Newydd. The nineteenth-century history mentions the Calvinistic Methodists and Baptists of the area were linked with Pen-y-Garn, which shows that the Schoolroom might have been used by a variety of denominations.

=== Education ===
D. Jones, a local clergyman, established a day school in Llanfynydd in 1738, for 20 children.

The number of pupils at the school had fallen to 11 by September 2013, with a deficit of £50,000, and Carmarthenshire County Council warned that the school would close if numbers fell below 10.

However, in December 2014 the BBC reported that though the school had no pupils, it could not be closed until the county council had held a consultation and a vote on the issue.

== Public protest ==
In July 2004, in protest over plans to erect a wind farm nearby, the residents of Llanfynydd renamed their village Llanhyfryddawelllehynafolybarcudprindanfygythiadtrienusyrhafnauole ("lovely silent church, ancient place of the rare kite under wretched threat from misplaced blades") for the space of one week.

The name was chosen to reflect villagers' concern that the wind farm would threaten three endangered species of bird (the red kite, the curlew, and the skylark) and to generate publicity for their cause by being longer than the previously longest place name in the UK: that of Llanfairpwllgwyngyllgogerychwyrndrobwllllantysiliogogogoch in Anglesey.

The protest went ahead despite assurances from the local council and from the Spanish-owned developers Gamesa Energy UK (part of Gamesa Corporación Tecnológica) that the single wind turbine planned was intended merely as a test to see how suitable the area might be for wind turbines in the future.

== Subdivisions ==
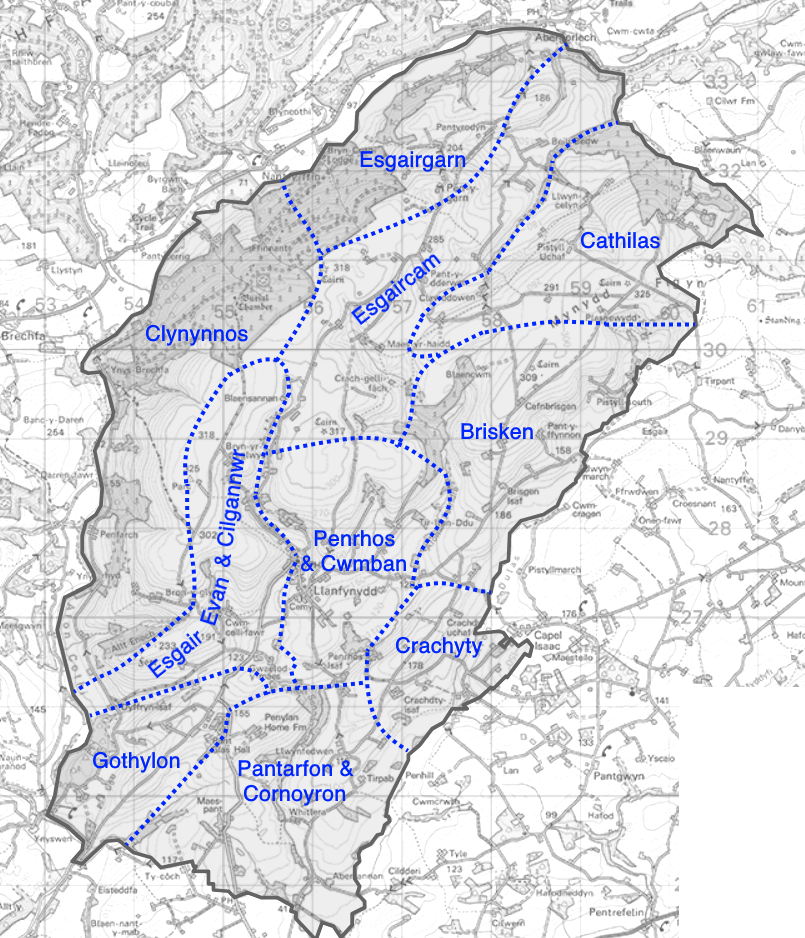
The Approximate Locations of the Llanfynydd Townships

According to the 1841 Census, Llanfynydd Parish comprised the following Hamlets and Townships:

- Brisgen
- Cathilas
- Clynynnos
- Crachyty
- Esgair Evan & Cilgannwr
- Esgaircam
- Esgairgarn
- Gothylon
- Pantarfon & Cornoyron
- Penrhos & Cwmban

== Notable people ==
- John Dyer (1699–1757), a painter and Welsh poet who became a priest in the Church of England
- Thomas Rees (1815–1885), Congregational minister and historian of nonconformity, was born at Pen Pontbren, Llanfynydd; twice elected to chair the Union of Welsh Independents.
