= Llansawel =

Village and community in Carmarthenshire, Wales

Coordinates: 52.008°N 4.012°W

- Village and community
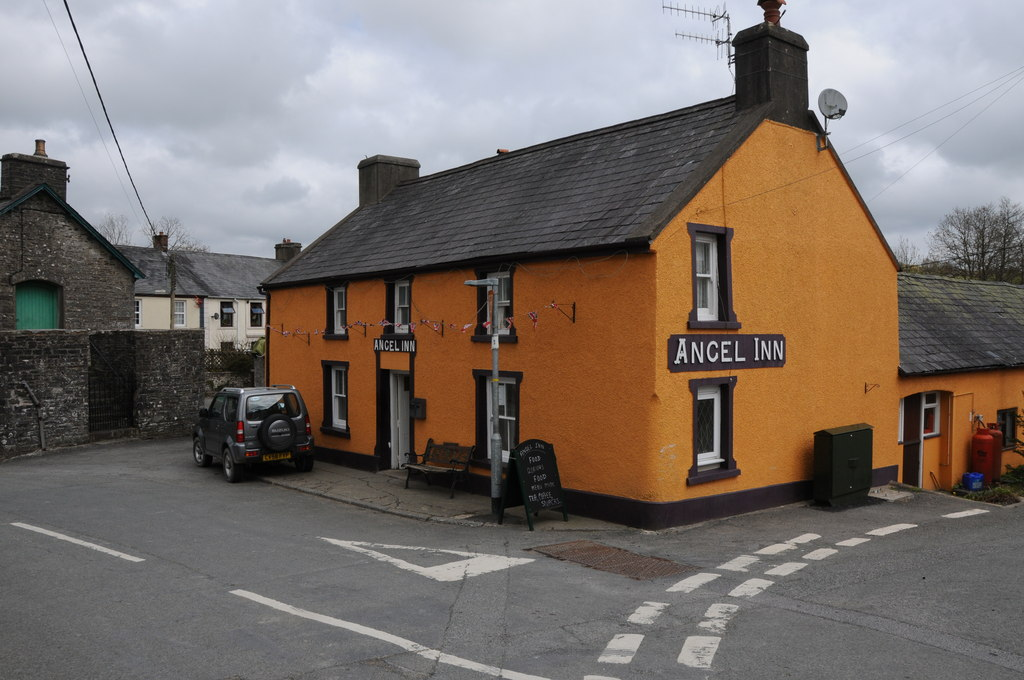
- Angel Inn, in the village

- Location within Carmarthenshire
- Principal area: Carmarthenshire
- Country: Wales
- Sovereign state: United Kingdom
- Police: Dyfed-Powys
- Fire: Mid and West Wales
- Ambulance: Welsh
- List of places UK Wales Carmarthenshire Map of the community

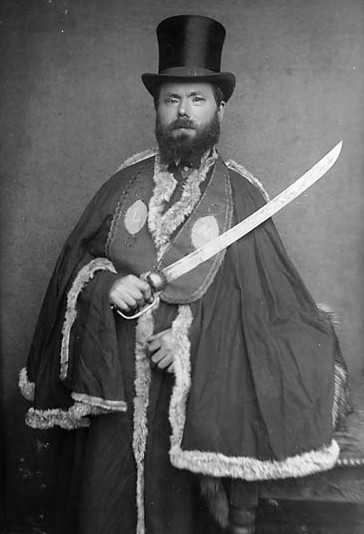
Mr Jones, Lord Mayor of Llansawel, ca 1885

Llansawel is a village and community in Carmarthenshire, Wales, about ten miles north of Llandeilo. It covers an area of 4,079 hectares (15.75 sq mi). The community is bordered by the communities of: Pencarreg; Cynwyl Gaeo; Talley; Llanfynydd; Llanfihangel Rhos-y-Corn; and Llanybydder, all being in Carmarthenshire.

Llansawel's population was 438, according to the 2011 census; a 6.1% increase since the 413 people noted in 2001.

The 2011 census showed 47.9% of the population could speak Welsh, a fall from 60.8% in 2001.

== Notable people ==
- John Williams (died 1613), Principal of Jesus College, Oxford, from 1602 to 1613 and also Dean of Bangor.
- Griffith Powell (1561–1620), a philosopher and Principal of Jesus College, Oxford, from 1613 to 1620.
- DJ Williams (1885–1970), Welsh-language writer and Plaid Cymru co-founder
