= Llanfihangel-ar-Arth =

Village and community in Carmarthenshire, Wales

Coordinates: 52.035770°N 4.252389°W

- Village and community
- Location within Carmarthenshire
- Principal area: Carmarthenshire
- Country: Wales
- Sovereign state: United Kingdom
- Police: Dyfed-Powys
- Fire: Mid and West Wales
- Ambulance: Welsh
- List of places UK Wales Carmarthenshire Map of the community

Llanfihangel-ar-Arth is a village and community in the county of Carmarthenshire, Wales.

The area includes six villages: Alltwalis, Dolgran, Gwyddgrug, Llanfihangel-Ar-Arth, New Inn and Pencader. The population of the community taken at the 2011 census was 2,213.

== Location ==
The village is located around the B4336 between Llanllwni and Llandysul from the east to west, and the B4459 between Capel Dewi and Pencader from the north to south.

== Etymology ==
Llanfihangel-ar-Arth is the most northerly village in the community, nearest the river Teifi. It is believed that the village's name derives from the name of the parish church, Sant Mihangel, which was established in the 6th century.

== Governance ==
An electoral ward of the same name exists, stretching beyond the community. The total population of the ward at the 2011 census was 2,851.

The community is bordered by the communities of Llanllwni, Llanfihangel Rhos-y-Corn, Llanllawddog, Llanpumsaint, Cynwyl Elfed and Llangeler, all in Carmarthenshire, and by Llandysul in Ceredigion.

== History ==
Between 1840 and 1850, there was a tollhouse in the village to collect tolls from travellers. In June 1843, one of the Rebecca Riots occurred here and the gate was destroyed by 150 people. It was a one-level building and is now a residential bungalow.

The railway from Carmarthen and Lampeter travelled through Llanfihangel-ar-Arth, which later had its own station. The station closed in the 1960s and only part of the track remains. From the 1840s to 1920s, many of the village houses were used as woollen workshops when the wool industry was important in the area.

As well as the church, the village has two pubs and a school that opened in 1864 but was closed in 2003. The school now acts as a community centre or village hall. There are various small businesses and agriculture also supplies employment in the area.

The village has an annual carnival.
