= Grade II* listed buildings in Carmarthenshire =

Carmarthenshire shown within Wales

In the United Kingdom, the term listed building refers to a building or other structure officially designated as being of special architectural, historical, or cultural significance; Grade II* structures are those considered to be "particularly important buildings of more than special interest". Listing was begun by a provision in the Town and Country Planning Act 1947. Once listed, strict limitations are imposed on the modifications allowed to a building's structure or fittings. In Wales, the authority for listing under the Planning (Listed Buildings and Conservation Areas) Act 1990 rests with Cadw.

== Buildings ==
Name	Location Grid Ref. (Note: Sometimes known as OSGB36, the grid reference is based on the British national grid reference system used by the Ordnance Survey.) Geo-coordinates	Date Listed	Function	Notes	Reference Number	Image
Cenarth Bridge	Cenarth; SN2691641580; 52°02′44″N 4°31′31″W	23 June 1967	Bridge	Crosses Afon Teifi between Cardigan and Newcastle Emlyn. Also in Ceredigion.	9374	See more images
St Luke's Church, Llanllwni	Llanllwni; SN4734441299; 52°02′56″N 4°13′39″W	23 June 1967	Church	In an isolated position away from Llanllwni village and on an elevated site directly above Afon Teifi.	9378	See more images
Pont Cothi	Abergorlech; SN5847333584; 51°58′58″N 4°03′44″W	7 August 1966	Bridge	Spanning the Afon Cothi in the centre of the village and carrying a minor road immediately S of its junction with the B4310. Additional reference numbers: Coflein 23996	9380	Pont Cothi
Paxton's Tower	Llanarthney; SN5409719147; 51°51′06″N 4°07′11″W	12 March 1951	Tower	On the summit of a high hill 1km SE of Llanarthney village, making an impressive and conspicuous landmark for miles around.	9384	See more images
Plas Llanstephan	Llansteffan; SN3492110466; 51°46′06″N 4°23′38″W	12 March 1951	Country house	At the end of a private access road leading S from Llansteffan village.	9385	See more images
Cwmgwili	Bronwydd; SN4234823255; 51°53′08″N 4°17′32″W	30 November 1966	House	Set in its own grounds approximately 2.5km NW of Abergwili. Additional reference numbers: Coflein 17269	9387	Upload Photo
St Cynwyl's Church, Cynwyl Elfed	Cynwyl Elfed; SN3737227507; 51°55′20″N 4°21′59″W	30 November 1966	Church	Near the centre of Cynwyl Elfed village NE of Pont Cynwyl just off the A484.	9388	See more images
St David's Church, Llanarthney (also known as Church of St Arthneu or St Arthney).	Llanarthney; SN5344220262; 51°51′42″N 4°07′47″W	30 November 1966	Church	In centre of the village of Llanarthney. Stone-walled graveyard with lychgate [separately listed]. Graveyard extended to W. Numerous tombstones of a locally favoured tapering obelisk type; several enclosures with cast-iron railings.	9390	See more images
Pont Llandeilo-yr-ynys	Llanarthney; SN4931820280; 51°51′39″N 4°11′23″W	30 November 1966	Bridge	Across River Towy 8km east of Carmarthen. Also in Llanegwad.	9391	Pont Llandeilo-yr-ynys
Capel Bigawdin	Llanddarog; SN5115314712; 51°48′40″N 4°09′38″W	30 November 1966	Chapel	Attached to a field wall S of Wern-las Farm, approximately 2km SE of Llanddarog village.	9395	Upload Photo
St Cyndeyrn's Church	Llangyndeyrn; SN4562113985; 51°48′11″N 4°14′26″W	30 November 1966	Church	In a round churchyard in the centre of the village.	9399	See more images
St Cynin's Church	Llangynin; SN2539618043; 51°50′01″N 4°32′08″W	30 November 1966	Church	In an isolated position on a minor road 2 km S of the centre of the village of Llangynin.	9401	See more images
St Ystyffan's Church	Llansteffan; SN3500910708; 51°46′14″N 4°23′34″W	30 November 1966	Church	Within a stone walled cemetery, on the SW corner of the junction of High Street and Church Street.	9404	See more images
Vale View, Llansteffan	Llansteffan; SN3493610704; 51°46′14″N 4°23′37″W	30 November 1966	House	Set slightly back from the street, on the S side of the road, within a small railed forecourt, immediately W of Brook Cottages.	9406	Upload Photo
St Mary Magdalene's Parish Church, St Clears	St Clears; SN2815115739; 51°48′50″N 4°29′40″W	30 November 1966	Church	Within a cemetery behind the street, reached via a lych-gate opposite the Town Hall.	9409	See more images
Rhydarwen	Llanarthney; SN5588019469; 51°51′19″N 4°05′39″W	13 December 1971	Farmhouse	At north of the B4300, 2?km east of the village of Llanarthney. Small farmyard at west. Stone wall facing the farmyard and to the roadside. Additional reference numbers: Coflein 17769	9417	Upload Photo
Carmarthen Guildhall	Carmarthen; SN4121220020; 51°51′22″N 4°18′26″W	18 August 1954	Guildhall	At upper end of Guildhall Square.	9450	See more images
No 51 King Street including near-detached rear wing	Carmarthen; SN4134220111; 51°51′25″N 4°18′19″W	19 May 1981		Opposite Post Office.	9471	No 51 King Street including near-detached rear wing
Capel Heol Awst, Carmarthen	Carmarthen; SN4090620031; 51°51′22″N 4°18′42″W	19 May 1981	Chapel	Set back in railed forecourt roughly midway along Lammas Street.	9488	See more images
St Mary's Church, Llanllwch	Llanllwch; SN3858318782; 51°50′39″N 4°20′41″W	19 May 1981	Church	In centre of Llanllwch village.	9495	See more images
2 Quay Street	Carmarthen; SN4120819988; 51°51′21″N 4°18′26″W	18 August 1954	House	5m SW of junction with St Mary's Street.	9556	2 Quay Street
Ty Gelli Aur/Golden Grove House, with steps and railings	Carmarthen; SN4117319928; 51°51′19″N 4°18′27″W	18 August 1954	House	15m NE of junction with Little Bridge Street.	9561	Ty Gelli Aur/Golden Grove House, with steps and railings
St Martin's Parish Church, Laugharne	Laugharne, Laugharne Township; SN3021311437; 51°46′33″N 4°27′45″W	30 November 1966	Church		9623	See more images
Great House, Laugharne	Laugharne Township; SN3015011061; 51°46′21″N 4°27′47″W	30 November 1966	House		9650	See more images
Castle House, Laugharne	Laugharne Township; SN3021210813; 51°46′13″N 4°27′44″W	30 November 1966	House	Pink-painted stucco walls. Market Street, opposite Town Hall	9657	See more images
Laugharne Town Hall	Laugharne Township; SN3020610838; 51°46′13″N 4°27′44″W	12 March 1951	Town Hall		9659	See more images
Newcastle Emlyn Bridge	Newcastle Emlyn; SN3091340861; 52°02′25″N 4°28′00″W	21 September 1964	Bridge		9686	Newcastle Emlyn Bridge
The Bunch of Grapes Inn	Newcastle Emlyn; SN3087440748; 52°02′21″N 4°28′02″W	8 May 1991	Inn		9692	The Bunch of Grapes Inn
Felin Wen (White Mill)	Abergwili; SN4625521442; 51°52′13″N 4°14′04″W	6 April 1974	Mill	On the S side of the road through White Mill hamlet, opposite a junction with a minor road to Capel Gwyn.	9720	Upload Photo
Cenarth Mill	Cenarth; SN2700941575; 52°02′44″N 4°31′26″W	1 August 1975	Mill	On riverside, down track 100 m NE of the White Hart Inn.	9723	See more images
Gilfach-y-Berthog	Abergwili; SN4813222958; 51°53′04″N 4°12′29″W	24 September 1991	House	Approximately 2.5km NE of Whitemill, reached by farm road on the N side of a minor road 0.75km W of Llanfihangel-uwch-gwili. Additional reference numbers: Coflein 17364	9738	Upload Photo
English Baptist Church, Carmarthen	Carmarthen; SN4106720098; 51°51′24″N 4°18′33″W	19 May 1981	Church	Set back from the street in paved forecourt, between 7 and 8 Lammas Street	9741	See more images
Capel y Graig including attached schoolroom and forecourt railings	Trelech; SN2817830337; 51°56′42″N 4°30′05″W	16 December 1993	Chapel	Just W of the road junction in the centre of Trelech village.	9758	Capel y Graig including attached schoolroom and forecourt railings
Derwydd Mansion	Llandybie; SN6126117836; 51°50′31″N 4°00′55″W	26 November 1951	House	In private grounds about 2km north-north-west of Llandybie village.	10903	Upload Photo
Pantycelyn Farmhouse	Llanfair ar y Bryn; SN8199935402; 52°00′16″N 3°43′14″W	26 November 1951	Farmhouse	Down a lane 300 m E of the centre of Pentre-ty-gwyn village.	10905	See more images
Henllys	Cilycwm; SN7551036626; 52°00′51″N 3°48′55″W	7 August 1966	House	About 1 km NNW of Dolauhirion Bridge, approached from N via drive off road to Siloh, 250 m W of junction with road to Cilycwm.	10907	Henllys
St Cynwyl's Church, Caeo	Cynwyl Gaeo; SN6750739907; 52°02′30″N 3°56′00″W	7 August 1966	Church		10908	See more images
Cwrt Bryn y Beirdd	Dyffryn Cennen; SN6630718093; 51°50′43″N 3°56′32″W	7 August 1966	Farmhouse	SE of Trap, reached by drive running E from crossroads about 1 km S of Trap. Additional reference numbers: Coflein 17280	10909	Upload Photo
St Simon and St Jude's Church, Llanddeusant	Llanddeusant; SN7769424533; 51°54′21″N 3°46′45″W	7 August 1966	Church	On ridge above upper Sawdde valley 2.5 km E of Twynllanan on road to Llyn y Fan Fach.	10914	See more images
St Tybie's Church	Llandybie; SN6182315550; 51°49′17″N 4°00′22″W	7 August 1966	Church	At the centre of Llandybie village. Large stone-walled graveyard to north side (recent parts walled in concrete blocks). High wall with steps and iron gates from the street at west and south; stile beside south gate. Church House at south-east.	10915	See more images
Cil-yr-ychen Lime Kilns	Llandybie; SN6166416761; 51°49′56″N 4°00′33″W	7 August 1966	Lime Kilns	Prominently sited 200m to the west of Llandeilo Road, about 1? km north of Llandybie village.	10916	Cil-yr-ychen Lime Kilns
Pont Llandeilo-yr-ynys	Llanegwad; SN4932620300; 51°51′39″N 4°11′22″W	7 August 1966	Bridge	Spanning the Afon Tywi approximately 1.4km S of Nantgaredig. Also known as Rhynnws Bridge, Pont-newydd or Newbridge. Also in Llanarthney.	10921	Pont Llandeilo-yr-ynys
Cynghordy Viaduct	Llanfair ar y Bryn; SN8083541752; 52°03′41″N 3°44′23″W	7 August 1966	Viaduct	Approximately 1.5km N of Cynghordy crossing the valley of the Afon Bran.	10922	See more images
Golden Grove Mansion	Llanfihangel Aberbythych; SN5971019857; 51°51′35″N 4°02′19″W	7 August 1966	Country house	In park landscape to the south of, and overlooking, the Towy valley, 4 km south-west of Llandeilo. Two gate-lodges to the B4300 at north. A third, which is at the present principal park entrance, is in the village of Golden Grove.	10926	See more images
St Egwad's Church	Llanfynydd; SN5584027618; 51°55′42″N 4°05′53″W	7 August 1966		In a round churchyard in the centre of the village.	10927	See more images
Pont Cothi	Abergorlech, Llanfynydd; SN5847233572; 51°58′57″N 4°03′44″W	7 August 1966	Bridge	Spanning the Afon Cothi in the centre of Abergorlech, on the border between Llanfynydd and Llanfihangel Rhos y Corn communities.	10928	Pont Cothi
St Cathen's Church	Llangathen; SN5845022142; 51°52′47″N 4°03′28″W	7 August 1966	Church	In a large churchyard occupying a high position at the S end of the village of Llangathen.	10929	See more images
Llethr Cadfan Farmhouse including former 'granary' building	Llangathen; SN5781623135; 51°53′19″N 4°04′03″W	7 August 1966		Set back on the W side of a minor road 0.5km N of the crossroads with the A40 in Broad Oak.	10932	Upload Photo
Saint Cadoc's Church, Llangadog	Llangadog; SN7062328456; 51°56′22″N 3°53′01″W	7 August 1966	Church	Towards the upper end of Church Street, in large churchyard with stone boundary wall.	10936	See more images
Church House, Llangadog	Llangadog; SN7064228414; 51°56′21″N 3°52′59″W	7 August 1966	House	On E side of street, just S of churchyard.	10937	Church House, Llangadog
Red Lion Hotel, Llangadog	Llangadog; SN7065028350; 51°56′19″N 3°52′59″W	7 August 1966	Inn	Situated prominently in centre of Church Street.	10940	Red Lion Hotel, Llangadog
Plas Glansevin	Llangadog; SN7305028635; 51°56′30″N 3°50′54″W	7 August 1966	Hall	About 2 km E of Llangadog near the River Bran.	10943	Upload Photo
Bont-ar-Towy	Llansadwrn; SN6951028620; 51°56′27″N 3°53′59″W	7 August 1966	Bridge	Bridge over River Towy on A4069 road to Llangadog, just E of A40.	10947	Upload Photo
Castle Green including front railings and gate	Llansawel; SN6202836398; 52°00′32″N 4°00′42″W	7 August 1966			10950	Castle Green including front railings and gate
The Dairy, Edwinsford	Llansawel; SN6317434668; 51°59′37″N 3°59′39″W	7 August 1966			10952	Upload Photo
Edwinsford Home Farm, Edwinsford	Llansawel; SN6316934688; 51°59′37″N 3°59′40″W	7 August 1966			10953	Upload Photo
Neuadd Fawr	Llanwrda; SN7138031666; 51°58′07″N 3°52′25″W	7 August 1966		In village on E bank of the Afon Dulais, with short approach just NE of Pont y Neuadd.	10956	Upload Photo
Llandovery Castle	Llandovery; SN7675734226; 51°59′34″N 3°47′47″W	3 August 1966		On prominent natural outcrop overlooking Afon Bran, on SE of main car park.	10965	See more images
Ty-Ficar Pritchard	Llandovery; SN7705134355; 51°59′38″N 3°47′32″W	3 August 1966		On street line 100 m W of Pont a'r Fran.	10984	See more images
St Dingat's Church, Llandovery	Llandovery; SN7637634086; 51°59′29″N 3°48′07″W	3 August 1966	Church	In large churchyard towards SW edge of town.	10991	See more images
Tabernacle Chapel, Llandovery	Llandovery; SN7687734423; 51°59′40″N 3°47′41″W	26 February 1981	Chapel	Set back from road in own courtyard, c30m from junction with Water Street.	11018	Upload Photo
Llandeilo Bridge	Llandeilo; SN6275922009; 51°52′47″N 3°59′43″W	14 March 1966	Bridge	Spanning the River Towy and linking Llandeilo with Ffairfach; partly in Dyffryn Cennen community	11040	See more images
Plas Dinefwr	Llandeilo; SN6143222529; 51°53′03″N 4°00′53″W	7 August 1966	Hall		11098	See more images
Summer house at Plas Dinefwr	Llandeilo; SN6140922502; 51°53′02″N 4°00′54″W	7 August 1966	Summerhouse		11099	Summer house at Plas Dinefwr
Inner courtyard ranges at Dynevor Castle	Llandeilo; SN6141822474; 51°53′01″N 4°00′54″W	7 August 1966	Castle		11102	Inner courtyard ranges at Dynevor Castle
Outer courtyard ranges at Dynevor Castle	Llandeilo; SN6142722434; 51°53′00″N 4°00′53″W	7 August 1966	Castle		11103	Outer courtyard ranges at Dynevor Castle
Farmhouse at Gelli Cefn y Rhos, Cwmdu	Gelli Cefn y Rhos, Talley; SN6400531311; 51°57′49″N 3°58′51″W	28 April 1975	Farmhouse		11129	Upload Photo
St Michael's Church, Talley	Talley; SN6325432824; 51°58′37″N 3°59′32″W	7 August 1966	Church		11151	See more images
Aberglasney	Llangathen; SN5813722136; 51°52′47″N 4°03′45″W	26 November 1951	Country house	Approximately 300m W of Llangathen church, set in its own grounds on the W side of a minor road between Llangathen and the A40 at Broad Oak.	11153	See more images
Arcaded terrace walks enclosing walled garden at Aberglasney	Llangathen; SN5809922108; 51°52′46″N 4°03′47″W	20 September 1990		On the W side of the house.	11154	Arcaded terrace walks enclosing walled garden at Aberglasney
Gatehouse at Aberglasney	Llangathen; SN5810122161; 51°52′48″N 4°03′47″W	20 September 1990	Gatehouse	On the NW side of the house.	11156	Gatehouse at Aberglasney
Old Bethel Chapel	Cwmamman; SN6815114400; 51°48′46″N 3°54′51″W	9 March 1991	Chapel	Located on a remote upland plateau on the N side of the Amman Valley approximately 1 km from the A474. Reached along short lane off mountain road at the lower end of a walled and gated burial ground.	11168	Old Bethel Chapel
Court Henry	Llangathen; SN5566422560; 51°52′58″N 4°05′54″W	7 August 1966	House	In its own grounds on the W side of a minor road approximately 0.6km N of the A40 at its junction with the B4297.	11176	Upload Photo
Erryd	Cilycwm; SN7540438095; 52°01′38″N 3°49′03″W	29 March 1993	House	2km S of Cilycwm on W side of Towy, approached by short drive E from road to Llandovery.	11179	Upload Photo
Aberdeunant	Llansadwrn; SN6714730764; 51°57′34″N 3°56′06″W	5 July 1993	House	400 m up lane running N from Taliaris to Llansadwrn road, 3 km ENE of junction with B4302.	11180	Upload Photo
The Raby Furnace	Llanelli Rural; SN5039101507; 51°41′32″N 4°09′57″W	3 March 1966	Furnace	100 m north of Stradey Park Hotel at the east side of a culverted stream in a deep valley beside the B4309.	11870	Upload Photo
St Non's Church	Llannon; SN5397408475; 51°45′21″N 4°07′01″W	3 March 1966	Church	In the centre of the village in a churchyard with stone wall and iron railings and gates to road at west; stone wall to minor road at north.	11871	See more images
St Illtyd's Church, Pembrey	Pembrey, Pembrey and Burry Port; SN4285401217; 51°41′16″N 4°16′29″W	3 March 1966	Church	In a large churchyard on the E side of the main square, and immediately S of the A484. Additional reference numbers: Coflein 101623	11872	See more images
Pont Spwdwr (Spudder's Bridge)	Trimsaran; SN4339205879; 51°43′47″N 4°16′09″W	3 March 1966	Bridge	Approximately 2km NW of Trimsaran village centre, by-passed by and set back from the modern road.	11875	See more images
Kidwelly town gate	Kidwelly; SN4072406941; 51°44′19″N 4°18′29″W	12 May 1963	Town gate	At SW end of Castle Street, 130 m WSW of Kidwelly Castle.	11877	See more images
Dovecote NW of Coleman Farm	Kidwelly; SN3964107187; 51°44′25″N 4°19′26″W	12 May 1963	Dovecote	In patch of scrub woodland at intersection of four fields on hillside 300 m NW of Coleman Farm, which is on the lower road from Kidwelly to Ferryside via St Ishmael. Additional reference numbers: Coflein 31585	11879	Dovecote NW of Coleman Farm
Stradey Castle	Llanelli Rural; SN4910901537; 51°41′32″N 4°11′04″W	9 February 1986	House	Entered by private drive from the B4308. House on terraced site with main basement area including external stairs to north-west. Landscaped parkland with woods to north. Terrace retaining-wall to south front with crenellated outer turrets.	11884	See more images
St Ellyw's Parish Church, Llanelli	Llanelli; SN5069900539; 51°41′01″N 4°09′40″W	30 November 1964	Church		11888	See more images
Tabernacle Chapel, including forecourt railings	Llanelli; SN5051000394; 51°40′57″N 4°09′49″W	3 December 1992	Chapel		11900	See more images
Carreg Cennen House	Dyffryn Cennen; SN6531319282; 51°51′21″N 3°57′26″W	18 April 1991		About 0.5 km N of Trap, approached by avenue of limes from gates set in stone flanking walls on E side of road to Llandeilo.	15616	Upload Photo
St Michael's Church, Llanfihangel ar Arth	Llanfihangel ar Arth; SN4560839922; 52°02′10″N 4°15′08″W	23 June 1967		At the N end of Llanfihangel ar Arth village, set in a walled churchyard overlooking the Teifi valley.	15631	See more images
Edwinsford, Llansawel	Talley; SN6312034581; 51°59′34″N 3°59′42″W	26 November 1951			15766	Upload Photo
Pont Newydd	Cilycwm; SN7581538432; 52°01′49″N 3°48′42″W	29 November 1995	Bridge	1.5 km S of Cilycwm on road to Llandovery.	16986	Pont Newydd
The Coach house at Henllys	Cilycwm; SN7549236667; 52°00′52″N 3°48′56″W	29 November 1995			17000	Upload Photo
Tinhouse, Old Castle Tinplate Works	Llanelli; SS5049499006; 51°40′12″N 4°09′48″W	31 July 1997		On the western side of Llanelli, S of the A484.	18657	Upload Photo
Church of St Margaret of Antioch, Pendine	Pendine; SN2287308787; 51°44′59″N 4°34′03″W	31 October 1997	Church	About 1 km above Dolwen Point, in churchyard near junction of B4314 and minor road to Marros.	19014	See more images
Capel Brynseion	Cwmamman; SN6754913574; 51°48′18″N 3°55′21″W	1 September 1998	Chapel	In the centre of Glanamman, 25m S of A474 on the E side of High Street.	19220	Capel Brynseion
Cold-roll Engine-house at former Kidwelly Tinplate Works	Kidwelly; SN4219107937; 51°44′52″N 4°17′15″W	28 July 1998		At NE end of Kidwelly Industrial Museum site, which is 2 km NE of Kidwelly, in Gwendraeth Fach valley.	20197	Upload Photo
Felinfoel Brewery	Llanelli Rural; SN5176002052; 51°41′51″N 4°08′47″W	16 October 1998	Brewery	Prominently sited at E side of the A 476 in Felinfoel, Llanelli. Brewery yard to south and to rear. Office building to south.	20532	See more images
Hoffmann Kiln of Eclipse Brickworks	Llanelli Rural; SN5010305290; 51°43′34″N 4°10′18″W	16 October 1998		W side of the former Llanelli and Mynydd Mawr Railway, 1/2 km SE of Horeb. Site of siding with a passing loop and remains of brickwork loading platform at E. Site of moulding & drying shed and ruin of engine house (for tramway to claypit) at E.	20537	Upload Photo
Church of St Michael and all Angels, Llanelli	Llanelli Rural; SN5274301009; 51°41′19″N 4°07′54″W	16 October 1998		At the south side of Bryngwyn Road, Dafen. Stone wall to street and to west side; timber war-memorial lychgate.	20545	See more images
Llandeilo Bridge	Dyffryn Cennen; SN6275421989; 51°52′46″N 3°59′43″W	14 March 1966	Bridge	Spanning the River Towy and linking Llandeilo with Ffairfach; partly in Llandeilo community.	20900C	See more images
Cross Hands Public Hall	Cross Hands; SN5595713059; 51°47′51″N 4°05′25″W	1 December 1999		500m north-west of Crosshands crossroads	21086	Upload Photo
Cefnarthen Chapel	Llanfair-ar-y-Bryn; SN8393535059; 52°00′07″N 3°41′32″W	25 February 1999	chapel	At the end of a lane off a minor road leading from Pentrebach to Babel approximately 1km to the NW.	21395	Cefnarthen Chapel
Coedweddus	Llangadog; SN7436527762; 51°56′03″N 3°49′44″W	19 July 1999	Farmhouse	4 km E of Llangadog, reached by drive running N from lane to Llanddeusant. Additional reference numbers: Coflein 17230	21992	Upload Photo
Bont-ar-Towy	Llangadog; SN6952828619; 51°56′27″N 3°53′58″W	19 July 1999	Bridge	On A4069 about 1 km W of Llangadog, just E of junction with A40. Half of bridge is in Llansadwrn community. Additional reference numbers: Coflein 23994	21995	Upload Photo
Capel Libanus	Llansadwrn; SN6819931923; 51°58′12″N 3°55′12″W	29 July 1999	Chapel	On N side of lane 1.3 km W of Llansadwrn.	22122	Capel Libanus
Church of St Michael, Llanfihangel Aberbythych	Llanfihangel Aberbythych; SN5897119712; 51°51′29″N 4°02′57″W	27 August 1999	Church	In the village of Golden Grove to the west of the street, nearly opposite to Golden Grove park entrance. Stone-walled churchyard with stile; lychgate separately listed.	22179	See more images
Golden Grove Stable Block	Llanfihangel Aberbythych; SN5962419809; 51°51′33″N 4°02′23″W	27 August 1999	Stables	To the west of the service wing at Golden Grove, to which it is linked by yards and a covered way. Rubblestone enclosing wall at north, continuing the line of the terrace wall of the house.	22204	Upload Photo
Capel Panteg and attached vestry to left	Abergwili; SN4832225168; 51°54′16″N 4°12′22″W	9 February 1999		In a remote valley N of a minor road 4 km NE of Whitemill.	22268	Capel Panteg and attached vestry to left
Capel Salem including forecourt railings	Llangyndeyrn; SN4553913884; 51°48′08″N 4°14′30″W	9 February 1999	Chapel	In the centre of Llangyndeyrn approximately 250m SW of the B4306.	22269	Capel Salem including forecourt railings
Williams Pantycelyn Memorial Chapel	Llandovery; SN7690234387; 51°59′39″N 3°47′40″W	2 January 2000	Chapel	Near the centre of Llandovery on the N side of the High Street between Orchard Street and Water Street.	22801	See more images
Cyffig Church	Eglwyscummin; SN2081013933; 51°47′43″N 4°36′00″W	10 November 2000	Church	On the S side of a minor road 3 km SE of Whitland.	24116	See more images
Church of the Holy Trinity, Llanegwad	Pont-ar-Gothi, Llanegwad; SN5098022611; 51°52′56″N 4°09′59″W	5 February 2001	Church	About 1 km NE of Pont-ar-Gothi, in churchyard on the E side of a minor road and N bank of Afon Cothi.	25162	See more images
Pilgrims graves by ruins of St Michael's Church	St Clears; SN3027613338; 51°47′34″N 4°27′45″W	6 November 2001	Graves	In enclosed cemetery, immediately S of the church ruins.	25491	Pilgrims graves by ruins of St Michael's Church
Pilgrim's Graves S of ruins of St Michaels Church	St Clears; SN3028713313; 51°47′34″N 4°27′44″W	6 November 2001	Graves	Near S perimeter of the cemetery.	25492	Upload Photo
W. R. H. Powell memorial in churchyard and iron railings	Llanboidy; SN2166223238; 51°52′45″N 4°35′32″W	8 June 2001	Memorial	In the churchyard in Llanboidy village, to the E of the parish church.	25616	See more images
Allt-y-Cafan Bridge	Llangeler; SN3867539205; 52°01′40″N 4°21′10″W	6 April 1996	Bridge	Spanning the river Teifi on the County boundary with Ceredigion on the road N of Pentrecwrt. Also in Ceredigion.	25706	Allt-y-Cafan Bridge
Church of St Cynog, Llangynog	Llangynog; SN3385114929; 51°48′30″N 4°24′41″W	17 October 2001	Church	About 1 km S of Llangynog.	25800	See more images
Coach House and Stable Range at Y Plas	Llansteffan; SN3487910432; 51°46′05″N 4°23′40″W	11 May 2002	Coach House/Stables	Located SW of Plas mansion, at the end of a private access road leading S from Llansteffan village.	27075	Coach House and Stable Range at Y Plas
White Bridge (The bascule railway bridge)	Carmarthen/ Llangunnor; SN4051419246; 51°50′56″N 4°19′01″W	12 May 2002	Bascule bridge	Railway bridge over Towy river between Carmarthen and Llangunnor.	80709	White Bridge (The bascule railway bridge)
Former Kidwelly & Llanelly Canal aqueduct	Trimsaran; SN4275705300; 51°43′28″N 4°16′41″W	23 July 2003	Aqueduct	Spanning the Afon Gwendraeth Fawr NW of Morfa Mawr Farm, approximately 600m NW of Llandyry church.	81323	Upload Photo
Dome gunnery trainer at Pembrey Airfield	Pembrey and Burryport; SN4075703714; 51°42′34″N 4°18′22″W	25 November 2003	Dome trainer building	In a field on the E side of the former airfield, approximately 550m NW of Brooklands Farmhouse.	82066	Dome gunnery trainer at Pembrey Airfield

== See also ==
- Grade I listed buildings in Carmarthenshire
- Registered historic parks and gardens in Carmarthenshire
