= List of bridges in Wales =

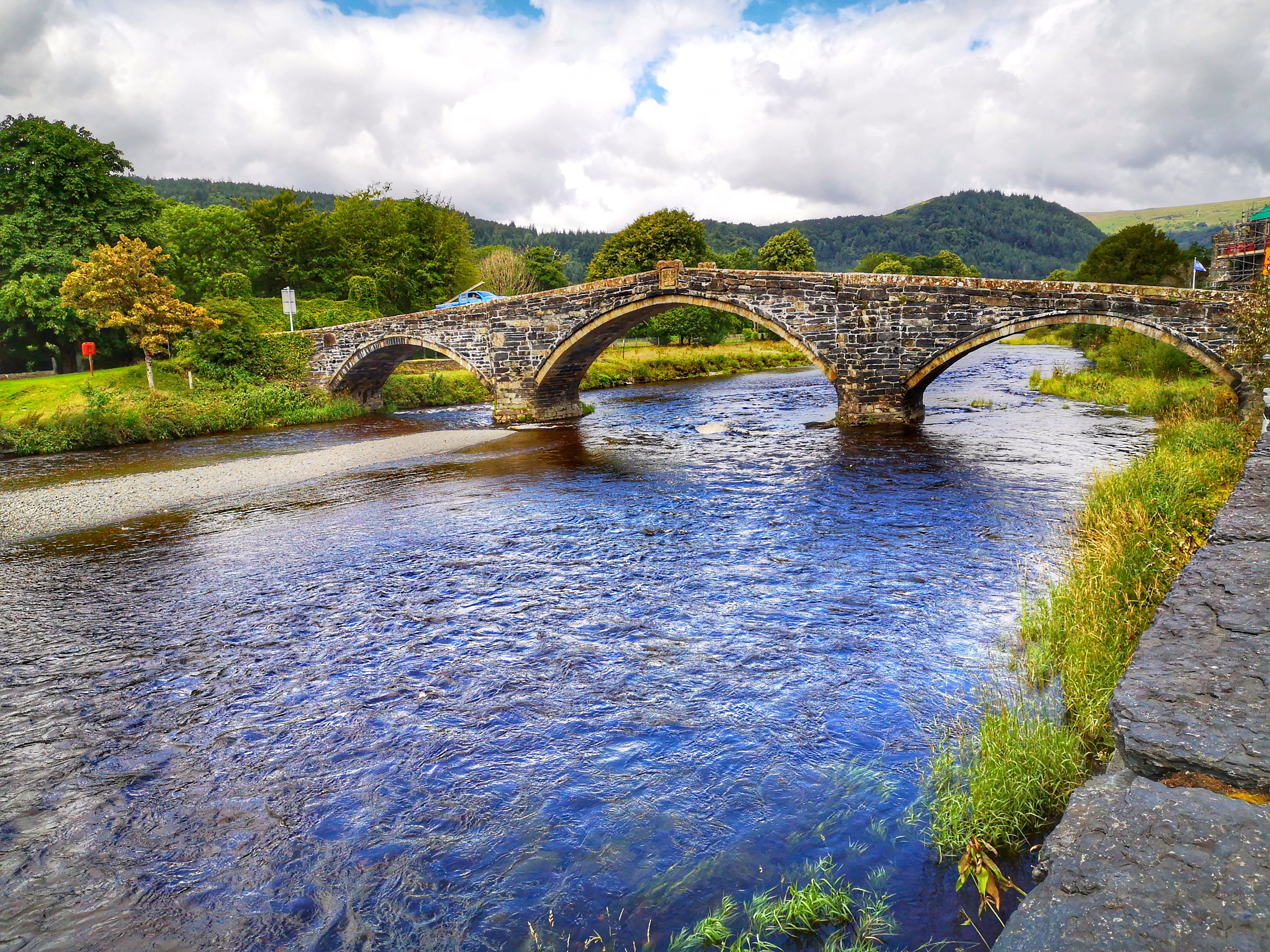
Pont Fawr, Llanrwst

This list of bridges in Wales lists bridges of particular historical, scenic, architectural or engineering interest in Wales. Road and railway bridges, viaducts, aqueducts and footbridges are included.

== List ==
Bridges are listed under the names used by Cadw, (Note: Cadw is the historic environment service of the Welsh Government) or the names most commonly used, which may be English or Welsh names. Where a bridge links two counties, it is listed under the first county alphabetically, unless associated by name with a settlement predominantly in the other county. The original Severn Bridge is not listed as it reaches land on the Gloucestershire side of the River Wye, the road crossing into Wales on the Wye Bridge.

| Name | Date | Heritage Status | Image | Historic county | Principal area | Notes |
|---|---|---|---|---|---|---|
| Bangor Bridge, Bangor is y Coed | 1663 (Note: Doubtful image is a 1663 stone bridge) | I | | Flintshire | Wrexham | Spans River Dee. |
| Barmouth Bridge | 1860s | II* | | Merionethshire | Gwynedd | Largely wooden railway viaduct, incorporating footbridge. |
| Bigsweir Bridge | 1826–29 | II* | | Monmouthshire | Monmouthshire | Spans the River Wye near St. Briavels, built as part of turnpike road between Chepstow and Monmouth. |
| Blaen y Cwm Viaduct | | II | | Monmouthshire | Blaenau Gwent | Near Tredegar. |
| Blackpool Bridge | c. 1825 | II* | | Pembrokeshire | Pembrokeshire | Spans Eastern Cleddau at Slebech. |
| Britannia Bridge | 1850–1972 | II | | Anglesey | Anglesey | Originally tubular bridge, rebuilt after fire in 1970 caused by children. SH541710 |
| Bont Dolgadfan | 18th century? | II | | Montgomeryshire | Powys | On old drovers' route from Machynlleth to Welshpool. |
| Bont Fechan, Llanystumdwy | | II | | Caernarfonshire | Gwynedd | Spans Afon Dwyfach. |
| Bont Newydd | | II | | Caernarfonshire | Gwynedd | On the road to Aber Falls. SH662720 |
| Brecon, Usk Bridge | 1563 | I | | Brecknockshire | Powys | Links Bridge Street with Watergate. |
| Bridgend, Old Bridge | c. 1425 | II* | | Glamorgan | Bridgend | Repaired after flood damage 1775, restored 2005, now footbridge. |
| Brynderwen Bridge | 1852 | II* | | Montgomeryshire | Powys | Across the River Severn, designed by Thomas Penson. |
| Builth Wells, Wye Bridge | 1779 | II | | Radnorshire | Powys | Widened 1925. |
| Buttington Bridge | 1872 | II | | Montgomeryshire | Powys | Across the River Severn. |
| Caerhowel Bridge | 1858 | II | | Montgomeryshire | Powys | Across the River Severn, designed by Thomas Penson. |
| Caergwrle Packhorse Bridge | 17th century | II* | | Flintshire | Flintshire | Restored after damaged by floods, 2000. |
| Caerleon Bridge | 1806 | II | | Monmouthshire | Newport | Replaced earlier wooden bridge. |
| Caersws Bridge | 1821 | II | | Montgomeryshire | Powys | Across the River Severn, designed by Thomas Penson. |
| Cardiff Bridge | 1931 | II | | Glamorgan | Cardiff | Repeatedly rebuilt during C18–C19th following flood damage. |
| Cardigan Bridge | 1726 | II* | | Cardiganshire | Ceredigion | Widened and strengthened 1877-8. |
| Carew Bridge | 18th century | II* | | Pembrokeshire | Pembrokeshire | Across the Carew River |
| Carmarthen Bridge | 1937–38 | II | | Carmarthenshire | Carmarthenshire | Replaced medieval six arch bridge. |
| Carmarthen, Pont King Morgan | 2006 | | | Carmarthenshire | Carmarthenshire | Cable-stayed bridge, footbridge. |
| Cefn Coed Viaduct | 1866 | II* | | Glamorgan | Merthyr Tydfil | Formerly carried the Brecon and Merthyr Railway over the River Taff, now carries the Taff Trail at Cefn-coed-y-cymmer. |
| Cefn Viaduct | 1848 | II* | | Denbighshire | Wrexham | Built by Thomas Brassey to carry the Shrewsbury and Chester Railway across the valley of the River Dee. |
| The Celtic Gateway | 2006 | | | Anglesey | Anglesey | Footbridge linking the centre of Holyhead with the inner harbour ferry terminal and railway station. |
| Cenarth, Cenarth Bridge | 1787 | II* | | Carmarthenshire | Carmarthenshire | By David Edwards, son of William Edwards. |
| Chepstow, Old Wye Bridge | 1816 | I | | Monmouthshire | Monmouthshire | Designed by John Raistrick. |
| Chepstow Railway Bridge | 1852 | II | | Monmouthshire | Monmouthshire | Designed by Brunel, subsequently largely rebuilt on original piers and abutments. |
| Chirk Aqueduct | 1801 | II* | | Denbighshire | Wrexham | Carries the Llangollen Canal across the Ceiriog Valley, partly in Wales, 710 ft (220 m) long. |
| Chirk Viaduct | 1846–48 | II* | | Denbighshire | Wrexham | Adjacent to aqueduct, spans the Ceiriog Valley, partly in Wales, about 98 ft (30 m) high. |
| Forden, Cil-cewydd Bridge | 1861 | II | | Montgomeryshire | Powys | Across the River Severn, designed by Thomas Penson. |
| Aberbechan, Cilgwrgan Bridge | 1862 | II | | Montgomeryshire | Powys | Across the River Severn. |
| Cleddau Bridge | 1975 | | | Pembrokeshire | Pembrokeshire | Box girder bridge, partly collapsed during construction in 1970, the last major bridge disaster in the UK. |
| Conwy Railway Bridge | 1848 | I | | Caernarfonshire | Conwy | Tubular bridge built by Robert Stephenson to a design by William Fairbairn, precursor of Britannia Bridge. |
| Conwy Suspension Bridge | 1826 | I | | Caernarfonshire | Conwy | Built by Thomas Telford. |
| Rossett, Cook's Bridge | 19th century | II | | Denbighshire | Wrexham | Spans River Alyn. |
| Crickhowell Bridge | 1706 | I | | Brecknockshire | Powys | Widened and repaired following damage by floods in 1808. |
| Cwm Prysor Railway Viaduct (Blaen-y-Cwm Viaduct) | 1882 | II | | Gwynedd | Gwynedd | Carried former Bala and Festiniog Railway over Afon Prysor. Closed 1961. |
| Cynghordy Viaduct | 1867 | II* | | Carmarthenshire | Carmarthenshire | Crosses the valley of the Afon Brân at Cynghordy. |
| Devil's Bridge | 1075–1901 | II* | | Cardiganshire | Ceredigion | Three bridges of 1075, 1753 and 1901, built one above the other, across deep gorge of Afon Mynach. |
| Dolauhirion Bridge | 1773 | I | | Carmarthenshire | Carmarthenshire | By William Edwards |
| Dolgellau, Y Bont Fawr | 1638 | II | | Merionethshire | Gwynedd | Widened and extended. |
| Farndon Bridge | c. 1345 | I | | Denbighshire | Wrexham | Spans River Dee between Cheshire and Denbighshire. Little altered apart from abutments and flood arches. |
| Felindre Bridge, Llanidloes | 1848 | II | | Montgomeryshire | Powys | Across the River Severn, designed by Thomas Penson. |
| Flintshire Bridge | 1998 | | | Flintshire | Flintshire | Cable-stayed bridge spanning canalised section of River Dee. |
| Four Mile Bridge | | | | Anglesey | Anglesey | Stone bridge between Holy Island and the Anglesey mainland. |
| Garndiffaith Railway Viaduct | 1874 | II | | Monmouthshire | Torfaen | Carried former Brynmawr and Blaenavon Railway over the river Ffrwd. |
| Gelli Bridge. Llawhaden | 18th century | II | | Pembrokeshire | Pembrokeshire | At confluence of Eastern Cleddau and River Syfynwy. |
| Halfway Bridge, Llandygai | | II | | Caernarfonshire | Gwynedd | Spans Afon Ogwen. |
| Hawarden Bridge | 1887–89 | | | Flintshire | Flintshire | Swing bridge, now welded shut, carries railway across River Dee. |
| Hengoed Viaduct | | II* | | Glamorgan | Caerphilly | Crosses the River Rhymney, now cycle/footpath. |
| Kittlehill Packhorse Bridge, Landimore | | II | | Glamorgan | Swansea | Crosses Burry Pill, Gower Peninsula. |
| Knucklas Viaduct | 1865 | II* | | Radnorshire | Powys | Thirteen arches. |
| Landore Railway Viaduct | 1850 | | | Glamorgan | West Glamorgan | Carries South Wales Main Line over the Swansea valley |
| Leckwith Old Bridge | 16th century? | II* | | Glamorgan | Cardiff/Vale of Glamorgan | Across the River Ely. |
| Llanbedr Bridge, Llanbedr | | II | | Brecknockshire | Powys | Spans Grwyne Fechan. |
| Llandderfel, Pont Fawr | | II* | | Merionethshire | Gwynedd | Spans the River Dee. |
| Llandeilo Bridge | 1843–48 | II* | | Carmarthenshire | Carmarthenshire | Replaced medieval seven arch bridge. |
| Llandeilo Railway Bridge | | II | | Carmarthenshire | Carmarthenshire | Lattice girder bridge. |
| Llandinam Bridge | 1846 | II* | | Montgomeryshire | Powys | Across the River Severn at Llandinam, designed by Thomas Penson. |
| Llandrinio Bridge | 1775 | I | | Montgomeryshire | Powys | At Llandrinio. Strengthened to carry modern traffic in 1977. |
| Llanellen Bridge | 1821 | II | | Monmouthshire | Monmouthshire | Built by John Upton of Gloucester. |
| Llanfechain Bridge | | II | | Montgomeryshire | Powys | Over the River Cain. |
| Llangollen Bridge | 16–20th century | I | | Denbighshire | Denbighshire | At Llangollen, originally built by Henry I, reconstructed in 1346, replaced 16th century, widened 1873 and 1968. |
| Llangynidr Bridge | 18th century | I | | Brecknockshire | Powys | Spans the River Usk at Llangynidr. |
| Llanidloes, Long Bridge | | II | | Montgomeryshire | Powys | Across the River Severn, designed by Thomas Penson. |
| Llanidloes, Short Bridge | | II | | Montgomeryshire | Powys | Designed by Thomas Penson. |
| Llandysul Bridge | | II | | Cardiganshire | Ceredigion | Replaced three arch bridge partly demolished by Royalists during Civil War. |
| Llanrwst, Pont Fawr | 1636 | I | | Denbighshire | Conwy | Designed by Inigo Jones. |
| Llawhaden Bridge | | II* | | Pembrokeshire | Pembrokeshire | At Llawhaden. Repaired 1809. |
| Llechryd Bridge | 17th century | II* | | Cardiganshire | Ceredigion | Damaged by floods 2005. |
| Loughor Railway Viaduct | c. 1860, replaced 2013 | II | Road and rail bridges across the Loughor Estuary, linking Swansea County Borough with Carmarthenshire. | Carmarthenshire | Carmarthenshire | Originally timber, engineered by Brunel. |
| Machynlleth Bridge (Pont ar Dyfi) | 1805 | II* | | Montgomeryshire | Powys | Petition for replacement submitted 2011, following repeated damage by vehicles and floods. |
| Menai Suspension Bridge | 1826 | I | | Anglesey | Anglesey | Designed by Thomas Telford. |
| Merthyr Mawr, New Bridge | 1827 | II* | | Glamorgan | Bridgend | Inscription records the bridge was built at the expense of the Right Honourable Sir John Nicholl in 1827. |
| Merthyr Mawr, New Inn Bridge | 15th century | II* | | Glamorgan | Bridgend | Built with holes in the parapets through which farmers pushed their sheep for their annual dip. |
| Monmouth, Monnow Bridge | 1272 | I | | Monmouthshire | Monmouthshire | The only surviving medieval fortified river bridge with gateway in Great Britain, gatehouse added 14th century. |
| Monmouth, Wye Bridge | c. 1617 | II | | Monmouthshire | Monmouthshire | Widened 1879. |
| Monmouth Viaduct | 1861 | | | Monmouthshire | Monmouthshire | Coleford, Monmouth, Usk & Pontypool Railway over River Wye. Closed 1964. |
| Nevern Bridge | | II | | Pembrokeshire | Pembrokeshire | Spans River Nevern. |
| Newcastle Emlyn Bridge | | II* | | Carmarthenshire | Carmarthenshire | Spans the River Teifi. |
| Newport Bridge | 1927 | II | | Monmouthshire | Newport | Replaced bridge of 1800. |
| Newport, City Bridge | 2004 | | | Monmouthshire | Newport | Received British Constructional Steelwork Association Structural Steel Design Award in 2005. |
| Newport, City Footbridge | 2006 | | | Monmouthshire | Newport | Received George Gibby Award 2007. |
| Newport, George Street Bridge | 1964 | II* | | Monmouthshire | Newport | First cable-stayed bridge in the United Kingdom. |
| Newport Transporter Bridge | 1906 | I | | Monmouthshire | Newport | Designed by Ferdinand Arnodin, one of only 8 surviving transporter bridges in the world. |
| Newtown, Long Bridge | 1827 | II | | Montgomeryshire | Powys | Across the River Severn, designed by Thomas Penson. |
| Pant-y-Goitre Bridge | c. 1821 | II* | | Monmouthshire | Monmouthshire | Attributed to John Upton. |
| Penallt Railway Viaduct | 1876 | | | Monmouthshire | Monmouthshire | Formerly carried the Wye Valley Railway over the River Wye |
| Penmachno, Roman Bridge | | II | | Caernarfonshire | Conwy | Medieval packhorse bridge. |
| Penmaenpool Bridge | 1879 | II | | Merionethshire | Gwynedd | Wooden tollbridge across Afon Mawddach. |
| Pont Aberarth | 1849 | II | | Cardiganshire | Ceredigion | Spans the River Arth. |
| Pont Aberffraw | 1731 | II | | Anglesey | Anglesey | No longer in use for vehicles. |
| Pont Allt-y-Cafan | c. 1841 | II* | | Carmarthenshire | Carmarthenshire | Spans the River Teifi. |
| Pont Beddgelert | | II | | Caernarfonshire | Gwynedd | Spans Afon Colwyn. |
| Pont Briwet (Demolished) | 1867 – 2013 | II | | Merionethshire | Gwynedd | Wooden railway viaduct incorporating adjacent single-track road. Approval granted for demolition, February 2012. |
| Pont Crafnant | | II | | Merionethshire | Gwynedd | Spans River Artro east of Pentre Gwynfryn. |
| Pont Cothi, Abergorlech | 17–18th century | II* | | Carmarthenshire | Carmarthenshire | Inscription, "this bridge was mended by John Jones 1794". |
| Pont Carrog | | II* | | Merionethshire | Denbighshire | Spans River Dee. |
| Pont Cysylltau | 17–18th century | I | | Denbighshire | Wrexham | Between Trevor and Froncysyllte. |
| Pontcysyllte Aqueduct | 1805 | I | | Denbighshire | Wrexham | Built by Thomas Telford and William Jessop, UNESCO World Heritage Site. |
| Bryncrug, Pont Dysynni | | II | | Merionethshire | Gwynedd | Modern bridge alongside. |
| Ponterwyd Hen Bont | 18th century | II | | Cardiganshire | Ceredigion | Close to Georgian Ponterwyd Chapel. |
| Dyffryn Ardudwy, Pont Fadog | 1762 | II | | Merionethshire | Gwynedd | Carries old drover's road across Afon Ysgethin. |
| Cemmaes Road, Pont Felin y ffridd | | II | | Montgomeryshire | Powys | Carries the road from Machynlleth over the Afon Dulas. |
| Dolwyddelan, Pont Gethin | 1879 | II* | | Caernarfonshire | Gwynedd | Railway viaduct spanning the Lledr Valley. |
| Llanddewi Brefi, Pont Gogoyan | 18th century | II* | | Cardiganshire | Ceredigion | Spans River Teifi near Llanddewi Brefi. |
| Nantgaredig, Pont Llandeilo yr ynys | | II* | | Carmarthenshire | Carmarthenshire | Spans River Towy near Nantgaredig. |
| Dolgellau, Pont Llanelltyd | | II* | | Merionethshire | Gwynedd | Near Dolgellau, now footbridge. |
| Llanfair, Pont Llanfair | | II | | Cardiganshire | Ceredigion | Spans River Teifi at Llanfair Clydogau. |
| Dinas Cross, Pont Llanychaer | | II | | Pembrokeshire | Pembrokeshire | Spans River Gwaun. |
| Sennybridge, Pont Llwyncyntefin | | II | | Brecknockshire | Powys | Spans River Usk. |
| Bodorgan, Pont Marquis | | II | | Anglesey | Anglesey | Spans Afon Cefni, adjoining site of WWII POW camp. |
| Mallwyd, Pont Minllyn | 17th century | II | | Merionethshire | Gwynedd | Built by the local rector, Dr. John Davies. |
| Afon Ogwen, Pont Pen y benglog | | II | | Caernarfonshire | Gwynedd | Spans Afon Ogwen at west end of Llyn Ogwen, span of packhorse bridge still visible. |
| Pontrhydyfen, Pontrhydyfen Aqueduct | 1825 | II | | Glamorgan | Neath Port Talbot | Now part of pedestrian and cycle track. |
| Vaynor, Pontsarn Viaduct | | II* | | Brecknockshire | Merthyr Tydfil | Crosses the Afon Taff Fechan. |
| Bontddu, Pont Scethin | | Scheduled Monument | | Merionethshire | Gwynedd | Remote packhorse bridge on old coach route from London to Harlech. |
| Pont y Cafnau | 1793 | II* | | Glamorgan | Merthyr Tydfil | World's earliest surviving iron railway bridge, built for a tramway to the Cyfarthfa Ironworks. |
| Clynnog Fawr, Pont y Cim | 1612 | II | | Caernarfonshire | Gwynedd | Near Pontllyfni: an inscribed stone on the bridge reads "Pont Y Cim, Catring Bwkle hath give 20 povends to mack this brighe. 1612". |
| Llanberis, Pont y Gromlech | | II | | Caernarfonshire | Gwynedd | In Llanberis Pass. |
| Pont y Gwaith | 1811 | II | | Glamorgan | Merthyr Tydfil | "Bridge of the works" - referring to nearby ironworks. |
| Betws y Coed, Pont-y-Pair | 1468 | II* | | Caernarfonshire | Conwy | "Bridge of the cauldron". |
| Pontypridd, Old Bridge | 1756 | I | | Glamorgan | Rhondda Cynon Taf | Built by William Edwards, at 140 ft (43 m) the longest single-span bridge in Great Britain for 40 years. |
| Pont y Werin | 2010 | | | Glamorgan | Vale of Glamorgan | Bascule bridge between Cardiff International Sports Village and Penarth. |
| Porthkerry Viaduct | | II | | Glamorgan | Vale of Glamorgan | In country park. |
| Queensferry, Jubilee Bridge | 1926 | II | | Flintshire | Flintshire | Bascule bridge, no longer opens. Also known as the Blue Bridge. |
| Camrose, St Catherine's Bridge | | II | | Pembrokeshire | Pembrokeshire | Spans Western Cleddau. |
| St. Julian's railway bridge | 1874 | | | Monmouthshire | Newport | Carries the Welsh Marches Line across the River Usk |
| Second Severn Crossing | 1996 | | | Monmouthshire | Monmouthshire | 3.19 mi (5.13 km) long. |
| Stackpole, Eight-Arch Bridge | | II* | | Pembrokeshire | Pembrokeshire | On the Stackpole Estate, owned and maintained by the National Trust. |
| Swing Bridge, River Neath | 1892 | II | | Glamorgan | Neath Port Talbot | Carried the former Rhondda and Swansea Bay Railway line over the River Neath. Now permanently welded shut. |
| Usk, Usk Bridge | 1746–47 | II* | | Monmouthshire | Monmouthshire | Designed by William Edwards, enlarged 1836. |
| Usk Bridge, Newport | 1848 | | | Monmouthshire | Newport | Carries the Great Western Main Line across the River Usk |
| Waterloo Bridge, Betws-y-Coed | 1815 | I | | Caernarfonshire | Conwy | Early cast-iron bridge, designed by Thomas Telford. |
| Wye Bridge | 1966 | II | | Monmouthshire | Monmouthshire | Approach to the original Severn Bridge, 1,340 ft (410 m) long, strengthened in 1987. |

== See also ==
- List of bridges in the United Kingdom
- List of crossings of the River Severn
- List of crossings of the River Wye
