= Gilfach-y-Berthog =

Listed house in Wales

General information
- Location: Llanfihangel-uwch-gwili, Abergwili, Carmarthenshire, Wales
- Coordinates: 51.884446°N 4.207988°W

Listed Building – Grade II*
- Official name: Gilfach y Berthog
- Designated: 24 September 1991
- Reference no.: 9738

Gilfach-y-Berthog is a grade II* listed building in Abergwili, Carmarthenshire with grade II listed stables and barn.

== Description ==
Gilfach-y-Berthog is a late 17th-century minor gentry house. It is built from stone in a "T" shape and has two and a half storeys across the front and 3 storeys at the rear. It is 0.75 km (0.47 mi) west of Llanfihangel-uwch-gwili in the community of Abergwili in Carmarthenshire. It is one of the oldest surviving houses in the county.

It is built from rubble stone with a slate roof. It has external decorative plaster panels with concave-sided diamonds, which are uncharacteristic of South West Wales and more reminiscent of Montgomeryshire.

It is associated with a late 17th-century barn and an early 19th-century stable.

The threshing barn and byre building is located on the south-east side of the house. It is built from stone rubble and cruck-framed. It is in poor condition with collapsed sections of its roof.

The stables are located to the west of the house. It is a single-storey building built from limewashed rubble with a slate roof.

The house is from a similar period and has a similar plan to Neuadd Fawr near Llanwrda, another grade II* listed property in Carmarthenshire.

== History ==
Gilfach-y-Berthog dates from 1327, when it was owned by Owain ap Gruffudd, one of Edward III's knights. Llewelen Foethus, who established a chapel near Allt-y-ferin, may have lived there. It was remodelled and rebuilt in 1692, according to a date above the fireplace. It was also altered in the late Georgian era and late 19th century.

The barn was possibly also built in the 17th century, but could have been later. It was likely altered in the 19th century.

The property, along with its more than 87 acres, was sold in 1912 for £2,300.

It was designated grade II* listed in 1991. The stables were designated grade II listed also in 1991. The barn was grade II listed in 1992.

The property, including the farmhouse, outhouses and two acres of gardens including a pond and orchard, was offered for sale for £210,000 in 1990. In 1997, it was offered for sale again for £295,000. In 2001, a barn conversion was proposed at the property. Also in 2001, it was listed for sale by Caroline Jones, a historian of the Middle Ages.
