= Cenarth Bridge =

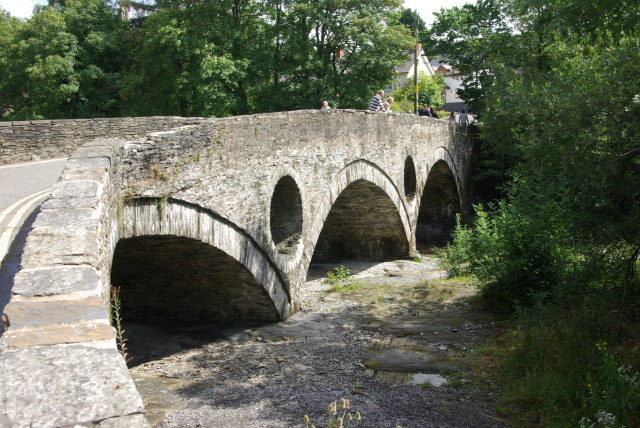
- Cenarth Bridge from the north bank (Ceredigion)
- Coordinates: 52°02′42″N 4°31′27″W
- Carries: A484 road
- Crosses: River Teifi
- Locale: Cenarth, Wales
- Heritage status: Scheduled monument

Characteristics
- Design: Arch bridge
- Width: 4.75 m (15.6 ft)
- Longest span: 12.2 m (40 ft)

History
- Designer: David Edwards
- Construction start: 1785
- Construction end: 1787

Location
- Interactive map of Cenarth Bridge

Cenarth Bridge (Welsh: Pont Cenarth), also spelt Kenarth Bridge, is a three arch bridge which spans the River Teifi at Cenarth, Carmarthenshire in Wales. The bridge was built between 1785 and 1787 and designed by David Edwards, the son of William Edwards who built the Old Bridge at Pontypridd. The bridge straddles the border between Carmarthenshire and Ceredigion. It is both a Grade II* listed structure and a scheduled monument.

== History and construction ==
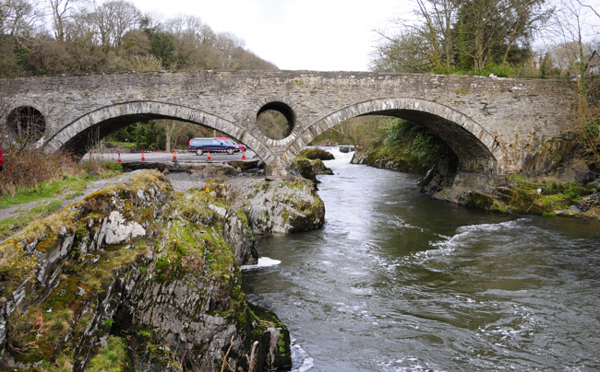
The bridge viewed from downstream north bank (Carmarthenshire right, Ceredigion left)

A bridge over the River Teifi at Cenarth has existed at least since 1188, when it was mentioned in the Itinerarium Kambriae of Gerald of Wales. The present bridge was constructed between 1785 and 1787 by Messrs Watkins and Webb. It was designed by David Edwards (born 1748), who also built the Llandeilo Yr Ynys bridge near Nantgaredig earlier in 1786 and the later Newport Bridge.

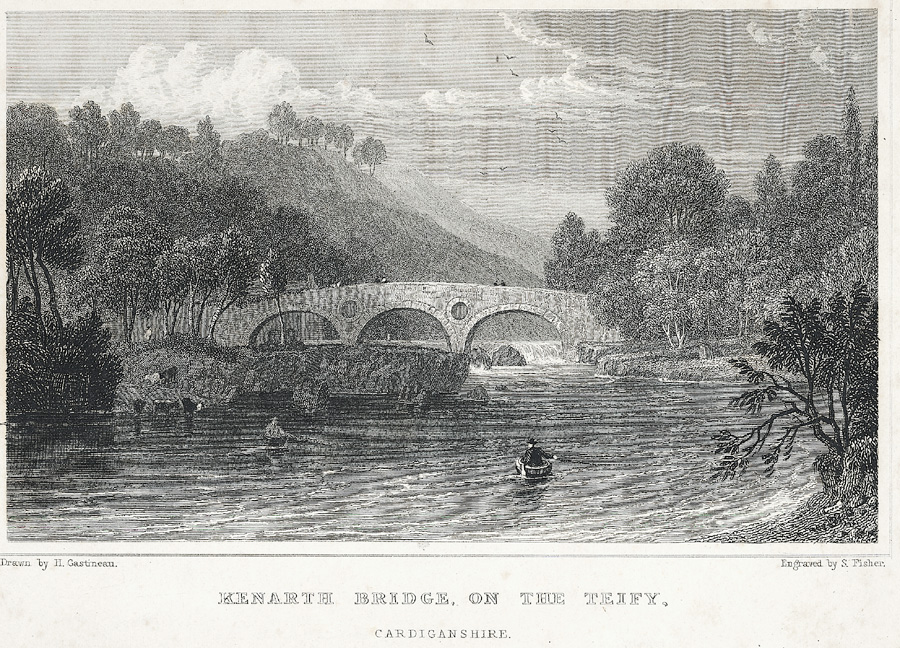
Kenarth Bridge c. 1840 by Henry Gastineau

The bridge was designed to carry horse-drawn vehicles and has three stone arches which span 11.6 m (38 ft), 11.9 m (39 ft) and 12.2 m (40 ft). The bridge is made of ashlar masonry and rubble stone with the parapet coping in rough slate. The design includes two cylindrical holes (perforated spandrels) 6 ft (1.8 m) in diameter, one either side of the central span. The holes were included in the design to reduce the weight of the structure and also to allow floodwaters to pass through them, instead of going over the top of the bridge: while the river appears to flow only under the southern arch, when in full flood the Teifi flows through all three arches. This feature was used by Edwards's father William, who used six holes in the Old Bridge at Pontypridd to reduce the weight and pressure on the centre section.

The accounts for the local quarter sessions show that in 1787 David Edwards was paid £2.12s.2d ster. for half his fee. Therefore his total fee for the bridge was £5.4s.4d. In 2014, this would have been worth between £6,600 and £9,100.

The bridge was widened in 1852 by Richard Kyrke Penson to make the right-angled bend at the north end easier to negotiate.

The bridge joins two counties, Carmarthenshire and Ceredigion. It forms part of the former turnpike, now the A484 road, from Carmarthen to Cardigan. It is 4.75 m (15.6 ft) wide, but it has no footpaths. It is still being used by motor traffic in the 2010s with a speed limit of 20 miles per hour (32 kilometres per hour).

The bridge was Grade II* listed in the 1960s, with the Carmarthenshire southern end listed on 21 September 1964 and the Ceredigion northern end listed later on 23 June 1967. The bridge is also a Scheduled Ancient Monument.

== See also ==
- List of bridges in Wales
- Cenarth Falls
