= Devil's Bridge (Welsh bridge) =

Bridge in Ceredigion, Wales

Devil's Bridge Pont ar Fynach (Welsh)
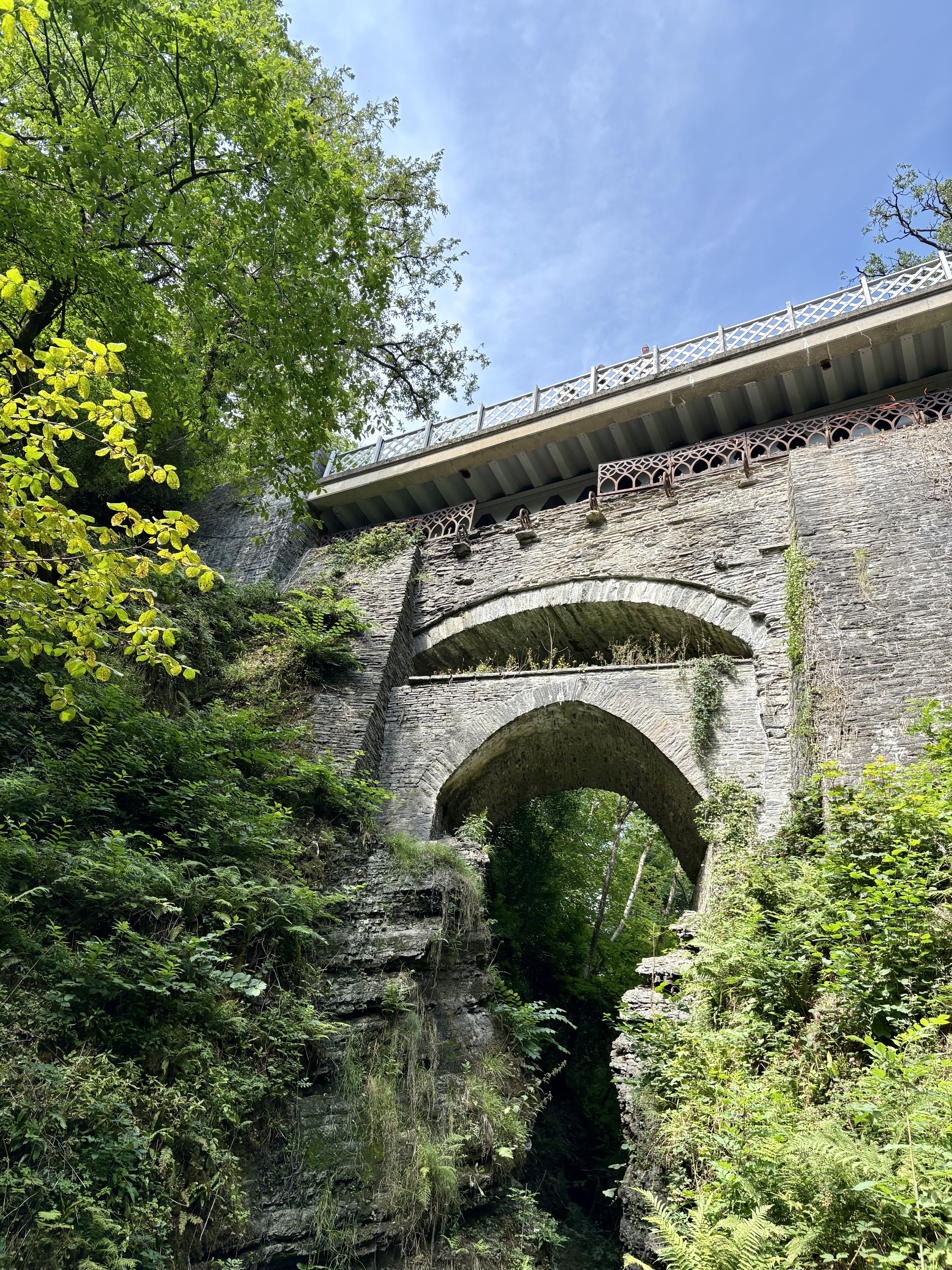
- The three bridges, looking downstream
- Coordinates: 52.3768°N 3.8500°W
- Crosses: Afon Mynach
- Locale: Devil's Bridge, Pontarfynach, Ceredigion, Wales
- Heritage status: Grade II*

Characteristics
- Material: Stone, metal

Statistics

Listed Building – Grade II*
- Official name: Devil's Bridge / Pont ar Fynach
- Designated: 21 January 1964
- Reference no.: 9870

Location
- Interactive map of Devil's Bridge

The Devil's Bridge (Welsh: Pont ar Fynach) is a Grade II* listed bridge spanning Afon Mynach, to the edge of the village of Devil's Bridge (named after the bridge), in Ceredigion, Wales. It is a unique structure, comprising three co-existing separate bridges built on top of one another. They date from different periods, with each new bridge built on top of the older one.

The oldest and lowest bridge of the three dates to possibly either the medieval period or the 16th century. The second bridge was constructed in 1753, and the newest bridge on top was constructed in 1901.

== Description of the three bridges ==
Devil's Bridge comprises three bridges that span Afon Mynach, a tributary of the Rheidol, to the east side of the village of Devil's Bridge. The bridge is unique in that three separate bridges are co-existent, each one built upon the previous bridge, with the previous structures not being demolished. The bridge carries the A4120 road over a gorge of Afon Mynach.

=== Oldest and lowest bridge ===
The oldest and lowest of the three bridges is of an uncertain date, possibly medieval or 16th century in origin. This lowest bridge of rubble stone has a single obtusely pointed arch standing 100 feet (30 m) above the river level, and with stone voussoirs. It was later repaired or rebuilt in the mid 18th century for likely refacing, with it described in 1777 as "a few years since in a very ruinous state", indicating it may have been repaired following the construction of the 1753 bridge above it, possibly to help support it. It was said to have a span of merely 20 feet (6 m) in 1777. In 1895, the old bridge was described as being cracked through its middle by frost, and a part of its southern side had fallen.

=== 18th century centre bridge ===
On top of the oldest bridge lies the arch of another bridge dating to 1753, which was built closely above the old one below, and raised the road level. It is also of rubble stone, though with an arch ring and deep masonry above. The 1753 bridge has a single ~60-foot (18-metre) segmental arch made of large squared stone courses and stone voussoirs at its ends. B. H. Malkin stated this second bridge was wider than the first. Thomas Johnes of Hafod changed the parapets and added cast-iron railings from Aberdare in 1814. In 1824, the arch was said to have been broken due to traffic, and underwent a repair in 1825.

=== 20th century top bridge ===
The newest and highest bridge dates to 1901, and being a metal structure built across the 1753 bridge. It was built by Cardiganshire County Council, who had rejected suggestions for the structure to have more "embellishments" that would increase its attractiveness. The county's surveyor, Roderick Lloyd designed the 1901 bridge, with it being made by Rees & Kirby of Morriston. Originally this metal bridge had iron or steel girders, but were replaced with a flat late 20th century concrete roadway on top of a decking of corrugated steel on two steel deep I-beams. Although the 1901 iron lattice railings were retained.

== History and legend ==
The river has been bridged since at least the 12th century, with a wooden bridge built c. 1075–1200. According to legend, it was built after an old woman lost her cow and saw it grazing on the other side of the river. The Devil appeared and agreed to build a bridge in return for the soul of the first living thing to cross it. When the bridge was finished, the old woman threw a crust of bread over the river, which her dog crossed the bridge to retrieve, thus becoming the first living thing to cross it. The devil was left with only the soul of the dog.

The lowest arch of the current bridge is possibly medieval, or dating to the 16th century. It is a stone arch, and the oldest part of the structure that is still standing. In 1753, the bridge was repaired, and a second stone arch was added when the original bridge was thought to be unstable. The builders used the original bridge to support scaffolding during construction and added a second arch. In 1901, an iron bridge was erected above the older arches, and eliminated the slope in the roadway. In 1971, the steelwork and railings were repaired and the bridge was strengthened.

The bridge is at a point where Afon Mynach drops 90 metres (300 ft) in five steps down a steep and narrow ravine before it meets Afon Rheidol. The set of stone steps, known as Jacob's Ladder, a circular walk for tourists, leads down to a modern metal bridge below the waterfalls.

== See also ==
- Devil's Bridge for other bridges of the same name
- List of bridges in Wales
