= Saint Egwad =

7th century Welsh bishop

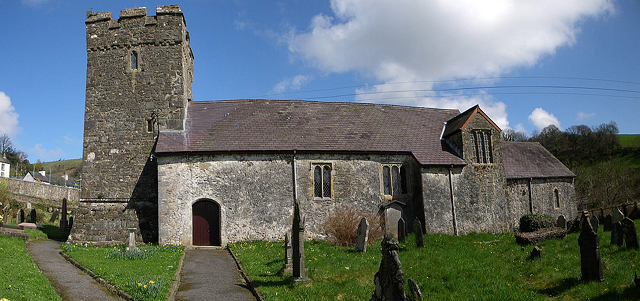
St Egwad's Church, Llanfynydd

Saint Egwad was a 7th-century bishop and Saint of Wales.

He built a church at Ystrad Tywi. He is the Patron Saint of Llanegwad, Wales, and in the Middle Ages there was a festival at this town, in his honour. He is also commemorated in the church at Llanfynydd, Carmarthenshire.
