= Llandeilo Bridge =

Bridge in Llandeilo, west Wales

Coordinates: 51.8796°N 3.9953°W

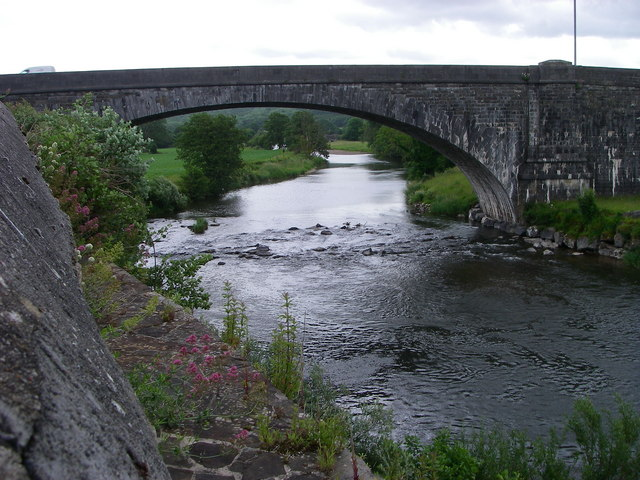
Llandeilo Bridge

Llandeilo Bridge (Welsh: Pont Llandeilo) is a Grade II* listed road bridge crossing the River Towy in Llandeilo, Carmarthenshire, Wales. It carries the main A483 road towards Ffairfach.

== History and description ==
The single-arch bridge was designed by Llandeilo's William Williams, the county bridge surveyor, and built between 1843 and 1848. It replaced a previous three-arched bridge over the river that had, in turn, replaced the medieval seven-arch bridge which had collapsed in 1795. The construction logistics defeated Williams' builder, Morgan Morgan, who was sacked after the entire budget of £6000 was spent building the difficult foundations. Williams died before the bridge was completed and, in 1846, Edward Haycock took over the project. It eventually cost a massive £23,000.

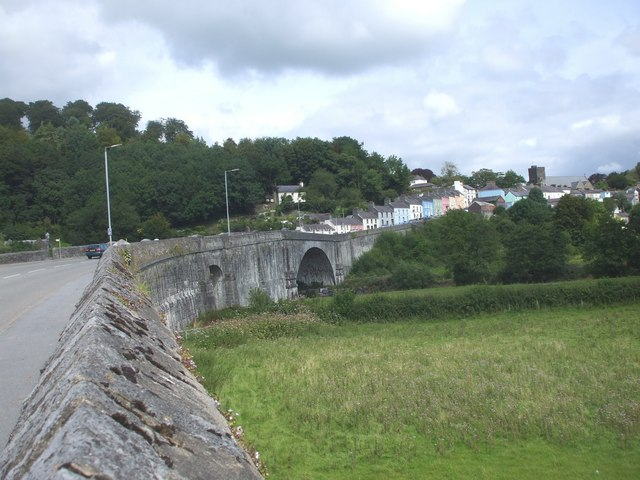
Causeway approach from the south

The earlier bridge had been criticised as not even wide enough for a horse and cart, therefore the new bridge was wide enough for a double carriageway. A single arch spanned 143 ft (43m) across the river, rising 35 ft (10.5m) above it (at the time it was the third longest single arch in Britain). The height of the bridge essentially reduced the gradient of the road towards the town. The bridge, arch soffits, parapets and buttresses are faced with chisel- or hammer-dressed masonry, while the voussoirs of the arch are lengthy and finished with ashlar. Large stone buttresses marked each end of the arch, and similar buttresses continued in either direction from the bridge supporting the long causeways towards Llandeilo and Ffairfach.

The bridge became Grade II* listed in 1966.

== See also ==
- List of bridges in Wales
