= Dafydd Gorlech =

Welsh poet

Dafydd Gorlech (c. 1410 – c. 1490) was a Welsh language poet.

LIttle information about him survives, except for the evidence in his poems. His name suggests a connection with Abergorlech, a former parish in Caeo commote in the Cantref Mawr, Ystrad Tywi.

His poetry dates from around 1446 to around 1490. Only seven Cywydds of his work survive, including a darogan to Sir Rhosier Fychan, an influential Yorkist from Tretower.

His poetry is skilled. The two poems "Ymddiddan rhwng y bardd a'r Wyddfa" and "Cywydd y Gigfran" are two of the best examples of the darogan.

Dafydd's poetry is characterised by prophetic themes. His other surviving work suggests that he was captured alongside Sir Roger Vaughan by Jasper Tudor. Sir Roger was executed whereas Dafydd survived.
