= Pont-y-gwaith =

Coordinates: 51.6695°N 3.3314°W

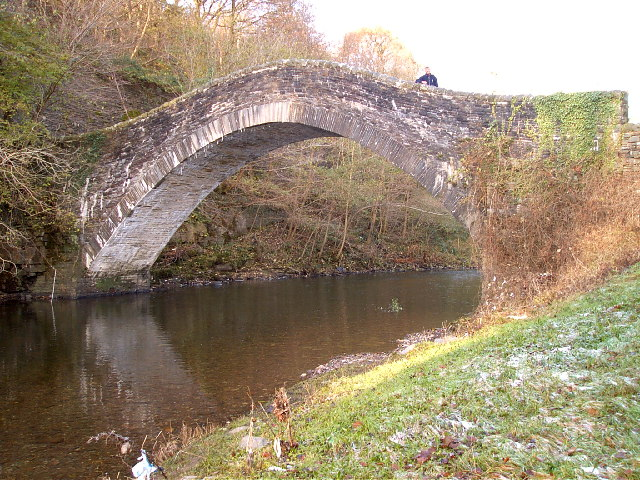
The bridge at Pontygwaith

Pont-y-gwaith (Welsh, "Bridge to work" or "Bridge of the Ironworks") is a historical bridge over the River Taff near Edwardsville, Merthyr Tydfil, Wales.

Pont-y-gwaith was constructed in 1811 to replace the wooden bridge associated with the nearby 16th century ironworks. The bridge was repaired in 1993 by Mid Glamorgan County Council and awarded a commendation by the civic trust. This historical bridge is now a Taff Trail heritage site.

== See also ==
- List of bridges in Wales
