= Rhydarwen =

Listed house in Wales

General information
- Location: Llanarthne, Carmarthenshire, Wales
- Coordinates: 51.85516°N 4.094039°W

Listed Building – Grade II*
- Official name: Rhydarwen (also known as Rhyd-owen).
- Designated: 13 December 1971
- Reference no.: 9417

Rhydarwen, also known as Rhyderwen or Rhyd Owen, is a grade II* listed building in Llanarthne, Carmarthenshire, which has a historical association with Sir Rhys ap Thomas.

== Description ==
Rhydarwen is a grade II* listed farmstead with mediaeval origins, and is an extremely rare surviving example of mediaeval domestic architecture. It is located in the community of Llanarthne, 2.5 km (1.6 mi) east of Llanarthne village, in the centre of Allt Pant Mawr, south of the Tywi near an ancient crossing over the river. Its name refers to the use of the crossing by Owain Glyndŵr: Rhyd Owen (transl. Owen's Ford).

The house is constructed from sandstone and has an irregular form with a slate roof and sash windows with glazing bars. There is a stair turret at each end of the house. The farm buildings are mostly from the 19th century, but some have Georgian features. There are 3 acres of woodland and 6 acres of parkland with a lake, which is home to several species of odonata, as well as Southern Marsh-orchid.

The house features 16th-century tapestry painting, lost in places due to the addition of the 18th-century staircase, as well as replastering, featuring red and black alternating decorated panels. It also contains woodcarvings, including on timber doorheads, dating to the 16th century and displaying the arms of Rhys ap Thomas.

== History ==
The house was built in roughly three phases: two mediaeval sections, as well as a 16th-century addition. The northeast part of the house is the oldest, dating to the early 14th century, and still features the original windows in a large two-storey bay. It was extended to the south in the 15th century. In c. 1500, Rhys ap Thomas extended the house to the west with an additional hall and two-storey bay.

Following Rhys ap Thomas, the property was owned by his descendants. In the 16th century, it was occupied by Harry ap Sion; in 1595, by his grandson Griffith Vaughan; in 1703, by Richard Price; in 1806, by his descendant; and then by Rev T. B. Gwyn.

The house was altered in the 18th century, including the addition of a wood porch and a staircase. The house was also extended to the east in recent years.

It was designated grade II* listed in 1971.
