= St Ystyffan's Church =

Church in Llansteffan, Carmarthenshire, Wales

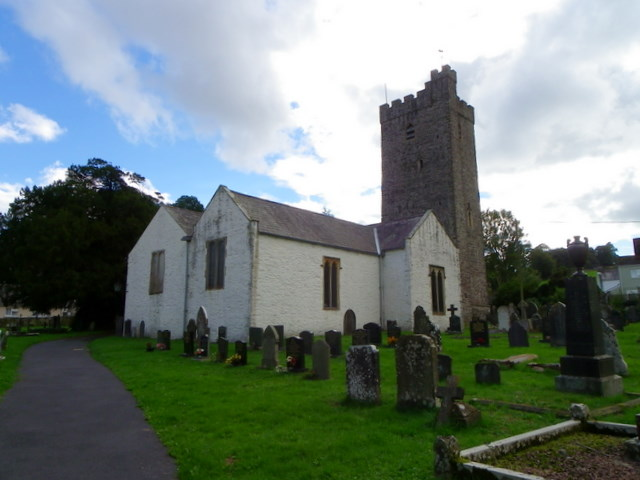
- Church of St Ystyffan, Llansteffan in 2010

Religion
- Affiliation: Anglicanism

Location
- Location: Llansteffan, Carmarthenshire, Wales
- Location in Llansteffan
- Coordinates: 51.770665°N 4.392645°W

Listed Building – Grade II*
- Official name: Church of St Ystyffan
- Designated: 30 November 1966
- Reference no.: 9404

The Church of St Ystyffan (or the Church of St Stephen) is a grade-II*-listed church in Llansteffan, Carmarthenshire, Wales.

== History ==
This first church at the site was built in c. 650, possibly by Saint Ystyffan, who may have also been known as Saint Teilo. It was rebuilt in stone by the Norman invaders, who also built Llansteffan Castle, in c. 1112, changing the dedication to St Stephen.

In c. 1170, Geoffrey Marmion granted the church, as well as the fisheries and ferry across the Taf, to the Order Of St John at Slebech. This grant was confirmed in 1231–1247, and, in 1290, Bishop Bek of St Davids regranted the church to the Prior of the Knights Hospitaller in England, which was confirmed in 1328.

The church was enlarged in the 14th century.

After the dissolution of the monastries, the church and its advowson belonged to the Crown, but it was owned privately by 1833.

By 1710, the chapel in the north transept was roofless and in danger of falling down.

The church began to be renovated in 1829–1830, with further repairs in the 1860s. The church was extensively renovated in 1872, with a tablet commemorating the work unveiled in 1874. More renovations were carried out in 1884–1885.

In 1887, a 2-manual organ by Wedlake of London was donated to the church.

== Building ==
St Ystyffan's Church is on the southwest corner of Church Street and High Street in the village of Llansteffan. It is a medieval parish church, with 19th-century restorations and stained glass windows from the late 19th century to the late 20th century. It features Norman-era pointed arches, lancet windows, and a tower. It combines Norman architecture and the Gothic architectural style.

The church was listed in 1966; it was designated as grade II in 1998 and upgraded to grade II* in 2021.

The tower at St Ystyffan's Church in 2009

The building is made of limestone rubble and retains 80% of its medieval core fabric. Originally, it consisted of a Romanesque nave, about 17.5 x 5.7 meters in size. The nave was built in the 12th or 13th century, the transepts in the mid- to late-15th century, and a porch in c. 1550. A chapel was built in the north transept in c. 1700, which now houses the original medieval font from the 12th century that was replicated in 1869. The tower was added at the turn of the 15th and 16th centuries.

Porch of Church of St Ystyffan in 2015

The building was renovated in the 19th century. In 1829, the windows were enlarged, and a new oak pulpit and reredos installed. In 1844, a roof was replaced and a gallery was added, which has since been removed. In 1869, a new font was bought for the church made from freestone. In 1872, the arch between the nave and tower was blocked, the traditional box pews were replaced, and two new windows were added to the transepts. A boilerhouse was also inserted beneath the porch. In 1887, a clock was added to the tower. In 1894, the tower required repairs.

Further renovations were performed in the 1920s, particularly to the tower. Between 1995 and 1997, the roof slates were replaced, and the tower was re-pointed.

=== Stained glass windows ===
The church features a number of stained glass windows, including one of The Good Samaritan, dated 1881, made by John Hardman & Co.; one of Saint Stephen, dated 1957, made by G. Maile & Son; and newer stained glass windows made by John Petts installed in 1974, 1980, and 1982.

=== Bells ===
In 1552, there were three bells, but only one in 1672. In 1875, 8 bells by Mears and Stainbank were donated to the church, which were restored for the millennium. The bells are regularly rung by local and visiting bell ringers.

=== Churchyard ===
Graves in the churchyard at St Ysyffan's Church in 2015

The churchyard is lined with old gravestones, and three-cornered garlic grows there. To the north-east of the churchyard, there used to be an animal pound.

== Worship ==
The church is part of the Benefice of Llanllwch with Llangain, Llangynog, and Llansteffan with Llanybri and Llandeilo Abercywyn. It didn't have a vicar for a long time but now has a priest in charge, assisted by a curate and a trainee priest. The church is generally open to visitors during the daytime. Morning Prayer is held on the 1st and 3rd Sundays of the month; Holy Eucharist is held on the 2nd and 4th, and sometimes on the 5th, Sunday of the month.

== See also ==
- Architecture of Wales
- Christianity in Wales
- Grade II* listed buildings in Carmarthenshire
- List of Anglican churches
