= St Julians railway bridge =

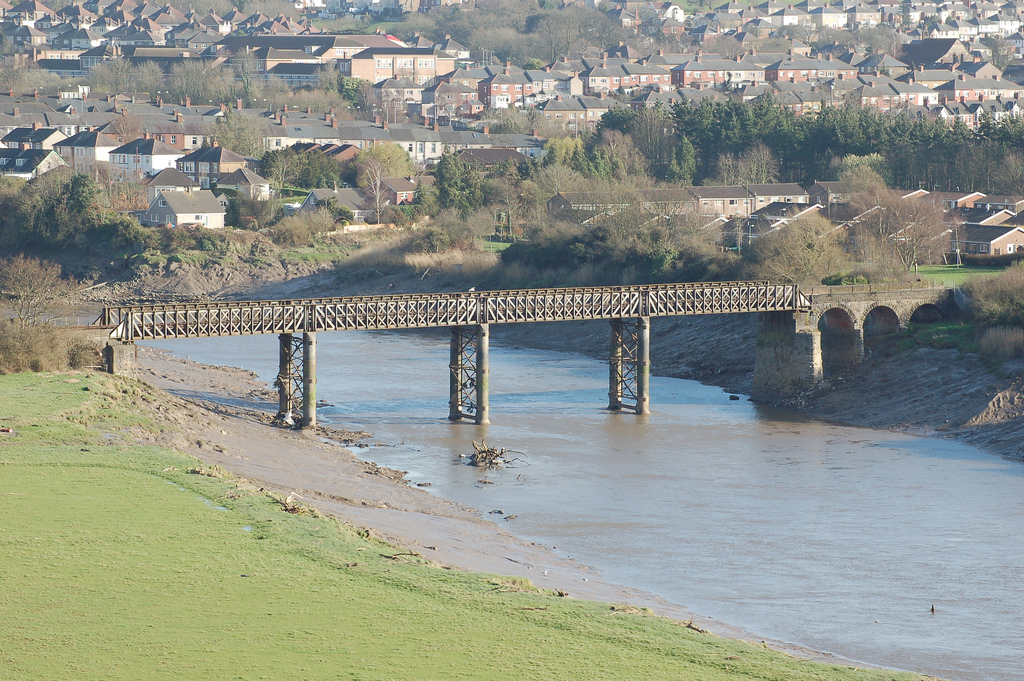
- View of the bridge looking south
- Coordinates: 51°36′23″N 2°58′55″W
- Carries: Railway
- Crosses: River Usk
- Locale: Newport
- Maintained by: Network Rail

Characteristics
- Width: Double standard-gauge (4 foot 8½ inch) track

Location
- Interactive map of St Julians railway bridge

The St Julians railway bridge is a crossing of the River Usk close to the city of Newport, South Wales. It carries the Welsh Marches Line across the river in a north–south direction. Due to the meanderings of the river, all the other crossings are east–west.

The bridge was opened to traffic during 1874 by the Pontypool, Caerleon and Newport Railway. Consisting of four brick-built arches and four wrought iron lattice truss spans with wrought iron cross girders and plate floors, the structure carries a pair of railway lines across the river. In the 1960s, the bridge was refurbished and strengthened; during the early 2010s, the viaduct was again subject to structural repairs and remedial works.

== History ==
The origins of the St Julians railway bridge are closely associated with that of the Pontypool, Caerleon and Newport Railway, for which the structure was built. Its construction was necessary for the line to traverse the River Usk. The bridge was completed during 1874.

The viaduct has been subject to remedial works several times throughout its lifespan. During the 1960s, a major strengthening scheme was conducted under the auspices of the nationalised railway operator British Rail. By the early 2010s, detailed surveys of the bridge had determined that the ageing structure was once again in need of strengthening; thus, the national rail infrastructure owner Network Rail appointed Balfour Beatty as the prime contractor for planning and overseeing these works. During a six-month period in 2014, the bridge was subject to significant repairs to its steelwork and masonry, including the installation of additional bracing to strengthen the main deck; a major aim of these works was to increase the bridge's capacity wherever it was reasonable to do so. Throughout the project, efforts were made to minimise any impact on the passage of river traffic.
