= Pont Llandeilo-yr-ynys =

Listed bridge over the River Towy in Wales

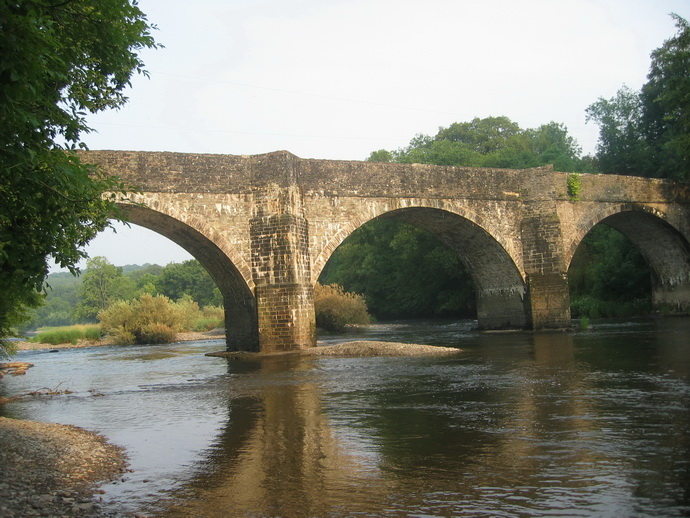
- Llandeilo-Yr-Ynys Bridge
- Coordinates: 51°51′39″N 4°11′23″W
- Crosses: River Towy
- Other name(s): Pont Llandeilo'r-ynys, Pont Llandeilo Rwnws, Rhynnws Bridge, Pont-newydd, Newbridge
- Next upstream: Pont-y-Dryslwyn (B4297)
- Next downstream: Carmarthen Bypass Bridge (A40)

Characteristics
- Width: 3.6 m (12 ft)
- Longest span: 45 ft or 15 m
- No. of spans: 3

History
- Designer: William Edwards and sons
- Construction end: 1787

Statistics

Listed Building – Grade II*
- Official name: Pont Llandeilo-yr-ynys (partly in Llanegwad Community)
- Designated: 30 November 1966
- Reference no.: 9391

Listed Building – Grade II*
- Official name: Pont Llandeilo-yr-ynys (partly in Llanarthney Community)
- Designated: 8 July 1966
- Reference no.: 10921

Location
- Interactive map of Pont Llandeilo-yr-ynys

Pont Llandeilo-yr-ynys is a grade-II*-listed bridge across the Afon Tywi (River Towy) in Carmarthenshire carrying the B4310 between Nantgaredig and Llanarthney. It was designed by William Edwards and built in 1787. The high fees charged for crossing the bridge in the early 19th century were one of the complaints of protesters during the Rebecca Riots.

== Location ==
The bridge is located partly in the community of Llanegwad, and partly in the community of Llanarthney. It is approximately 1.4 km south of Nantgaredig, and 8 km east of Carmarthen. The bridge crosses the Afon Tywi (River Towy) just below its confluence with the Afon Cothi (River Cothy). It carries the B4310 road across the river.

== Names ==
The bridge has various name variants in both English and Welsh.

Pont Llandeilo-yr-ynys, Pont Llandeilo'r-ynys and Llandeilo-yr-ynys Bridge refer to the nearby hamlet called Llandeilo-yr-ynys. Its name refers to a small eyot in the river immediately to the east of the bridge.

Pont Llandeilo Rwnws and Rhynnws Bridge refer to the trust that built the bridge.

The bridge is also known as Pont-newydd or Newbridge.

The use of Llandeilo in the names, also historically spelled as Llandilo, comes from the claim that Saint Teilo was born in Llandeilo-yr-ynys in the 6th century.

== History ==
The crossing has medieval origins.

The first bridge at Llandilo-rhwnws was built in 1779, but fell in 1781.

Its replacement was designed by William Edwards, who designed many South Wales bridges, including the Pontypridd Bridge, or by his son David. It was built for the Llandilo Rwnws Bridge Trust, which was established in 1784, to replace a ford across the river used by the Llanddarog lime and limestone traffic. The bridge cost £1,200 and was completed in 1787.

=== Rebecca Riots ===
The bridge had a gate and tollhouse on the southern side. The high tolls collected by the Three Commotts Turnpike Trust, which owned the bridge in the early 19th century, were one of the complaints of the farmers during the Rebecca Riots. On 7 July 1843, the Llandilo-rwnnws toll-gate attached to the bridge was attacked by around 100 rioters and destroyed. After the South Wales Turnpike Trusts Act 1844, the bridge was operated by the County Roads Board.

=== Floods ===
On 4/5 November 1931, serious floods caused by abnormal rainfall damaged one of the piers and the two arches resting on it, leading to a partial collapse. The bridge had to be closed. It was underpinned and restored to its former appearance at a cost of £4,791.The bridge also suffered serious flood damage in 1933, and had to be restored.

== Design ==
It consists of three equal 45 ft or 15 m spans made from limestone, each with a semi-circular arch separated by cutwater buttresses. It has a carriageway 3.66 metres (12.0 ft) wide, with pedestrian refuges above its buttresses.

The bridge was designated as grade II* on 8 July 1966 for the community of Llanegwad, and on 30 November 1966 for the community of Llanarthney.
