= Afon Cothi =

River in Carmarthenshire, Wales

Coordinates: 51°52′N 4°11′W

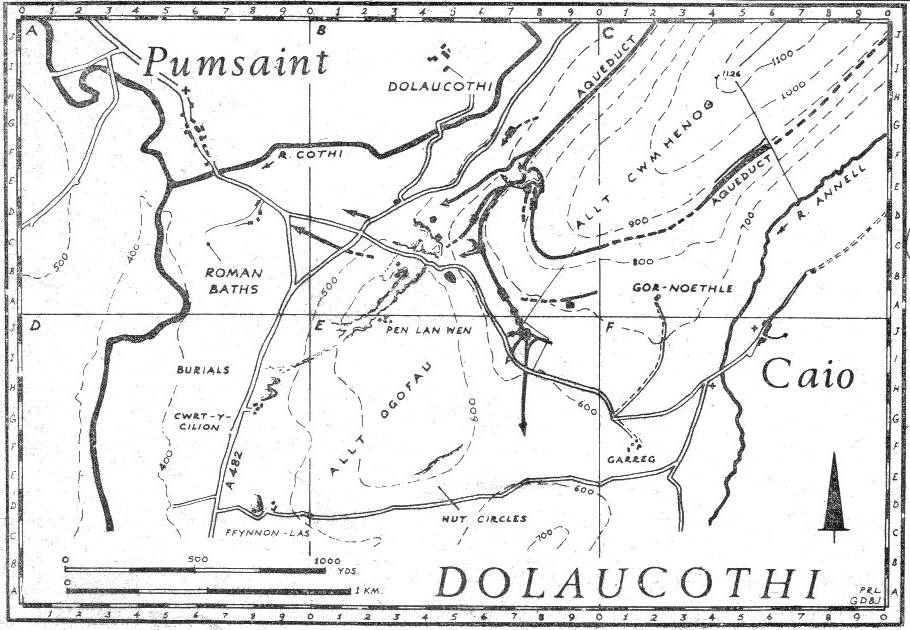
Map of the gold mine

Afon Cothi, also known as the River Cothy or River Cothi, is the largest tributary of the River Towy, located in Carmarthenshire, Wales. From its source at Blaen Cothi in the north of the county, north of Pumsaint, it flows south-east and then turns south-west to flow past Cwrt-y-cadno, Pumsaint, Abergorlech and Pont-ar-Gothi before joining the River Towy west of the village of Llanarthney.

The Cothi is noted for its trout and sea trout (sewin) fishing and for its scenery.
