= Newcastle Emlyn Bridge =

Listed bridge in Newcastle Emlyn, Wales

The Bridge Pont Castell Newydd Emlyn
- Bridge over the River Teifi in 2008
- Coordinates: 52.04029°N 4.466754°W
- Carries: A475
- Crosses: Afon Teifi
- Locale: Newcastle Emlyn
- Other name(s): Newcastle Emlyn Bridge; Teifi Bridge
- Heritage status: Listed building Scheduled monument

Characteristics
- Width: 4.5 m (15 ft) – 5 m (16 ft)

History
- Built: 18th century

Statistics

Listed Building – Grade II*
- Official name: Newcastle Emlyn Bridge (Partly in Newcastle Emlyn community)
- Designated: 21 September 1964
- Reference no.: 9880

Listed Building – Grade II*
- Official name: The Bridge
- Designated: 21 September 1964
- Reference no.: 9686

Scheduled monument
- Official name: Newcastle Emlyn Bridge
- Reference no.: CM087

Location
- Interactive map of The Bridge

The Bridge (also known as Newcastle Emlyn Bridge or Teifi Bridge; Welsh: Pont Castell Newydd Emlyn) is a bridge over the Afon Teifi in Newcastle Emlyn. It is a grade II* listed building and a scheduled monument.

== Description ==
The bridge links Newcastle Emlyn to the neighbouring village of Adpar across the River Teifi. It is partly in the community of Llandyfriog and partly in the Newcastle Emlyn community, spanning the former county boundary between Carmarthenshire and Ceredigion.

The bridge is built from rubble stone. It has 3 elliptical arches, and the central arch is higher and broader. The east side has full-height cutwaters, but those on the west side were covered when the bridge was widened. It was originally around 3 m (9.8 ft) wide and was widened by 1.5 m (4 ft 11 in) to 2 m (6 ft 7 in).

View of the Teifi from the top of a cutwater in 2008

An arch of the Bridge in 2024

The Bridge and its parallel footbridge in 2019

It was designated as grade II* in 1964. The bridge is also a scheduled monument due to its potential to contain evidence of medieval or post-medieval construction techniques and transportation systems.

== History ==
The date that Newcastle Emlyn Bridge was built is uncertain. It probably dates to the 18th century but may include some earlier work from the medieval or post-medieval period. It was widened in the 19th century. It is illustrated on a map from 1773 held in the Carmarthenshire Records Office.

In June 1843, the 4th Light Dragoons were sent to Newcastle Emlyn during the Rebecca Riots. It was reported that the rioters and soldiers fought on the Bridge, and soldiers were injured and thrown from it, with a soldier named Kearns dying in the river. However, no demonstration happened in Newcastle Emlyn while the dragoons were present, although the tollhouse Newcastle Emlyn Gate was destroyed the following day.

The bridge was being repaired when it was surveyed in January 1990.

Newcastle Emlyn Bridge was closed due to flooding in 2018.
