= 51 King Street, Carmarthen =

Listed building in South Wales

51 King Street
- 51 Heol y Brenin
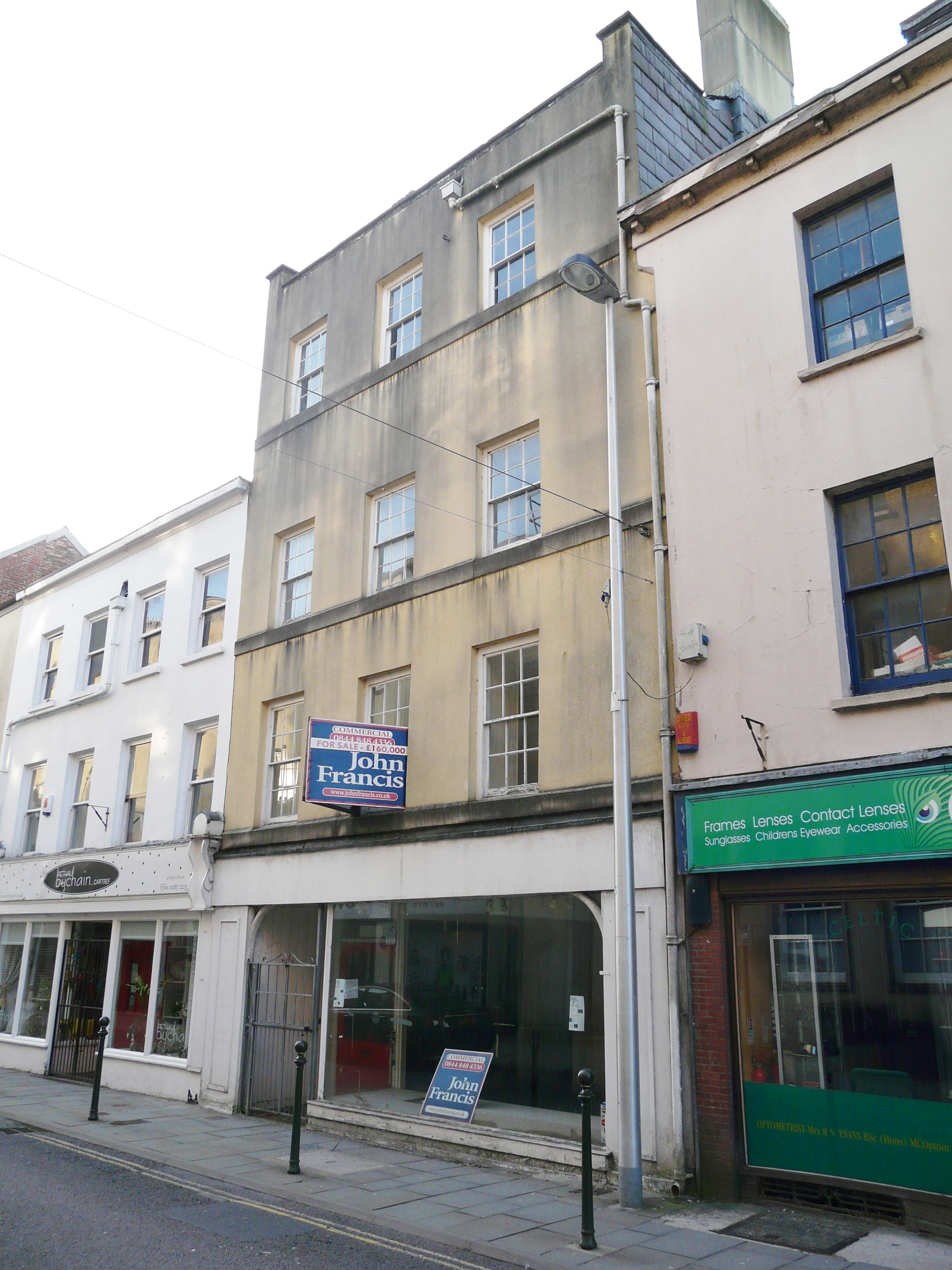
- 51 King Street, Carmarthen in 2014
- Alternative names: 51 Stryd y Brenin

General information
- Location: Carmarthen, Wales, United Kingdom
- Coordinates: 51.856974°N 4.305251°W

Listed Building – Grade II*
- Official name: No 51 including near-detached rear wing
- Designated: 19 May 1981
- Reference no.: 9471

51 King Street is a grade-II*-listed town house in Carmarthen, South Wales. It was built in the 18th century and housed a Mayor of Carmarthen and surgeon in the late 19th century. It was then converted into a bicycle shop and later used as a café and a shop.

== History ==
51 King Street was likely built in the early- or mid-18th century, with its top floor added in the 19th century. The near-detached building to its rear may have been built earlier, in the late 17th century.

=== 19th Century ===
From 1875, James Rowlands, F.R.C.S, lived at 51 King Street. He was the Mayor of Carmarthen in 1857 and a general surgeon for Carmarthen Infirmary and the prison, as well as coroner for the Three Commotts District of Carmarthenshire, working in Carmarthen for forty years. He was a town councillor for fifty years, as well as an alderman. He retired due to illness and died six months later at 51 King Street on 10 April 1899. His sons James David Rowlands and Daniel George Rowlands were also registered as surgeons at the same address. His wife, Anne, died on 17 December 1899 at 51 King Street, and her probate will is in the National Library of Wales.

At the end of the 19th century, the Carmarthenshire Blind Relief Society was administered by Elizabeth Brown at 51 King Street, Carmarthen.

=== 20th Century ===
The house was sold in February 1900 from the estate of James Rowlands to Mr. Bradbury Jones, cycle manufacturer, for £1,110 to use as new premises for the cycle company D. E. Jones & Co., "Leader" Cycle Works. They already had premises on the same street, at 61 King Street, and a branch in Tenby. In March 1900, builders made extensive alterations to the property, adding a new shopfront, designed by local architect George Morgan. Once opened, the cycle shop displayed over 300 bicycles and motor cars. The building operated as a cycle shop during the early 20th century.

The shop was used as a bakery from the 1920s to the later 20th century, with a café in the rear building.

The building, including its near-detached rear wing, was designated grade II* on 19 November 1981.

=== 21st Century ===
In 2002, it was occupied by a fishing tackle shop called The Fishfinder. It later became a fancy-dress shop and, in 2017, opened as a boutique gift shop called Found & Seek.

== Architecture ==
The building is a large, 4-storey townhouse and shop situated opposite the former post office on King Street. The ground-floor shopfront has a shop door to the left of a large glass window. The upper floors have sash windows, which are smaller on the 2 top floors. The near-detached rear wing has 2 storeys and has a large external chimney breast.
