= Llanegwad =

Village and community in Carmarthenshire, Wales

Coordinates: 51.872°N 4.152°W

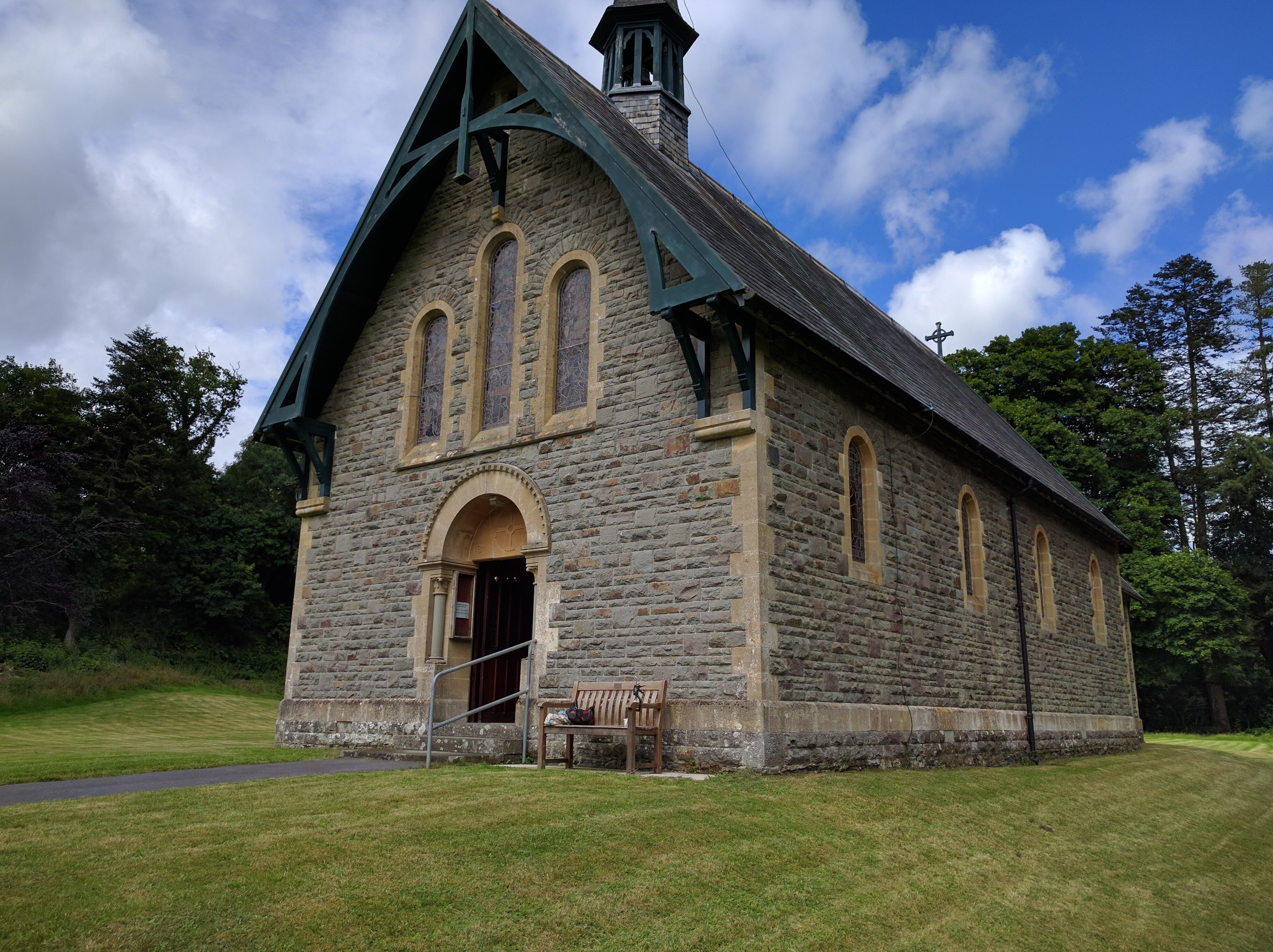
- Holy Trinity Church

- Location within Carmarthenshire
- Population: 1,473 (2011 census)
- Community: Llanegwad
- Principal area: Carmarthenshire
- Country: Wales
- Sovereign state: United Kingdom
- UK Parliament: Caerfyrddin
- List of places UK Wales Carmarthenshire Map of the community

Llanegwad (Welsh pronunciation) is a village and community located in Carmarthenshire, Wales. The population taken at the 2011 census was 1,473.

Llanegwad is built up mainly of small farms and detached homes. The community is bordered by the communities of: Llanfihangel Rhos-y-Corn; Llanfynydd; Llangathen; Llanarthney; Abergwili; and Llanllawddog, all being in Carmarthenshire. Villages include Cwrt Henri, Nantgaredig, and Pontargothi.

== Services ==
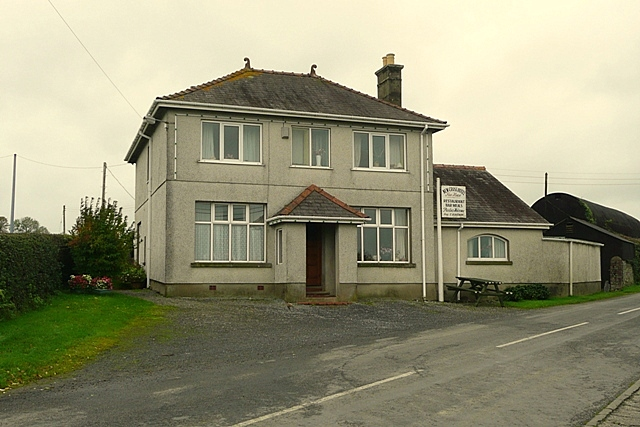
The New Cross Hotel

Most of all homes located in Llanegwad are older Victorian properties, as well as a number of more modern homes. The area has few amenities any more.

The village has lost much of the services it once had, an example being Llanegwad School; formerly "Llanegwad National School" closing down in 1948. The area over the years has also lost its drinking establishments.

== Churches ==
The village “Llanegwad Church" named for Saint Egwad is an historic church as it is the only remaining building on the site where several monasteries and religious cells once existed. The building was begun in the 10th–11th century but restored in the 19th century.

Holy Trinity Church was built in 1865 of local sandstone with a Gothic style bell tower, stained glass windows, wooden barrel vault nave, decorated interior with 25 frescoes. Benjamin Bucknall was the architect.

== Chapels ==
A number of nonconformist chapels are located in the parish of Llanegwad:

- Nantgaredig Chapel - one of the oldest surviving Calvinistic Methodist causes in Carmarthenshire. A key role in its establishment was played by Evan Richard, who faced local opposition to a Methodist cause.
- Pontynyswen - this Calvinistic Methodist chapel is now a private dwelling. In 1961 the chapel was threatened by a proposed reservoir in the valley, and the local MP Lady Megan Lloyd George opposed the scheme in the House of Commons, noting that it would engulf “the small hamlet of Pontynyswen, a chapel and its burial ground.”
- Siloam Independent Chapel, situated in Pont-ar-gothi. The cause here began in 1822, when Independents met in the house of Ty'n-y-coed nearby. In 1824 the first chapel was built, being rebuilt in 1848/1849.
- Horeb Independent Chapel, Felingwm was built between 1830 and 1832. Local tradition has it that before the chapel was built, the preacher would stand on a stone in a nearby quarry, and that the stone was incorporated into the foundations when the chapel was built.

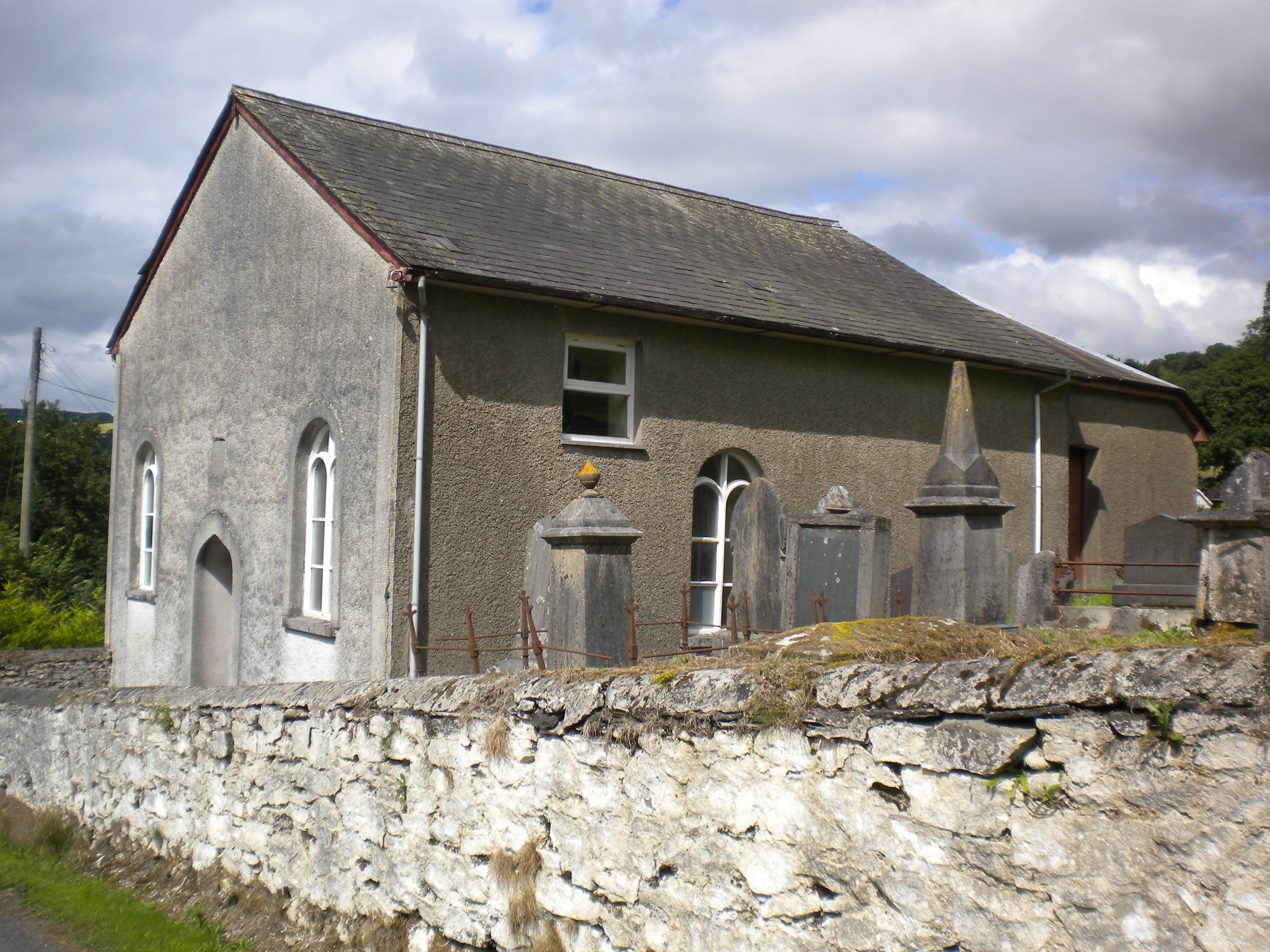
Sittim Baptist Chapel, Felingwm

- Sittim Welsh Baptist chapel was first built in 1817. It was involved in the great revival of 1904-05, and one report from the time describes a large gathering at Sittim on a Tuesday evening with the Holy Spirit manifestly at work among them.
- Zion Wesleyan Methodist chapel near Cwrt Henri was probably founded in about 1806. A register associated with Mynydd-bach or Zion covers the years 1814–1863. Building work on Zion in this period is attested to by the existence of a building-subscription book from 1857 and a building account book for 1858–61.

== Coffee House ==
One of the more notable homes of Llanegwad is Ty Dderwen formerly Coffee House. The home of the Lewis family, the house received the name coffee when the church asked the Lewis family if they would be willing on a Sunday to serve coffee in their front room for the ladies after church. The house later served as a tailoring firm led by the master tailor David Lewis. The house at the same time served as the village post office. The house continued to stay in the same family lived in by David Eric Hart a musician and composer until he sold the house in the 1970s. The house is located next to Llanegwad church.

== Governance ==
An electoral ward with the same name exists. This ward stretches north from Llanegwad and has a total population of 2,440.
