= Pont Cothi =

Listed bridge over the River Cothi in Wales

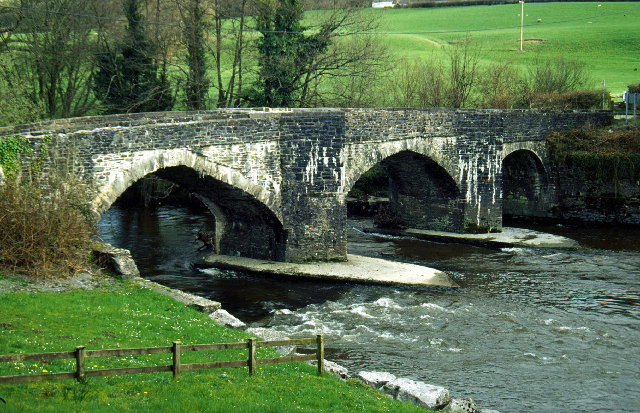
- Pont Cothi in Abergorlech in 2001
- Coordinates: 51.98254°N 4.062231°W
- Crosses: Afon Cothi
- Locale: Abergorlech, Carmarthenshire, Wales

Characteristics
- No. of spans: 3

Statistics

Listed Building – Grade II*
- Official name: Pont Cothi (partly in Llanfynydd Community)
- Designated: 8 July 1966
- Reference no.: 9380

Listed Building – Grade II*
- Official name: Pont Cothi (partly in Llanfihangel Rhos-y-Corn Community(
- Designated: 8 July 1966
- Reference no.: 10928

Location
- Interactive map of Pont Cothi

Pont Cothi (transl. Cothy Bridge) is a grade-II*-listed bridge in Abergorlech carrying a minor road across the Afon Cothi (River Cothy) in Carmarthenshire.

== Location ==
The bridge is located in the centre of Abergorlech, carrying a minor road leading to Llanfynydd immediately south of its junction with the B4310. It spans the Afon Cothi (River Cothy) on the border of the Llanfihangel Rhos-y-Corn and Llanfynydd communities.

== History ==
A wooden bridge over the Cothi existed in Abergorlech in 1675, which was later replaced by the present bridge in the 17th or early 18th century. It was repaired in 1794 by John Jones.

== Design ==
The bridge consists of 3 bays constructed from rubble stone. It carries a single carriageway, which has pedestrian refuges above the cutwaters on its central piers. One refuge has a small stone tablet with the inscription: This bridge was mended by John Jones 1794.

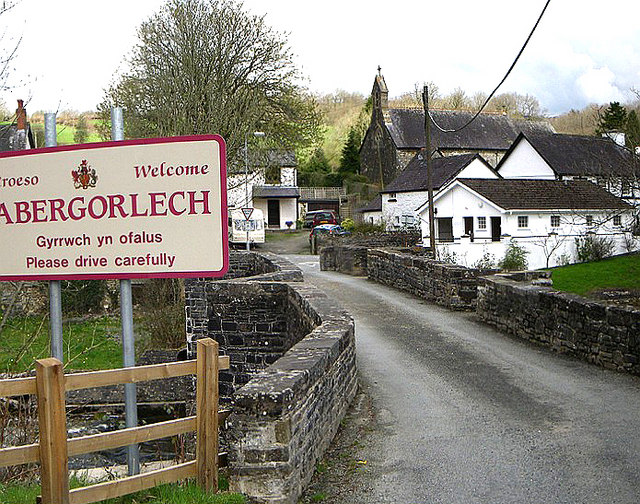
Pont Cothi in 2006

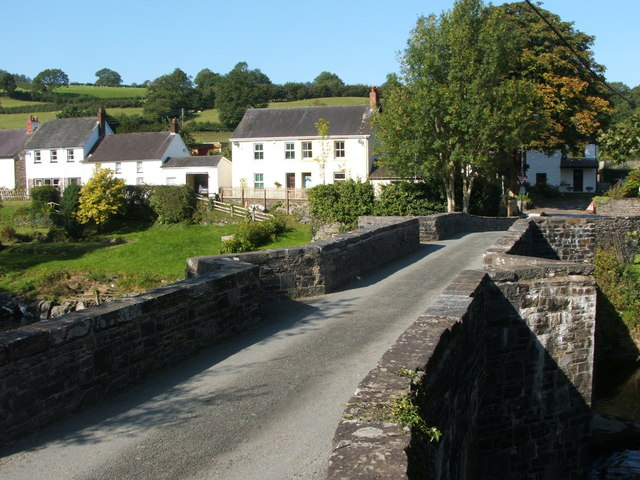
Pont Cothi in 2008

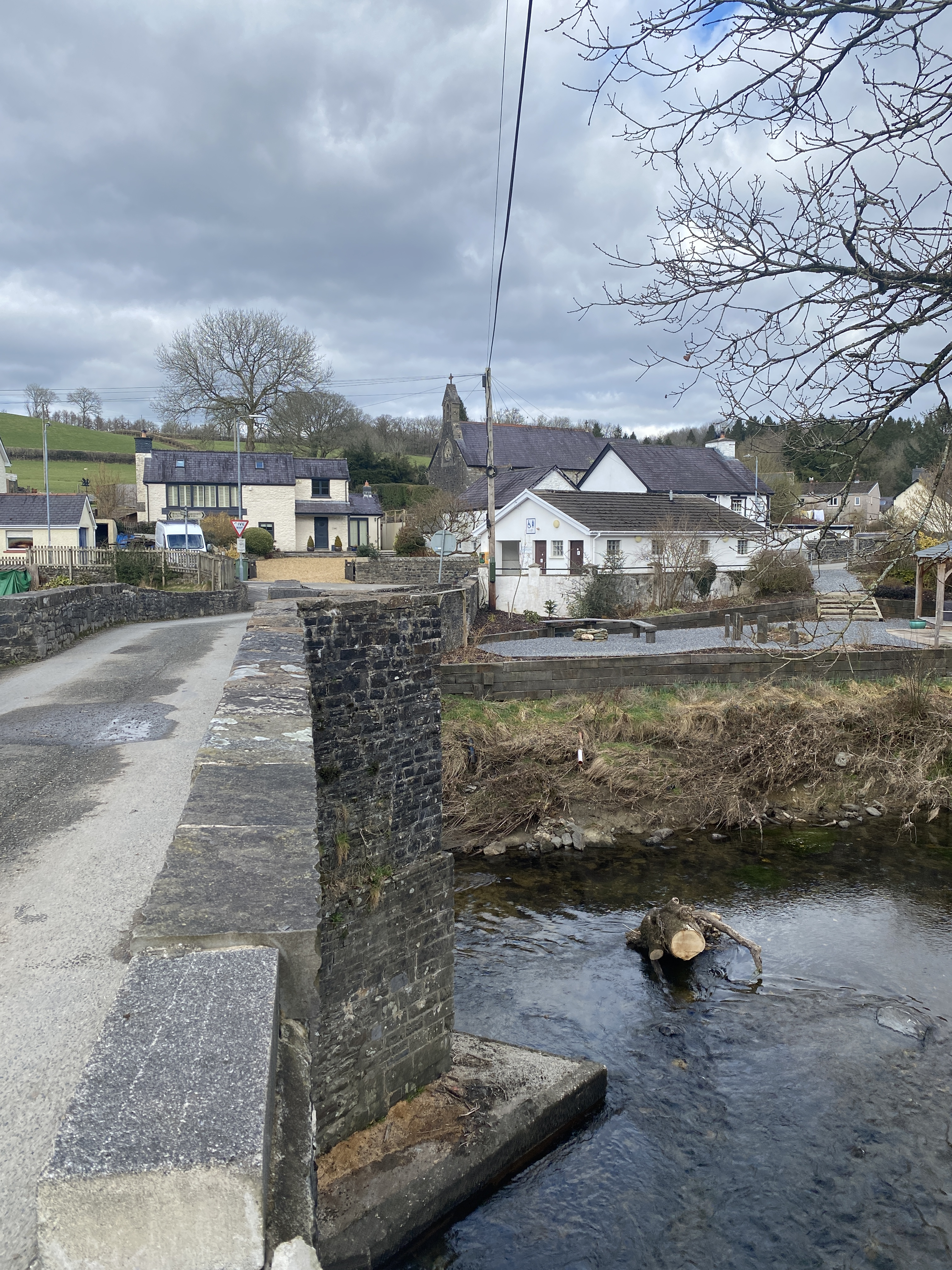
Pont Cothi in 2023

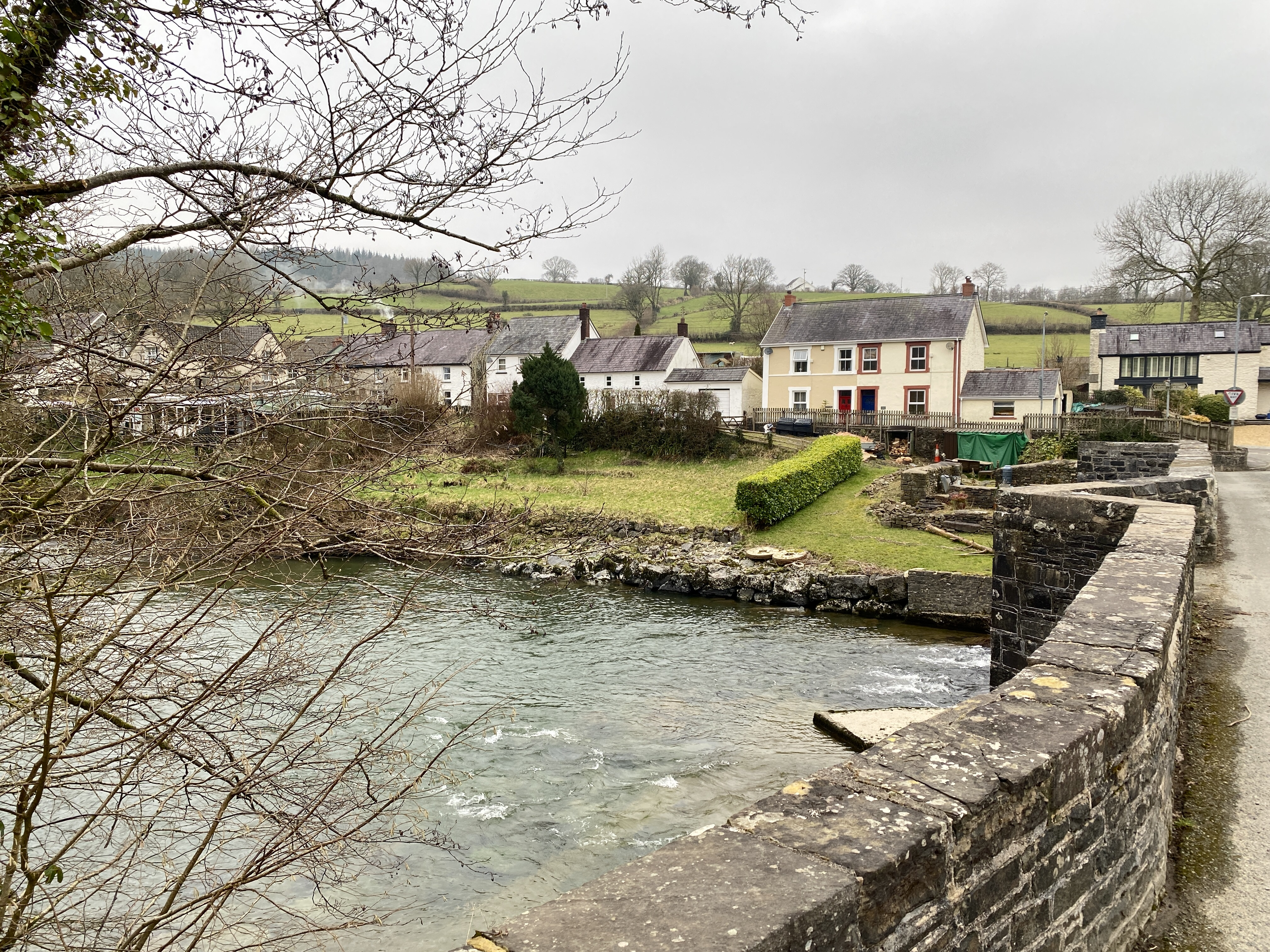
Pont Cothi in 2025

The bridge was designated as grade II* on 8 July 1966.
