= 2 & 3 Quay Street, Carmarthen =

2 & 3 Quay Street
- 2 & 3 Stryd y Cei
- Top: 2 Quay Street in 2018; Bottom: 3 Quay Street in 2018

General information
- Location: 2-3 Quay Street, Carmarthen, SA31 3JT
- Coordinates: 51.8558°N 4.30713°W
- Year built: Early 18th century

Listed Building – Grade II*
- Official name: 2 Quay Street
- Designated: 18 August 1954
- Reference no.: 9556

Listed Building – Grade II
- Official name: 3 Quay Street
- Designated: 18 August 1954
- Reference no.: 82116

2 & 3 Quay Street are a pair of listed buildings on Quay Street in Carmarthen. 2 Quay Street is designated as grade II* and 3 Quay Street is grade II.

== Description ==
Both buildings are early 18th-century terraced houses with painted brick and rough cast render. Brick was a fashionable but uncommon material in West Wales before the late 19th century, so their red brick facing is unusual. They were built as a pair in a style popular in London from the late 17th century to c. 1730. They both have a continuous modillion eaves cornice, dormer windows and hooded doorways. The buildings are marked on the 1834 map of Carmarthen.

2 Quay Street has two storeys and an attic. 3 Quay Street has a basement, two storeys, an attic and a near-detached rear wing.

Quay Street has the most remaining 18th-century houses in Carmarthen. It formed in the early 12th century, and, by the late Middle Ages, it housed Carmarthen's most prominent families.

== History ==
=== 2 Quay Street ===
2 Quay Street in 2018

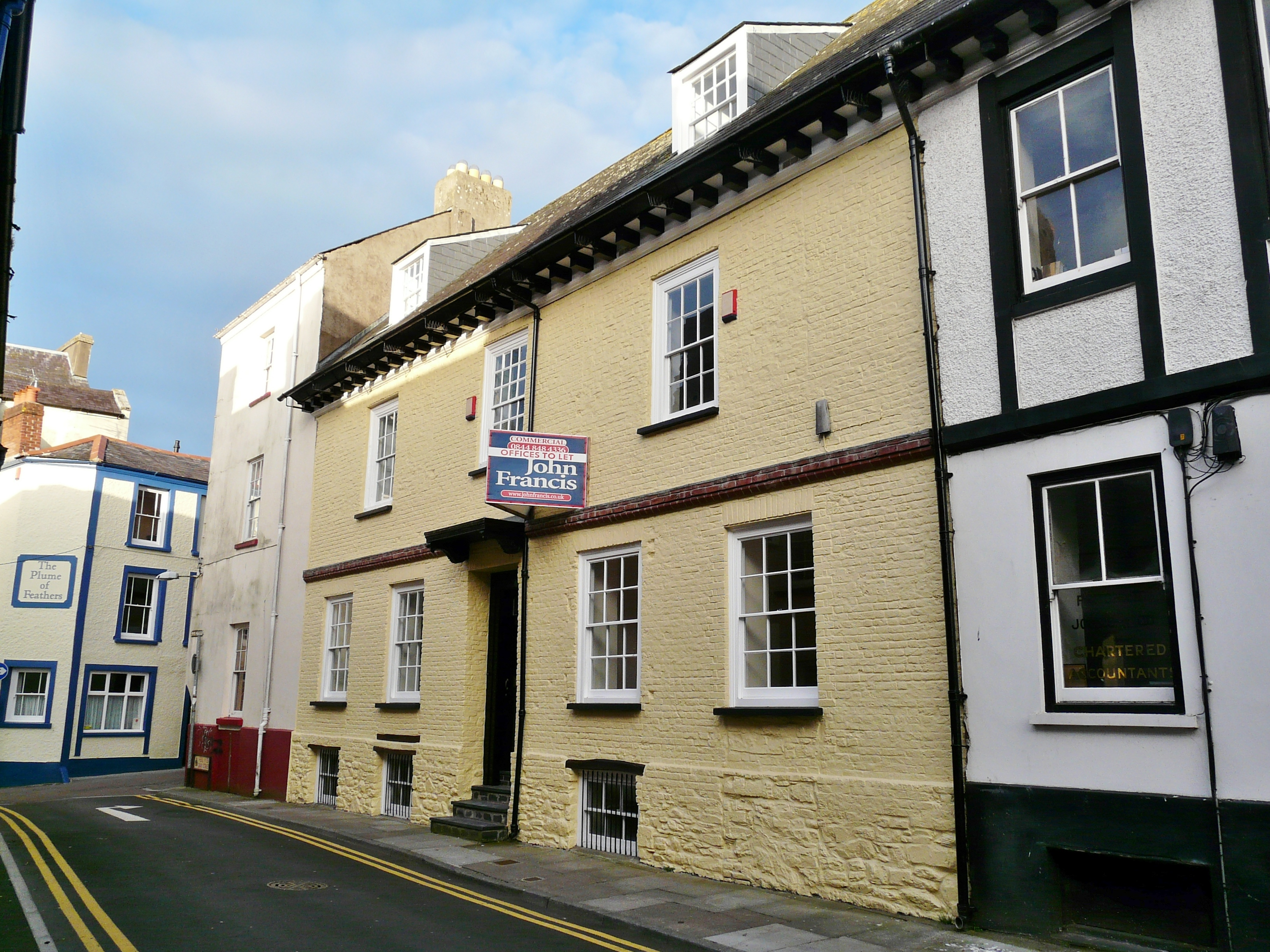
2 Quay Street in 2014

2 Quay Street was built in the early 18th century.

In 1902, the Carmarthenshire branch of the Welsh Industries Association held free basket-making classes at 2 Quay Street with the hopes of establishing a factory in the area.

In 1904, H. Taylor Stephens of 2 Quay Street entered into and then withdrew from a competition with a device consisting of metal fin-shaped plates rivetted or otherwise secured to a tyre to help it grip the road.

On 24 September 1916, Corporal William "Willie" Goater Lloyd, aged 20, who lived at 2 Quay Street, was killed and buried in France after spending 15 months fighting at the front during World War I. He was the first Carmarthen man to join the Welsh Guards and the youngest member to go on active service. He was the nephew of Malter Lloyd, J.P., Carmarthen. A former pupil of the Carmarthen Grammar School, a chorister at Christ Church, a member of the St David's C.L.B., and the drummer of the Carmarthen Troop of Boy Scouts, he enlisted at eighteen and went to France in July 1915. His obituary described him as "one of the most popular boys in Carmarthen". A memorial service was held at Christ Church.

From the late 19th century until the 1930s, 2 Quay Street housed the premises of the tailor D. Beynon Jones, with workrooms to the rear.

It was designated as grade II* in 1954.

In 1970, 2 Quay Street was the premises of chartered auctioneer and estate agent V. King Thomas & Co.

In August 1973, J. Ll. Williams, a wholesale butcher based at 2 Quay Street, was liquidated by David King Thomas, also of 2 Quay Street.

In 1989, it was in extreme disrepair, and, in 1993, it was restored by the builders H. B. Thomas.

In 2002, the building was used as the offices of the county council's Corporate Trading Unit.

=== 3 Quay Street ===
3 Quay Street in 2018

3 Quay Street was built in the early 18th century.

In the 19th century, the building was stuccoed.

On 19 March 1871, Harriet Jones of Llanelli, who was in her seventies, died while visiting her friend, Mary Williams, at 3 Quay Street after accidentally setting light to the curtains beside her bed.

In 1884, it was used as a lodging house by Anne Jones.

In 1902, Sergeant Fred Holland, a saddle tree maker of the 19th Hussars (Prince of Wales' Own), visited Mrs Lloyd at 3 Quay Street. His regiment, under the command of Colonel French, was moved from India to South Africa, and he was present during the siege of Ladysmith.

In 1915, Rebecca Istance died at 3 Quay Street. She had lived with Mrs Lloyd at 3 Quay Street for the previous 15 years.

It was designated as grade II in 1954.

In 1960, 3 Quay Street was the office of the Farmers' Union.

In 2002, the building was used as offices of solicitors and accountants.
