= Pont-ar-Gothi =

Village in Carmarthenshire, Wales

Coordinates: 51°52′26″N 4°10′23″W

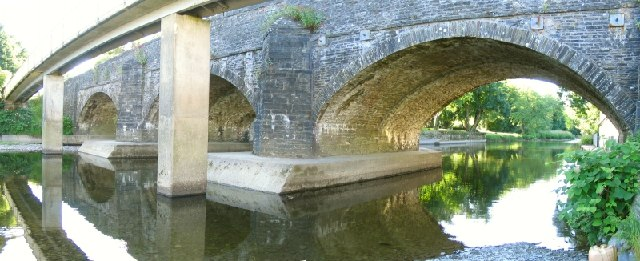
Bridge over the Cothi river at Pont-ar-Gothi

Pont-ar-gothi (otherwise Pontargothi or Cothi Bridge) is a village in Carmarthenshire, West Wales. The village takes its name from the bridge where the A40 trunk road crosses the River Cothi. It lies some 10 miles (16 km) east of Carmarthen.

== Cothi Bridge Show ==
Cothi Bridge Agricultural Society was established in 1898. The Cothi Bridge Show contains breeders and exhibitors and attracts visitors from a large area. It also has a ladies section that was introduced in 1972.

== Holy Trinity Church ==
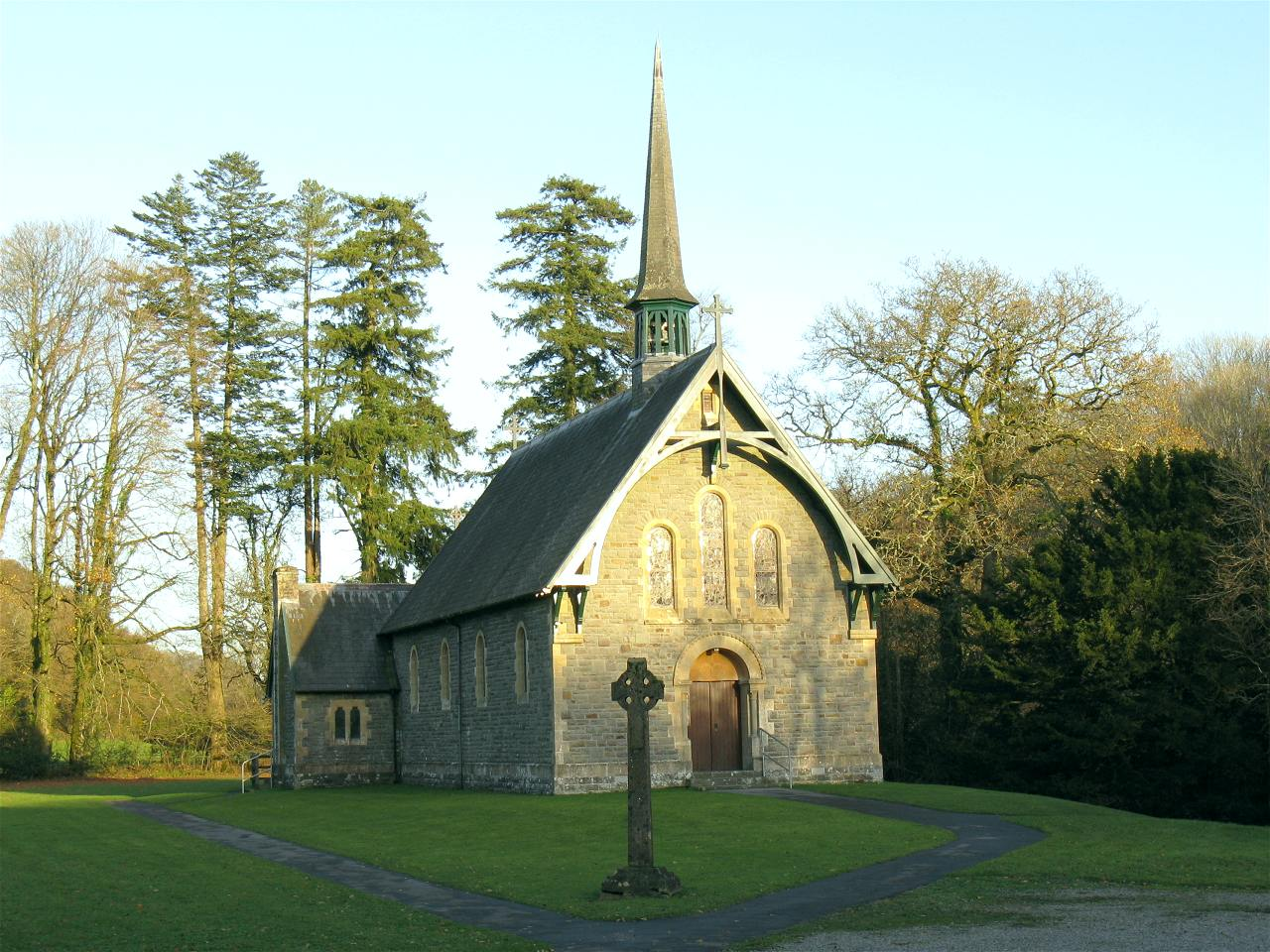
Holy Trinity church

The building of Holy Trinity Church was mostly funded by Henry Bath, whose family made a fortune as Cornish tin producers. When the tin ran out, they exported coal from Swansea and imported copper ore and guano.

The coming of the railway to the Tywi Valley had allowed Bath to buy land to build a mansion and commute to Swansea. Alltyferin, a substantial Victorian house, was completed in 1868.

An ardent churchman, Bath did not want to enforce English services on the parish church in Llanegwad but was unwilling for his household to attend services in Welsh. Construction of Holy Trinity Church began in 1865, but it was not dedicated until 1878. It is a Grade II*-listed building

The church was built on land which had belonged to Talley Abbey, a half-mile from the mansion and linked to it by a wooden bridge over the Cothi. The bridge was later taken down at the same time as Alltyferin Mansion.

The architect was Benjamin Bucknall, who was a friend of the Baths and had worked with them on Swansea Docks. Bucknall employed his friend Alfred Stansell to richly decorate the interior with painted murals. Biblical scenes form a frieze and the ceiling, and the walls are covered in Gothic patterns.

Over the years fumes from a coke heater blackened every surface until the paintings were hardly visible. In 2007, the interior was restored to the original colours. The restoration uncovered a further signature near the roof, "Rawlins, Taunton", who was presumably an assistant to Stansell.

Bath only saw the plans of the church, as he died on a voyage home from Chile in 1875 at the age of 54. His nephew, Edward, inherited and continued the work. Bath and his wife, having no children, had been generous benefactors to the locality, building a school so that the tenants' children did not have to walk to Llanegwad.

== War Memorial Hall ==
The village hall was built in remembrance of local men who died in WW1. The hall is used for a wide range of activities and events.
