= Abergorlech =

Village in Carmarthenshire, Wales

Coordinates: 51.983333°N 4.066667°W

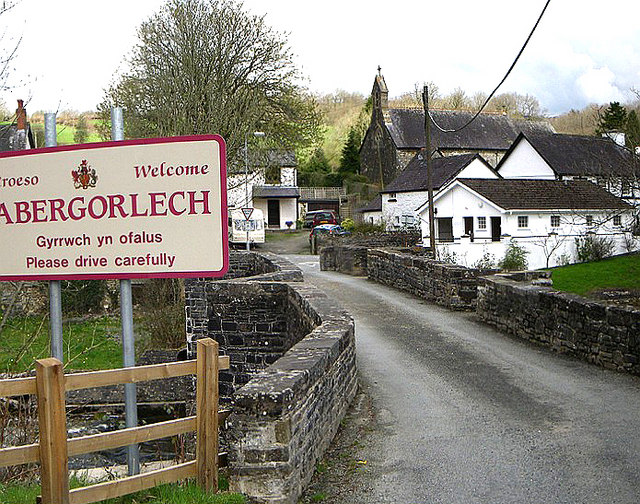
- Abergorlech in 2006

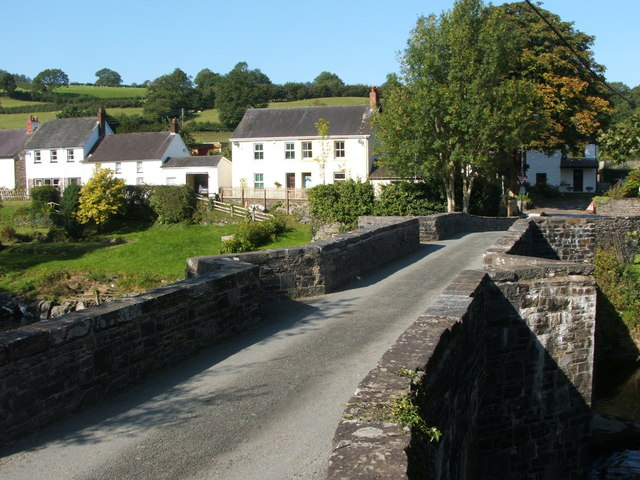
- Bridge over River Cothi at Abergorlech in 2008

- Location within Carmarthenshire
- Community: Llanfihangel Rhos-y-Corn
- Principal area: Carmarthenshire
- Preserved county: Dyfed
- Country: Wales
- Sovereign state: United Kingdom
- Police: Dyfed-Powys
- Fire: Mid and West Wales
- Ambulance: Welsh
- UK Parliament: Caerfyrddin
- Senedd Cymru – Welsh Parliament: Carmarthen East and Dinefwr

Abergorlech is a village 13 kilometres (8 mi) to the north-west of Llandeilo in Carmarthenshire, Wales. It lies on the River Cothi on the B4310 road, between Brechfa to the southwest and Llansawel to the northeast.

The Pont Cothi bridge, which crosses the River Cothi in the centre of the village, is a grade II* listed building.

Abergorlech gets its name from the Afon Gorlech, a minor river which joins the Cothi on the eastern edge of the village.

The village is connected to Dafydd Gorlech (fl. c. 1410–1490), one of the poets of the nobility.
