= Neuadd Fawr =

Listed building in Wales

General information
- Location: Llanwrda,Carmarthenshire, Wales
- Coordinates: 51.968558°N 3.873674°W

Listed Building – Grade II*
- Official name: Neuadd Fawr
- Designated: 8 July 1966
- Reference no.: 10956

Neuadd Fawr, also known as Neuadd Lwyd, is a grade II* listed building in Llanwrda, Carmarthenshire.

== Description ==
Neuadd Fawr (transl. Great Hall), sometimes known as Neuadd Lwyd (transl. Grey Hall), is located just outside the village of Llanwrda on the east bank of the Dulais. It is an important surviving gentry house from the late 17th century with its original Jacobean staircase, whose name may refer to the building previously on the site.

The building is T-shaped and built over 2 storeys from whitewashed rubble stone. There was an added section left of the rear wing, which was demolished in the mid to later 20th century. The staircase has similar balusters to a surviving one at Pentre Meurig, Llanwrda.

== History ==
It may be the site of the medieval llys of Gwestfa Llanwrda.

In the late 16th century or early 17th century, the property was owned by Bennett Fortescue, whose daughter married Thomas Powell of Pentre Meurig, grandfather of John Powell. The house probably originates from the 17th century with later alterations. It was built by a squire for his daughter and son-in-law, who was a barrister, who moved to Wales from Ireland.

In 1767, the house was occupied by John Price. In 1837, it was owned by Charles Bishop of Dolgarreg, Myddfai, and Eleanor Jones was the tenant. In 1867, the tenant was John Morgan.

It was designated grade II* listed in 1966.

The building had been in increasingly poor condition since the 1970s, and, by 1999, it had become derelict. The house was in danger of subsidence, and its walls have since been reinforced with steel. In 2003, the house was falling into disrepair, but it was restored over three years.

It was featured on Y Ty Cymreig on S4C in 2008, at which time it was available as holiday accommodation.
