= Nantgaredig =

Village in Carmarthenshire, Wales

Coordinates: 51°52′26″N 4°11′22″W

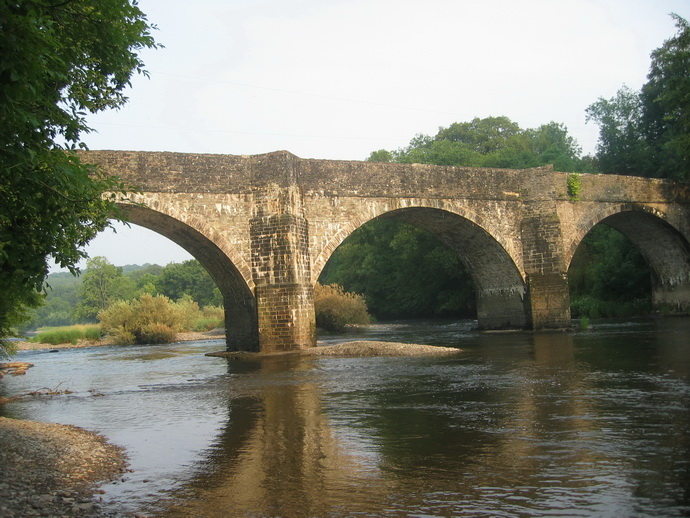
The Llandeilo Yr Ynys Bridge near Nantgaredig

Nantgaredig is a village in Carmarthenshire, Wales. It is about 4 miles (6.4 km) east of the county town of Carmarthen on the A40 in the parish of Llanegwad. The population was around 524 as of the 2011 census.

== Notable people ==
The village is most notable for being the home of the actor Julian Lewis Jones. It is also the home of the former Welsh rugby union footballer Mefin Davies who plays as a hooker in the Wales national rugby union team.

The winner of the 1990 Cheltenham Gold Cup, Norton's Coin, was trained by Sirrel Griffiths at his farm at Nantgaredig.

Fin Gough and Sioned Cray, who appeared on Season 5 of Race Across the World, are from Nantgaredig.
