= Llanarthney =

Village and community in Carmarthenshire, Wales

Coordinates: 51°51′42″N 4°07′52″W

- Community
- Location within Carmarthenshire
- Principal area: Carmarthenshire
- Country: Wales
- Sovereign state: United Kingdom
- Police: Dyfed-Powys
- Fire: Mid and West Wales
- Ambulance: Welsh
- List of places UK Wales Carmarthenshire Map of the community

Llanarthney (Welsh: Llanarthne; Welsh pronunciation) is a village and community in Carmarthenshire, south-west Wales. It is situated on the B4300 road, 12 km (7.5 miles) east of Carmarthen and 10 km (6 miles) west of Llandeilo. The community had a population at the 2001 census of 738, of whom 61 per cent were Welsh-speaking. At the 2011 census the population had increased slightly to 765.

Llanarthney is bordered (clockwise from the north) by the Carmarthenshire communities of Llanegwad, Llangathen, Llanfihangel Aberbythych, Gorslas, Llanddarog, Llangunnor, and Abergwili.

== Amenities ==
Llanarthney has been home to the National Botanic Garden of Wales since 2000.

- Llanarthney Village Hall
