= Castell Moel =

Manor house remains in Carmarthenshire, Wales

Coordinates: 51.8259°N 4.3301°W

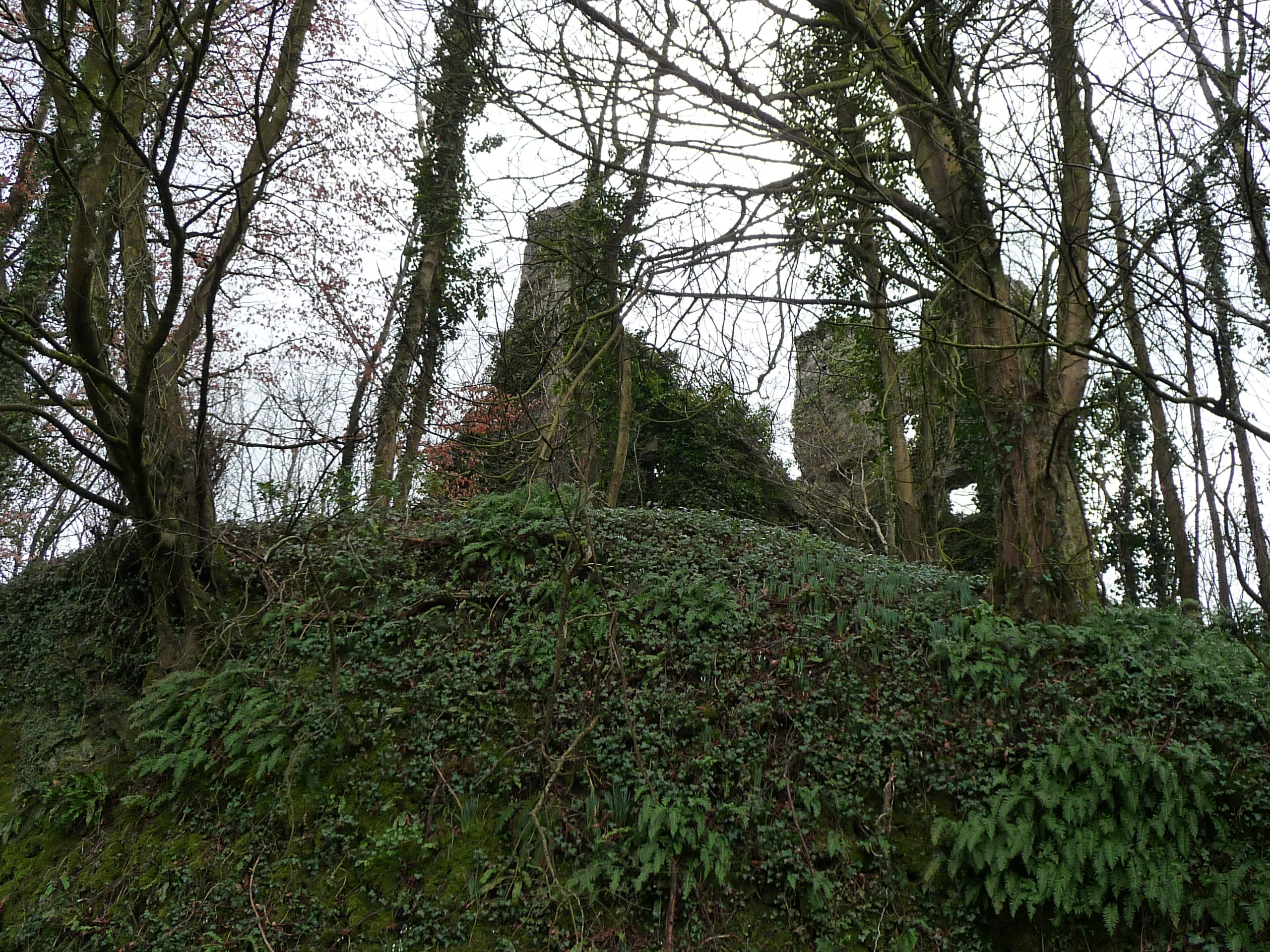
Castell Moel from Llansteffan Road

Castell Moel (also known as Greencastle, Green Castle, Humphreys Castle, or Castle Mole) is the remains of a 16th-century fortified manor house in the community of Llangain in Carmarthenshire, Wales, and also a medieval motte about 600 yards (550 m) to the south of the manor house. The remains are approximately 2.5 miles (4.0 km) south-west Carmarthen and 0.8 miles (1.3 km) north-east of the village of Llangain. Three miles to the north-west is Carmarthen Castle, and five miles to the south-west is Llansteffan Castle.

In 1917 the then Royal Commission on the Ancient and Historical Monuments of Wales and Monmouthshire (now RCAHMW) described the site as "showing a few vestiges of the foundation walls of what appears to be a 14th or early 15th-century castle". The existence of Castell Moel in the 15th century is confirmed by a poem by Lewis Glyn Cothi, "I Nicolas Ryd o Castell Moel."

The castle stands on a plateau overlooking the River Towy, and the overgrown remains are now thought to be of a late medieval L-plan hall house, once owned by the Rede family. The main eastern block is a first-floor hall and set in the re-entrant angle, is an adjoining high stair turret. The western block is a two-storey wing, with a porch and a cellar, and the walls of the castle, once supported a crenellated parapet. It is doubtful that the building was ever intended to be defended.

The 1917 report also stated that the remains of a motte and bailey castle were easily traceable and became known as the old castle. A much more recent (sometime after 1990) visit by the Dyfed Archaeological Trust could find no trace of the older castle. The Archaeological Trust has yet to visit Old Castle. If you do, the old motte can be seen as stated in the 1917 report.

The Wales Coast Path (Carmarthen to Llansteffan section) passes through the associated Green Castle Woods, a nature reserve managed by the Woodland Trust.

== See also ==
- List of castles in Wales
- Castles in Great Britain and Ireland
