= Carmarthen Bay Ferries Community Interest Company =

Welsh amphibious ferry

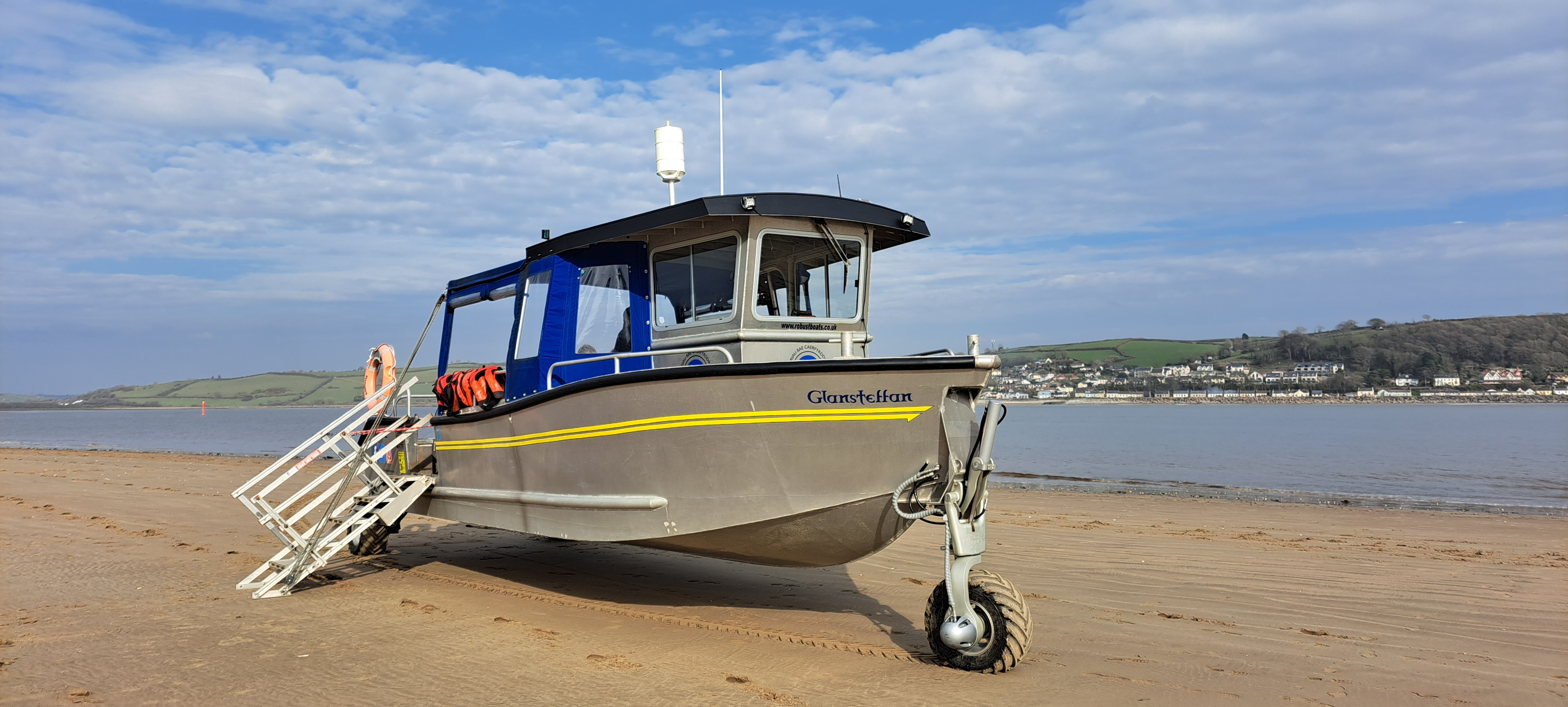
- Trade name: Carmarthen Bay Ferries
- Type: Community interest company
- Industry: Ferry
- Founded: 21 March 2017; 9 years ago
- Founder: Professor Kenton Morgan (Chair (officer))
- Headquarters: Calon y Fferi, Ferryside, Carmarthenshire, Wales. SA17 5TE.
- Area served: Carmarthen Bay
- Key people: In addition to the chair, directors: Celia Strange; Andrew Kirkpatrick; Charles Etty-Leal; Mark Foxton; Neil Walker
- Services: Ferry crossings; Boat trips; Private charter trips; Private scattering of ashes
- Website: carmarthenbayferries.com

Carmarthen Bay Ferries Community Interest Company, known as Carmarthen Bay Ferries, operates a ferry in Carmarthenshire, Wales, offering scenic crossings and boat trips on the River Towy between the villages of Ferryside and Llansteffan. The boat Glansteffan is a specially-designed amphibious vehicle, which features retractable wheels for easy access to the shore.

== History ==
Records indicate that a ferry service between the coastal communities of Ferryside and Llansteffan operated in some form or another since 1170 in the Middle Ages. The service was an important transportation link, carrying both goods and pilgrims en route to St Davids, Pembrokeshire. Following improvements to road and rail links during the 20th century, the ferry service ceased to operate in 1948, leaving walkers and cyclists with an 18-mile (29 km) trip up the estuary and down the other side.

The current ferry service run by has been in operation since 2018. The founding directors, Professor Kenton Morgan, Dr W Lesley Jones, Gerald Howells, Dr David Hunter, Robert Bamforth, Christopher Jones, and Mark Kessell were successful in applying for a £300,000 grant from the National Lottery Community Fund.

== Glansteffan ==
Carmarthen Bay Ferries' boat Glansteffan was named by the pupils from the primary schools in Ferryside and Llansteffan, and takes its name from the Welsh for Ferryside (Glan y Fferi) and Llansteffan.

The boat was designed by Edgar van Smaalen of Bruce Roberts Europe B.V., marine architects based in the Netherlands. It was built by Robust Boats of St Davids and utilises an amphibious wheel system supplied by Sealegs Amphibious Craft of New Zealand.

Glansteffan is equipped with the latest safety and navigational aids, and the ferry crossings are dog-friendly, although dogs are not allowed on the longer boat trips.

=== Statistics ===
Hull length	8 metres (26 ft)
Hull beam	3 metres (10 ft)
Draft	0.5 metres (20 in)
Total length (including wheels and engines)	9 metres (30 ft)
Mass (without passengers)	2,540 kilograms (5,600 lb)
Max loaded mass	3,500 kilograms (7,700 lb)
Max speed (on land)	8 kilometres per hour (5 mph)
Max speed (on water)	30 knots (56 km/h; 35 mph)
Cruising speed (on water)	15–20 knots (28–37 km/h; 17–23 mph)
Range	100 nautical miles (190 km; 120 mi)
Engines (on water)	Twin Yamaha 115 hp four-stroke engines
Engine (on land)	Vanguard Marine 35 hp engine, providing hydraulic power to raise and lower wheels and drive
Capacity	2 crew, 10 passengers
Bikes and wheelchairs	5 bikes or 2 wheelchairs

== Organisational structure ==
Carmarthen Bay Ferries is managed and operated by a dedicated team of volunteers and paid professionals. The structure includes:

- Volunteer directors: The board of directors is composed of volunteers who oversee the strategic direction and governance of the ferry service.
- Paid contractor skippers: The ferry is operated by professionally-qualified and commercially-endorsed skippers, who are responsible for the safe navigation and operation of the vessel.
- Volunteer crewmates: Volunteers who assist on the ferry, supporting the skipper and enhancing the passenger experience.
- Volunteer shore crew: A committed team of volunteers who handle shoreside operations, ensuring the smooth boarding and disembarking of passengers.

This blend of volunteers and professionals ensures that Carmarthen Bay Ferries operates efficiently, maintaining high standards of safety and service, while fostering a strong community spirit.

== Service ==
Glansteffan operates between Good Friday to October each year. Outside of school holidays, the service operates Friday, Saturday and Sunday; during school holidays, service is seven days a week.

Due to the tidal nature of the Towy estuary, Glansteffan is able to operate two and a half hours each side of high tide. Typically, the first and last 45 minutes of this time are rapid ferry crossings between Ferryside and Llansteffan; passengers are not able to book these crossings in advance. In between the two periods of ferry crossings, longer estuary and river trips are operated with durations ranging from 15 to 60 minutes, including popular sunset trips; these can be booked in advance on their website.

Glansteffan is available to charter for private parties, corporate events, filming and the scattering of ashes.

== Carmarthen Bay Ferries in the media ==
Glansteffan has made a number of appearances in national media, including the BBC's Escape to the Country, ITV's Coast & Country, Radio 4's The Patch, and Wynne Evans and Joanna Page: Lost at Sea. It has also been featured in videos made by YouTubers Cruising the Cut and Auto Shenigans.
