= Lynette Roberts =

Welsh poet and novelist

- Born: 4 July 1909; Buenos Aires, Argentina
- Died: 26 September 1995 (aged 86); Ferryside, Carmarthenshire, Wales
- Education: Central School for Arts and Crafts
- Occupations: Poet, novelist
- Spouse: Keidrych Rhys
- Writing career
- Language: English
- Notable works: Poem from Llanbryi, Downbeat

Evelyn ('Lynette') Beatrice Roberts (4 July 1909 – 26 September 1995) was a Welsh poet and novelist. Her poems were about war, landscape, and life in the small Welsh village where she lived. She published two poetry collections: Poems (1944) and Gods with Stainless Ears: A Heroic Poem (1951). Roberts' work was admired by many poets, including: T.S. Eliot, Dylan Thomas and Robert Graves. In later life, Roberts had a mental breakdown and stopped publishing. Her work was largely forgotten for the remainder of her life. She died in 1995.

Roberts provided Welsh-related material for Graves' The White Goddess (1948), and Graves dedicated his book to her. In 1956, Roberts was diagnosed with schizophrenia. She spent much of the rest of her life as a resident of mental institutions.

== Early life ==
Roberts was born 4 July 1909 in Buenos Aires, Argentina, to Cecil Roberts and Ruby Garbutt, both Australians of Welsh descent. Cecil Roberts was a railway engineer, who worked as General Manager of the Buenos Aires Western Railways. The family enjoyed an affluent lifestyle, owning "yachts and racehorses". The family moved to London during World War I where her father enlisted and served as a soldier. He was later wounded.

Roberts and her sisters, Winifred and Rosemary returned to Buenos Aires to attend the Convent School of the Sacred Heart. Her mother, Ruby died of typhus when Roberts was 14 years old. After her mother's death, Roberts and her sisters were sent to Bournemouth, England. Roberts went on to study in London at the Central School for Arts and Crafts. In the 1930s, Roberts and friend Celia Buckmaster started a florist business together. Later, they moved to Madeira, where they lived in a small house and Roberts worked on her poetry.

In 1939, while living in London, Roberts met the Welsh poet, Ronald Rees Jones at a Poetry London Event. Jones wrote under the name Keidrych Rhys. Roberts and Jones married on 4 October 1939 at Llansteffan, Wales. Poet Dylan Thomas was Jones's best man. Jones legally changed his name to Keidrych Rhys in 1940.

== The war years ==
The couple moved to a rented cottage in the small Welsh village of Llanybri during World War II. They lived in relative poverty. During the next 10 years, Roberts worked on her poetry. She began a professional relationship with poet T.S. Eliot, who was an editor at Faber Publishing and became friends with the poet Robert Graves. During this decade, Roberts a produced "an extraordinary and unique body of work". She gave birth to two children toward the end of the war, a daughter, Angharad, born in 1945, and a son, Pridein, born in 1946. In 1949, Roberts and Rhys divorced.

Between now and then, I will offer you
A fist full of rock cress fresh from the bank
The valley tips of garlic red with dew
Cooler than shallots, a breath you can swank

In the village when you come. At noon-day
I will offer you a choice bowl of cawl
Served with a 'lover's' spoon and a chopped spray
Of leeks or savori fach...

— From "Poem from Llanybri", 1946

In Llanybri, Roberts painted, wrote poetry and raised her family. In 1944 her collection Poems were published by Faber and Faber. She immortalised her village in her "Poem from Llanybri". This poem was addressed to the poet, Alun Lewis, to whom Roberts confessed to being attracted. In 1944 and 1945 drafts of Robert Graves's The White Goddess were published in Keidrych Rhys's periodical, Wales. Roberts was the dedicatee of Robert Graves's The White Goddess in its first edition (1948), having provided much of the Welsh material used by him. Faber and Faber published her Gods with stainless ears: a heroic poem in 1951. Her documentary novel, The Endeavour: Captain Cook's first voyage to Australia was published in 1954.

== Mental breakdown, late life and death ==
In 1956, she had a serious mental breakdown and was diagnosed with schizophrenia. During these years, Roberts became a Jehovah's Witness and stopped writing. She spent time in and out of mental institutions until her death in 1995. Later in life, Roberts repudiated her work and refused to permit her published poetry to be reprinted.

Her final years from 1989 were spent at a retirement home, in Ferryside, Carmarthenshire. Aged 86, she died there on 26 September 1995. She is buried in the churchyard in Llanybri.

== Posthumous publications ==
After Roberts's death, an edition of her collected poems was issued by Seren Press but was immediately withdrawn because of legal problems with the Roberts estate; a new Collected Poems finally appeared in 2006 from Carcanet, edited by Patrick McGuinness.

A volume of miscellaneous prose, diaries from her time in Llanybri, correspondence with Robert Graves, memoirs of the Sitwells and T. S. Eliot, an essay on "village dialect" and short stories appeared in 2008. An unpublished novel, Nesta, written in 1944, is apparently lost.

== Selected publications ==
=== Poetry collections ===
- Poems (1944)
- God with Stainless Ears: A Heroic Poem (1951)
- Collected Poems (2005)
- Diaries, Letters, and Recollections (2008),

=== Other publications ===
- 1944 – An introduction to village dialect: with seven stories (The Druid Press)
- 1954 – The Endeavour: Captain Cook's first voyage to Australia (Peter Owen)
