= Celia Buckmaster =

British novelist and poet

Celia Buckmaster (1914–2005) was a British novelist and poet whose novels centered on English village life.

== Early years ==
Celia Joyce was born in 1914, the daughter of barrister Henry Stephen Guy Buckmaster.

In her twenties, she and a friend, poet Lynette Roberts, went into business, setting up as florists. At some point they took time off from the business and traveled by cargo boat to Madeira, where they lived for a time. Roberts began writing poetry seriously, and Celia may have worked on her painting, because she was referred to as a promising painter only a few years later. On their return journey to England, their ship, the cruise liner Hilary, ran aground in fog at Carmel Head.

In 1940, she married anthropologist Edmund Leach, who was then in the military; the marriage took place in Rangoon, Burma, where Leach was stationed. They had a daughter, Louisa in 1941, and Buckmaster spent time both writing and painting. As World War II intensified in the region, Buckmaster escaped with her daughter, leaving as part of an airlift of nursing mothers in early 1942. Reunited at the end of the war, the couple had a son, Alexander in 1946.

== Writing ==
Beginning around 1940, Buckmaster published poems in magazines such as Poetry: London, Twentieth Century Verse, and Seven. She also published at least one short story and a book review of a novel by Neil M. Gunn in Wales magazine.

In the early 1950s, Buckmaster published her only two novels, Village Story (1951) and Family Ties (1952), both with the prestigious Hogarth Press founded by Leonard Woolf and Virginia Woolf. Village Story was praised by the writers John Betjeman and Stevie Smith when it first appeared. Both novels focus on life in an English village, following the dynamics of various relationships with a mixture of warmth and wry humor that recalls such contemporary writers as Barbara Pym.

Buckmaster and Leach spent a lot of 1961 in California, where Buckmaster returned to painting. In 1966 Edmund Leach became Provost of King's College, Cambridge. After his retirement, he and his wife settled in the nearby village of Barrington. Leach died in 1989 and Buckmaster in 2005.
