= St Ishmael, Carmarthenshire =

Hamlet and community in Carmarthenshire, Wales

Coordinates: 51.745°N 4.370°W

St Ishmael
- Hamlet and community
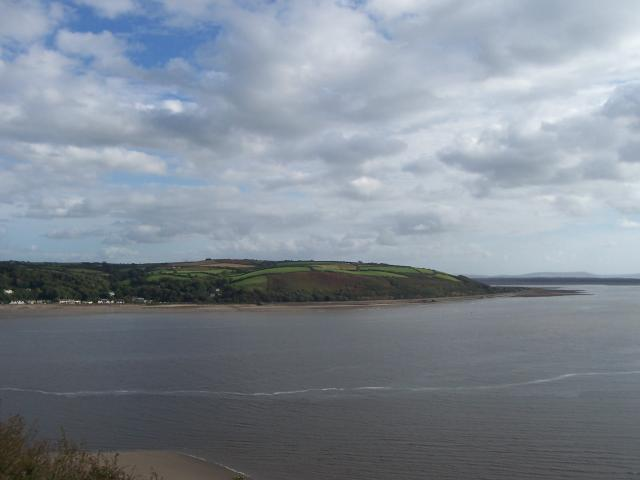
- View of St Ishmael, on the East of the River Towy, taken from Llansteffan Castle on the West.

- Location within Carmarthenshire
- Principal area: Carmarthenshire
- Country: Wales
- Sovereign state: United Kingdom
- Police: Dyfed-Powys
- Fire: Mid and West Wales
- Ambulance: Welsh
- List of places UK Wales Carmarthenshire Map of the community

St Ishmael (Welsh: Llanismel or Llanishmael) is a hamlet and community in Carmarthenshire, Wales. The community population taken at the 2011 census was 1,327. It comprises the villages of Ferryside and Llansaint and the surrounding rural areas. The community is bordered by the communities of: Llandyfaelog; Kidwelly; Pembrey and Burry Port Town; and Llansteffan, all being in Carmarthenshire. It is named for the 6th-century Breton prince and Welsh saint Isfael.

== History ==
In 2017, a 12th century medieval settlement was discovered in St Ishmael during an archaeological dig, which determined that it had been abandoned. This came after winds in 1999 had blown sands away, revealing medieval walls and cooking vessels. In 2012, a Bronze Age hoard of treasure was found in St Ishmael, which included 13 bronze items dating to 1000 BC. The church, around which the hamlet is centred, was first mentioned as standing in 1115.

== Governance ==
An electoral ward in the same name existed. This ward stretched north from St. Ishmael to include Llandyfaelog, with a total population of 2,674. Local county councillor, Mair Stephens, died on 9 January 2022 after a long illness. She had been an independent county councillor for St Ishmael since 2004, becoming deputy leader of the county council.

Following a local government boundary review (and despite opposition from St Ishmael's and Llandyfaelog's community councils), the St Ishmael ward was reconfigured, losing Llandyfaelog and combining with neighbouring Kidwelly to become 'Kidwelly and St Ishmael' from the May 2022 local elections. The new ward elects two county councillors.
