= Llanybri =

Village in Carmarthenshire, Wales

Coordinates: 51.7869°N 4.4122°W

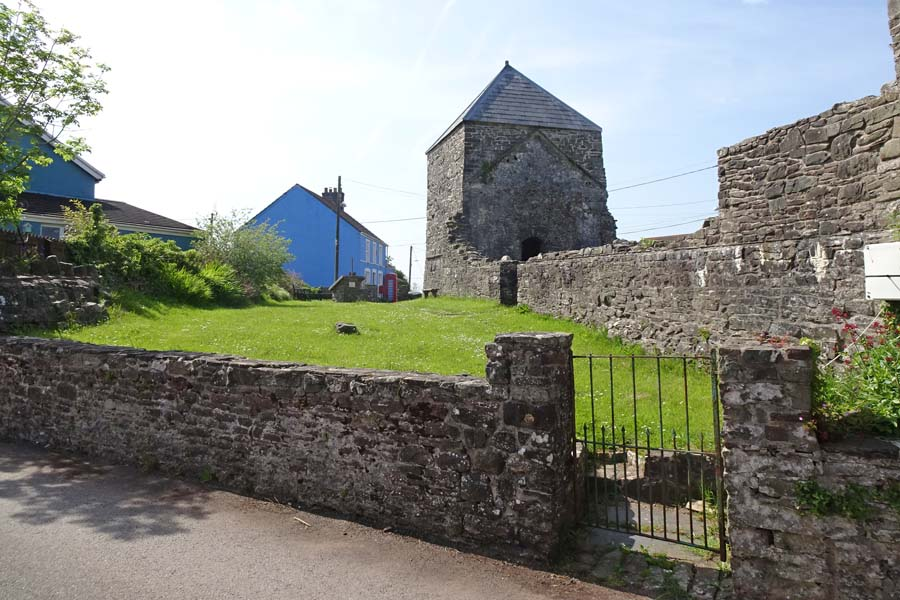
- Yr Hen Gapel (The Old Chapel)

- Location within Carmarthenshire
- Community: Llansteffan
- Principal area: Carmarthenshire
- Preserved county: Dyfed
- Country: Wales
- Sovereign state: United Kingdom
- Post town: CARMARTHEN
- Postcode district: SA33
- Dialling code: 01267
- Police: Dyfed-Powys
- Fire: Mid and West Wales
- Ambulance: Welsh
- UK Parliament: Caerfyrddin
- Senedd Cymru – Welsh Parliament: Carmarthen West and South Pembrokeshire

Llanybri is a rural farming village situated between the estuaries of the River Tywi and River Taf in Carmarthenshire, Wales. It is one of two villages with their own churches in the community of Llansteffan (the other being Llansteffan on the Tywi estuary).

== Description and history ==
Llanybri developed, under the ownership of the Lords of Llansteffan and Penrhyn, around a central open area of common land and a chapel dedicated to St Mary.

The Holy Trinity Church and a non-conformist chapel were built in the 19th century at opposite ends of the village.

The village lay at the junction of seven roads.

== Churches ==
Churches in the village of Llanybri: Holy Trinity Church, Capel Newydd Welsh Independent Chapel, and Hen Gapel (or St Mary's Church).

=== Holy Trinity Church ===
Holy Trinity Church is an Anglican church in Llanybri. It was built in 1851 in the Gothic architectural style from purple sandstone with slate roofs and a tower. It has a marble pulpit made in 1891 and an octagonal font with marble panels.

=== Capel Newydd Welsh Independent Chapel ===
Capel Newydd is a Welsh Independent Chapel in Llandybri. It was built in 1814, rebuilt in 1873, and restored in 1959.

=== Hen Gapel ===
The chapel was known as Morabrichurch in the 14th century and by the 16th century was called Marbell Church.

The chapel had become an Independent church by 1790. It eventually closed in 1962. After a fire, most of the church building was demolished, though the tower became a Grade II listed building. It is known as Yr Hen Gapel (transl. The Old Chapel).

== Writers ==
The writers Lynette Roberts and Keidrych Rhys lived in the village. Dylan Thomas was a frequent visitor to the village pub, the Farmers' Arms, both when he lived near Llansteffan and in Laugharne. The landlady gave an account of his visits.

Thomas' maternal aunt, Anne Gwyn, once lived in Plas Uchaf, while one of his great-aunts had lived in Plas Isaf.
