= Ferryside television relay station =

Ferryside
- Location: Ferryside, Carmarthenshire
- Mast height: 17 metres (56 ft)
- Coordinates: 51°46′08″N 4°21′41″W
- Grid reference: SN371104
- Relay of: Preseli
- BBC region: BBC Wales
- ITV region: ITV Cymru Wales

Ferryside television relay station is a small TV relay in the village of Ferryside, Carmarthenshire, Wales (grid reference SN371104). The Ferryside relay is fed with the off-air signal from Preseli about 17 miles (28 km) to the northwest. It is one of the few UK broadcasting transmitters using a wooden pole as aerial tower. It was built in 1985 partly to provide a stronger signal to Ferryside itself, but also to lower Llansteffan on the western side of the estuary which could not receive a usable signal either from Preseli nor from Carmel about 14 miles (22 km) to the northeast.

== Digital switchover ==
The Ferryside relay is unique because it was chosen as the site of the UK's experimental switchover trial, and as such became the first UK TV transmitter to be converted to digital, complete with the loss of the old analogue TV signal. This mimicked what would actually start to happen later in the decade as the analogue TV signals were progressively turned off in favour of DVB across the country as whole.

At the end of 2004, the relay was equipped to provide the four primary DTT multiplexes (Multiplex 1, 2, A and B) and after a three-month period, all local residents were given Freeview boxes. Three of the four analogue services were switched off at midnight on 30 March 2005.

Only BBC Two Wales analogue remained. There had reportedly been some local concerns, caused by the differing content of the BBC 2W digital service compared with BBC Two Wales analogue.

BBC Two Wales analogue was finally switched off as part of the full digital switchover in the Preseli region which happened four years later between 19 August and 16 September 2009.

== Transmitted services ==
=== Analogue television ===
==== 1985 - 29 November 2004 ====
The site came into service in 1985 with the full complement of four UK terrestrial analogue services in place from the start.

Frequency	UHF	kW	Service
471.25 MHz	21	0.023	BBC1 Wales
495.25 MHz	24	0.023	HTV Wales
519.25 MHz	27	0.023	BBC2 Wales
551.25 MHz	31	0.023	S4C

=== Analogue and digital television ===
==== 29 November 2004 - 30 March 2005 ====
The Ferryside "digital switchover" trial commenced with four of the pre-DSO multiplexes from Presely being re-radiated in the gaps between the existing analogue TV channels. The BBC multiplexes were trialled with the ultra-low ERP of 1 W, the COM multiplexes with 5 W.

Frequency	UHF	kW	Service	System
471.25 MHz	21	0.023	BBC1 Wales	PAL System I
489.833 MHz	23-	0.001	BBC Mux B	DVB-T
495.25 MHz	24	0.023	HTV Wales	PAL System I
513.833 MHz	26-	0.001	BBC Mux 1	DVB-T
519.25 MHz	27	0.023	BBC2 Wales	PAL System I
545.833 MHz	30-	0.005	Digital 3&4 Mux 2	DVB-T
551.25 MHz	31	0.023	S4C	PAL System I
578.000 MHz	34	0.005	SDN Mux A	DVB-T

==== 30 March 2005 - 19 August 2009 ====
BBC One Wales, ITV1 Wales and S4C were all switched off in March 2005 and the four digital multiplexes took over on their final intended channel allocations but at an interim ERP of 5 W each until the rest of the area performed its digital switchover four years later. BBC Two Wales continued as an analogue service (but was moved to S4C's old allocation of channel 31).

It appears that the decision to allocate BBC Mux B to channel 27 was a late change, forcing a variation of licence to be agreed with OFCOM.

Frequency	UHF	kW	Service	System
474.166 MHz	21+	0.005	BBC Mux 1	DVB-T
498.000 MHz	24	0.005	SDN Mux A	DVB-T
522.000 MHz	27	0.005	BBC Mux B	DVB-T
545.833 MHz	30-	0.005	Digital 3&4 Mux 2	DVB-T
551.25 MHz	31	0.023	BBC Two Wales	PAL System I

=== Digital television ===
==== 19 August 2009 - 16 September 2009 ====
Analogue BBC Two Wales was finally switched off in August 2009 because digital switchover had commenced at the parent transmitter at Preseli and that was the first analogue channel to be shut down there. The new BBC A multiplex started from Preseli and took over the channel allocation previously used by the "BBC Mux 1" multiplex, using 64-QAM modulation and with its full post-DSO power level of 25 W. Unusually, at Ferryside, the final ERP chosen for the digital multiplexes was actually higher than has previously been used for analogue TV.

Frequency	UHF	kW	Operator
474.166 MHz	21+	0.025	BBC A
498.000 MHz	24	0.005	SDN Mux A
522.000 MHz	27	0.005	BBC Mux B
545.833 MHz	30-	0.005	Digital 3&4 Mux 2

==== 16 September 2009 - Present ====
With the completion of DSO at Preseli, the new digital multiplexes took over at Ferryside at their full post-DSO ERPs. Almost uniquely, Ferryside radiates four multiplexes.

Frequency	UHF	kW	Operator
474.166 MHz	21+	0.025	BBC A
498.000 MHz	24	0.025	BBC B
522.000 MHz	27	0.025	SDN
545.833 MHz	30-	0.005†	Digital 3&4

† Some disagreement as to whether this service is 5 W or 25 W. It is usual practice for Digital 3&4 to be radiated with the same ERP as is used for the BBC multiplexes. OFCOM's own post-DSO documentation does agree with the table shown above however.
