= Ferryside =

Village in Carmarthenshire, Wales

Coordinates: 51.7678°N 4.3693°W

Ferryside: Welsh: Glan-y-fferi
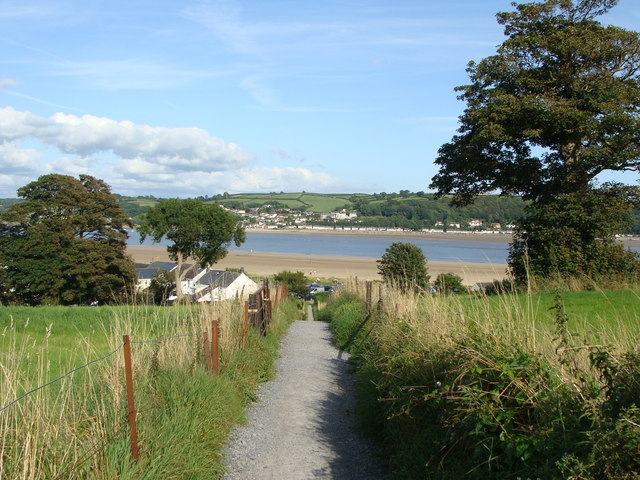
- Ferryside and the River Tywi from Llansteffan

- Location within Carmarthenshire
- Population: 846
- OS grid reference: SN366103
- Community: St Ishmael
- Principal area: Carmarthenshire
- Preserved county: Dyfed
- Country: Wales
- Sovereign state: United Kingdom
- Post town: Ferryside
- Postcode district: SA17
- Police: Dyfed-Powys
- Fire: Mid and West Wales
- Ambulance: Welsh
- UK Parliament: Llanelli
- Senedd Cymru – Welsh Parliament: Carmarthen East and Dinefwr

Ferryside (Welsh: Glan-y-fferi) is a village in the community of St Ishmael, Carmarthenshire, Wales. It is 8.5 miles (13.7 km) south of Carmarthen near the mouth of the River Tywi. Originally a ferry crossing, then becoming a fishing village, it has developed as a holiday and retirement area. The village has its own lifeboat station and was the first village in the UK to switch from analogue to digital television. The 2011 census showed the village to have 846 residents.

== History ==
Originating as a landing-place on the ferry route to Llansteffan (the ferry was used by archbishop Baldwin and Giraldus Cambrensis during his 1188 tour of Wales), Ferryside developed as a fishing village. In 1844 the population of the parish was 895.

Much of the village developed after 1852, when it became linked to Carmarthen and Swansea by Isambard Kingdom Brunel's South Wales Railway.

== Amenities ==
=== School ===
There is a school that has been there for over 150 years.

=== Worship ===
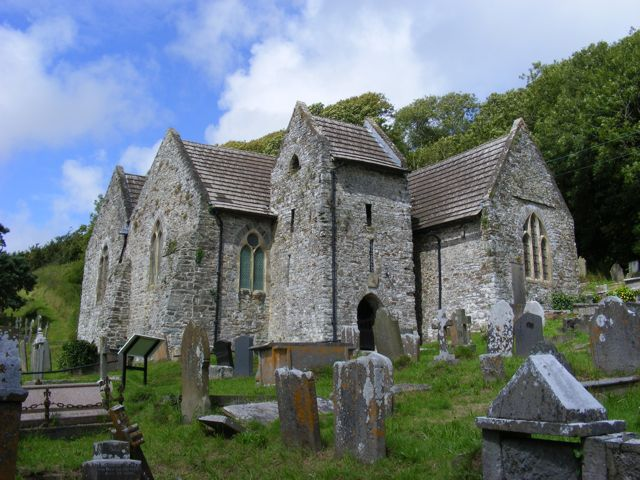
St Ishmael's Church

The parish church is St Ishmael's, built on a rock near the shore. In 2006, the graveyard and grounds were selected for an innovative project aimed at encouraging biodiversity in churchyards. There are two chapels near the centre of the village and another church, St Thomas, in the centre of the village.

=== Facilities ===
Ferryside has a post office, a public house (The White Lion), a sports and social club (previously the rugby club), a general store, hotel (Three Rivers Hotel & Spa), antiques shop and caravan park.

=== Transport ===
Ferryside railway station has regular rail connections to London Paddington, Pembroke Dock, Milford Haven, Carmarthen, Swansea and Cardiff. Bus services connect to Carmarthen and Llanelli.

=== Ferry crossing ===
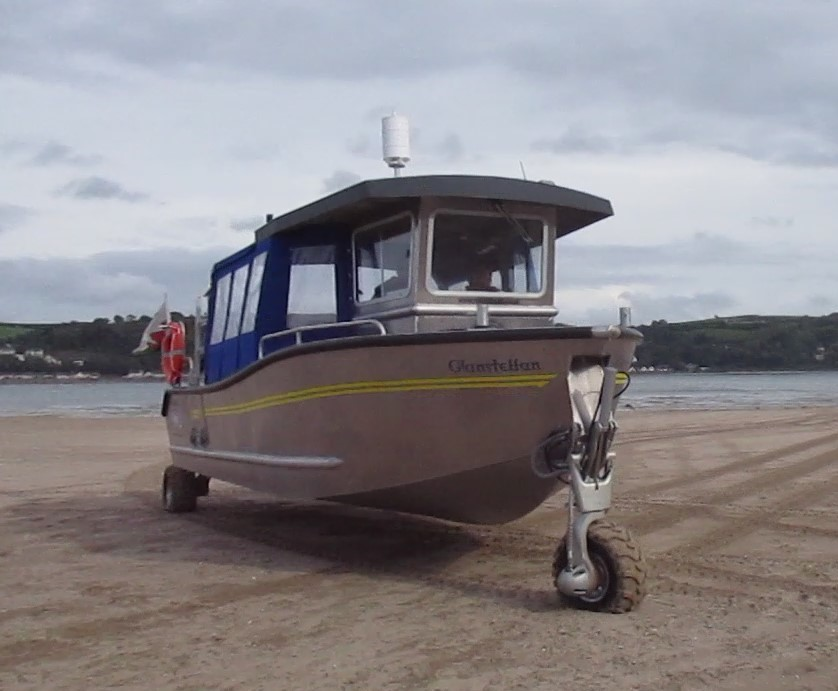
The new ferry, Glansteffan

The ferry service across the River Tywi to Llansteffan was discontinued in the 1950s.

A new service was launched in 2018 by Carmarthen Bay Ferries using a customized Sealegs Amphibious Craft offering 5-10 minute crossings to Llansteffan and 45 minute estuary and 1 hour sunset trips, having received a grant of £300,000 from the Coastal Communities Fund. The grant had been applied for by a former resident of the community, Professor Kenton Morgan and local reactions to the service and the culture of grantsmanship was covered in a BBC Radio 4 programme.

=== Community magazine ===
STISH is a monthly magazine by the St Ishmael's community for the villagers of Ferryside and Llansaint, run by volunteers to bring news of local events and articles of local interest. Ferryside Village Forum is an online source of information.

=== Sailing ===
Ferryside is home to the River Towy Yacht Club.

=== Lifeboat station ===
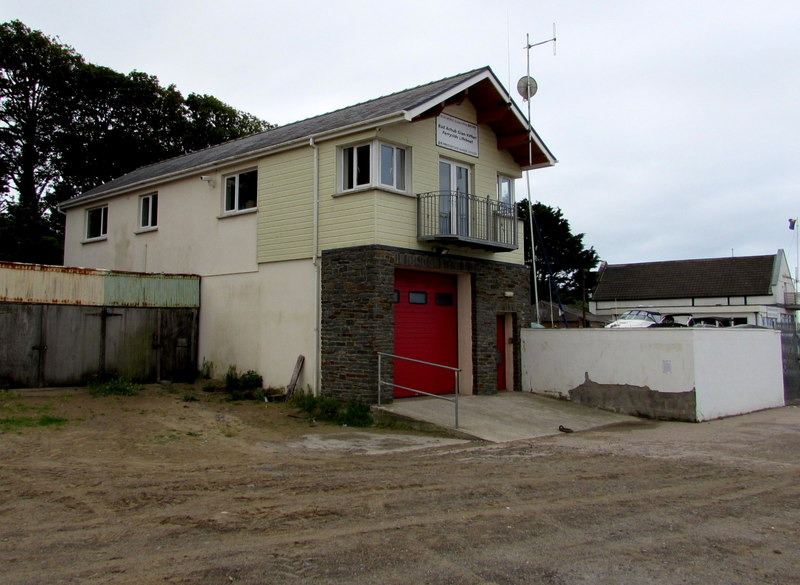
Ferryside Lifeboat Station

Carmarthen Lifeboat Station was first established in 1835 at Laugharne, 11 years after Sir William Hillary founded the Royal National Institution for the Preservation of Life from Shipwreck (RNIPLS) in 1824, which later became the Royal National Lifeboat Institution (RNLI) in 1854. The station operated until 1843.

A new station, Carmarthen Bay Lifeboat Station, was established at Ferryside by the RNLI in 1860, becoming Ferryside Lifeboat Station in 1893, but ultimately closing on 30 June 1960, when the need for its services declined.

An Independent lifeboat service was established in 1966, one of more than 80 such stations around Britain and Ireland. Formerly part of St John Cymru, the ambulance charity, the lifeboat is launched in coordination with HM Coastguard in response to ’999′ calls and distress calls on VHF CH16. With the second largest tidal rise and fall in the world making the local waters hostile, the lifeboat is available 24 hours a day throughout the year. It is staffed by local volunteers who rely on donations to the service for its funding.

The current lifeboat station was constructed in 2010 and opened by The Duchess of Gloucester. The service uses a 6.4 m (21 ft) Ribcraft semi rigid inflatable boat with twin 115-hp engines, and a smaller craft. Callouts average 28 a year, a number that is rising as a result of an increase in leisure craft. The station received a government grant to buy new equipment in 2017.

In 2025, for reasons of mutual benefit, Ferryside Lifeboat split from St Johns Cymru, and is now operated as a standalone service and charity.

== Fishing ==
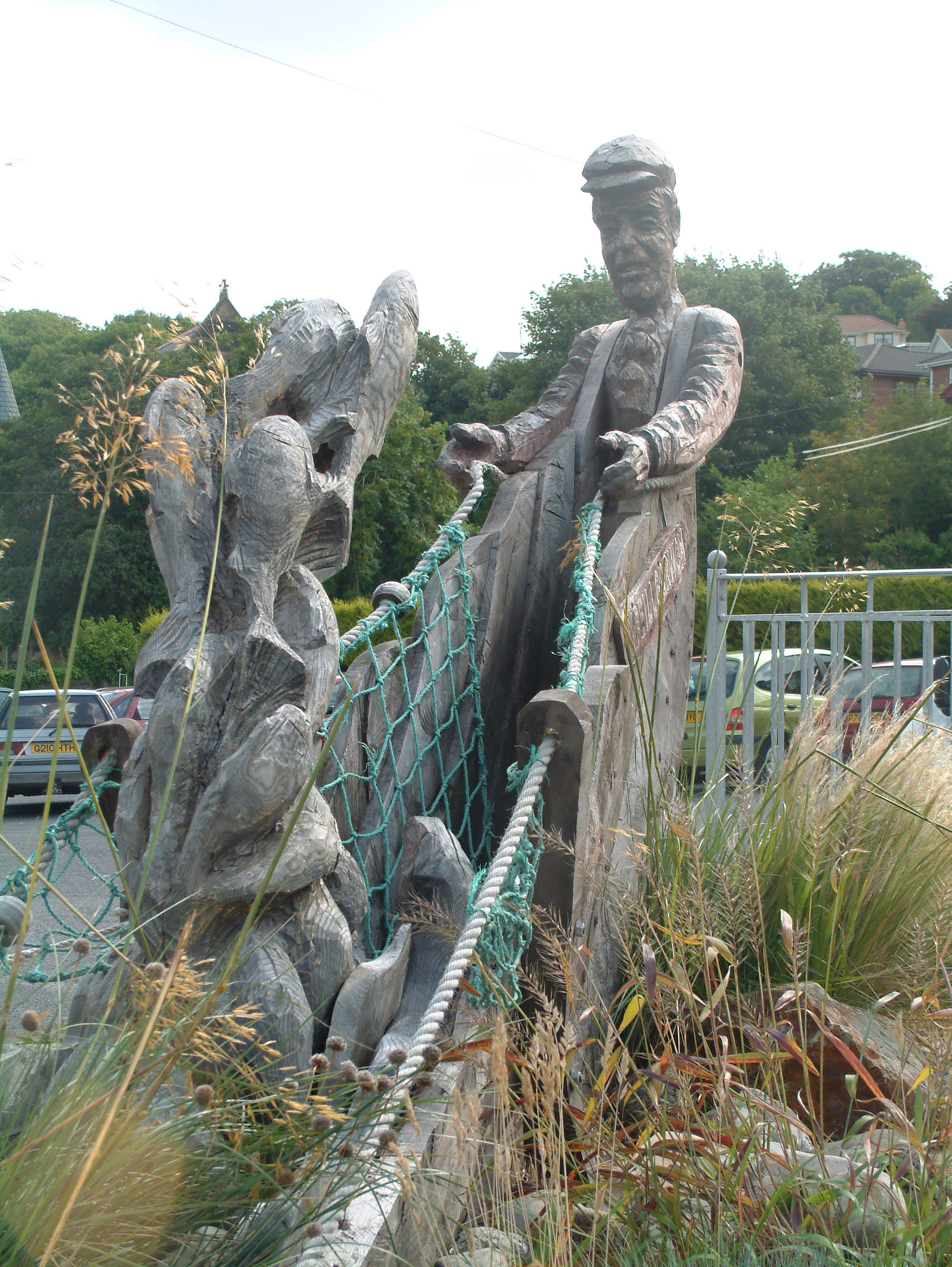
The fishing sculpture in Ferryside

Ferryside developed as a fishing village, particularly for shellfish.

=== Cockles ===
Along with Laugharne, Ferryside was once at the heart of the cockling industry in Carmarthen Bay. Cocklewomen from Llansaint could collect about 650 tons of cockles a year, and did so until around 1900. The cockle industry now experiences intermittent bursts of activity when the Ferryside cocklebeds are opened to commercial pickers: intensive 'strip-cockling' occurs and several hundred cockle-pickers work the estuary beds with tractors.

In 1993, Ferryside saw what are known locally as 'the cockle wars': fights between rival gangs on the beach, notably between gangs from the Gower Peninsula, Liverpool, the Dee estuary and Glasgow. Because commercial quantities of cockles at Ferryside were rare, there were no licences required to harvest them. In addition to gaining the village rare visibility on the front pages of national newspapers, the cockle wars led to a Parliamentary debate and calls for the beds to be licensed.

== Analogue television switch off ==
On 30 March 2005, Ferryside and Llansteffan became the first areas in the United Kingdom to lose their analogue television signals. Residents of the Carmarthenshire villages - on either side of the River Tywi - voted to switch to digital after taking part in a pilot scheme.

Homes were given digital receivers for each of their televisions. A helpline was set up for residents' teething problems, and one-to-one support was made available to the elderly.

After three months, the households were asked if they wanted to keep the digital services or revert to analogue only. More than 85% of households responded and 98% voted to retain the digital services. Hence at the end of March 2005, the analogue channels, BBC One Wales, ITV1 and S4C, radiating from the Ferryside transmitter, were switched off leaving BBC Two Wales as the only analogue channel remaining. Viewers wanted to keep this channel because it provided certain programmes that the digital equivalent, BBC 2W, did not show.

== Notable people ==
Ferryside Beach

Notable ex-residents of the village include the General Sir Thomas Picton of Iscoed Mansion, a former governor of Trinidad who died at the Battle of Waterloo, Hugh Williams, the 19th century Chartist lawyer who played a prominent role in the Rebecca Riots and the portrait and landscape painter Gordon Stuart (five of whose portraits can be found at the National Portrait Gallery, including those of Kingsley Amis, Dylan Thomas and Huw Wheldon). The parasitologist J. W. W. Stephens, FRS, was born in Ferryside in 1865. George Parry, a metallurgical engineer and prolific inventor of Ebbw Vale Steelworks retired to Ferryside in 1866 and died on 6 February 1873 at his residence Steel Villa.

Dylan Thomas was a regular visitor to Ferryside, both as a child and later when he lived in Laugharne. His maternal great-aunt, Amy, had married Captain David Jones, the Ferryside coxswain. They lived at Alpha House in Eva Terrace. Their son, David, ran the Dorothy Café next to the Ship Inn; he was followed there by his son, Raymond, who was Thomas’ second cousin. Thomas’ drinking in the White Lion, and his friendship with Dick Bright of 2, Neptune Villas, is described by Bright's niece, Beryl Hughes. Thomas' childhood holidays in Ferryside have been described by Stanford-ffoulkes, a descendant of Amy and David Jones.

Ferryside may have been an influence in the writing of Under Milk Wood. Llareggub's occupational profile as a town of seafarers, fishermen, cockle gatherers and farmers has been examined through an analysis of the returns in the 1939 War Register for Ferryside, comparing the town to New Quay, Laugharne and Llansteffan. This analysis also draws upon census returns and the Welsh Merchant Mariners Index. It shows that New Quay and Ferryside provide by far the best fit with Llareggub's occupational profile.
