= Wales (magazine) =

Wales was an English-language literary journal, published from 1937 to 1949 and from 1958 to 1960. The magazine contained fiction, poetry, reviews and articles pertaining to Wales.

The journal started as a quarterly publication (No. 1 (Summer 1937)-No. 11 (Winter 1939–1940)), became a Wartime Broadsheet (No. 1 (1941)), then moved to six-monthly publication (1943–1949). In 1958 it was restarted as a monthly publication with No. 32, ending with No. 47 in January 1960.

It was edited throughout its existence by Keidrych Rhys, and published on his behalf by The Druid Press, Carmarthen, and printed by Western Mail & Echo Ltd, and latterly by the Tudor Press, London.

The magazine was an important influence on Welsh literature. Robert Graves, who became a close correspondent with Rhys and Lynette Roberts, held high hopes for this magazine, which he felt could be a "record-vehicle" for a new movement of tradition-minded, modern Celtic poets.

In the Wales magazine, Rhys published articles, short stories, and poems by an array of predominantly Welsh writers and thinkers, such as Alun Lewis, Saunders Lewis, Dylan Thomas, Glyn Jones and Lynette Roberts. Early drafts of parts of Robert Graves's book on mythology and poetry, The White Goddess, were published there as three articles ('Dog', 'Roebuck' and 'Lapwing') between 1944 and 1945. John Cowper Powys who had moved to Corwen in 1935, strongly identifying with his Welsh ancestry, also contributed four articles celebrating Wales and Welsh mythology, and his belief that aboriginal "Welsh blood", derived from early Berber or Iberian settlers, was behind the unique "peculiarity" or cynneddf of the true Welsh identity. Ten of Powys's essays (including these Wales articles) were subsequently collected and published by Keidrych Rhys and Lynette Roberts' publishing house, The Druid Press, under the title Obstinate Cymric.

The magazine was a conscious attempt to provide a platform for 'younger progressive Welsh writers' who felt that their contribution to British culture was marginalised, and represented the creation of "Anglo-Welsh literature" (Welsh writing in English) as a concept.

The magazine has been digitised by the Welsh Journals Online project at the National Library of Wales.

== Other journals called Wales ==
- O. M. Edwards published the monthly magazine Wales as the English-language version of Cymru, 1894–1897.
- J. Hugh Edwards edited the monthly magazine Wales, 1911–1914.
