= Llansaint =

Village in Carmarthenshire, Wales

Coordinates: 51.7483°N 4.3409°W

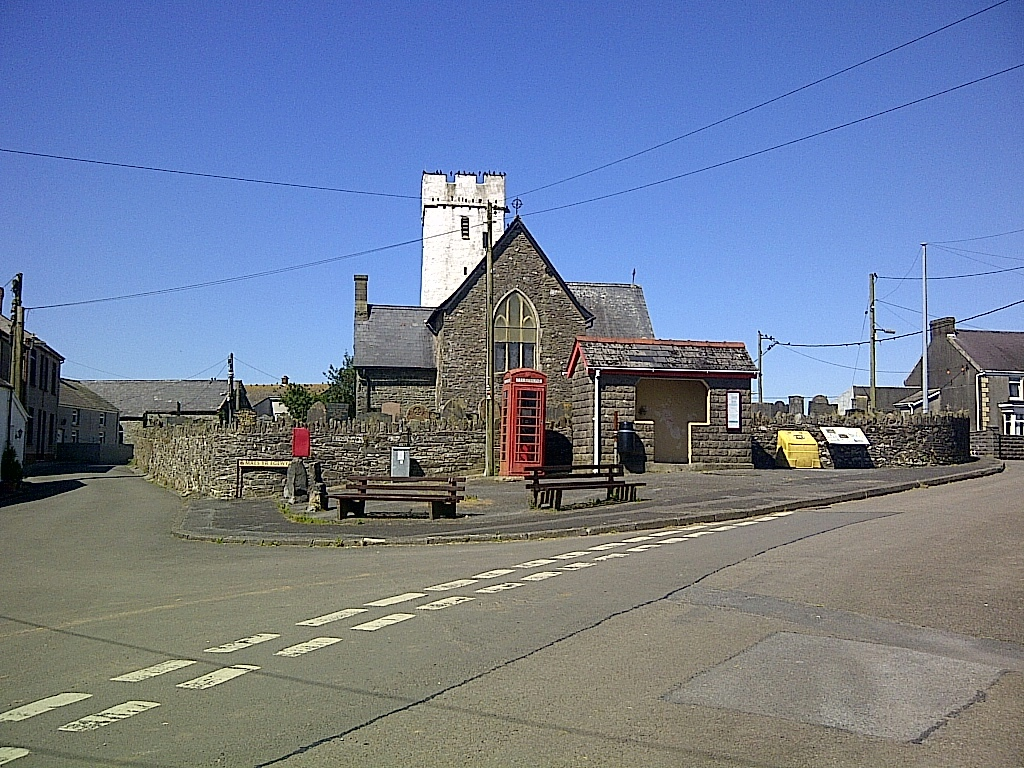
- Llansaint

- Location within Carmarthenshire
- OS grid reference: SN385081
- Community: St Ishmael
- Principal area: Carmarthenshire
- Preserved county: Dyfed
- Country: Wales
- Sovereign state: United Kingdom
- Post town: KIDWELLY
- Postcode district: SA17
- Dialling code: 01267
- Police: Dyfed-Powys
- Fire: Mid and West Wales
- Ambulance: Welsh
- UK Parliament: Llanelli
- Senedd Cymru – Welsh Parliament: Carmarthen East and Dinefwr

Llansaint is a village of farmsteads and cottages in Carmarthenshire, Wales. It includes a cluster of 19th century stone-built houses around the church, and is surrounded by farmsteads and modern residential development.

== History ==
=== Early settlement ===
On Allt Cunedda, a hill about a mile north of the village, are Bronze Age burial mounds found during an excavation in the 1850s. Findings included a skeleton and remains of an Iron Age fort. Other evidence of human settlement is inscriptions made into stone walls.

The village of Llansaint developed around a cemetery in the 5th and 6th centuries. The holy well of Ffynnonsaint, close to the current location of the Tabor chapel and Jinni Will well in the Cwm valley, indicates an early Christian settlement. The church was built in the 12th century, and a tower was added in the 14th century. Two early Christian monuments of Ogham stones are embedded in the south eastern external wall and commemorate two 6th century Irish priests named Cimestle Avicat and Vennestl.

=== Llansaint ===
Up until the 17th century Llansaint was known as Halkenchurche meaning church of the saints.

In the 18th century Pengay Farm was the seat of Bevan family, prominent supporters of Methodism who introduced improved agricultural methods. Although the present house and farm buildings are 18th century, the arched gateway contains a 1760 bell from a wrecked Dutch ship.

In 1896 the "Silver band", who won national competitions, was well respected in the community. The band continued until the early 1990s, and yet the musical tradition continues with many former band members and youngsters providing musical entertainment for the community.

During World War II, Llansaint was one of the villages that took in evacuated children from London and other areas.

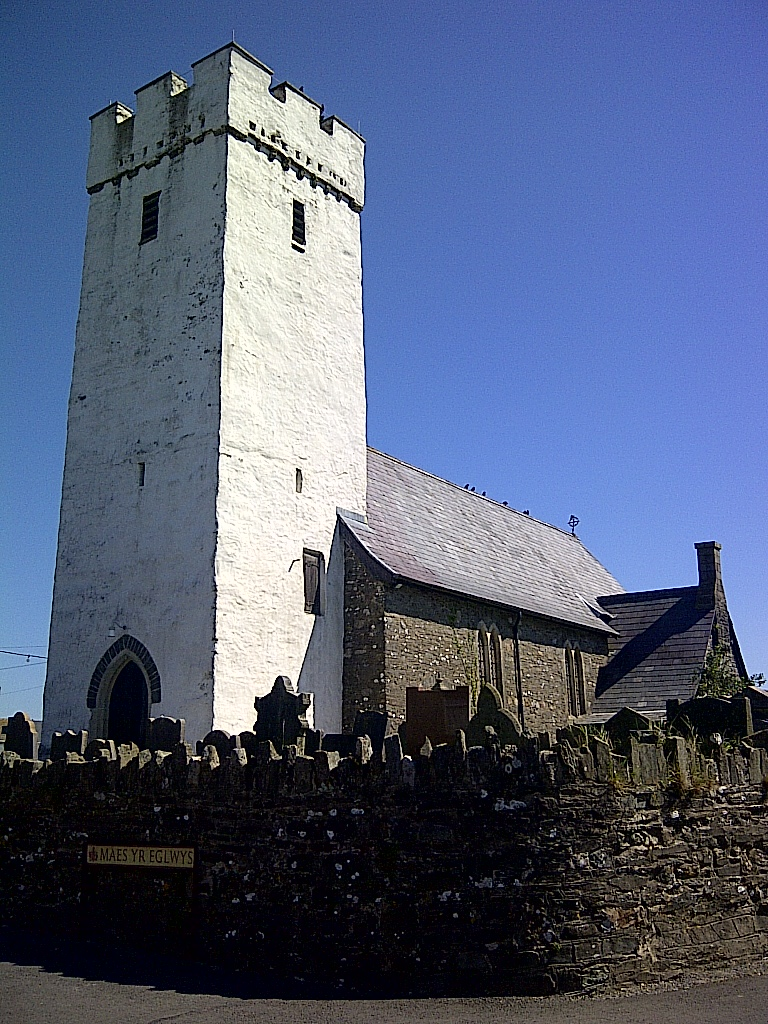
All Saints Church Tower

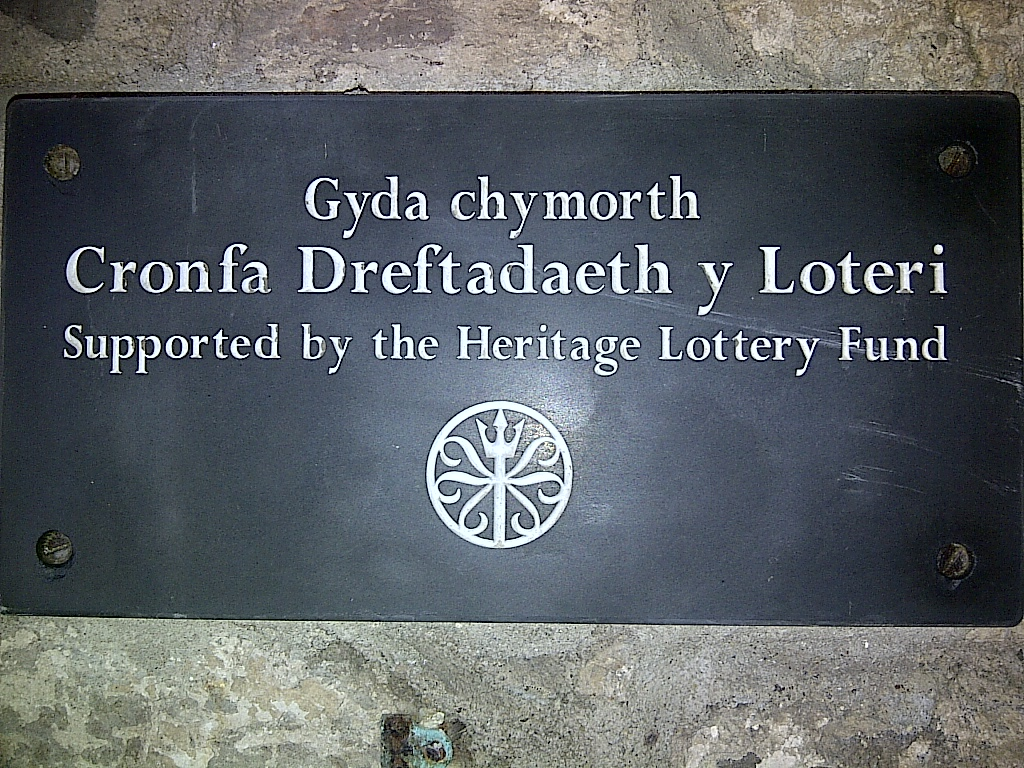
Supported by the Heritage Lottery Fund

== Government ==
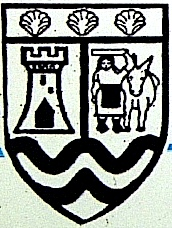
Village Crest

Llansaint is governed on a local level by Carmarthenshire County Council and on a community level by St. Ishmael's Community.

== Economy ==
=== Cockle harvesting ===
Cockles were harvested for centuries by women to supplement their families' income. Once the cockles were gathered and bagged, they were transported on donkeys to the Ferryside railway station, a 2-hour round trip. The arduous work was in addition to the care they gave their families and home. Their husbands worked in the mines, at the brickworks or on the land. Women's harvesting of cockles ended in 1973.

In 1900 the author H. C. Tierney wrote: "Llansaint... a place inhabited for generations by a somewhat primitive and exceedingly hardy race of people who live by gathering shellfish, especially cockles. The trade is almost entirely in the hands of the women, often assisted by children. The business seems to pay them remarkably well... there is some truth in the old saying, so well known in St. Ishmael's parish, that 'he who marries a Llansaint woman marries a fortune'."

=== Current industries ===
Today the primary industries are cattle and sheep farming, fishing, and tourism.

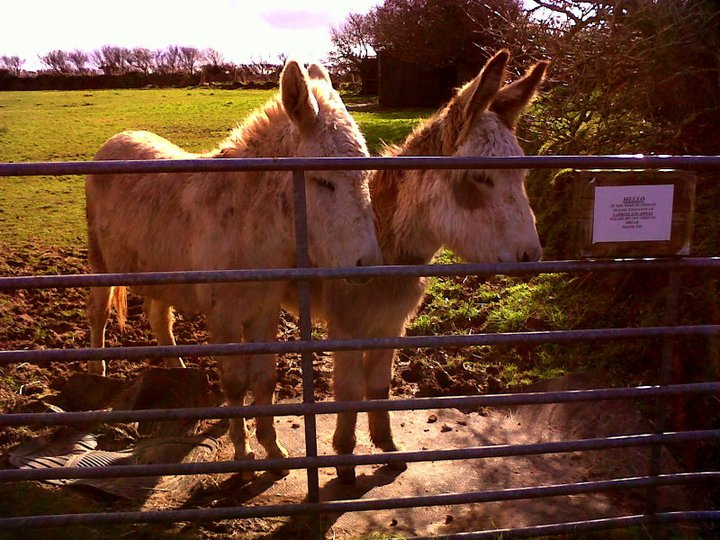
Llansaint Donkeys

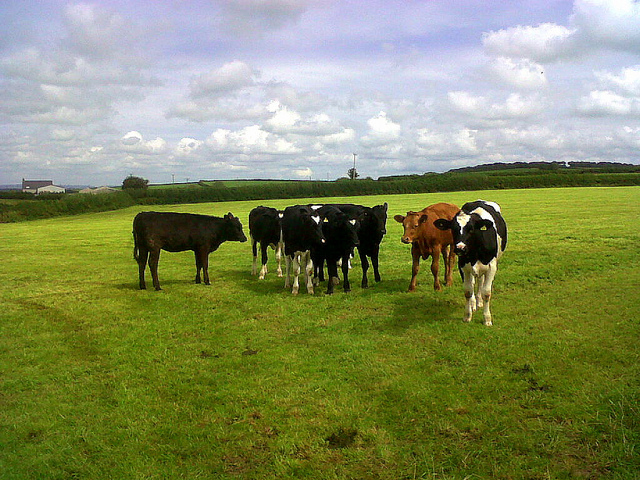
Cattle Farming

== Demographics ==
Welsh and English are spoken in Llansaint.

=== Religion ===
The area religious institutions are Christian. Within the foreignry of St Ishmael to the west, a nucleation around Llansaint Church - which occupies a distinct, central location within the village - lies at the focus of a number of roads within a discrete area of former field strips. The Medieval All Saints Church, Llansaint, with a landmark tower, is Grade B listed.

== Community services and amenities ==
Buses run through the village regularly. Children are transported by school bus to the Ysgol Y Fro school for their education. To support the villages literary needs, there is a mobile library service that comes to the village every month. Nearby St Ishmael's community magazine is STISH.

The village has a camera club and a garden club. A Women's Institutes (WI] group meets regularly. There is one pub in the village - The King's Arms. Carmarthen Bay Holiday Park is next to the village. There is a former smithy in Llansaint, and two pounds.

The Llansaint Carnival is held annually in July in the park next to the village hall.

== Notable people ==
- Thomas Gerald Reames Davies CBE (born 7 February 1945 in Llansaint) was a Welsh rugby player, playing for the side between 1966 and 1978.

== Gallery ==
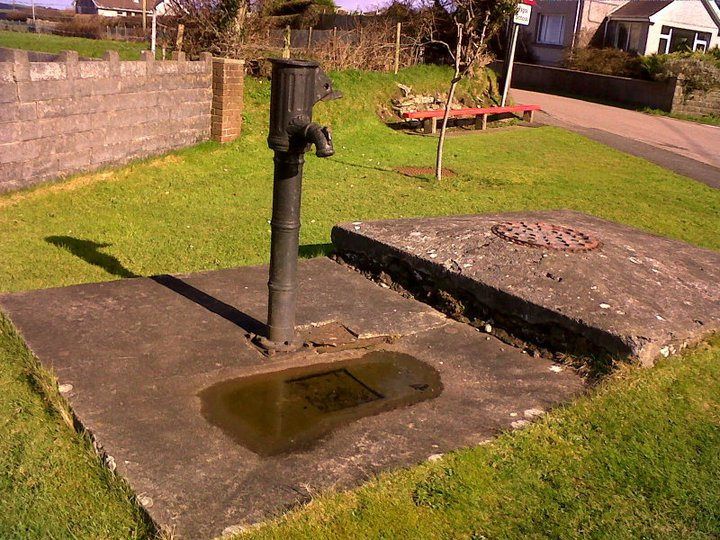
Old village pump

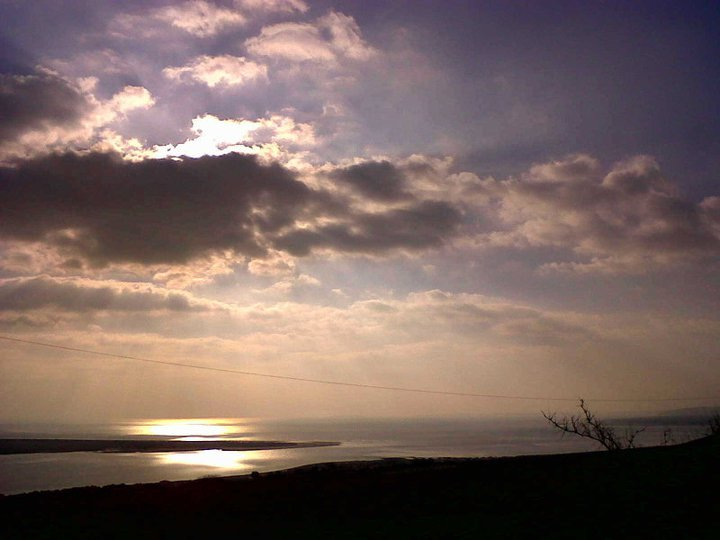
Overlooking Carmarthen Bay

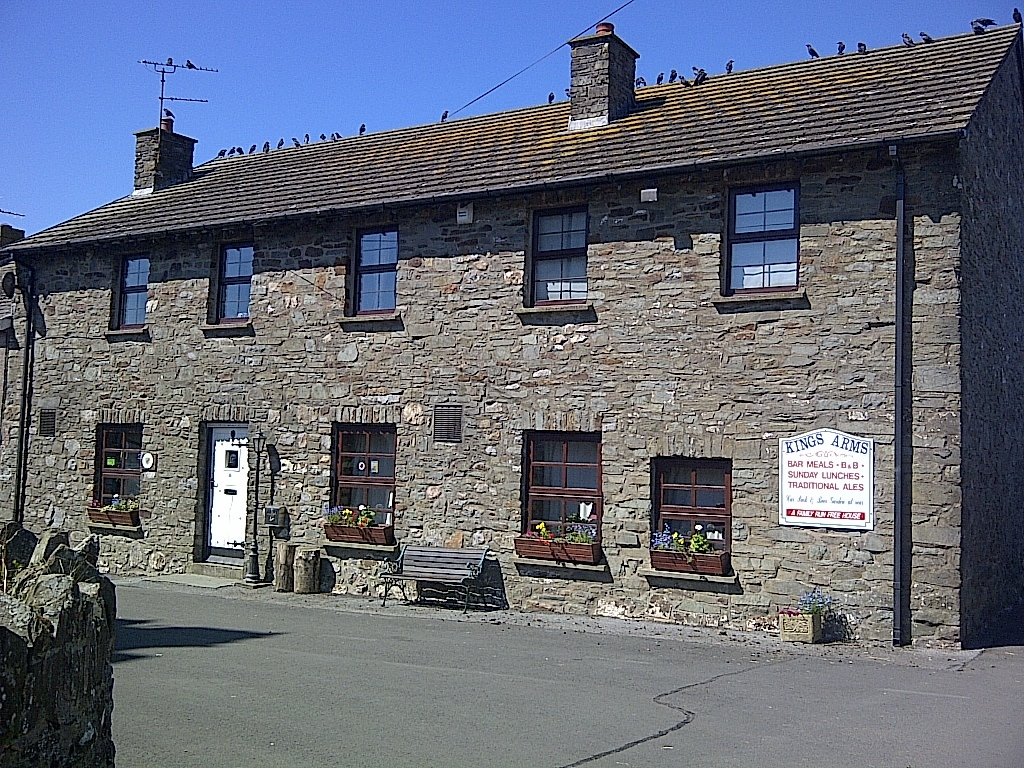
King's Arms Inn

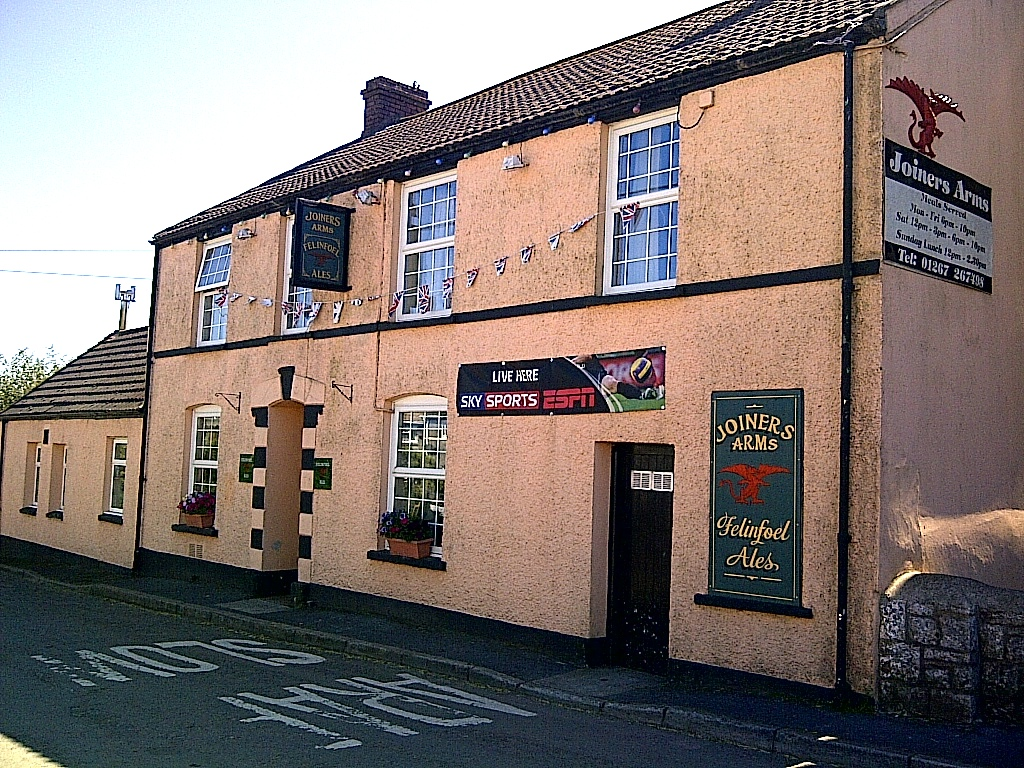
Joiners Arms (closed 2016)
