= Llangain =

Village and community in Carmarthenshire, Wales

Llangain: Welsh: Llan-gain
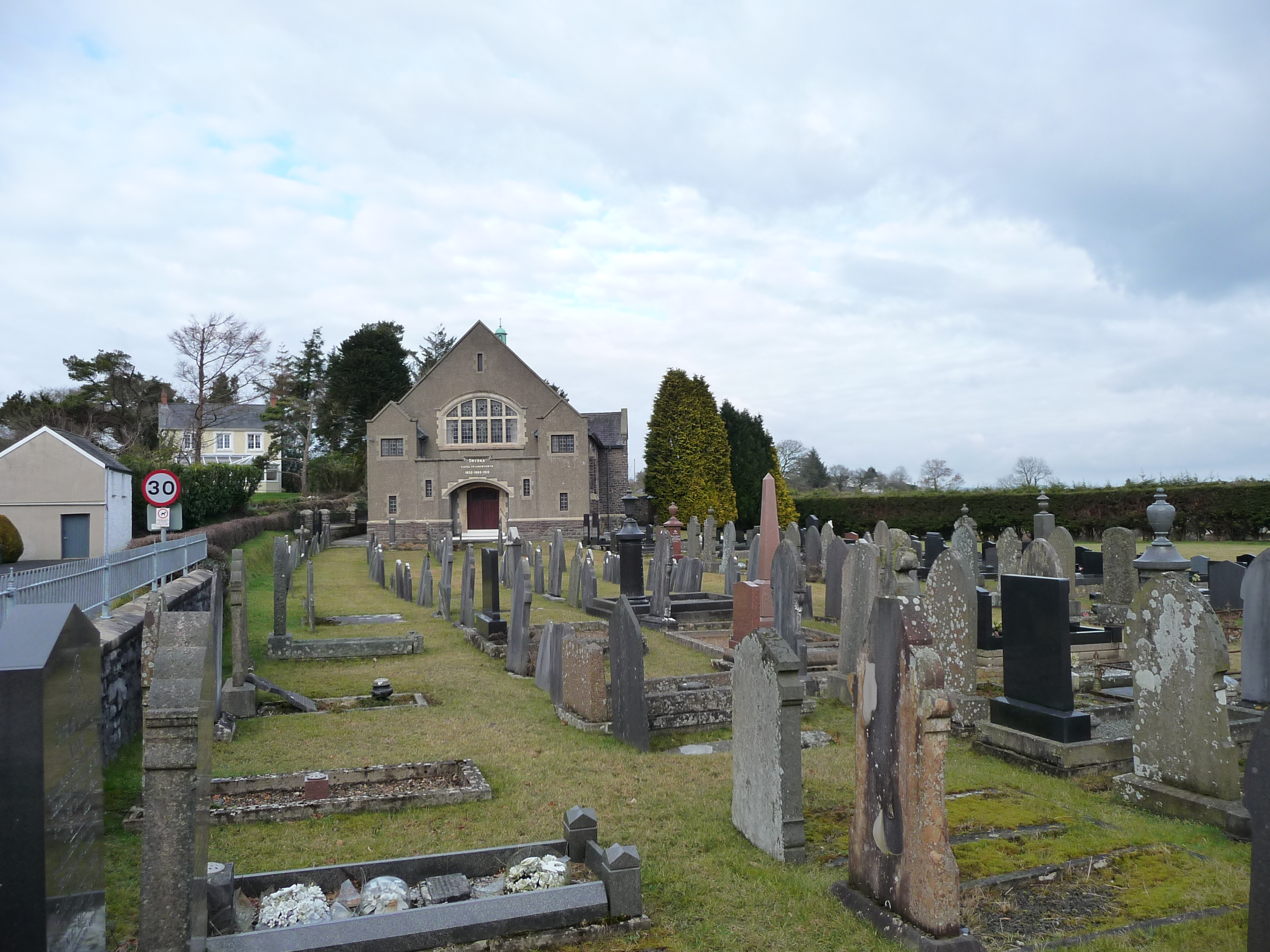
- Capel Smyrna, Llangain

- Location within Carmarthenshire
- Population: 573 (2011 Census)
- OS grid reference: SN385155
- Community: Llangain
- Principal area: Carmarthenshire
- Preserved county: Dyfed
- Country: Wales
- Sovereign state: United Kingdom
- Post town: CARMARTHEN
- Postcode district: SA33
- Dialling code: 01267
- Police: Dyfed-Powys
- Fire: Mid and West Wales
- Ambulance: Welsh
- UK Parliament: Caerfyrddin
- Senedd Cymru – Welsh Parliament: Carmarthen West and South Pembrokeshire
- List of places UK Wales Carmarthenshire 51.814733°N 4.344321°W Map of the community

Llangain is a village and community in Carmarthenshire, in the south-west of Wales. Located to the west of the River Towy, and south of the town of Carmarthen, the community contains three standing stones, and two chambered tombs as well as the ruins of 15th century great house, Castell Moel. In 2001 the community's population was recorded at 574, decreasing slightly to 573 at the 2011 census.

== Location ==
Situated near the bank of the Afon Tywi, the parish extends from near Johnstown to Llansteffan in one direction and from Llangynog to the river in another and consists of very pleasant countryside with gentle hills reaching 350 ft/105m (Trig Point) and stretches of woodlands. The parish encloses an area of almost 3,000 acres (12 km^{2}). Prehistory There are a few cromlechs or dolmens, the best examples being Meini Llwydion (Greystones) and Merlin's Quoits. They were communal burial places for family groups dating back to the Neolithic period (c.3000 BC).

The community is bordered by the communities of: Carmarthen; Llandyfaelog; Llansteffan; and Llangynog, all being in Carmarthenshire.

== Education ==
In 1846 the only school was a Sunday School. Llangain Board School was built in 1875 and officially opened in 1876, and was in use until superseded by the new school in 1977, to which only about 30-35 children go. There was an after school club but it closed down because not enough children went.

== Religion ==
The present church of St Cain was built in 1871. There is a tiled mural on either side of the altar in memory of the Gwyn family of Pilroath and Plas Cwrthir. An Elizabethan chalice is dated 1576.

Capel Smyrna, a congregational chapel, is a prominent landmark within the parish. Originally built in 1835, it was rebuilt in 1865 and restored in 1915. The white building provided stabling for horses during chapel services. The loft served as the vestry.

== Notable buildings ==
Castell Moel (Green Castle) is a local landmark at the sharp bend on the B4312. The ruins of the impressive, late medieval residence still stand. It was never a castle but a residence built for the Reed family in the early 15th century and was in ruin in Elizabethan times. It is possible there had been some earthen fortification there at one time. Some believe this to be at Old Castle. Doubtless this would have been a motte and bailey. Until recent times ships used to lie at anchor below to off load onto lighter vessels for transport to Carmarthen.

Coedmor was built in 1968 for Mr and Mrs E.J.Williams, retired farmers of Penycoed. Coedmor Avenue is named in recognition of their ownership of the land and the family's continuing local connection.

Bwthyn-y-Felin is an old woollen mill which employed four full-time workers in its heyday. Llangain Mill closed in the 1940s.

Llwyndu mansion, a Grade II listed building, was built in the early 19th century. In 1821-1823 Captain Henry Harding lived there and it was afterwards the home of Frederick Philipps, JP. In 1906 the owner was Charles Bankes Davies. It has an upper and lower lodge. The original name for the upper lodge The Beeches, was Chweched meaning Sixth, indicating the six lanes. The main mansion building was largely destroyed by fire in June 2015 with only the front and side elevations remaining.

Pilroath mansion is situated at the southern end of the parish above the confluence of the Rhoth Brook and the Afon Tywi. In 1902 the property was purchased by T J Harries, Esq. who built the present mansion. The property was occupied by the Harries family for three generations and owned until 1994 by County Councillor Arthur Harries, in which year it was purchased by David Lyn, who converted the courtyard and outbuildings into a production base where films and TV programmes reflecting local life were made.

Fernhill, a small gentry house dating back to 1723 and listed as a grade II building for its architectural and cultural connections. Famous as a frequent childhood holiday retreat of the world-renowned poet Dylan Thomas (1914–1953), it became immortalised in one of his best-known poems, Fern Hill. Fernhill is also known for its association with the notorious county hangman, Robert Rickets Evans who lived there at the turn of the 20th century. His daughter was heiress to a fortune. He imprisoned her in a cell in the courtyard (which can still be seen today) to gain her fortune, but her lover helped her to escape, according to folklore. The story has been confirmed in more recent research, which has also described Thomas' stays at Fernhill and the extent of his family connections in the Llangain area.

Pantydderwen was a small cottage originally and once housed the Post Office and local sweet shop. It became a public house c.1979. The golf course opened in 1993.

Pantyrathro mansion was built by James Richards in the early 19th century. It was developed as a direct result of selling local milk products to London with the coming of the railway to Carmarthen. It became a local hotel in 1970.
