= Llansteffan =

Village and community in Carmarthenshire, Wales

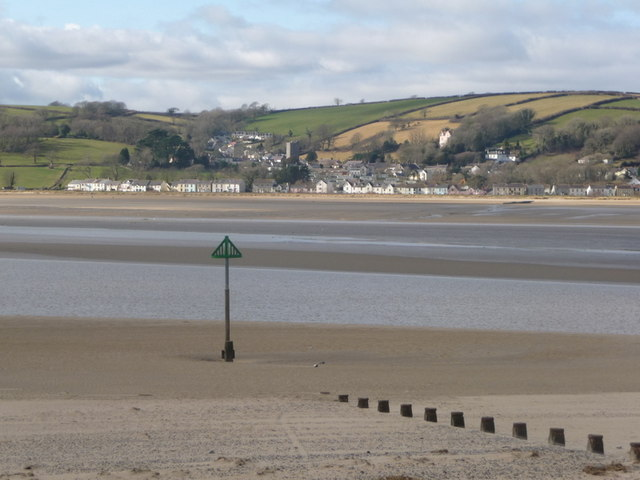
- Llansteffan viewed from Ferryside

- Location within Carmarthenshire
- Population: 941
- OS grid reference: SN351108
- Community: Llansteffan
- Principal area: Carmarthenshire
- Preserved county: Dyfed
- Country: Wales
- Sovereign state: United Kingdom
- Post town: CARMARTHEN
- Postcode district: SA33
- Dialling code: 01267
- Police: Dyfed-Powys
- Fire: Mid and West Wales
- Ambulance: Welsh
- UK Parliament: Caerfyrddin
- Senedd Cymru – Welsh Parliament: Carmarthen West and South Pembrokeshire
- List of places UK Wales Carmarthenshire 51.772129°N 4.3910444°W Map of the community

Llansteffan is a village and community situated on the south coast of Carmarthenshire, Wales, lying on the estuary of the River Tywi, 7 miles (11 km) south of Carmarthen.

== Description ==
The community includes Llanybri and is bordered by the communities of: Laugharne Township; Llangynog; Llangain; St Ishmael; and Pembrey and Burry Port Town. The population of the community was 941 in 2011 which includes the Llansteffan village population of 424.

Llansteffan means "Llan of Saint Stephen", but honours a 6th-century Welsh associate of Saint Teilo rather than the more widely known protomartyr.

Between the castle and village sits Plas Llanstephan, Lord Kylsant's former residence, which is a grade II* listed building

== Castle ==
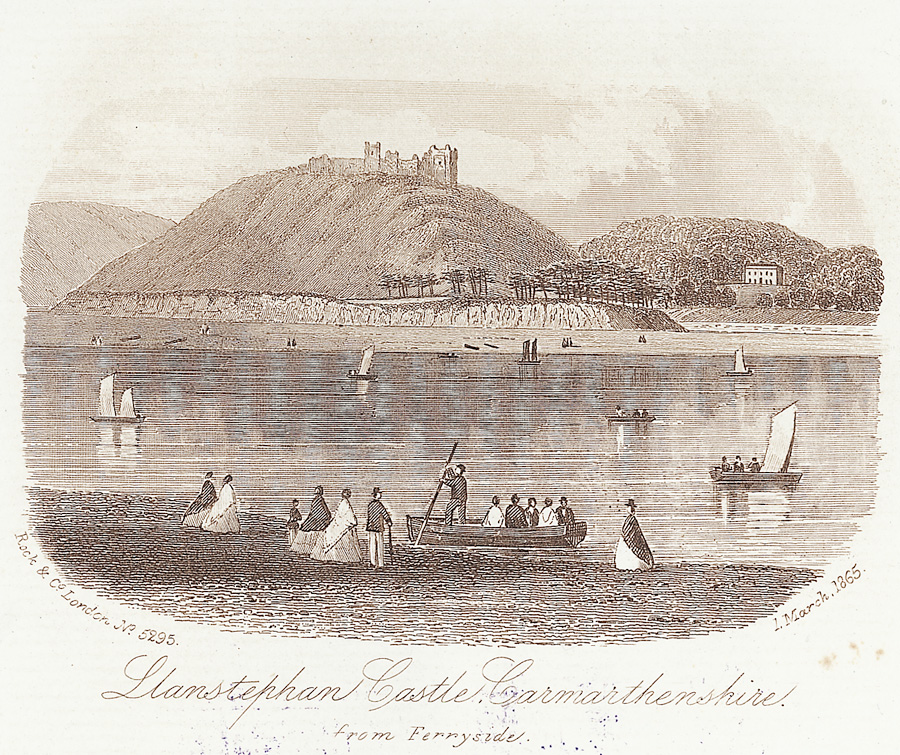
Llansteffan Castle (1865 engraving)

Llansteffan Castle, built by the Normans in the 12th century and granted to the Marmion family, stands above the village on a promontory commanding the estuary passage. Located between the ferry crossing-points of the Tywi and Tâf rivers, Llansteffan was an important staging post on the coastal route from Glamorgan via Kidwelly to Pembroke.

== Churches ==
The parish of Llansteffan consists of two distinct villages with separate churches: Llansteffan by the estuary and Llanybri inland on the hilltop.

Churches in the village of Llansteffan: St Ystyffan's (or St Stephen) Church, Bethany Welsh Baptist Church, Bethel Welsh Independent Chapel, Moreia Welsh Calvinistic Methodist Chapel, and Wesleyan Methodist Chapel.

See also: Churches in the village of Llanybri.

=== St Ystyffan's Church ===
St Ystyffan's Church is an Anglican church in a grade II* listed building. The church was founded in c. 650 and rebuilt in c. 1112 by the Normans. It was expanded from the 13th to the 16th centuries with the addition of transepts, a porch and a tower. It was restored in the 19th century, including a new set of 8 bells and an organ. Stained glass windows designed by John Petts, who lived locally, were added in the late 20th century.

=== Bethany Welsh Baptist Church ===
Bethany Baptist Chapel in Llansteffan in 2021

Bethany Baptist Church was originally built in 1833. It was rebuilt in 1866 and enlarged in 1896. It is located on Water Street. Rev. Harding Rees (1889 – 1966) was ordained as the minister of Bethany Baptist Church in September 1922, which he remained until his retirement in 1946.

=== Bethel Welsh Independent Chapel ===
Bethel was a Welsh Independent Chapel on Bethel Terrace. It was built 1865, with modifications in 1879. The chapel closed in c. 1995 and the building is unused.

=== Moreia Welsh Calvinistic Methodist Chapel ===
Moreia (or Moriah) is a Welsh Calvinistic Methodist Chapel on Old School Road. It was originally built in 1804 and then rebuilt in 1837, in 1871, and in 1910 to the design of architect John Howard Morgan of Carmarthen.

=== Wesleyan Methodist Chapel ===
Llansteffan's Wesleyan Methodist Chapel was on Old Road. It was built in 1808 and rebuilt in 1859.

== Ferry Crossing ==
The village was connected to Ferryside, on the opposite bank of the Towy estuary, by a ferry until the 1950s. It saved visitors a 16-mile road trip.

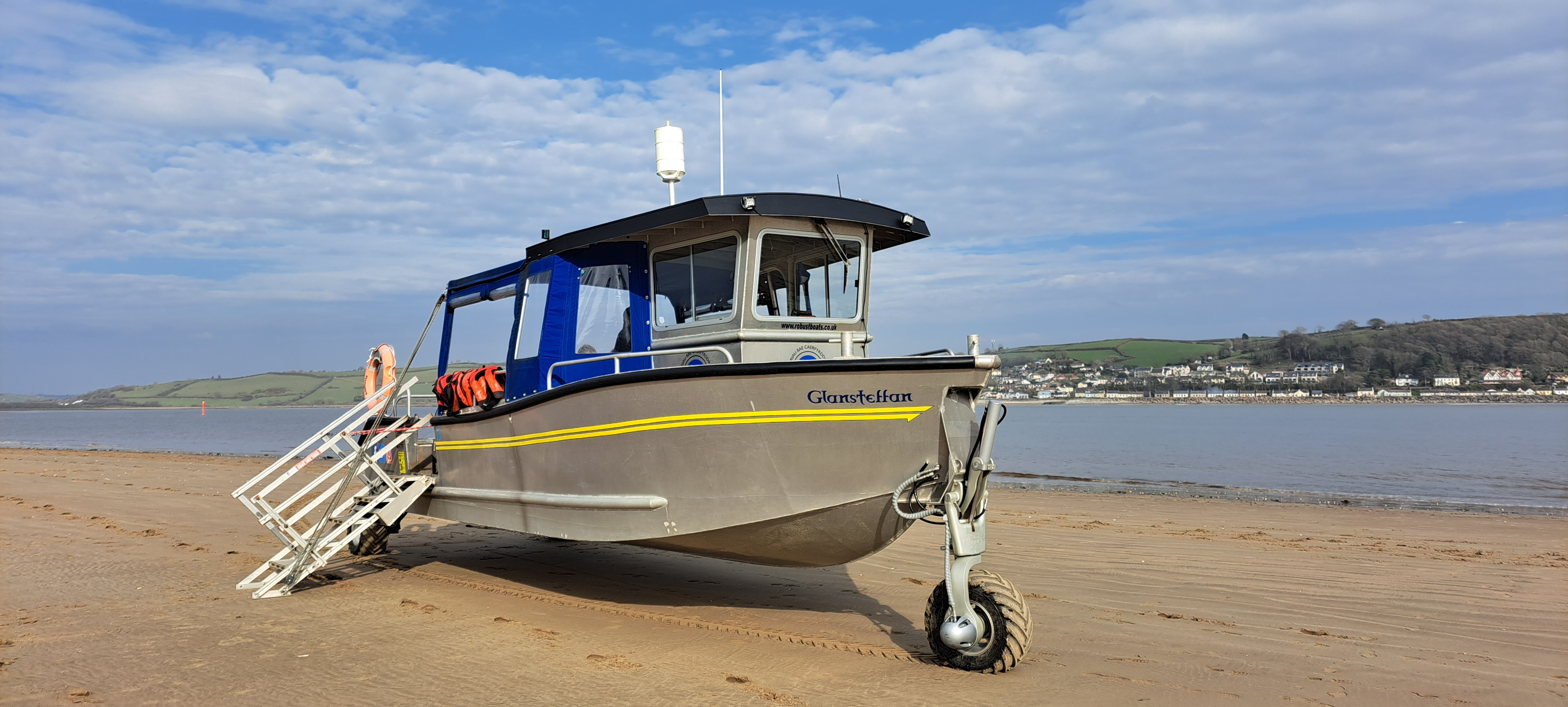
The new ferry, Glansteffan

In 2018, a ferry service resumed using an amphibious boat to negotiate Llansteffan beach by Carmarthen Bay Ferries using a customized Sealegs Amphibious Craft offering 5-10 minute crossings to Llansteffan and 45 minute estuary and 1 hour trips, having received a grant of £300,000 from the Coastal Communities Fund. The grant had been applied for by a former resident of the community, Professor Kenton Morgan and local reactions to the service and the culture of grantsmanship was covered in a BBC Radio 4 programme.

== Governance ==
At the local level, Llansteffan is governed by Llansteffan & Llanybri Community Council comprising up to 10 community councillors.

Until 2022 a county electoral ward of Llansteffan existed. This ward stretched north from Llansteffan to include Llangynog and Llangain, with a total population of 2,006. From the 2022 local elections Llansteffan was merged with the St Clears ward to become 'St Clears and Llansteffan', represented by two county councillors.

== The Mock Mayor ==
The Mock mayor making is a tradition observed in Llansteffan since at least 1875, where an individual is made mayor for a year on a manifesto of absurd promises. Promises include constructing a bridge crossing the Tywi River to Ferryside, stocking the bay with mermaids to attract working age bachelors to the village, and a cow in every garden to supply milk.

Originally the mayor was elected at Michaelmas as part of celebrations after the Michaelmas tax was paid by local farmers. Later, at its height, the mayor making was incorporated into the village's annual festivities held during the Miner's Fortnight when huge crowds of visitors came to Llansteffan and elections were held on the first Thursday of August in the Sticks Forest below Llansteffan Castle.

The Mock Mayor is formally disrobed prior the hustings where the “Clapometer” gauges the level of audience approval, with the winner being enrobed at the end of the evening.

Throughout the year the Mock Mayor typically organises and informally attends local functions and events. This role is entirely ceremonial and community lead with no official authority or recognition, primarily serving as a source of entertainment and social cohesion.

== Notable people ==
- The poet Dylan Thomas had strong family links to Llansteffan. The triangle formed by Llangynog, Llangain and Llansteffan constitutes, as Thomas once put it, his "breeding-box valley". His mother's family, the Williamses, lived within this triangle in farms such as Waunfwlchan, Llwyngwyn, Maesgwyn and Penycoed. His mother's half-sister, Anne, lived in Rose Cottage in the village.
- Sir John Williams, 1st Baronet, of the City of London.
- John and Kusha Petts, artists and creators of the Wales Window for Alabama.
- Mary Keir, district nurse and Wales' oldest person for three years.
- Keidrych Rhys and Lynette Roberts, husband and wife poets who married in Llansteffan Church and lived in Llanybri.
- The artist Osi Rhys Osmond, lived in Llansteffan for 30 years until his death.
- Lieutenant Tomos Stephens, an SAS soldier who was taken prisoner during Operation Bulbasket in World War II, then beaten to death by a German officer.
- Hannah Dingley, the first female manager of a men's professional football team in English football, the Forest Green Rovers F.C.

== See also ==
- Llanybri
- Maurice FitzGerald, Lord of Lanstephan
