= Ferryside railway station =

Railway station in Carmarthenshire, Wales

Ferryside Welsh: Glanyfferi
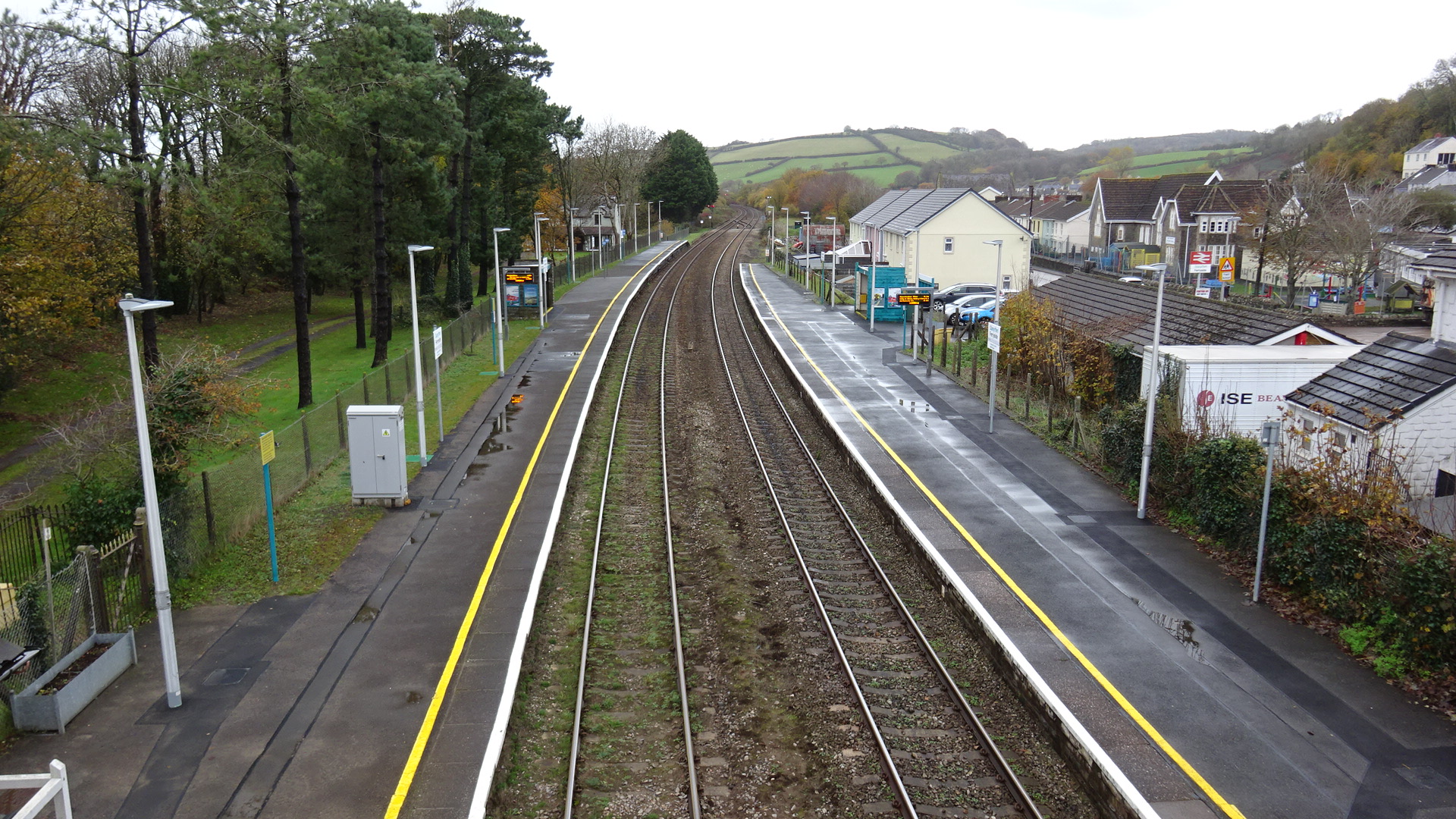

General information
- Location: Ferryside, Carmarthenshire; Wales
- Coordinates: 51.768°N 4.369°W
- Grid reference: SN366104
- Manager: Transport for Wales
- Platforms: 2

Other information
- Station code: FYS
- Classification: DfT category F2

Passengers
- 2021/22: ▲19,056
- 2022/23: ▼14,838
- 2023/24: ▼13,840
- 2024/25: ▲16,476
- 2025/26: ▲18,946
Location
Notes
- Passenger statistics from the Office of Rail and Road

Ferryside railway station serves the seaside village of Ferryside, Carmarthenshire, Wales. The station was opened by the South Wales Railway on 11 October 1852 and is now an unstaffed stop. It is 238 miles 51 chains (384.0 km) from the zero point at London Paddington, measured via Stroud.

There is a level crossing near the station as well as a manually operated signal box, which in 2016 was listed as being due for computerisation. The 1905 Ordnance Survey map shows the presence of a goods shed with a single line running through it and points at either side leading on to the main line. In July 2015, the Welsh Government funded the installation of reinforced glass fibre 'humps' on the platforms to improve access for wheelchair and pushchair users onto and off trains.

== Services ==
There is a basic two-hourly service in each direction (with extras at peak periods). Many westbound trains terminate at Carmarthen, but a few continue to either Milford Haven or Pembroke Dock in the morning and late afternoon. Most eastbound trains continue beyond Swansea to Cardiff Central, Hereford and Manchester Piccadilly. Services are less frequent on Sundays.

Preceding station	National Rail	Following station
Kidwelly	Transport for Wales; West Wales line	Carmarthen

== References in popular culture ==
Ferryside station was featured in the Channel 4 series Paul Merton's Secret Stations Season 1 Episode 2 broadcast on 8 May 2016. This series features British comedian Paul Merton visiting various request stop railway stations around Britain.
