= Alun Lewis (poet) =

Welsh poet

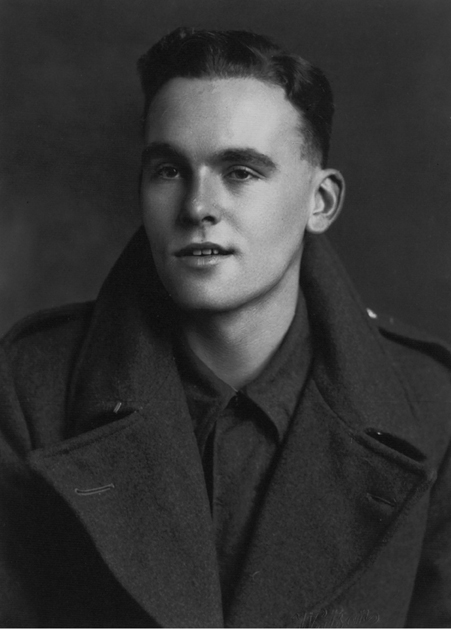
- Born: 1 July 1915; Cwmaman, Wales
- Died: 5 March 1944 (aged 28); Burma
- Occupations: Writer, teacher, soldier
- Spouse: Gweno Lewis (m. 1941, died)
- Writing career
- Period: 1942–1944
- Notable works: Raiders' Dawn and other poems (1942)

Alun Lewis (1 July 1915 – 5 March 1944) was a Welsh poet. He is one of the best-known English-language war poets of the Second World War. His poetry centres around a "recurring obsession with the themes of isolation and death."

== Life and work ==
Alun Lewis, was born on 1 July 1915 at Cwmaman, near Aberdare in the Cynon Valley of the South Wales Coalfields. His parents, Thomas John and Gwladys Lewis, were school teachers at Llanwern; and he had a younger sister, Mair and two brothers. By the time he won a scholarship to attend Cowbridge Grammar School, he was already interested in writing. He went on to study at Aberystwyth University and the University of Manchester. Although he was born in South Wales, he wrote in English only.

Lewis was unsuccessful as a journalist and instead earned his living as a supply teacher. He met the poet Lynette Roberts (whose poem "Llanybri" is an invitation to him to visit her home), even though she was married to another poet, Keidrych Rhys. In 1939, Lewis met Gweno Meverid Ellis, a teacher, whom he married on 5 July 1941.

After the outbreak of the Second World War Lewis first joined the British Army's Royal Engineers as a Private because he was a pacifist, but still wanted to fight fascism. However, he then inexplicably sought and gained a commission in an infantry battalion. In 1941 he collaborated with artists John Petts and Brenda Chamberlain on the "Caseg broadsheets". His first published book was the poetry collection Raider's Dawn and other poems (1942), which was followed by a volume of short stories, The Last Inspection (1942). In 1942 he was sent to India with the 6th battalion South Wales Borderers.

Lewis's poems about his war experiences have been described as showing "his brooding over his army experiences and trying to catch and hold some vision that would illuminate its desolation with meaning" (see Ian Hamilton "Alun Lewis Selected Poetry and Prose) Scholars have noted the thematic and formal influence of Edward Thomas on his work—Lewis's poem "To Edward Thomas" is dedicated to the poet.

Lewis died on 5 March 1944 during the Burma campaign against the Imperial Japanese Army. He was found shot in the head, after shaving and washing, near the officers' latrines, with his revolver in his hand, and died from his wound six hours later. Despite it being a case of suicide, a court of inquiry charitably concluded that he had tripped and that the shooting was an accident. He is buried at Taukkyan War Cemetery.

His second book of poems, Ha! Ha! Among the Trumpets. Poems in Transit, was published in 1945, and his Letters from India in 1946. Several collections of his poems, letters and stories have been published subsequently.

== Works ==
- Raiders' Dawn and other poems (1942)
- The Last Inspection and other stories (1942)

Posthumous releases and compilations

- Ha! Ha! Among the Trumpets. Poems in Transit (1945)
- Letters from India, edited by Gweno Lewis & Gwyn Jones (1946)
- In the Green Tree (letters & stories) (1948)
- Selected Poetry and Prose, edited by Ian Hamilton (1966)
- Selected Poems of Alun Lewis, edited by Jeremy Hooker and Gweno Lewis (1981)
- Alun Lewis. A Miscellany of His Writings, edited by John Pikoulis (1982)
- Letters to My Wife, edited by Gweno Lewis (Seren Books: 1989)
- Collected Stories, edited by Cary Archard (Seren Books, 1990)
- Collected Poems, edited by Cary Archard (Seren Books, 1994)
- A Cypress Walk. Letters to 'Frieda', with a memoir by Freda Aykroyd (Enitharmon Press, 2006)

== Biography ==
- Alun Lewis. A Life by John Pikoulis (Seren Books, 1991)
- Poet in Khaki: Alun Lewis and his Combat Writings by Pinaki Roy, War, Literature and the Arts, Vol. 24, No. 1, 2012–13: Wayback Machine
