= Keidrych Rhys =

Welsh literary journalist, editor and poet

William Ronald Rhys Jones (26 December 1915 – 22 May 1987), who used the name Keidrych Rhys, was a Welsh literary journalist and editor, and a poet. He was editor of the periodical, Wales, published from 1937 to 1949 and from 1958 to 1960.

== Biography ==
William Ronald Rhys Jones was born in Wales in 1915, at Bethlehem, Carmarthenshire.

In 1937 he began the publication of the literary periodical, Wales. He remained editor of the periodical throughout its life, from 1937 to 1949 and from 1958 to 1960.

in 1939 he married the poet Lynette Roberts. Throughout the 1940s they lived at Llanybri, Carmarthenshire, and had two children: their daughter, Angharad (born 1945) and their son, Pridein (born 1946). During this period Faber published his collection of poems, The Van Pool (1942) and his wife's Poems (1944).

In 1949 he and his wife divorced. In that year publication of the periodical, Wales, was discontinued, and did not resume until 1958, by which time Rhys was living in London.

He lived at Penybont farm, Llangadock, Carmarthen.

He died on 22 May 1987. An archive of his manuscripts is held at the National Library of Wales in Aberystwyth. Photographic portraits of Rhys by Howard Coster and Ida Kar are held by the National Portrait Gallery, London.

== Wales magazine ==
See main article Wales (magazine)

From 1937 to 1949 and from 1958 to 1960 his editorship of the magazine, Wales, made it a channel for English-language writing in Wales. In the magazine Rhys published articles, stories and poems by Welsh writers or writers involved with Wales, such as Alun Lewis, Saunders Lewis, Dylan Thomas, Glyn Jones and Lynette Roberts. The magazine was an attempt to provide a platform for "younger progressive Welsh writers" who felt that their contribution to British culture was marginalised, and contributed to the creation of the concept of Anglo-Welsh literature or Welsh writing in English.

The poet Robert Graves wrote to Rhys and Lynette Roberts that he hoped that the periodical Wales might be a 'record-vehicle' for a new movement of tradition-minded yet modern Celtic poets. Drafts of parts of his book on mythology, The White Goddess, were published there in 1944 and 1945 as three articles, 'Dog', 'Roebuck' and 'Lapwing'.

The magazine is being digitized by the Welsh Journals Online project at the National Library of Wales.
