= Llansteffan Castle =

Castle in Carmarthenshire, Wales

Coordinates: 51.7656°N 4.3906°W

- Castell Llansteffan (Welsh) (Note: Since 2024, Cadw, who hold the guardianship of the site, use the Welsh name only.)
- Llansteffan, Carmarthenshire, Wales
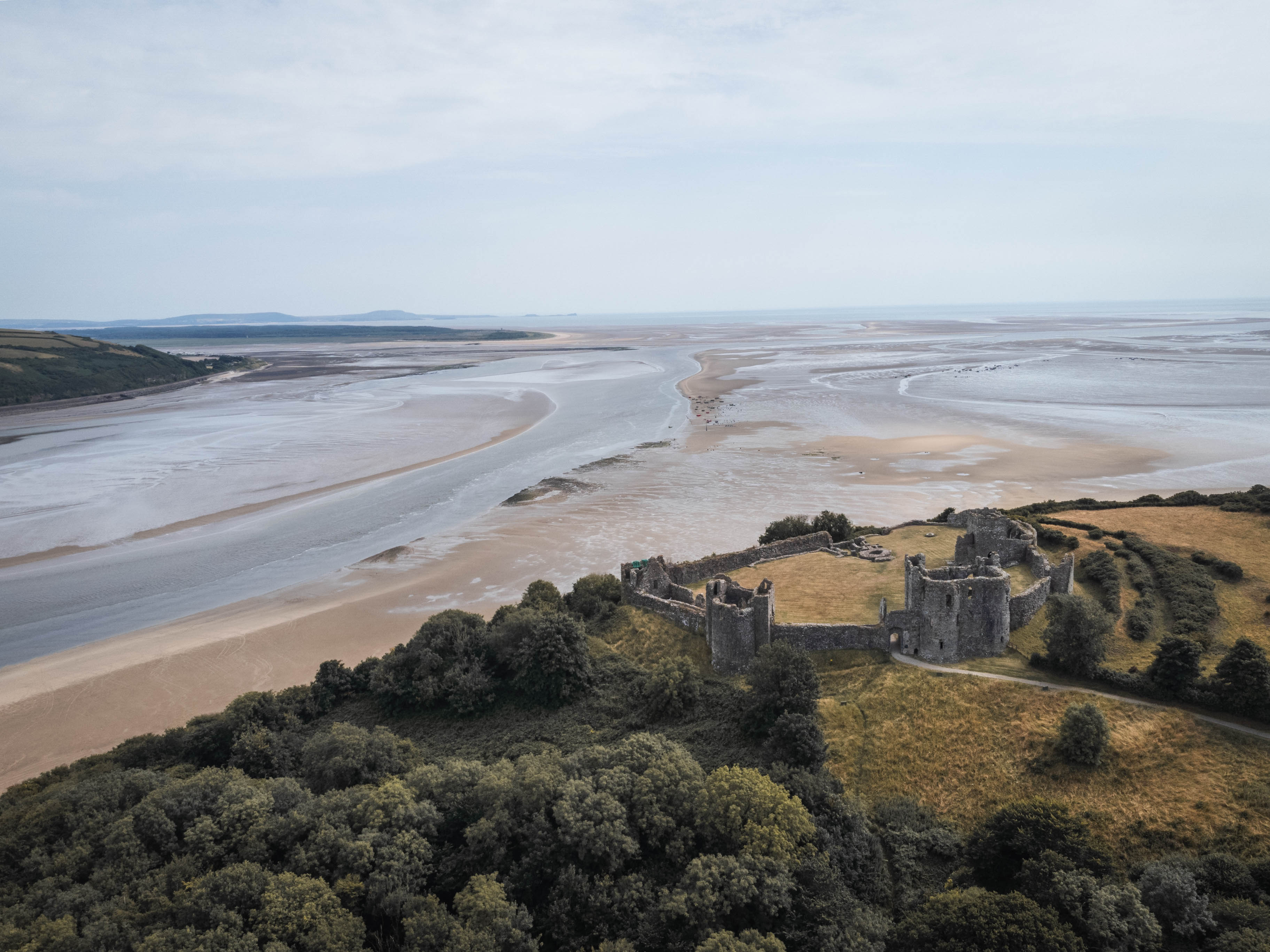
- The castle stands on the west bank of the River Towy estuary

Site information
- Type: Castle
- Owner: Private
- Operator: Cadw (guardianship)
- Website: Llansteffan Castle; Castell Llansteffan (Cadw)

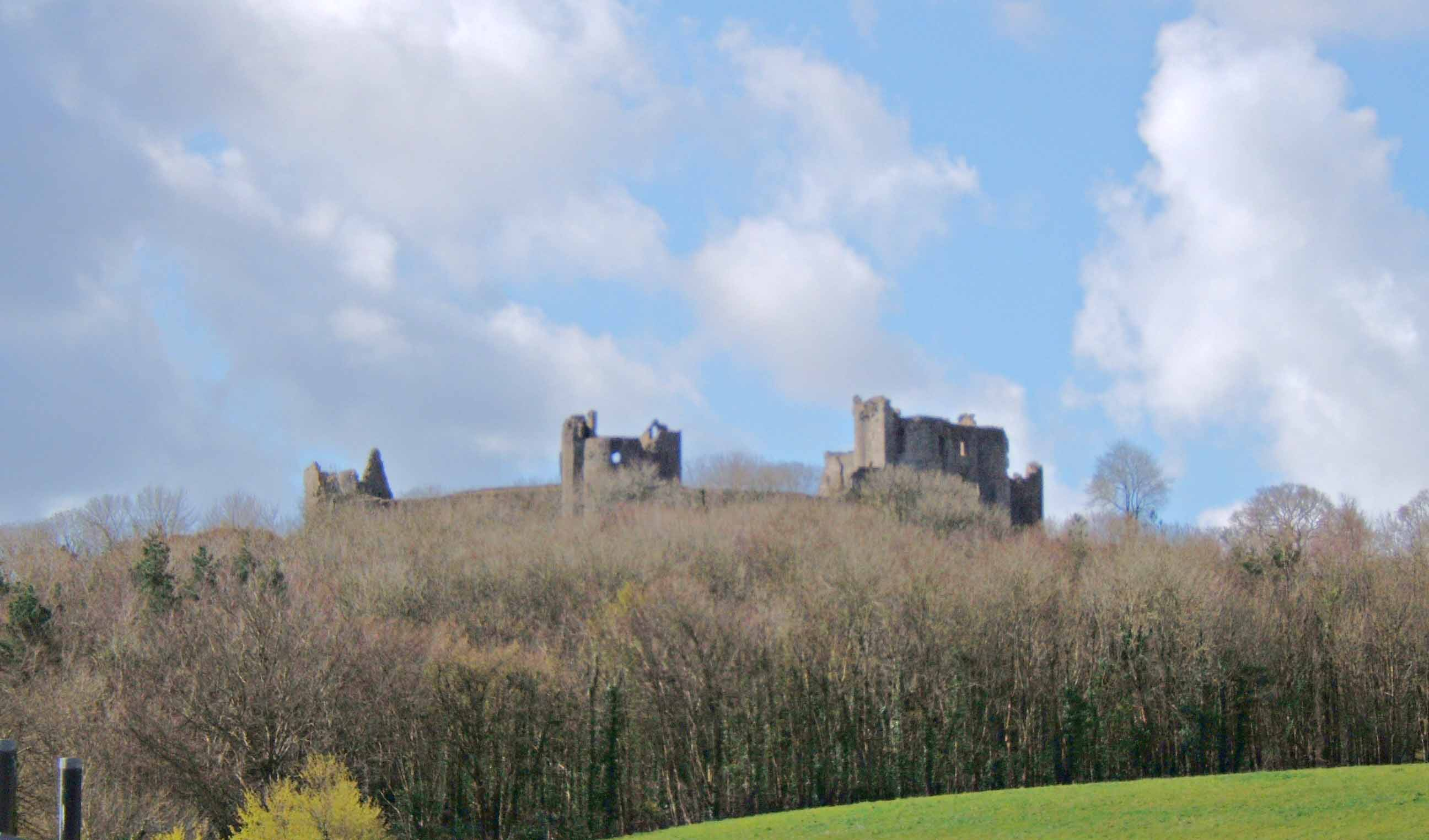
Llansteffan Castle from the north

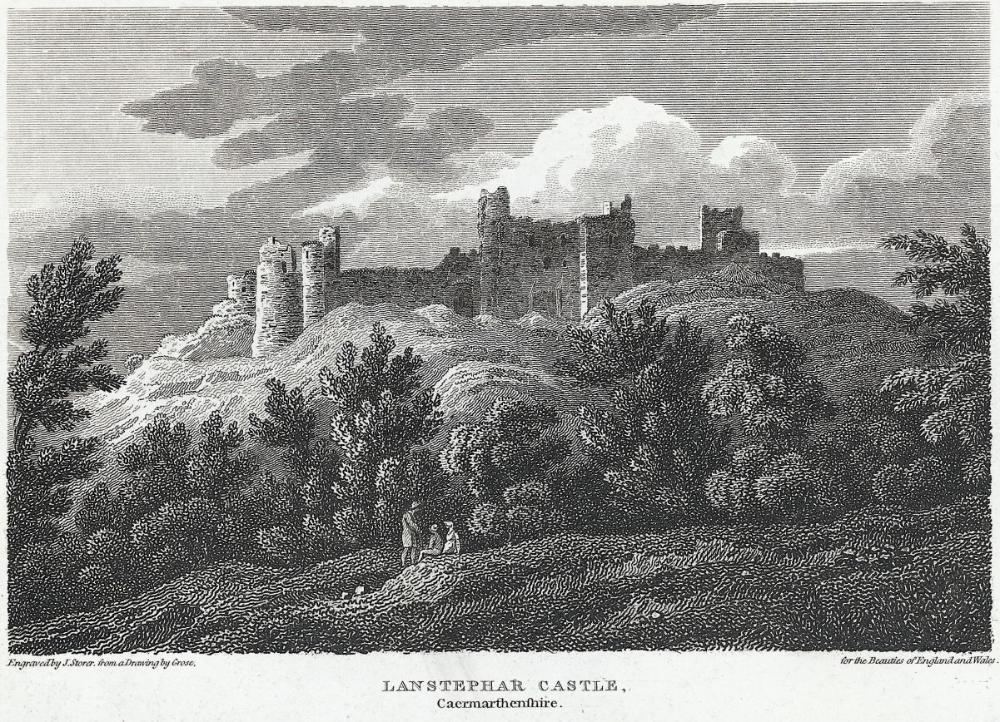
Castle seen from the seafront, as depicted in an engraving from 1811

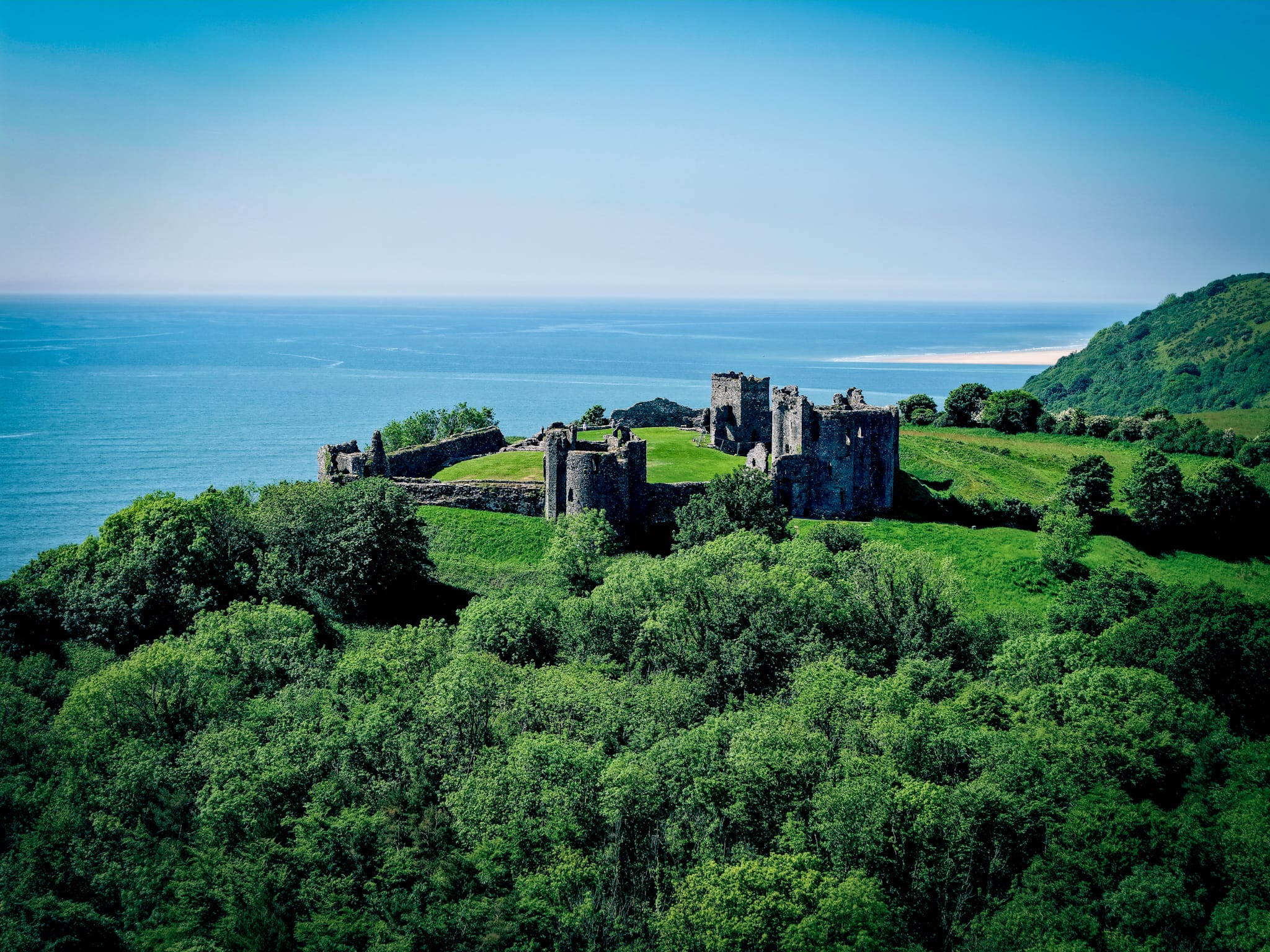
Castle seen by drone 2025

Llansteffan Castle (Welsh: Castell Llansteffan) is a privately owned castle in Llansteffan, Carmarthenshire, Wales, overlooking the River Towy estuary in Carmarthen Bay.

== Iron Age ==
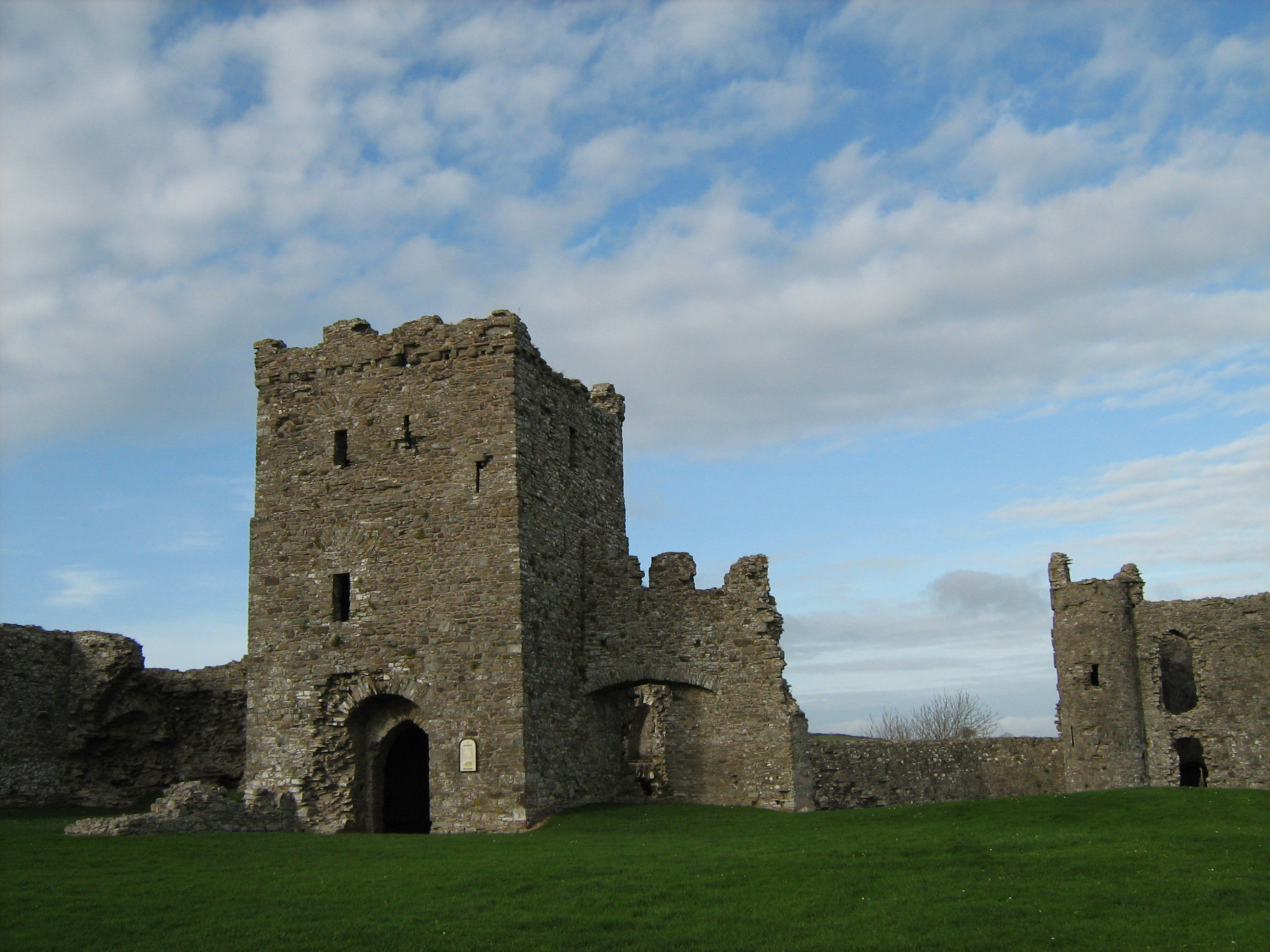
Inner Gatehouse

The castle sits on a much older Iron Age promontory fort, proving Llansteffan has been inhabited for several millennia. The hill where the castle stands commands the River Towy estuary. The hill would have been stripped of trees so that foot soldiers were vulnerable to attack by archers.

The original earthworks can still be seen and were used as part of the modern castle's defence system—the castle proper rests within the earthwork rings.

== Conquest of West Wales ==
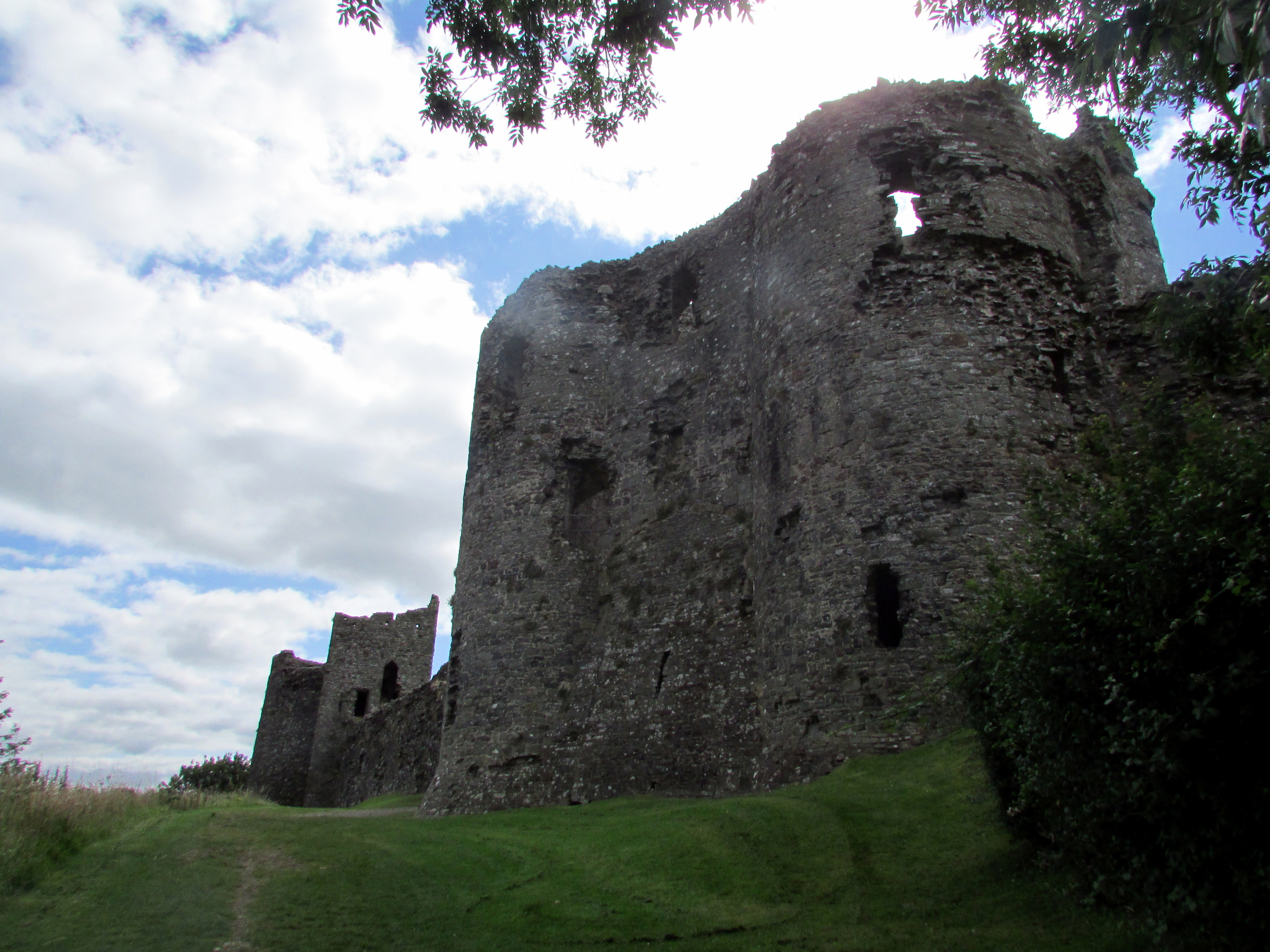
The exterior walls

The castle was built by the Normans after 1100 as part of their invasion of Wales and granted to the Marmion family before passing to the Camvilles through marriage.

It was captured by Maredudd ap Gruffydd in 1146 against the forces of Maurice FitzGerald, Lord of Lanstephan and his brother William FitzGerald, Lord of Emlyn who were the leading Norman settlers of the region, members of the Fitzgerald dynasty.

The castle was retaken by the Normans in 1158. Llywelyn the Great recaptured the castle for the Welsh in 1215 and taken back by the Camville family sometime after 1223. The castle fell to Llywelyn ap Gruffudd in 1257 but returned to the Camvilles by the 1260s.

By 1367, it was described as in a poor state.

== Owain Glyndŵr ==
The castle was captured twice by the forces of Owain Glyndŵr in 1403 and c.1405. It was recaptured by Sir John Pennes in 1408. The castle was later granted to the Crown and the two-tower Gatehouse was converted into a residence.

== Preservation ==
The castle, which is privately owned, is under a deed of guardianship with Cadw. Since 2024, Cadw have used the Welsh name Castell Llansteffan in English, as part of an effort to standardise the names in both languages.

== In the media ==
In 2022 a six episode television series, Teulu'r Castell (meaning 'castle family') was broadcast on the Welsh language channel, S4C. The series follows businesswoman Marian Evans, her husband and two daughters, after they purchased the 100-acre Plas Farm several years beforehand in a confidential deal, including ownership and responsibility for Llansteffan Castle. The Evans family renovate the farm buildings and develop the castle into a wedding venue.

== See also ==
- List of hillforts in Wales
