= Sealegs Amphibious Craft =

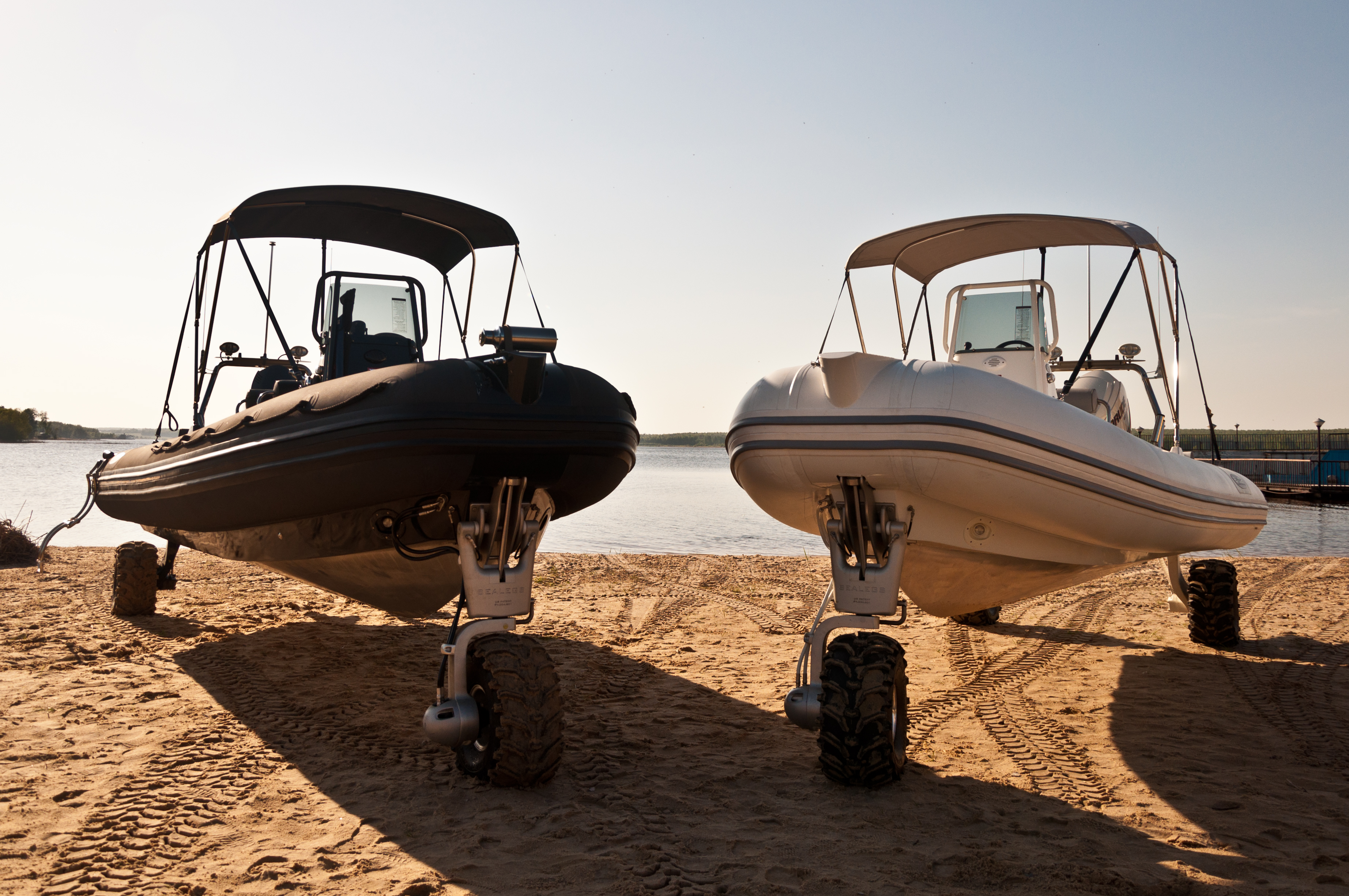
- 7.1m Sealegs craft in Russia

Overview
- Manufacturer: Sealegs International Ltd
- Production: 2005 – present
- Assembly: Auckland, New Zealand

Sealegs Amphibious Craft are a type of amphibious vehicle manufactured by Sealegs International Ltd, a company based in Auckland, New Zealand. Sealegs craft are aluminium fabricated boats fitted with either a hydraulic amphibious system or an electric amphibious system. Both amphibious systems consist of three wheels – one fitted to the bow and two fitted to the transom of the craft. In craft with the hydraulic system, these wheels are lifted, lowered and driven by the hydraulic system which is powered by a petrol engine mounted on the deck. In craft with the electric system, the wheels are equipped with brushless high-torque electric motors, and powered by a central 48-volt 7-kWh lithium battery pack.

Sealegs began production in 2005, and as of September 2015 the company had sold 1000 units into 50 countries.

Sealegs craft can travel up to 39 knots on water and up to 7.5 km/h on land.

The craft are used in both recreational and commercial applications worldwide. Commercial applications include emergency response and rescue, patrol, and tourism. They are used by emergency services in Australia, Fiji, Malaysia, New Zealand, and the United States.

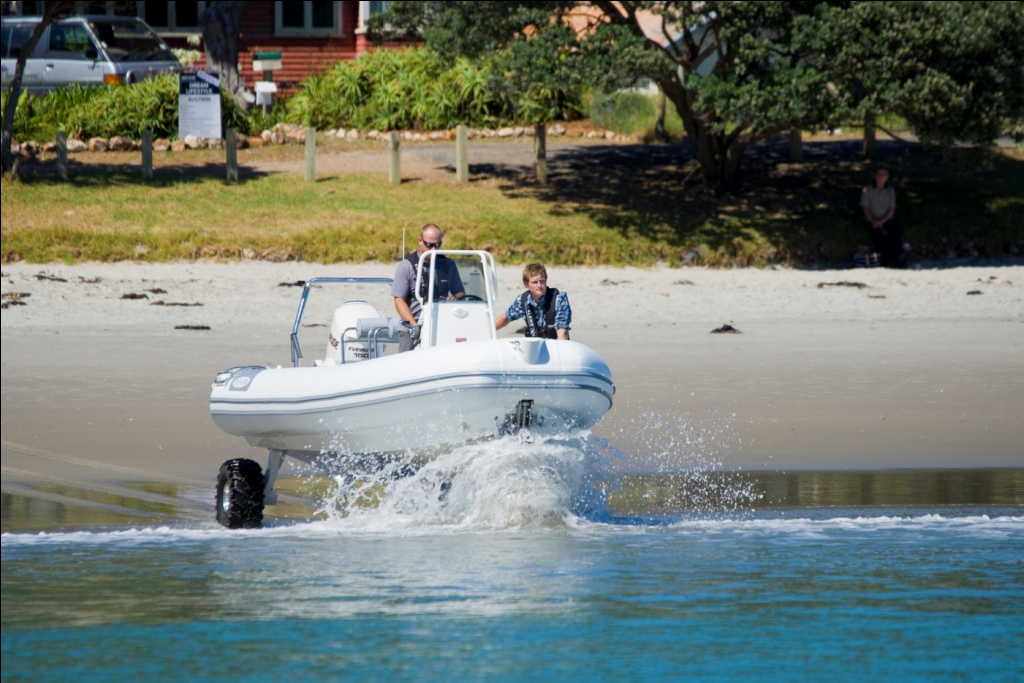
Sealegs 7.1m craft launching from beach

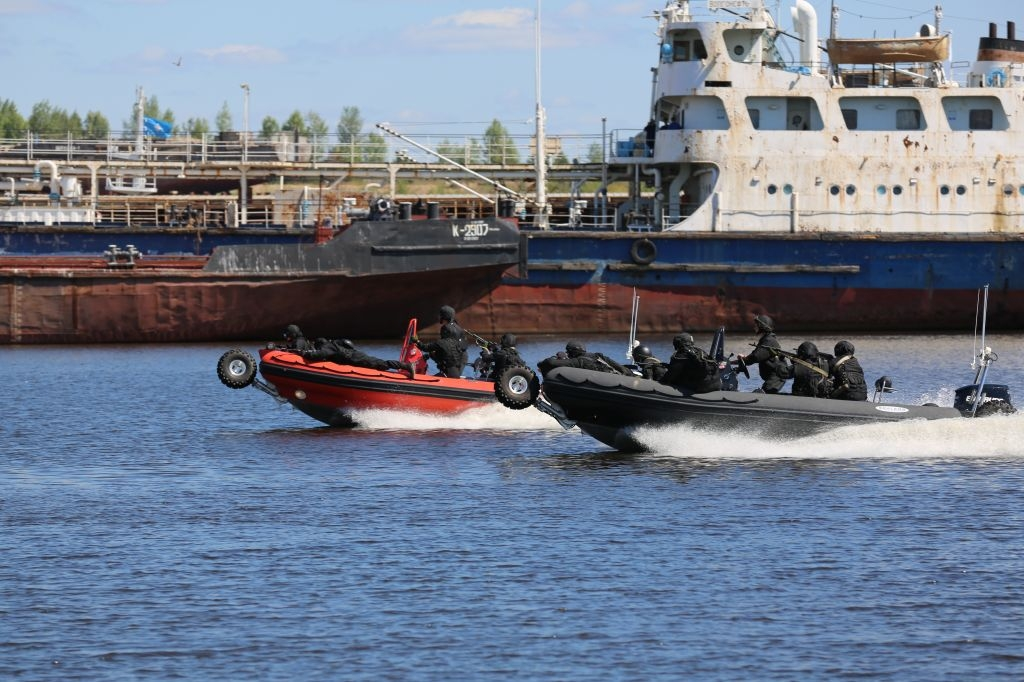
Military exercises using Sealegs craft

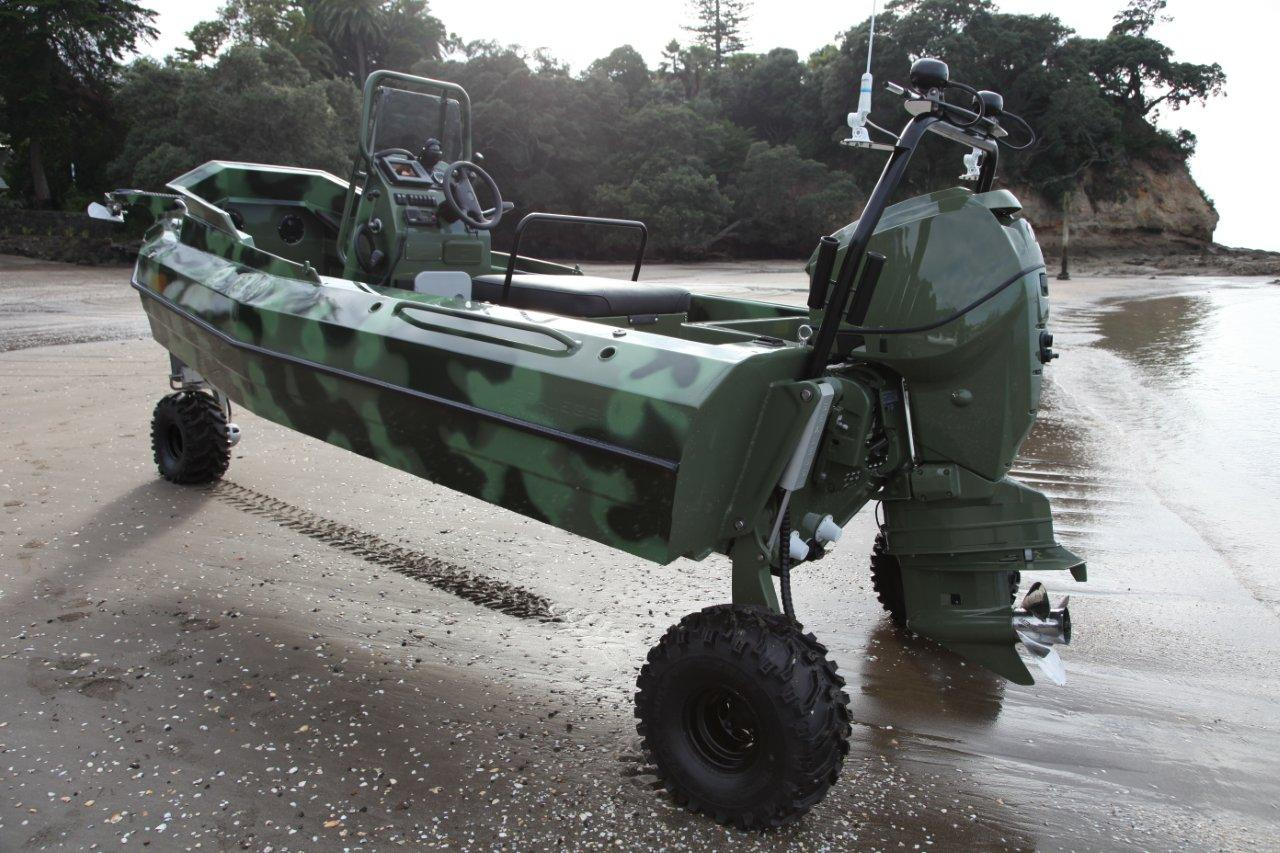
Sealegs 6.1m D-Tube craft

== History ==
Sealegs amphibious craft were invented by New Zealander Maurice Bryham. After prototyping the craft, he partnered with David Mckee Wright to incorporate Sealegs International and begin production in 2005.

In June 2005, businessman Maurice Bryham set a new world record for crossing the English Channel in an amphibious vehicle at 43 minutes and 12 seconds. This defeated a record of 1 hour and 40 minutes, set the previous year by Richard Branson in a Gibbs Aquada.

In early 2009, David Mckee Wright crossed the Cook Strait in a Sealegs craft – the first time this was done in an amphibious vehicle.

In 2013, Sealegs CEO David Mckee Wright completed a circumnavigation of the South Island of New Zealand in a Sealegs 7.7m RIB, the first time an amphibious vehicle had done so.

In December 2014, Sealegs released a collaboration with New Zealand boat builder Stabicraft – the Stabicraft 2100 ST (Sealegs Technology).

In September 2015, Sealegs International announced that it had produced and shipped its 1000th Sealegs craft.

In September 2018, International announced the release of the Sealegs Electric.

== Models ==
- 6.1m Sport RIB
- 6.1m Sport D-Tube
- 7.1m Sport RIB
- 7.5m Hydrasol RIB
- 7.7m Sport D-Tube
- 7.7m Full Width Console RIB
- 7.7m Cabin RIB
- 8.5m Alloy Cabin
- 9.0m Hydrasol RIB (previously known as Interceptor 9000)
- Stabicraft 2100 ST

== Technology ==
All-wheel drive – Sealegs craft come standard with all-wheel drive. This helps craft negotiate difficult terrain.

Oil cooling system – Original Sealegs craft could run on land for 10 minutes within every hour without overheating the oil in the inboard engine. For later models, an oil cooling system has been added, which allows the craft to run for 30 minutes within every hour without overheating.

Power steering – Sealegs craft are fitted with a power steering system. This system can be switched on and off by use of a dash switch.

Enhanced power steering (EPS) – This uses smart PLC and magnetic sensor technology to provide a smooth transition from water to land. While operating a Sealegs craft with EPS on water, the bow wheel remains central; when the craft switches to land operation, wheel steering locks in. During the transition, EPS ensures wheel alignment is central.

Automatic braking system – Sealegs craft are fitted with a hydraulic braking system. This system requires hydraulic pressure to release, meaning that when the craft inboard engine is turned off, or if there is a failure in the hydraulic system, the brakes will lock.
