= List of Roman-to-modern scheduled monuments in Carmarthenshire =

Carmarthenshire is a large rural county in West Wales. It includes mix of upland and mountainous terrain and fertile farmland. The western end of the Brecon Beacons National Park lies within the county. Across Carmarthenshire there are a total of 370 Scheduled monuments. That is too many to have on a single list page, so for convenience the list is divided into the 227 prehistoric sites and the 143 Roman, medieval and post-medieval sites (shown below). Included on this page are 29 sites from Roman period (most, but by no means all military, and predominantly in the north of the county), and 10 early medieval sites (all crosses or inscribed stones). There are 57 sites dating to post-Norman medieval times, including a remarkable collection of 8 castles and a further 25 castle mounds. The 47 varied post-medieval sites include clusters along the coastal area. Carmarthenshire is both a unitary authority and a historic county. Between 1974 and 1996 it was merged with Cardiganshire (now Ceredigion) and Pembrokeshire to form Dyfed.

All the pre-Roman sites are listed at List of Scheduled prehistoric Monuments in Carmarthenshire

Scheduled Ancient Monuments (SAMs) have statutory protection. It is illegal to disturb the ground surface or any standing remains. The compilation of the list is undertaken by Cadw Welsh Historic Monuments, which is an executive agency of the National Assembly of Wales. The list of scheduled monuments below is supplied by Cadw with additional material from RCAHMW and Dyfed Archaeological Trust.

== Scheduled Roman to modern Monuments in Carmarthenshire ==
| Image | Name | Site type | Community | Location | Details | Period | SAM No & Refs |
|---|---|---|---|---|---|---|---|
| | Carmarthen Roman Fort (part of) | Fort | Carmarthen | 51.8568°N 4.3029°W, SN415200 | | Roman | CM235 |
| | Carmarthen Roman Town (part of) | Town | Carmarthen | 51.8597°N 4.3024°W, SN415204 | | Roman | CM234 |
| | Carmarthen Roman Town Defences (part of) | Town defences | Carmarthen | 51.8597°N 4.2979°W, SN418203 | | Roman | CM243 |
| Amphitheatre Moridunum, Carmarthen | Carmarthen Roman Amphitheatre | Amphitheatre | Carmarthen | 51.8621°N 4.2965°W, SN419206 | | Roman | CM206 |
| | Roman Road c. 250m SSW of Gilwen Farm | Road | Cilycwm | 52.0302°N 3.8288°W, SN746384 | | Roman | CM369 |
| | Roman Road c. 400m S of Benlan Farm | Road | Cilycwm | 52.0245°N 3.8703°W, SN717378 | | Roman | CM368 |
| | Annell Aqueduct (lower section) | Aqueduct | Cynwyl Gaeo | 52.0473°N 3.9338°W, SN674405 | | Roman | CM210 |
| | Annell Aqueduct (upper section) | Aqueduct | Cynwyl Gaeo | 52.0663°N 3.8974°W, SN700425 | | Roman | CM211 |
| | Cothi Roman Aqueduct | Aqueduct | Cynwyl Gaeo | 52.0698°N 3.913°W, SN689430 | | Roman | CM213 |
| | Dolaucothi Gold Mines | Gold mine | Cynwyl Gaeo | 52.0438°N 3.9501°W, SN663401 | | Roman | CM208 |
| | Dolaucothi Mound | Mound | Cynwyl Gaeo | 52.0453°N 3.9509°W, SN663403 | | Roman | CM167 |
| | Dolaucothi Roman Aqueduct | Aqueduct | Cynwyl Gaeo | 52.0735°N 3.912°W, SN690434 | | Roman | CM200 |
| | Dolauhirion, section of Roman road N of | Road | Cynwyl Gaeo | 52.0122°N 3.8054°W, SN761364 | | Roman | CM366 |
| | Hut at upper end of Annell Roman Aqueduct | Building (Unclassified) | Cynwyl Gaeo | 52.0671°N 3.8884°W, SN706426 | | Roman | CM212 |
| | Luentinum Pumpsaint Roman Fort | Fort | Cynwyl Gaeo | 52.047°N 3.9614°W, SN655405 | | Roman | CM226 |
| | Roman Water Tank E of Brunant Farm | Water tank | Cynwyl Gaeo | 52.055°N 3.9322°W, SN676413 | | Roman | CM237 |
| | Arosfa Gareg-Llwyd Roman Camp | Marching camp | Llanddeusant | 51.9223°N 3.7432°W, SN802262 | | Roman | CM174 |
| | Cwm-Brwyn Roman Site | Enclosure | Llanddowror | 51.7806°N 4.5329°W, SN253121 | | Roman | CM139 |
| | Dinefwr Park Roman Forts NT | Fort | Llandeilo | 51.8839°N 4.0033°W, SN622224 | Two superimposed Roman forts, now within Dinefwr Park, both from the 70s and 80s AD | Roman | CM367 |
| | Alabum, Llandovery Roman Site | Fort | Llandovery | 52.0021°N 3.7933°W, SN769352 | Roman fort from the 70s AD on the north edge of Llandovery, at the crossroads of the Via Julia Montana (RR623) and the Sarn Helen (RR69) Roman Roads | Roman | CM188 |
| | Abererbwll Roman Fort | Fort | Llanfair-ar-y-bryn, (also Llangamarch), (see also Powys) | 52.06°N 3.6794°W, SN849415 | Small fortlet, presumed Roman, aligned with the nearby Roman road. 70m square, partly within forested land. | Roman | CM373 |
| | Roman Road c. 150m NW of Tal-y-Pal | Road | Llanfair-ar-y-bryn | 52.0248°N 3.7581°W, SN794377 | | Roman | CM370 |
| | Llys-Brychan Roman Villa | Villa | Llangadog | 51.9125°N 3.8843°W, SN704254 | | Roman | CM195 |
| | Enclosure 150m NW of Eithin Man | Enclosed hut circle | Llangynog | 51.8232°N 4.4165°W, SN335166 | | Roman | CM242 |
| | Roman Fortlet 300m SW of Gallt yr Adar Fawr | Fort | Llanwrda | 51.9945°N 3.8713°W, SN716345 | | Roman | CM389 |
| | Hafod Fawr Roman Camp | Practice camp | Myddfai | 51.9694°N 3.7301°W, SN812315 | | Roman | CM371 |
| | Roman Earthwork 540m W of Y Pigwn | Fort | Myddfai | 51.9655°N 3.7179°W, SN820310 | | Roman | CM194 |
| | Y Pigwyn | Marching camp | Myddfai, (also Llywel), (see also Powys) | 51.967°N 3.7071°W, SN828312 | | Roman | BR003 |
| | Roman Road 250m NE of Pwll-y-Hwyaid | Road | Whitland | 51.8251°N 4.611°W, SN201172 | | Roman | CM279 |
| | Inscribed Stone in Llawddog's Churchyard, Cenarth | Inscribed stone | Cenarth | 52.0448°N 4.5237°W, SN270414 | | Early Medieval | CM072 |
| Inscribed stone, Llanglydwen | Llanglydwen Churchyard Cross | Cross | Cilymaenllwyd | 51.9079°N 4.6552°W, SN174265 | | Early Medieval | CM160 |
| Clawdd Mawr earthwork | Clawdd-Mawr | Linear earthwork | Cynwyl Elfed | 51.974°N 4.3633°W, SN377332 | | Early Medieval | CM110 |
| | Inscribed Stone N of Parciau Farmhouse | Inscribed stone | Henllanfallteg | 51.8475°N 4.647°W, SN177198 | | Early Medieval | CM069 |
| | St Canna's Chair | Inscribed stone | Henllanfallteg | 51.8375°N 4.6473°W, SN177187 | | Early Medieval | PE148 |
| | Cross-Incised Stones | Cross-marked stone | Llanddowror | 51.8026°N 4.5319°W, SN255145 | | Early Medieval | CM161 |
| | Llansadurnen Cross-Incised Stone & Other Stones | Cross-marked stone | Llanddowror | 51.7675°N 4.509°W, SN269106 | | Early Medieval | CM136 |
| | Cross-Marked Stone at Cilymaenllwyd House | Cross-marked stone | Llanelli Rural | 51.6914°N 4.2067°W, SN475014 | | Early Medieval | CM217 |
| | Inscribed Stone & Early Gravestones, Llanfihangel-ar-Arth Church | Inscribed stone | Llanfihangel-ar-Arth | 52.0362°N 4.2522°W, SN456399 | | Early Medieval | CM071 |
| | Cross-Incised Stone in Churchyard | Cross-marked stone | Llanpumsaint | 51.9374°N 4.3018°W, SN418290 | | Early Medieval | CM165 |
| | Tir-y-Dail Motte and Bailey Castle | Motte & Bailey | Ammanford | 51.7942°N 3.9963°W, SN624124 | | Medieval | CM067 |
| Carmarthen Castle Gatehouse | Carmarthen Castle | Castle | Carmarthen | 51.8557°N 4.306°W, SN412199 | | Medieval | CM008 |
| | St John's Priory, Carmarthen | Priory | Carmarthen | 51.8601°N 4.2975°W, SN418204 | | Medieval | CM236 |
| | Trebersed Moated Site | Moated Site | Carmarthen | 51.8546°N 4.3491°W, SN383199 | | Medieval | CM249 |
| | Parc-y-Domen | Motte | Cenarth | 52.0441°N 4.5252°W, SN269414 | | Medieval | CM086 |
| | Mynydd Mallaen Long Hut | Rectangular hut | Cilycwm | 52.0753°N 3.8594°W, SN726435 | | Medieval | CM303 |
| | Capel Dewi, Llwyndewi | Chapel | Dyffryn Cennen | 51.8427°N 3.9479°W, SN659178 | | Medieval | CM153 |
| Carreg Cennen Castle | Carreg Cennen Castle | Castle | Dyffryn Cennen | 51.8545°N 3.9352°W, SN668190 | | Medieval | CM001 |
| | Deserted Medieval Settlement | Deserted Medieval Village | Eglwyscummin | 51.7671°N 4.5662°W, SN230107 | | Medieval | CM220 |
| Kidwelly Castle from Gwendraeth Fach | Kidwelly Castle | Castle | Kidwelly | 51.7398°N 4.3055°W, SN409070 | | Medieval | CM002 |
| | Kidwelly Medieval Town (Part of) | Town | Kidwelly | 51.7395°N 4.3067°W, SN408070 | | Medieval | CM209 |
| Kidwelly Town Gate | Kidwelly Town Gate & Defences | Gatehouse | Kidwelly | 51.7382°N 4.307°W, SN408069 | | Medieval | CM183 |
| Laugharne Castle | Laugharne Castle | Castle | Laugharne Township | 51.7696°N 4.4621°W, SN302107 | | Medieval | CM003 |
| | Lan Enclosure | Enclosure | Llanboidy | 51.855°N 4.5917°W, SN216205 | | Medieval | CM294 |
| | Llanboidy Mound & Bailey Castle | Motte & Bailey | Llanboidy | 51.878°N 4.589°W, SN218231 | | Medieval | CM098 |
| Foundations of Whitland Abbey | Whitland Abbey | Abbey | Llanboidy | 51.8336°N 4.6022°W, SN207182 | | Medieval | CM014 |
| | Twyn yr Esgair Settlement | Rectangular hut | Llanddeusant | 51.8993°N 3.7427°W, SN801237 | | Medieval | CM306 |
| | Dolgarn Moated Site | Moated Site | Llanddowror | 51.8106°N 4.5176°W, SN265154 | | Medieval | CM252 |
| The circular keep of Dinefwr Castle | Dinefwr Castle NT | Castle | Llandeilo | 51.8768°N 4.0175°W, SN612217 | | Medieval | CM029 |
| Llandovery Castle | Llandovery Castle | Castle | Llandovery | 51.9927°N 3.7962°W, SN767342 | | Medieval | CM015 |
| | Hendy Castle Mound | Motte | Llanedi | 51.7098°N 4.0506°W, SN584032 | | Medieval | CM096 |
| | Hendy Earthwork | Enclosure | Llanedi | 51.7107°N 4.0492°W, SN585033 | | Medieval | CM097 |
| | Pen y Cnap Castle | Motte | Llanegwad | 51.8712°N 4.1563°W, SN516213 | | Medieval | CM151 |
| | Capel Isaf Cemetery | Cemetery | Llanelli | 51.6845°N 4.1421°W, SN520005 | | Medieval | CM387 |
| | Old Castle motte, Llanelli | Motte | Llanelli | 51.6819°N 4.1705°W, SN500003 | | Medieval | CM323 |
| | Capel Dewi, Llwynhendy | Chapel | Llanelli Rural | 51.677°N 4.1145°W, SS538996 | | Medieval | CM324 |
| | Castell Du Castle Mound | Motte | Llanfihangel-ar-Arth | 51.9832°N 4.2768°W, SN437340 | | Medieval | CM114 |
| | Castle Llwyn Bedw | Motte | Llanfihangel-ar-Arth | 52.0337°N 4.2886°W, SN431397 | | Medieval | CM021 |
| | Castle Pencader | Motte | Llanfihangel-ar-Arth | 52.0024°N 4.267°W, SN444362 | | Medieval | CM070 |
| | Castell Meurig | Motte & Bailey | Llangadog | 51.9315°N 3.8788°W, SN709276 | | Medieval | CM099 |
| Dryslwyn Castle | Dryslwyn Castle | Hillfort | Llangathen | 51.8632°N 4.1007°W, SN554203 | | Prehistoric | CM030 |
| | Domen Llawddog (Or Tomen Maesllan) Mound & Bailey Castle | Motte & Bailey | Llangeler | 52.0004°N 4.3911°W, SN359362 | | Medieval | CM022 |
| | Domen Seba (or Y Tomen Fawr) Castle Mound | Motte | Llangeler | 52.0062°N 4.4408°W, SN325370 | | Medieval | CM020 |
| | Pen Castell | Motte | Llangeler | 52.0169°N 4.3295°W, SN402379 | | Medieval | CM080 |
| | Banc y Bettws Castle Mound | Motte | Llangyndeyrn | 51.8165°N 4.2378°W, SN458154 | | Medieval | CM124 |
| | Castell y Domen, Gwempa | Motte | Llangyndeyrn | 51.79°N 4.2679°W, SN436125 | | Medieval | CM240 |
| | Cwrt Malle Moated Site, Llangynog | Moated site | Llangynog | 51.8303°N 4.3569°W, SN376172 | | Medieval | CM390 |
| | St.Teilo's Church, Llandeilo Abercywyn | Chapel | Llangynog | 51.7904°N 4.4529°W, SN309130 | | Medieval | CM280 |
| | Castell Nonni | Motte | Llanllwni | 52.0366°N 4.1958°W, SN494398 | | Medieval | CM102 |
| | Pant-Glas Castle Mound | Motte | Llanpumsaint | 51.9099°N 4.2956°W, SN421259 | | Medieval | CM121 |
| Llansteffan Castle | Llansteffan Castle | Castle | Llansteffan | 51.7655°N 4.3908°W, SN351101 | | Medieval | CM004 |
| | Yr Hen Gapel, Llanybri | Chapel | Llansteffan | 51.7869°N 4.4124°W, SN337125 | | Medieval | CM250 |
| | Castell Bach | Motte | Llanwinio | 51.9191°N 4.5495°W, SN247275 | | Medieval | CM129 |
| | Castell Mawr Mound and Bailey Castle | Motte & Bailey | Llanwinio | 51.917°N 4.5522°W, SN245273 | | Medieval | CM131 |
| | Llanwrda Castle Mound | Motte | Llanwrda | 51.9779°N 3.8484°W, SN731326 | | Medieval | CM239 |
| | Castell Waunberllan | Moated Site | Myddfai | 51.9546°N 3.7917°W, SN769299 | | Medieval | CM251 |
| Newcastle Emlyn Castle | Newcastle Emlyn Castle | Castle | Newcastle Emlyn | 52.0391°N 4.4632°W, SN311407 | | Medieval | CM085 |
| | Garn-Fawr Castle Mound | Motte | Newchurch and Merthyr | 51.8896°N 4.3318°W, SN396237 | | Medieval | CM011 |
| | Waun Twmpath Motte | Motte | Pembrey and Burry Port Town | 51.7007°N 4.2216°W, SN465025 | | Medieval | CM238 |
| | Claustral Buildings, St Clears Priory | Priory | St Clears | 51.8135°N 4.4941°W, SN281157 | | Medieval | CM290 |
| | Llanfihangel Abercowin Old Parish Church & Norman Grave-Slabs | Church | St Clears | 51.7928°N 4.4626°W, SN302133 | | Medieval | CM144 |
| | St Clears Mound and Bailey Castle | Motte & Bailey | St Clears | 51.8107°N 4.4949°W, SN281153 | | Medieval | CM095 |
| | Trefenty Mound and Bailey Castle | Motte & Bailey | St Clears | 51.7946°N 4.4708°W, SN297135 | | Medieval | CM143 |
| Talley Abbey | Talley Abbey | Abbey | Talley | 51.9765°N 3.9922°W, SN632327 | | Medieval | CM013 |
| | Talley Mound and Bailey Castle | Motte & Bailey | Talley | 51.9819°N 3.994°W, SN631333 | | Medieval | CM077 |
| | Capel Bettws | Chapel | Trelech | 51.9251°N 4.5044°W, SN278281 | | Medieval | CM125 |
| Medieval bridge over the River Gwendraeth Fawr | Spudder's Bridge (Pont Spwdwr) | Bridge | Trimsaran | 51.7298°N 4.2692°W, SN433058 | Six-arched 17th-century bridge and causeway over the River Gwendraeth Fawr and its flood plain, between Trimsaran and Kidwelly. Also called Pont Spwdwr. A replacement alongside now carries the road traffic. | Medieval | CM006 |
| | The Bulwarks (Civil War) | Earthwork (unclassified) | Carmarthen | 51.8551°N 4.312°W, SN408199 | | Post-Medieval/Modern | CM009 |
| | Cenarth Bridge | Bridge | Cenarth, (also Beulah), (see also Ceredigion) | 52.0456°N 4.5253°W, SN269415 | | Post-Medieval/Modern | CM017 |
| | Dolau-Hirion Bridge | Bridge | Cilycwm | 52.0095°N 3.8051°W, SN762360 | | Post-Medieval/Modern | CM005 |
| | Bancbryn post-medieval lluest farmstead | Farmstead | Cwmamman | 51.7783°N 3.9108°W, SN682105 | | Post-Medieval/Modern | CM332 |
| | Waun-hir post-medieval lluest farmstead | Farmstead | Cwmamman | 51.7859°N 3.9385°W, SN663114 | | Post-Medieval/Modern | CM331 |
| | Esgair Gaeo Deserted Rural Settlement | Rectangular hut | Cynwyl Gaeo | 52.1381°N 3.8659°W, SN723505 | | Post-Medieval/Modern | CM298 |
| | Beddau'r Derwyddon | Pillow mound | Dyffryn Cennen | 51.8454°N 3.9271°W, SN673180 | | Post-Medieval/Modern | CM154 |
| | Cincoed Limestone Quarries and Kilns | Quarry | Dyffryn Cennen | 51.8401°N 3.9693°W, SN644175 | | Post-Medieval/Modern | CM276 |
| | Limekilns East of Cincoed | Limekiln | Dyffryn Cennen | 51.8397°N 3.9663°W, SN646175 | | Post-Medieval/Modern | CM275 |
| | Site of Forge at Llandyfan | Iron forge | Dyffryn Cennen | 51.8339°N 3.9516°W, SN656168 | | Post-Medieval/Modern | CM223 |
| Dovecote 1km west of Kidwelly | Coleman Dovecot | Dovecote | Kidwelly | 51.7404°N 4.3239°W, SN396071 | | Post-Medieval/Modern | CM152 |
| | Hot & Cold Rolling Mills, Kidwelly Tinplate Works | Industrial monument | Kidwelly | 51.7479°N 4.288°W, SN421079 | Now a working tinworks museum. | Post-Medieval/Modern | CM254 |
| Kidwelly Tinplate works | Kidwelly Old Tinplate Works and Dam | Tinplate Works | Kidwelly | 51.7463°N 4.2892°W, SN420077 | | Post-Medieval/Modern | CM291 |
| | Garnbwll Limekiln | Limekiln | Llanddarog | 51.8045°N 4.1793°W, SN498140 | | Post-Medieval/Modern | CM278 |
| | Maesdulais Limekilns | Limekiln | Llanddarog | 51.8093°N 4.1501°W, SN518144 | | Post-Medieval/Modern | CM272 |
| | Odyn Jac Limekilns | Limekiln | Llanddarog | 51.807°N 4.1739°W, SN502142 | | Post-Medieval/Modern | CM273 |
| | Genwen Engine House | Engine house | Llanelli Rural | 51.6761°N 4.1046°W, SS545995 | | Post-Medieval/Modern | CM263 |
| | Glynea Colliery | Coal Mine | Llanelli Rural | 51.6723°N 4.1015°W, SS547991 | | Post-Medieval/Modern | CM262 |
| | Horeb Brickworks | Kiln | Llanelli Rural | 51.726°N 4.1715°W, SN501052 | | Post-Medieval/Modern | CM281 |
| | Pencoed Lead Works | Lead mine | Llanelli Rural | 51.6764°N 4.0826°W, SS561995 | | Post-Medieval/Modern | CM282 |
| | Raby's Furnace | Iron forge | Llanelli Rural | 51.6928°N 4.166°W, SN503015 | | Post-Medieval/Modern | CM219 |
| Cycle Path along the line of the Carmarthenshire Railway | Section of former Carmarthenshire Railway, Felinfoel | Railway | Llanelli Rural | 51.7073°N 4.1476°W, SN517031 | | Post-Medieval/Modern | CM274 |
| | St David's Colliery | Coal Mine | Llanelli Rural | 51.6917°N 4.1145°W, SN539013 | | Post-Medieval/Modern | CM265 |
| | Nant-y-Mwyn Lead Mine Engine House, Rhandir-Mwyn | Engine house | Llanfair-ar-y-bryn | 52.0856°N 3.7715°W, SN787445 | | Post-Medieval/Modern | CM215 |
| | Blaen y Cylchau Deserted Rural Settlement | Rectangular hut settlement | Llangadog | 51.8543°N 3.7969°W, SN763188 | | Post-Medieval/Modern | CM307 |
| | Cae Sara Lead Mine | Lead mine | Llangadog | 51.9328°N 3.8143°W, SN753275 | | Post-Medieval/Modern | CM283 |
| | Cwm Clydach settlement | Building (Unclassified) | Llangadog | 51.8558°N 3.8275°W, SN742190 | | Post-Medieval/Modern | CM358 |
| | Moel Gornach settlement | Building (Unclassified) | Llangadog | 51.8536°N 3.8278°W, SN742188 | | Post-Medieval/Modern | CM359 |
| | Pont Clydach settlement | Building (Unclassified) | Llangadog | 51.8616°N 3.8336°W, SN738197 | | Post-Medieval/Modern | CM357 |
| | Penprys Pit Engine House | Engine house | Llangennech | 51.6961°N 4.1133°W, SN540018 | | Post-Medieval/Modern | CM266 |
| | Limekilns at Penymynydd, Pedair Heol | Limekiln | Llangyndeyrn | 51.7622°N 4.2624°W, SN439094 | | Post-Medieval/Modern | CM277 |
| | Remains of Blast Furnace at Pont Henry | Industrial building | Llangyndeyrn | 51.7603°N 4.2122°W, SN474091 | | Post-Medieval/Modern | CM227 |
| | Deserted Settlements 800m N of Blaenau Farm | Deserted Rural Settlement | Myddfai | 51.8641°N 3.6738°W, SN848197 | | Post-Medieval/Modern | BR194 |
| Bridge over River Teifi at Newcastle Emlyn | Newcastle Emlyn Bridge | Bridge | Newcastle Emlyn, (also Llandyfriog), (see also Ceredigion) | 52.0404°N 4.4667°W, SN309408 | | Post-Medieval/Modern | CM087 |
| | Colliery Ventilation Furnace at Pembrey | Industrial monument | Pembrey and Burry Port Town | 51.69°N 4.27°W, SN431014 | | Post-Medieval/Modern | CM267 |
| | Iron Tub Boats at Burry Port Harbour | Boat | Pembrey and Burry Port Town | 51.6784°N 4.2495°W, SN445001 | | Post-Medieval/Modern | CM268 |
| Old Pembrey Harbour | Pembrey Old Harbour | Pier | Pembrey and Burry Port Town | 51.6777°N 4.2628°W, SN436000 | | Post-Medieval/Modern | CM296 |
| | Stanley's Tramroad Embankment, Pembrey | Tramroad | Pembrey and Burry Port Town | 51.6851°N 4.2671°W, SN433009 | | Post-Medieval/Modern | CM271 |
| | Cwm Twrch settlement | Building (Unclassified) | Quarter Bach | 51.8256°N 3.7864°W, SN769156 | | Post-Medieval/Modern | CM354 |
| | Cwm Twrch settlement and limekiln | Building (Unclassified) | Quarter Bach | 51.8375°N 3.7848°W, SN771169 | | Post-Medieval/Modern | CM355 |
| | Glanstony Aqueduct, Trimsaran | Navigable aqueduct | Trimsaran | 51.7243°N 4.278°W, SN427053 | | Post-Medieval/Modern | CM270 |
| | Kymer's Canal and Pwll y Llygoed Tramroad Bridge | Canal | Trimsaran | 51.7381°N 4.2548°W, SN444067 | Oldest canal in Wales, built in 1766 to carry coal via a tramroad over the River Gwendraeth Fawr at Pwll-y-Llygod, and 3 miles of canal to Kidwelly harbour. Later extended and then in 1873 the towpath was converted into a railway. | Post-Medieval/Modern | CM261 |
| | Cynwyl Elfed Anti-invasion Defences | Anti-invasion defence site | Cynwyl Elfed | 51.9184°N 4.3664°W, SN373270 | | Post-Medieval/Modern | CM374 |
| | Ty Cwm Tawel Anti-invasion Defences | Anti-invasion defence site | Cynwyl Elfed | 51.9084°N 4.3425°W, SN389259 | | Post-Medieval/Modern | CM372 |
| | Pont Henllan Pillbox | Pillbox | Llangeler | 52.0343°N 4.3984°W, SN355400 | | Post-Medieval/Modern | CM375 |
| Disused RAF training gunnery dome and a Spitfire | Dome Gunnery Trainer, Pembrey Airfield | Gunnery Training Dome | Pembrey and Burry Port Town | 51.7095°N 4.3062°W, SN407037 | | Post-Medieval/Modern | CM248 |
| | St Ishmael's Scar Beach Defence Gun House | Gun house | St Ishmael | 51.7486°N 4.3743°W, SN361082 | | Post-Medieval/Modern | CM383 |

Scheduled Monuments in Carmarthenshire, Wales.
=Prehistoric =Roman =Early Medieval
=Medieval =Post-Medieval/Modern

== See also ==
- List of Cadw properties
- List of castles in Wales
- List of hill forts in Wales
- Historic houses in Wales
- List of monastic houses in Wales
- List of museums in Wales
- List of Roman villas in Wales
