= List of prehistoric scheduled monuments in Carmarthenshire =

Carmarthenshire is a large rural county in West Wales. It includes mix of upland and mountainous terrain and fertile farmland. The western end of the Brecon Beacons National Park lies within the county. Across Carmarthenshire there are a total of 370 Scheduled monuments, which is too many for a single list page. For convenience the list is divided into the 227 prehistoric sites (shown below) and the 143 Roman to modern sites. Included on this page are small number of stone chambered tombs from the Neolithic. There are a large and diverse variety of burial cairns, mounds and barrows, mainly from the Bronze Age, accounting for 197 sites. A further 49 Iron Age sites are mostly defensive sites such as hillforts and enclosures. Carmarthenshire is both a unitary authority and a historic county. Between 1974 and 1996 it was merged with Cardiganshire (now Ceredigion) and Pembrokeshire to form Dyfed.

All the Roman, early medieval, medieval and modern sites are listed at List of Scheduled Roman to modern Monuments in Carmarthenshire

Scheduled Ancient Monuments (SAMs) have statutory protection. It is illegal to disturb the ground surface or any standing remains. The compilation of the list is undertaken by Cadw Welsh Historic Monuments, which is an executive agency of the National Assembly of Wales. The list of scheduled monuments below is supplied by Cadw with additional material from RCAHMW and Dyfed Archaeological Trust.

== Scheduled prehistoric Monuments in Carmarthenshire ==
Image	Name	Site type	Community	Location	Details	Period	SAM No & Refs
Carn Besi	Carn Besi Burial Chamber	Chambered tomb	Cilymaenllwyd	51.9171°N 4.6823°W, SN156276		Prehistoric (Neolithic)	CM049
	Cerrig Llwydion Burial Chamber	Chambered tomb	Cynwyl Elfed	51.9679°N 4.3685°W, SN373325		Prehistoric	CM047
	Morfa-Bychan Burial Chambers, Cairns, House Sites & Fields	Chambered tomb	Eglwyscummin	51.7374°N 4.5772°W, SN221074		Prehistoric	CM053
	Burial Chamber near Cross Hands	Chambered tomb	Llanboidy	51.8758°N 4.6224°W, SN195229		Prehistoric	CM048
	Dol-Wilym Burial Chamber	Chambered tomb	Llanboidy	51.8993°N 4.6605°W, SN170256		Prehistoric	CM031
	Gelli Burial Chamber	Chambered Round Cairn	Llanfair-ar-y-bryn	52.0972°N 3.7966°W, SN770458		Prehistoric	CM177
	Waun Pwtlyn Long Barrow	Long barrow	Llangadog	51.9177°N 3.8788°W, SN708260		Prehistoric	CM012
	Meini Llwydion Burial Chamber	Chambered tomb	Llangain	51.8131°N 4.3555°W, SN377153		Prehistoric	CM057
	Rhyd-Lydan Cromlech	Burial Chamber	Llangain	51.819°N 4.353°W, SN379159		Prehistoric	CM056
	Coetan Samson Burial Chamber	Chambered tomb	Llangeler	51.9998°N 4.3135°W, SN412360		Prehistoric	CM046
	Mynydd Llangyndeyrn Burial Chamber	Chambered tomb	Llangyndeyrn	51.7978°N 4.1976°W, SN485133		Prehistoric	CM061
	Twlc y Filliast Burial Chamber	Chambered tomb	Llangynog	51.8188°N 4.4124°W, SN338161		Prehistoric	CM055
	Fron Ucha Burial Chamber	Chambered tomb	Llansteffan	51.7709°N 4.3993°W, SN345107		Prehistoric	CM058
	Berrisbrook Standing Stones	Standing stone	Cilycwm	52.022°N 3.8727°W, SN716376		Prehistoric	CM182
	Maen Bach Standing Stone	Standing stone	Cilycwm	52.0894°N 3.8539°W, SN730450		Prehistoric	CM300
	Mynydd Mallaen Standing Stone	Standing stone	Cilycwm	52.0863°N 3.8467°W, SN735447		Prehistoric	CM301
	Troedrhiwhir standing stone	Standing stone	Cilycwm	52.1096°N 3.8194°W, SN755472		Prehistoric	CM353
	Ty Newydd Standing Stone	Standing stone	Cilycwm	52.0989°N 3.7871°W, SN776460		Prehistoric	CM292
	Capel Nebo Standing Stone	Standing stone	Cilymaenllwyd	51.8961°N 4.7069°W, SN138254		Prehistoric	CM159
	Maen Pica	Standing stone	Cilymaenllwyd	51.8943°N 4.7166°W, SN131252		Prehistoric	CM158
	Standing Stone 495m NW of Coynant	Standing stone	Cilymaenllwyd	51.8967°N 4.6842°W, SN154254		Prehistoric	CM185
	Standing Stone 630m NNW of Pant-yr-Odyn	Standing stone	Cilymaenllwyd	51.8974°N 4.6906°W, SN149255		Prehistoric	CM186
	Yr Allor	Standing stone	Cilymaenllwyd	51.9069°N 4.706°W, SN139266		Prehistoric	CM052
	Carreg Wen Standing Stone	Standing stone	Cynwyl Elfed	51.9745°N 4.3927°W, SN357333		Prehistoric	CM317
	Gareg Hir Standing Stone	Standing stone	Cynwyl Elfed	51.9787°N 4.3221°W, SN406336		Prehistoric	CM202
	Garreg Wen Standing Stone	Standing stone	Cynwyl Elfed	51.9526°N 4.4294°W, SN331310		Prehistoric	CM314
	Nant Cilgwyn standing stone	Standing stone	Cynwyl Gaeo	52.0155°N 3.9508°W, SN662370		Prehistoric	CM361
	Bryngwyn Standing Stone	Standing stone	Dyffryn Cennen	51.8847°N 3.9329°W, SN670224		Prehistoric	CM155
	Ffairfach standing stone	Standing stone	Dyffryn Cennen	51.876°N 3.997°W, SN626216		Prehistoric	CM325
	Pen-Lan-Uchaf Standing Stone	Standing stone	Kidwelly	51.7512°N 4.3017°W, SN412083		Prehistoric	CM197
	Delacorse Uchaf Standing Stone	Standing stone	Laugharne Township	51.7782°N 4.4548°W, SN307116		Prehistoric	CM310
	Standing Stone & Round Cairns S of Tyle-Pengam	Standing stone	Llanddeusant	51.8881°N 3.7954°W, SN765225		Prehistoric	CM181
	Group of Standing Stones NE of Llechdwnni	Standing stone	Llandyfaelog	51.7676°N 4.2738°W, SN431101		Prehistoric	CM060
	Is-Coed-Uchaf Standing Stone	Standing stone	Llandyfaelog	51.7865°N 4.3407°W, SN386123		Prehistoric	CM198
	Bryn-y-Rhyd Standing Stone	Standing stone	Llanedi	51.7561°N 4.0467°W, SN588083		Prehistoric	CM193
	Llech Ciste Standing Stone	Standing stone	Llanegwad	51.9336°N 4.1624°W, SN514283		Prehistoric	CM043
	Standing Stone S of Llwyn-Du Farm	Standing stone	Llangadog	51.9027°N 3.9265°W, SN675244		Prehistoric	CM180
	Standing Stone NNW of Clomendy	Standing stone	Llangain	51.809°N 4.3411°W, SN386148		Prehistoric	CM184
	Clos-Teg Standing Stones	Standing stone	Llangyndeyrn	51.8124°N 4.2421°W, SN455150		Prehistoric	CM123
	Gwempa Standing Stone	Standing stone	Llangyndeyrn	51.7772°N 4.2553°W, SN445111		Prehistoric	CM316
	Mynydd Llangyndeyrn Round Cairns	Standing stone	Llangyndeyrn	51.7986°N 4.2°W, SN483133		Prehistoric	CM203
	Pen Celli Standing Stone	Standing stone	Llangyndeyrn	51.801°N 4.2647°W, SN439137		Prehistoric	CM122
	Standing Stone NE of Halfway House	Standing stone	Llangyndeyrn	51.7861°N 4.2456°W, SN452120		Prehistoric	CM191
	Meini Llwydion Group of Standing Stones	Standing stone	Llangynog	51.7988°N 4.4458°W, SN314139		Prehistoric	CM054
	Bryn Maen Standing Stone	Standing stone	Llannon	51.7409°N 4.0939°W, SN555067		Prehistoric	CM192
	Ffos-y-Maen Standing Stone	Standing stone	Llanpumsaint	51.9306°N 4.3074°W, SN414283		Prehistoric	CM189
	Maen Llwyd Standing Stone	Standing stone	Llansteffan	51.7964°N 4.3789°W, SN360135		Prehistoric	CM064
	Maen Melyn Standing Stone	Standing stone	Llansteffan	51.7894°N 4.398°W, SN347127		Prehistoric	CM063
	Maen Gwyn Hir	Standing stone	Llanwinio	51.942°N 4.5631°W, SN239301		Prehistoric	CM094
	Pant-Teg Standing Stone	Standing stone	Llanybydder	52.0456°N 4.1117°W, SN552406		Prehistoric	CM196
	Hirfaen Standing Stone	Standing stone	Llanycrwys	52.0993°N 4.0094°W, SN624464		Prehistoric	CM028
	Mynydd Myddfai Standing Stones	Standing stone	Myddfai	51.9411°N 3.7371°W, SN806283		Prehistoric	CM041
	Lower Court Standing Stone	Standing stone	St Clears	51.8066°N 4.4558°W, SN307148		Prehistoric	CM146
	Trefenty Standing Stone	Standing stone	St Clears	51.7958°N 4.4599°W, SN304136		Prehistoric	CM145
	Is-Coed Standing Stone	Standing stone	St Ishmael	51.7759°N 4.3483°W, SN380111		Prehistoric	CM199
	Round Barrow 200m SSW of Felin-Wen-Isaf	Round barrow	Abergwili	51.8681°N 4.2364°W, SN461212		Prehistoric	CM228
	Crug Pant y Bugail round barrow	Round barrow	Abernant	51.8965°N 4.3844°W, SN360246		Prehistoric	CM320
	Crug Gorllwyn Round Barrow	Round barrow	Cenarth	51.9798°N 4.4449°W, SN321340		Prehistoric	CM108
	Moelfre Round Barrows	Round barrow	Cenarth	51.9982°N 4.4396°W, SN326361		Prehistoric	CM107
	Burnt Mound on Esgair Ferchon	Burnt mound	Cilycwm	52.0713°N 3.8628°W, SN724430		Prehistoric	CM299
	Cairns & Stone Circle S of Pen-y-Raglan-Wynt	Ring cairn	Cilycwm	52.1281°N 3.8465°W, SN736493		Prehistoric	CM218
	Crugiau Merched Cairns	Round cairn	Cilycwm	52.0934°N 3.8667°W, SN722455		Prehistoric	CM302
	Nantiwrch round barrow	Round barrow	Cilycwm	52.0386°N 3.8817°W, SN710394		Prehistoric	CM360
	Troedrhiwhir Mountain ring cairn	Ring cairn	Cilycwm	52.1139°N 3.8292°W, SN748477		Prehistoric	CM352
	Cairn Circle 585m NE of Meini Gwyr	Round barrow	Cilymaenllwyd	51.9107°N 4.6973°W, SN145270		Prehistoric	CM050
	Castell Garw	Henge	Cilymaenllwyd	51.9098°N 4.695°W, SN147269		Prehistoric	CM245
	Earthwork 125m South West of Meini Gwyr	Ring cairn	Cilymaenllwyd	51.9058°N 4.7039°W, SN140264		Prehistoric	CM247
	Meini Gwyr	Henge	Cilymaenllwyd	51.9069°N 4.7031°W, SN141266		Prehistoric	CM051
	Pant y Menyn Round Barrow	Round barrow	Cilymaenllwyd	51.9023°N 4.6998°W, SN143260		Prehistoric	CM311
	Round Barrow SE of Goodwins Row, Efailwen	Round barrow	Cilymaenllwyd	51.9014°N 4.7061°W, SN139259		Prehistoric	CM244
	Tumulus N of Goodwins Row, Efailwen	Ring cairn	Cilymaenllwyd	51.9037°N 4.7054°W, SN139262		Prehistoric	CM246
	Crugiau Round Barrows	Round barrow	Clynderwen	51.8523°N 4.7271°W, SN122205		Prehistoric	CM309
	Banc Crucorford round cairn	Round cairn	Cwmamman	51.8256°N 3.9313°W, SN670158		Prehistoric	CM326
	Bancbryn cairn cemetery	Round cairn	Cwmamman	51.7751°N 3.9048°W, SN686102		Prehistoric	CM333
	Bancbryn cairn cemetery [east]	Round cairn	Cwmamman	51.7726°N 3.897°W, SN692099		Prehistoric	CM335
	Bancbryn platform cairn	Platform Cairn	Cwmamman	51.7732°N 3.9008°W, SN689099		Prehistoric	CM334
	Bodyst-uchaf ring cairn	Ring cairn	Cwmamman	51.7918°N 3.9401°W, SN662121		Prehistoric	CM330
	Round Cairns 430m North West of Henrhyd	Round cairn	Cwmamman	51.7756°N 3.9294°W, SN669103		Prehistoric	CM178
	Carn Wen Round Barrow	Round barrow	Cynwyl Elfed	51.9811°N 4.3326°W, SN398339		Prehistoric	CM111
	Crug Bach Round Barrow	Round barrow	Cynwyl Elfed	51.9779°N 4.3399°W, SN393336		Prehistoric	CM112
	Crug Fach Round Barrow	Round barrow	Cynwyl Elfed	51.9586°N 4.3357°W, SN396314		Prehistoric	CM118
	Crug Glas Round Barrow	Round barrow	Cynwyl Elfed	51.9767°N 4.3438°W, SN391334		Prehistoric	CM113
	Crug Ieuan Round Barrow	Round barrow	Cynwyl Elfed	51.9539°N 4.457°W, SN312312		Prehistoric	CM092
	Nant-Gronw Round Barrows	Round barrow	Cynwyl Elfed	51.9687°N 4.3858°W, SN362327		Prehistoric	CM109
	Banc Maes-yr-Haidd barrows	Round barrow	Cynwyl Gaeo	52.0699°N 3.9039°W, SN696429		Prehistoric	CM339
	Bryn Bedd round barrow	Round barrow	Cynwyl Gaeo	52.1091°N 3.9416°W, SN671474		Prehistoric	CM365
	Cairn Groups on Garn Fawr	Ring cairn	Cynwyl Gaeo	52.1156°N 3.863°W, SN725480		Prehistoric	CM224
Carn Fawr, a large cairn near the summit of Bryn Mawr	Carn Fawr Round Cairn	Round cairn	Cynwyl Gaeo	52.1346°N 3.9463°W, SN668502		Prehistoric	CM169
	Carn Nant-yr-ast round cairn	Round cairn	Cynwyl Gaeo	52.1287°N 3.8698°W, SN721494		Prehistoric	CM364
	Cefn y Bryn Ring Cairn	Ring cairn	Cynwyl Gaeo	52.0724°N 3.8805°W, SN712432		Prehistoric	CM304
	Craig Twrch round cairn	Round cairn	Cynwyl Gaeo	52.124°N 3.957°W, SN661491		Prehistoric	CM363
Bedd y Milwr (The Soldier's Grave), Esgair Fraith	Esgair Ffraith Round Cairns	Round cairn	Cynwyl Gaeo	52.1158°N 3.9757°W, SN648482		Prehistoric	CM168
	Pen Cerrigdiddos Round Cairns	Round barrow	Cynwyl Gaeo	52.0747°N 3.8802°W, SN712434		Prehistoric	CM305
	Burnt Mound 450m ENE of Caeglas Farm	Burnt mound	Dyffryn Cennen	51.8701°N 3.985°W, SN634209		Prehistoric	CM286
	Tair Carn Isaf Cairns	Round cairn	Dyffryn Cennen	51.8336°N 3.9125°W, SN683167		Prehistoric	CM256
	Two Burnt Mounds 350m W of Cwrtbrynbeirdd	Burnt mound	Dyffryn Cennen	51.8461°N 3.9368°W, SN666181		Prehistoric	CM287
	Castle Heli Mound	Round barrow	Eglwyscummin	51.7641°N 4.6193°W, SN193105		Prehistoric	CM088
	Garness Farm, round barrow 400m to SW of	Round barrow	Eglwyscummin	51.7406°N 4.5897°W, SN212078		Prehistoric	CM321
	Ring Cairn 120m NE of Heol Ddu	Ring cairn	Gorslas	51.8166°N 4.1179°W, SN541152		Prehistoric	CM230
	Crug Elwin Round Barrow	Round barrow	Llanboidy	51.9304°N 4.5687°W, SN234288		Prehistoric	CM130
	Crug Hywel Round Barrow	Round barrow	Llanboidy	51.9087°N 4.5978°W, SN214265		Prehistoric	CM132
	Lan Round Barrows	Round barrow	Llanboidy	51.8914°N 4.6067°W, SN207246		Prehistoric	CM187
	Pant-Glas Round Barrow	Round barrow	Llanboidy	51.9049°N 4.5964°W, SN214261		Prehistoric	CM133
	Two Round Barrows near Crossroads N of Eglwsfair-a-Churig Church	Round barrow	Llanboidy	51.9119°N 4.6163°W, SN201269		Prehistoric	CM134
	Arhosfa'r Garreg-lwyd barrow	Round barrow	Llanddeusant	51.9224°N 3.7494°W, SN797263		Prehistoric	CM337
	Carn y Gigfran	Round cairn	Llanddeusant	51.8819°N 3.777°W, SN777218		Prehistoric	CM259
	Carnau'r Gareg Las	Round cairn	Llanddeusant	51.8677°N 3.7772°W, SN777202		Prehistoric	CM258
	Cilgerddan ring cairn	Ring cairn	Llanddeusant	51.9225°N 3.8134°W, SN753264		Prehistoric	CM329
	Picws Du cairn	Round cairn	Llanddeusant	51.8826°N 3.7278°W, SN811218		Prehistoric	CM336
	Stone Setting on Waun Llwyd	Stone circle	Llanddeusant	51.9052°N 3.7333°W, SN808243		Prehistoric	CM260
	Two Cairns on Fan Foel	Round cairn	Llanddeusant, (also Llywel), (see also Powys)	51.8871°N 3.7138°W, SN821223		Prehistoric	BR275
	Castle-Lloyd Round Barrow	Round barrow	Llanddowror	51.7639°N 4.5466°W, SN243103		Prehistoric	CM140
	Little Mountain Round Barrow	Round barrow	Llanddowror	51.769°N 4.5135°W, SN266108		Prehistoric	CM135
	Group of Burnt Mounds 300m SSW of Cilcoll Farm	Burnt mound	Llandybie	51.8219°N 3.9961°W, SN625155		Prehistoric	CM284
	Two Burnt Mounds 600m ESE of Rhyd-y-Ffynnon Farm	Burnt mound	Llandybie	51.8481°N 4.0125°W, SN614185		Prehistoric	CM285
	Crugiau Round Barrows	Round cairn	Llanegwad	51.9352°N 4.1832°W, SN500285		Prehistoric	CM201
	Ffynnon-Newydd Standing Stones	Henge	Llanegwad	51.8687°N 4.1881°W, SN494211		Prehistoric	CM042
	Maes y Crug round barrow	Round barrow	Llanegwad	51.8654°N 4.1862°W, SN495207		Prehistoric	CM328
	Bryn-Poeth-Uchaf, ring cairn to ESE of	Ring cairn	Llanfair-ar-y-bryn	52.08°N 3.7516°W, SN800438		Prehistoric	CM345
	Bryn-Poeth-Uchaf, ring cairn to NE of	Ring cairn	Llanfair-ar-y-bryn	52.084°N 3.7541°W, SN799443		Prehistoric	CM344
	Carn Twrch round cairn	Round cairn	Llanfair-ar-y-bryn	52.1021°N 3.7485°W, SN803463		Prehistoric	CM342
	Carn Wen round cairn	Round cairn	Llanfair-ar-y-bryn	52.0927°N 3.7557°W, SN798452		Prehistoric	CM340
	Cerrig Cedny round cairn	Round cairn	Llanfair-ar-y-bryn	52.104°N 3.7513°W, SN801465		Prehistoric	CM341
	Nant Gwyn, round cairn and standing stone to S of	Round cairn	Llanfair-ar-y-bryn	52.0726°N 3.7619°W, SN793430		Prehistoric	CM343
	Stone Circle 200m SW of Cerrig Cynant	Stone circle	Llanfair-ar-y-bryn	52.0826°N 3.7509°W, SN801441		Prehistoric	CM225
	Burnt Mound 250m S of Cwm	Burnt mound	Llanfihangel Aberbythych	51.8501°N 4.0156°W, SN612187		Prehistoric	CM289
	Cairn 150m ESE of Garnbig	Round cairn	Llanfihangel Aberbythych	51.823°N 4.0572°W, SN583158		Prehistoric	CM269
	Crug y Biswal Round Barrow	Round barrow	Llanfihangel Rhos-y-Corn	52.0276°N 4.1622°W, SN517387		Prehistoric	CM075
	Crugiau Edryd Round Barrows	Round barrow	Llanfihangel Rhos-y-Corn	52.0343°N 4.1374°W, SN534394		Prehistoric	CM073
	Mynydd Llanfihangel Rhos-y-Corn Round Barrow	Round barrow	Llanfihangel Rhos-y-Corn	51.9974°N 4.1829°W, SN502354		Prehistoric	CM164
	Crug 460m WSW of Brynamlwg, Pencader	Ring cairn	Llanfihangel-ar-Arth	52.0017°N 4.288°W, SN430361		Prehistoric	CM036
	Crug y Bedw, S of Blaen-Rhyd-Fedw	Round barrow	Llanfihangel-ar-Arth	51.9969°N 4.1932°W, SN495354		Prehistoric	CM035
	Crugiau Rhos-Wen	Round barrow	Llanfihangel-ar-Arth	51.9789°N 4.2162°W, SN478334		Prehistoric	CM033
	Crugyn Amlwg, Mynydd Trebeddau	Round barrow	Llanfihangel-ar-Arth	51.9868°N 4.206°W, SN486343		Prehistoric	CM034
	Carreg Castell-y-Gwynt Burial Chamber	Round cairn	Llanfynydd	51.9545°N 4.1095°W, SN551305		Prehistoric	CM044
	Y Garn Ring Cairn	Ring cairn	Llanfynydd	51.958°N 4.0951°W, SN561309		Prehistoric	CM229
	Burnt Mound 500m ESE of Llwyn Wennol	Burnt mound	Llangadog	51.8745°N 3.8086°W, SN755210		Prehistoric	CM288
	Carn Pen-Rhiw-Ddu	Round cairn	Llangadog	51.8542°N 3.8491°W, SN727189		Prehistoric	CM172
	Carn Pen-y-Clogau	Round cairn	Llangadog	51.8512°N 3.8642°W, SN716185		Prehistoric	CM257
	Tair Carn Uchaf Cairns	Round cairn	Llangadog	51.8397°N 3.8977°W, SN693173		Prehistoric	CM255
	Trichrug round cairns	Round cairn	Llangadog	51.8898°N 3.8914°W, SN699229		Prehistoric	CM327
	Crug Perfa Round Barrow	Round barrow	Llangeler	51.9813°N 4.3955°W, SN355341		Prehistoric	CM104
	Crug Tarw	Round barrow	Llangeler	51.9869°N 4.3724°W, SN371347		Prehistoric	CM103
	Crug y Gorllwyn Round Barrow	Round barrow	Llangeler	51.982°N 4.4029°W, SN350342		Prehistoric	CM105
	Nant Sais Round Barrow	Round barrow	Llangeler	51.9794°N 4.4132°W, SN343339		Prehistoric	CM106
	Round Cairns & Standing Stone SW of Blaen-Nant-Rhys	Round cairn	Llangeler	51.9996°N 4.3171°W, SN410359		Prehistoric	CM066
	Crug-y-rhud-hir round barrow	Round barrow	Llanllawddog	51.9218°N 4.2202°W, SN474271		Prehistoric	CM319
	Crugiau Leir Round Barrows	Round barrow	Llanllwni	52.0123°N 4.185°W, SN501371		Prehistoric	CM163
	Derlwyn round barrow cemetery	Round barrow	Llanllwni	52.0469°N 4.1615°W, SN518409		Prehistoric	CM312
	Ring Cairn 50m North of Crug y Biswal	Round cairn	Llanllwni	52.0281°N 4.1622°W, SN517388		Prehistoric	CM076
	Banc Round Barrow	Round barrow	Llanpumsaint	51.9209°N 4.3209°W, SN404272		Prehistoric	CM120
	Bwlch-Bychan Round Barrow	Round barrow	Llanpumsaint	51.9249°N 4.3191°W, SN406276		Prehistoric	CM119
	Crug Gwyn Round Barrow	Round barrow	Llanpumsaint	51.9638°N 4.3294°W, SN400320		Prehistoric	CM117
	Crugiau Fach Round Barrows	Round barrow	Llanpumsaint	51.9691°N 4.3233°W, SN405326		Prehistoric	CM116
	Gilfach-Fach Round Barrow	Round barrow	Llanpumsaint	51.9725°N 4.3193°W, SN407329		Prehistoric	CM115
	Mynydd Llansadwrn ring cairn	Ring cairn	Llansadwrn	51.9944°N 3.9124°W, SN687346		Prehistoric	CM362
	Crug y Bwdran	Round barrow	Llanybydder	52.0357°N 4.106°W, SN556395		Prehistoric	CM074
	Pen Lan round barrow cemetery	Round barrow	Llanybydder	52.0709°N 4.1251°W, SN544435		Prehistoric	CM313
	Three Round Cairns SE of Blaen Carreg	Round cairn	Llanybydder	52.0771°N 4.1125°W, SN553441		Prehistoric	CM084
	Careg-y-Bwci	Round barrow	Llanycrwys	52.1129°N 3.979°W, SN645479		Prehistoric	CD156
	Mynydd Myddfai ring cairn	Ring cairn	Myddfai	51.9563°N 3.731°W, SN811300		Prehistoric	CM346
	Mynydd Myddfai round barrow	Round barrow	Myddfai	51.9526°N 3.7386°W, SN806296		Prehistoric	CM348
	Mynydd Myddfai round cairn	Round cairn	Myddfai	51.9433°N 3.7504°W, SN797286		Prehistoric	CM351
	Mynydd Myddfai, ring cairns on W end of	Ring cairn	Myddfai	51.9455°N 3.7548°W, SN794289		Prehistoric	CM349
	Pen Caenewydd ring cairn	Ring cairn	Myddfai	51.9463°N 3.7594°W, SN791289		Prehistoric	CM350
	Tomen y Rhos round cairn	Round cairn	Myddfai	51.9543°N 3.7352°W, SN808298		Prehistoric	CM347
	Burnt Mound West of Derllys Court	Burnt mound	Newchurch and Merthyr	51.8561°N 4.394°W, SN352202		Prehistoric	CM297
	Garn-Fawr Tumuli & Enclosure	Round barrow	Newchurch and Merthyr	51.8932°N 4.3313°W, SN396241		Prehistoric	CM038
Round barrow at Gelli Dewi Uchaf	Gelli Dewi Uchaf linear round barrow cemetery	Round barrow	Pencarreg	52.0745°N 4.0561°W, SN591437		Prehistoric	CM315
	Carn Fadog round cairn	Round cairn	Quarter Bach	51.8399°N 3.7888°W, SN768172		Prehistoric	CM356
	Bryn Helyg Round Barrow	Round barrow	St Clears	51.807°N 4.4715°W, SN297149		Prehistoric	CM308
	Eithin Bach round barrow	Round barrow	St Clears	51.815°N 4.5036°W, SN275158		Prehistoric	CM322
	Round Barrow 330m SW of Mynydd-Uchaf	Round barrow	St Ishmael	51.7652°N 4.3321°W, SN391099		Prehistoric	CM190
	Crug Ebolion	Round barrow	Trelech, (also Clydey), (see also Pembrokeshire)	51.9578°N 4.5194°W, SN269318		Prehistoric	CM093
	Crug Glas Round Barrow	Round barrow	Trelech	51.9554°N 4.4789°W, SN297314		Prehistoric	CM091
	Crug y Deyrn Burial Chamber	Round barrow	Trelech	51.8974°N 4.4817°W, SN293250		Prehistoric	CM127
	Garreg Wen round barrow	Round barrow	Trelech	51.9608°N 4.4882°W, SN291320		Prehistoric	CM318
	Trichrug Round Barrows	Round barrow	Trelech	51.957°N 4.4826°W, SN295316		Prehistoric	CM090
	Defended Enclosure 300m W of Pant-glas	Promontory fort - inland	Abergwili	51.9026°N 4.2222°W, SN472250		Prehistoric	CM382
	Merlins Hill Hillfort	Hillfort	Abergwili	51.8707°N 4.246°W, SN454215		Prehistoric	CM231
	Pen y Gaer Hillfort	Hillfort	Abernant	51.8827°N 4.3901°W, SN355231		Prehistoric	CM207
	Defended Enclosure 350m S of Clungwyn	Enclosure - Defensive	Bronwydd	51.8872°N 4.3101°W, SN411234		Prehistoric	CM376
	Y Gaer Defended Enclosure	Enclosure - Defensive	Pembrey and Burry Port Town	51.6907°N 4.2409°W, SN452014		Prehistoric	CM384
	Defended Enclosure 300m NW of Closbach	Promontory fort - inland	Cilymaenllwyd	51.8644°N 4.6943°W, SN145218		Prehistoric	CM380
	Earthworks SE of Clyn-Derwen	Enclosure	Clynderwen	51.8374°N 4.7255°W, SN123189		Prehistoric	CM065
	Llandre Entrenchment	Enclosure	Clynderwen	51.8486°N 4.7678°W, SN094202		Prehistoric	CM089
	Portis-Parc Camp	Enclosure	Clynderwen	51.875°N 4.7153°W, SN131230		Prehistoric	CM100
	Garreg Las Hut Group	Enclosed hut circle	Dyffryn Cennen	51.8414°N 3.9288°W, SN672176		Prehistoric	CM204
	Pen-Coed Camp	Promontory fort - inland	Eglwyscummin	51.7861°N 4.5456°W, SN245127		Prehistoric	CM142
	The Castle, Woodreefe	Promontory fort - inland	Eglwyscummin	51.7459°N 4.6314°W, SN184085		Prehistoric	CM253
	Top Castle	Ringwork	Eglwyscummin	51.739°N 4.6162°W, SN194077		Prehistoric	CM039
	Llangan Church Cropmark Enclosure	Enclosure	Henllanfallteg	51.8368°N 4.6468°W, SN177186		Prehistoric	CM264
	Hillslope Enclosure E of Glan y Mor	Enclosure	Laugharne Township	51.7736°N 4.4563°W, SN306111		Prehistoric	CM232
	Gelli Diogyn Hillfort	Hillfort	Llanboidy	51.8623°N 4.6176°W, SN198214		Prehistoric	CM293
	Hafod Camp	Promontory fort - inland	Llanboidy	51.8729°N 4.5899°W, SN218225		Prehistoric	CM166
	Pen-Gaer Promontory fort	Promontory fort - inland	Llanboidy	51.8862°N 4.6421°W, SN182241		Prehistoric	CM214
	Castle-Lloyd Camp	Promontory fort - inland	Llanddowror	51.7547°N 4.5499°W, SN240092		Prehistoric	CM141
	Pant-Glas Camp	Promontory fort - inland	Llanddowror	51.7637°N 4.5243°W, SN258102		Prehistoric	CM137
	Parc-Cynog Camp	Promontory fort - inland	Llanddowror	51.7596°N 4.5305°W, SN254097		Prehistoric	CM138
	Ynys-y-Borde Earthwork	Enclosure	Llandovery	51.9978°N 3.7597°W, SN792347		Prehistoric	CM162
	Allt-y-Ferin Mound and Bailey Castle	Hillfort	Llanegwad	51.8884°N 4.1491°W, SN521232		Prehistoric	CM157
	Cefn Pal Defended Enclosure	Enclosure - Defensive	Llanfair-ar-y-Bryn	52.028°N 3.7467°W, SN802380		Prehistoric	CM379
	Pen y Garn Camp	Hillfort	Llanfihangel Aberbythych	51.8513°N 4.0684°W, SN576189		Prehistoric	CM150
	Craig Gwrtheyrn	Hillfort	Llanfihangel-ar-Arth	52.0386°N 4.2858°W, SN433402		Prehistoric	CM023
	Dyffryn Camp	Hillfort	Llanfynydd	51.9184°N 4.1231°W, SN540265		Prehistoric	CM156
	Cwmdu Defended Enclosure	Enclosure - Defensive	Llangadog	51.8941°N 3.9178°W, SN681234		Prehistoric	CM385
	Garn Goch Camps	Hillfort	Llangadog	51.9018°N 3.9061°W, SN689243		Prehistoric	CM037
	Llwyn Du Camp	Hillfort	Llangadog	51.9034°N 3.9205°W, SN679245		Prehistoric	CM010
	Grongaer	Hillfort	Llangathen	51.8747°N 4.0734°W, SN573216		Prehistoric	CM082
	Defended Enclosure 500m NNE of Blaen-maenog	Promontory fort - inland	Llangeler	51.995°N 4.3864°W, SN362356		Prehistoric	CM377
	Panthir Defended Enclosure	Enclosure - Defensive	Llangeler	51.9798°N 4.3721°W, SN371339		Prehistoric	CM386
	Bwlch Seiri Camp	Enclosure	Llangynog	51.8264°N 4.4244°W, SN330169		Prehistoric	CM179
	Castell Pyr	Promontory fort - inland	Llanllwni	52.0372°N 4.2339°W, SN468399		Prehistoric	CM081
	Defended Enclosure 300m W of Pen y Gar	Promontory fort - inland	Llanpumsaint	51.9244°N 4.3368°W, SN394276		Prehistoric	CM381
	Cwm-Bran Camp	Enclosure	Llansadwrn	51.9655°N 3.8852°W, SN705313		Prehistoric	CM171
	Fan Camp	Hillfort	Llansadwrn	51.9655°N 3.9303°W, SN674314		Prehistoric	CM170
	Castle Cogan	Enclosure	Llansteffan	51.7993°N 4.4269°W, SN327139		Prehistoric	CM083
	Pencastell Hillfort	Hillfort	Llanwinio	51.9321°N 4.5363°W, SN257289		Prehistoric	CM295
	Pen y Gaer	Hillfort	Llanybydder	52.0695°N 4.155°W, SN523434		Prehistoric	CM101
	Maes y Castell	Hillfort	Manordeilo and Salem	51.9331°N 3.992°W, SN631279		Prehistoric	CM149
	Bron-y-Gaer Camp	Hillfort	Meidrim	51.8462°N 4.4594°W, SN306192		Prehistoric	CM148
	Castell-y-Gaer	Enclosure	Newchurch and Merthyr	51.8497°N 4.4054°W, SN344195		Prehistoric	CM024
	Court Wood Enclosure 500m SSW of Pen-Llwyn-Isaf	Enclosure	Pembrey and Burry Port Town	51.6949°N 4.2805°W, SN424020		Prehistoric	CM221
	Garreg Lwyd Enclosure 600m SE of Crosslane Cottages	Enclosure	Pembrey and Burry Port Town	51.6951°N 4.2856°W, SN421020		Prehistoric	CM222
	Caer Pencarreg	Hillfort	Pencarreg	52.0785°N 4.0598°W, SN589442		Prehistoric	CM173
	Napps Camp	Promontory fort - coastal	Pendine	51.7392°N 4.5676°W, SN228076		Prehistoric	CM019
	Castell Mawr	Enclosure	Trelech	51.92°N 4.5151°W, SN271275		Prehistoric	CM126

Scheduled prehistoric Monuments in Carmarthenshire, Wales.
=Burial sites =Chambered tombs & Standing stones =Hillforts etc

== See also ==
- List of Cadw properties
- List of castles in Wales
- List of hill forts in Wales
- Historic houses in Wales
- List of monastic houses in Wales
- List of museums in Wales
- List of Roman villas in Wales
