= Lists of scheduled monuments in Wales =

Scheduled monuments (also known as scheduled ancient monuments, or SAMs) are sites of archaeological importance with specific legal protection against damage or development.

The list of such monuments in Wales is maintained by Cadw: Welsh Historic Monuments, an executive agency within the Welsh National Assembly. For an archaeological site in Wales to be scheduled it must be a site of national importance, being a site that characterises a period or category in Welsh history, with consideration given to rarity, good documentation, group value, survival/condition, fragility/vulnerability, diversity and potential. In addition to the scheduling information that Cadw maintains, there are much larger pools of information on scheduled and other archaeological and historic sites, buildings and landscapes of Wales held by the Royal Commission on the Ancient and Historical Monuments of Wales and the four Welsh Archaeological Trusts.

On the list produced by Cadw dated May 2012, there were 4,186 scheduled monuments in Wales, distributed among all 22 principal areas of Wales. 39 sites cross a border between two authorities, (ridge-top cairns, bridges and aqueducts, cross dykes, tramroads) so are included in both lists. The lists below show these sites, arranged by principal areas (counties and county boroughs), and in the case of the larger counties, sub-divided to maintain a manageable number of sites per page.

== Lists of scheduled monuments ==
- List of scheduled monuments in Blaenau Gwent (13 sites)
- List of scheduled monuments in Bridgend County Borough (59 sites)
- List of scheduled monuments in Caerphilly County Borough (46 sites)
- List of scheduled monuments in Cardiff (28 sites)
- Scheduled monuments in Carmarthenshire (370 sites)

List of prehistoric scheduled monuments in Carmarthenshire (227 sites)
List of Roman-to-modern scheduled monuments in Carmarthenshire (143 sites)

- Scheduled monuments in Ceredigion (264 sites)

List of prehistoric scheduled monuments in Ceredigion (163 sites)
List of Roman-to-modern scheduled monuments in Ceredigion (101 sites)

- List of scheduled monuments in Conwy County Borough (161 sites)
- List of scheduled monuments in Denbighshire (168 sites)
- List of scheduled monuments in Flintshire (131 sites)
- Scheduled monuments in Gwynedd (501 sites)

List of prehistoric scheduled monuments in Gwynedd (former Caernarvonshire) (194 sites)
List of prehistoric scheduled monuments in Gwynedd (former Merionethshire) (171 sites)
List of Roman-to-modern scheduled monuments in Gwynedd (136 sites)

- List of scheduled monuments in Isle of Anglesey (143 sites)
- List of scheduled monuments in Merthyr Tydfil County Borough (42 sites)
- List of scheduled monuments in Monmouthshire (200 sites)
- List of scheduled monuments in Neath Port Talbot (94 sites)
- List of scheduled monuments in Newport (71 sites)
- Scheduled monuments in Pembrokeshire (528 sites)

List of prehistoric scheduled monuments in north Pembrokeshire (233 sites)
List of prehistoric scheduled monuments in south Pembrokeshire (113 sites)
List of Roman-to-modern scheduled monuments in Pembrokeshire (182 sites)

- Scheduled monuments in Powys (950 sites)

List of prehistoric scheduled monuments in Powys (Montgomeryshire) (190 sites)
List of Roman-to-modern scheduled monuments in Powys (Montgomeryshire) (112 sites)
List of prehistoric scheduled monuments in Powys (Radnorshire) (139 sites)
List of Roman-to-modern scheduled monuments in Powys (Radnorshire) (119 sites)
List of prehistoric scheduled monuments in Powys (Brecknockshire) (254 sites)
List of Roman-to-modern scheduled monuments in Powys (Brecknockshire) (136 sites)

- List of scheduled monuments in Rhondda Cynon Taf (89 sites)
- List of scheduled monuments in Swansea (124 sites)
- List of scheduled monuments in Torfaen (25 sites)
- List of scheduled monuments in the Vale of Glamorgan (110 sites)
- List of scheduled monuments in Wrexham County Borough (107 sites)

== See also ==
- List of Cadw properties
- List of hill forts in Wales
- List of Roman villas in Wales
- List of castles in Wales
- Historic houses in Wales
- List of monastic houses in Wales
- List of museums in Wales
- Listed buildings in Wales
