= Scheduled monuments in Pembrokeshire =

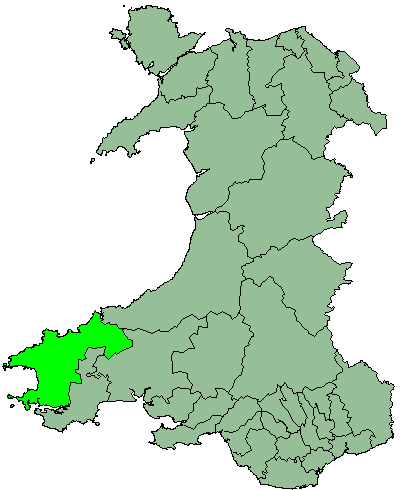
north Pembrokeshire area

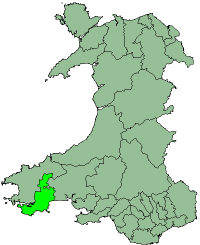
south Pembrokeshire area

Pembrokeshire is the fifth-largest county in Wales, but has more scheduled monuments (526) than any except Powys. This gives it an extremely high density of monuments, with 33.4 per 100 km^{2}. (Only the tiny county boroughs of Newport and Merthyr Tydfil have a higher density). With three-quarters of its boundary being coastline, Pembrokeshire occupies the western end of the West Wales peninsular, terminating with the tiny cathedral city of St David's. It was a historic county in its own right but between 1975 and 1996 it joined Carmarthen and Ceredigion in the much larger county of Dyfed.

Over two thirds of Pembrokeshire's scheduled monuments (346) date to pre-historic times. Even this is too many entries to conveniently show in one list, so the list is subdivided into three, separating the Roman to modern on one list, and subdividing the prehistoric sites along the lines of the former local districts of Preseli Pembrokeshire, (the northern half) and South Pembrokeshire. (These former districts ceased to exist as administrative units in 1996 when Pembrokeshire became a unitary authority, but the boundaries are a convenient way to sub-divide the list.)

There are 233 prehistoric scheduled sites in the northern area. They include hill forts, promontory forts on both coastal headlands and inland locations. It also includes a variety of enclosures, hut sites and Raths, a wide range of burial sites and other ritual and religious sites listed as barrows and chambered tombs, stone circles and standing stones. The list of 113 prehistoric sites in south Pembrokeshire contains a similar range.

The whole county's 182 Roman, medieval and post-medieval sites are all included in the third Pembrokeshire list, which covers inscribed stones, stone crosses, holy wells, bridges, castles, mottes and baileys, priories, chapels and churches, houses, town walls and a Bishop's palace, along with a wide variety of post-medieval sites from coalmines, kilns and dovecotes through to World War II defensive structures.

Scheduled monuments have statutory protection. The compilation of the list is undertaken by Cadw Welsh Historic Monuments, which is an executive agency of the National Assembly of Wales. The list of scheduled monuments below is supplied by Cadw with additional material from Royal Commission on the Ancient and Historical Monuments of Wales and Dyfed Archaeological Trust.

- List of prehistoric scheduled monuments in north Pembrokeshire
- List of prehistoric scheduled monuments in south Pembrokeshire
- List of Roman-to-modern scheduled monuments in Pembrokeshire

== See also ==
- Lists of scheduled monuments in Wales
