= Moridunum (Carmarthen) =

Roman settlement at what is now Carmarthen in Wales

- Carmarthen; Moridunum Demetarum
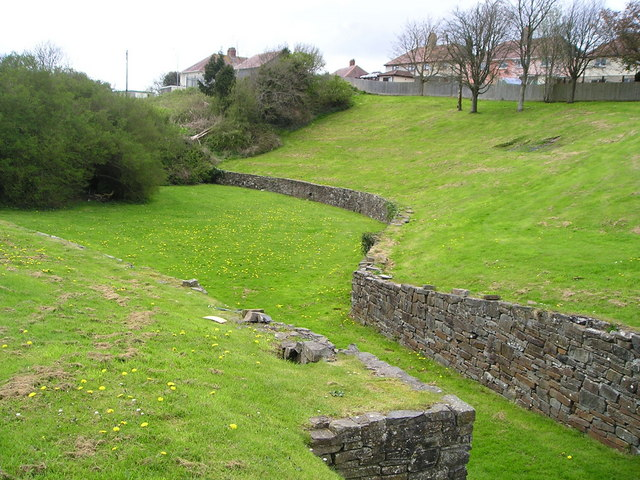
- Roman amphitheatre at Carmarthen

- Location within Carmarthenshire
- 51.86°N 4.31°W
- Location: Carmarthen, Carmarthenshire, Wales

History
- Founded: c. 75 AD

Moridunum was a Roman fort and town in the Roman province of Britannia. Today it is known as Carmarthen, located in the Welsh county of Carmarthenshire (formerly in the county of Dyfed).

== Fort ==
Moridunum (lit. "sea fort") was the civitas capital of the Demetae tribe in Roman Wales and was recorded by Ptolemy and in the Antonine Itinerary. The initial fort is believed to date from about AD 75, possibly replacing the hillfort on Merlin's Hill. The fort lasted until about 120, when the associated civilian vicus took over and the place became a town.

A map from 1723 by William Stukeley places Mori dunum (Caermarthen) at the western extremity of the network of Roman roads in Southern Wales.

== Town ==
A street-grid was laid out in the town and a public bath house built, and possibly a mansio. The forum and basilica were probably under the most built-up area of the present town on the cardo or main street. There were narrow shops fronting the streets, as well as evidence of metalworking. Large domestic homes of timber were rebuilt in stone in the late 3rd or early 4th century. A 1st/2nd century Romano-Celtic style temple has also been excavated. A turf bank and ditch was erected around the town in the mid-2nd century and a stone wall added some time later.

== Amphitheatre ==
East of the old town is one of only seven surviving Roman amphitheatres in the United Kingdom (51.8621°N 4.2964°W). It has the only above-ground Roman remains in the town, and was excavated in 1968. The arena itself is 46 by 27 meters. The circumference of the cavea seating area is 92 by 67 meters It had stone walls and wooden seating and was much larger than would be expected for the size of the town.

== Post-Roman times ==
The addition of 'Caer' ("fort") gave the town its modern Welsh name 'Caerfyrddin' which was anglicized as 'Carmarthen'. A popular folk etymology interprets the name as "Fort of Myrddin" (Merlin), though Celticist A. O. H. Jarman suggests that instead the name Myrddin was derived from Carmarthen's name. Veprauskas has argued for the Post-Roman settlement's identification as the 'Cair Guorthigirn' ("Fort Vortigern") listed by Nennius among the 28 cities of Britain in his History of the Britains.

== See also ==
- Wales in the Roman era
- Scheduled Monuments in Carmarthenshire
