= List of prehistoric scheduled monuments in south Pembrokeshire =

Pembrokeshire is only the fifth-largest county in Wales, but contains the second largest number of scheduled monuments (526) after Powys. This gives it an extremely high density of monuments, with 33.4 per 100km2. (Only the tiny county boroughs of Newport and Merthyr Tydfil have a higher density). With three-quarters of its boundary being coastline, Pembrokeshire occupies the western end of the West Wales peninsular, terminating with the tiny cathedral city of St David's. It was a historic county in its own right but between 1975 and 1996 it joined Carmarthen and Ceredigion in the much larger county of Dyfed.

Over two-thirds of Pembrokeshire's scheduled monuments (346) date to pre-historic times. Even this is too many entries to conveniently show in one list, so the list is subdivided into three, separating the Roman to modern on one list, and subdividing the prehistoric sites along the lines of the former local districts of Preseli Pembrokeshire, (the northern half) and South Pembrokeshire. The list below shows the 112 sites in the south. This includes hill forts, promontory forts on both coastal headlands and inland locations. It also includes a variety of enclosures, hut sites and Raths, a wide range of burial sites and other ritual and religious sites listed as barrows and chambered tombs, stone circles and standing stones. There is a matching list of 233 prehistoric sites in north Pembrokeshire

The county's 182 Roman, medieval and post-medieval sites are all included in the third Pembrokeshire list, which covers inscribed stones, stone crosses, holy wells, castles, mottes and baileys, priories, chapels and churches, houses, town walls and a Bishop's palace, along with a wide variety of post-medieval sites from coalmines, kilns and dovecotes through to World War II defensive structures.

Scheduled monuments have statutory protection. The compilation of the list is undertaken by Cadw Welsh Historic Monuments, which is an executive agency of the National Assembly of Wales. The list of scheduled monuments below is supplied by Cadw with additional material from RCAHMW and Dyfed Archaeological Trust.

== Prehistoric scheduled monuments in south Pembrokeshire ==
Image	Name	Site type	Community	Location	Details	Period	Schedule No & Refs
	Trelissey	Enclosure - Defensive	Amroth	51.7395°N 4.6449°W, SN174078	Circular enclosure with a Roman villa inside the banks	Prehistoric (Iron Age & Roman)	PE563
	Devil's Quoit Burial Chamber	Chambered tomb	Angle	51.6665°N 5.0576°W, SM886008		Prehistoric	PE020
	Promontory Fort at Sheep Island	Promontory fort - coastal	Angle	51.6735°N 5.1179°W, SM846018		Prehistoric	PE411
	West Pickard Camp	Promontory fort - coastal	Angle	51.6673°N 5.0923°W, SM862010		Prehistoric	PE167
	Rhos Goch Round Barrow	Round barrow	Boncath	51.9757°N 4.6258°W, SN197341		Prehistoric	PE324
	Round Barrow on E Slope of Freni Fawr	Round barrow	Boncath	51.9821°N 4.613°W, SN206347		Prehistoric	PE290
	Round Barrow on W Slope of Freni Fawr	Round barrow	Boncath	51.9858°N 4.6235°W, SN199351		Prehistoric	PE292
	Round Barrows on Summit of Freni Fawr	Round barrow	Boncath	51.9838°N 4.6186°W, SN202349		Prehistoric	PE291
	Carew Beacon Round Barrows	Round barrow	Carew	51.6716°N 4.8325°W, SN042008		Prehistoric	PE311
	Park Camp	Enclosure	Carew	51.709°N 4.8049°W, SN063048		Prehistoric	PE261
	Round Barrow 110m S W of the Hoyles	Round barrow	Carew	51.7005°N 4.7808°W, SN079038		Prehistoric	PE453
	Round Barrow N of Rosemary Lane	Round barrow	Carew	51.7167°N 4.8342°W, SN043058		Prehistoric	PE328
	Round Barrow S of Rosemary Lane	Round barrow	Carew	51.7127°N 4.8352°W, SN042053		Prehistoric	PE329
	Brownslade Round Barrow	Round barrow	Castlemartin	51.6348°N 5.0284°W, SR905972		Prehistoric	PE315
	Bulliber Camp (East)	Enclosure	Castlemartin	51.6285°N 5.0256°W, SR906965		Prehistoric	PE314
	Bulliber Hill Camp	Enclosure	Castlemartin	51.6291°N 5.0316°W, SR902966		Prehistoric	PE021
	Castlemartin Castle	Enclosure	Castlemartin	51.6457°N 5.0147°W, SR915984		Prehistoric	PE166
	Crocksydam Camp	Promontory fort - coastal	Castlemartin	51.61°N 4.9825°W, SR935943		Prehistoric	PE319
	Crow Back Tumulus	Round barrow	Castlemartin	51.6364°N 5.0509°W, SR889974		Prehistoric	PE467
	Flimston Bay Camp	Promontory fort - coastal	Castlemartin	51.6126°N 4.991°W, SR930946		Prehistoric	PE318
	Kings Mill Camp	Promontory fort - inland	Castlemartin	51.6497°N 5.002°W, SR924988		Prehistoric	PE245
	Linney Head Camp	Promontory fort - coastal	Castlemartin	51.6204°N 5.0517°W, SR888957		Prehistoric	PE316
	Linney Head Tumulus	Round barrow	Castlemartin	51.6317°N 5.0522°W, SR888969		Prehistoric	PE468
	Merrion Camp	Enclosure	Castlemartin	51.6391°N 4.9783°W, SR940975		Prehistoric	PE055
	Castell Blaidd Round Barrow	Round barrow	Clydey	51.9477°N 4.5612°W, SN240307		Prehistoric	PE207
	Crug Bach Round Barrow	Round barrow	Clydey	51.9612°N 4.5475°W, SN250322		Prehistoric	PE206
	Freni-Fach Round Barrow	Round barrow	Clydey	51.9838°N 4.5849°W, SN225348		Prehistoric	PE204
	Henfeddau Fawr Defended Enclosure	Enclosure - Defensive	Clydey	51.9549°N 4.5484°W, SN249315		Prehistoric	PE561
	Defended Enclosure 800m NNE of Upton Farm	Enclosure - Defensive	Cosheston	51.7136°N 4.8653°W, SN021055		Prehistoric	PE546
	Carn Ferched platform cairn	Platform Cairn	Crymych	51.9647°N 4.6902°W, SN152329		Prehistoric	PE499
Foel Drygarn camp	Foel Drygarn Camp	Hillfort	Crymych	51.9703°N 4.6833°W, SN157336		Prehistoric	PE010
	Gaer 270m W of Glan-Dwr Farm	Enclosure	Crymych	51.9232°N 4.6404°W, SN185282		Prehistoric	PE099
	Llanfyrnach Standing Stones	Standing stone	Crymych	51.9522°N 4.6099°W, SN207314		Prehistoric	PE351
	Round Barrow 270m SW of Crymych Arms	Round barrow	Crymych	51.9726°N 4.6491°W, SN181337		Prehistoric	PE325
	Bowett Wood Camp	Enclosure	Hundleton	51.6681°N 4.935°W, SM972007		Prehistoric	PE057
	Corston Beacon Round Barrow	Round barrow	Hundleton	51.6598°N 4.9897°W, SR933999		Prehistoric	PE059
	Dry Burrows Round Barrows	Round barrow	Hundleton	51.6587°N 4.9669°W, SR948997		Prehistoric	PE060
	Enclosure & Earthworks at Lewiston Hall	Enclosure	Hundleton	51.6881°N 5.0092°W, SM921031		Prehistoric	PE400
	Round Barrow 400m N of West Orielton	Round barrow	Hundleton	51.6556°N 4.9632°W, SR951993		Prehistoric	PE525
	Wallaston Round Barrows	Round barrow	Hundleton	51.6638°N 5°W, SM926003		Prehistoric	PE064
	West Pennar Camp	Enclosure	Hundleton	51.6879°N 4.9908°W, SM933030		Prehistoric	PE262
	West Popton Camp	Promontory fort - coastal	Hundleton	51.6938°N 5.0298°W, SM907038		Prehistoric	PE264
	Burnt Mound North of Dinaston Farm	Burnt mound	Jeffreyston	51.7636°N 4.7889°W, SN076108		Prehistoric	PE488
	Blaengwaith-Noah Camp	Promontory fort - inland	Lampeter Velfrey	51.7793°N 4.6807°W, SN151123		Prehistoric	PE085
	Castell Meherin Camps	Hillfort	Lampeter Velfrey	51.7738°N 4.6867°W, SN148117		Prehistoric	PE034
	Crug Swllt Round Barrow	Round barrow	Lampeter Velfrey	51.7797°N 4.6439°W, SN177124		Prehistoric	PE364
	Llan Burial Chamber	Chambered tomb	Lampeter Velfrey	51.7943°N 4.6882°W, SN147140		Prehistoric	PE026
	Llan-Marlais Round Barrow	Round barrow	Lampeter Velfrey	51.816°N 4.6441°W, SN178163		Prehistoric	PE327
	Longstone Camp	Enclosure	Lampeter Velfrey	51.7578°N 4.6821°W, SN150100		Prehistoric	PE179
	New House Round Barrows	Round barrow	Lampeter Velfrey	51.7715°N 4.6701°W, SN158114		Prehistoric	PE178
	Caerau Gaer	Rath	Llanddewi Velfrey	51.8125°N 4.6999°W, SN139161		Prehistoric	PE176
	Llanddewi Gaer	Promontory fort - inland	Llanddewi Velfrey	51.8124°N 4.6932°W, SN145161		Prehistoric	PE086
	Pengawse Ring Cairn	Ring barrow	Llanddewi Velfrey	51.8234°N 4.6539°W, SN172172		Prehistoric	PE390
	Castell Gwyn	Hillfort	Llandissilio West	51.8621°N 4.746°W, SN110217		Prehistoric	PE225
	Bush Inn Camp	Promontory fort - inland	Llawhaden	51.8053°N 4.7916°W, SN076155		Prehistoric	PE182
	Camp 200m NE of Stoneyford	Promontory fort - coastal	Llawhaden	51.8297°N 4.8017°W, SN070182		Prehistoric	PE105
	Camp 370m NE of Stoneyford	Enclosure	Llawhaden	51.8313°N 4.8006°W, SN071184		Prehistoric	PE104
	Camp 400m NW of Holgan	Promontory fort - inland	Llawhaden	51.829°N 4.7972°W, SN073181		Prehistoric	PE102
	Gelly Earthwork	Rath	Llawhaden	51.8429°N 4.7895°W, SN079197		Prehistoric	PE184
	Iron Age Hillslope Enclosure in Canaston Wood	Enclosure	Llawhaden	51.7927°N 4.7729°W, SN088141		Prehistoric	PE413
	Vaynor Gaer	Ringwork	Llawhaden	51.82°N 4.7665°W, SN094171		Prehistoric	PE115
	Budloy Standing Stone	Standing stone	Maenclochog	51.9217°N 4.8143°W, SN065285		Prehistoric	PE342
	Castell Vorlan	Promontory fort - inland	Maenclochog	51.905°N 4.775°W, SN091266		Prehistoric	PE284
	Cnwc Round Cairns	Round cairn	Maenclochog	51.938°N 4.7863°W, SN085302		Prehistoric	PE343
	Cornel-Bach Standing Stones	Standing stone	Maenclochog	51.9173°N 4.7907°W, SN081279		Prehistoric	PE286
	Eithbed Enclosure	Enclosure	Maenclochog	51.9238°N 4.793°W, SN080287		Prehistoric	PE119
	Foel Cwm-Cerwyn Round Cairns	Round cairn	Maenclochog	51.9468°N 4.7741°W, SN094312		Prehistoric	PE300
	Galchen-Fach Stone	Standing stone	Maenclochog	51.9158°N 4.7822°W, SN087278		Prehistoric	PE287
	Mynydd Crwn standing stone	Standing stone	Maenclochog	51.9339°N 4.7774°W, SN091297		Prehistoric	PE500
	Rhiwiau Round Barrow	Round barrow	Maenclochog	51.873°N 4.7677°W, SN096230		Prehistoric	PE344
	Standing Stone 300m WNW of Cilmoor	Standing stone	Maenclochog	51.9073°N 4.7925°W, SN080268		Prehistoric	PE521
	Standing Stone near Prysg Farm	Standing stone	Maenclochog	51.9099°N 4.7683°W, SN096271		Prehistoric	PE118
	Standing Stone S of Prysg Farm	Standing stone	Maenclochog	51.909°N 4.7701°W, SN095270		Prehistoric	PE409
	Temple Druid Standing Stone	Standing stone	Maenclochog	51.9102°N 4.7686°W, SN096271		Prehistoric	PE522
	Bier Hill Round Barrows	Round barrow	Manorbier	51.6665°N 4.7919°W, SN070001		Prehistoric	PE470
King's Quoit	King's Quoit Burial Chamber	Chambered tomb	Manorbier	51.6408°N 4.8059°W, SS059973		Prehistoric	PE035
	Old Castle Head Promontory Fort	Promontory fort - coastal	Manorbier	51.6359°N 4.7821°W, SS076966		Prehistoric	PE405
	Skomar Defended Enclosure	Promontory fort - coastal	Manorbier	51.6443°N 4.7691°W, SS085975		Prehistoric	PE545
	Carn Menyn Chambered Cairn	Chambered tomb	Mynachlog-Ddu	51.9609°N 4.708°W, SN140326		Prehistoric	PE498
	Gate Standing Stone	Standing stone	Mynachlog-Ddu	51.9393°N 4.7489°W, SN111303		Prehistoric	PE288
	Gors Fawr Stone Circle	Stone circle	Mynachlog-Ddu	51.9319°N 4.7144°W, SN134294		Prehistoric	PE117
	Mountain Burial Chamber	Chambered tomb	Mynachlog-Ddu	51.9638°N 4.6712°W, SN165328		Prehistoric	PE039
	Pencraig-Fawr Camp	Enclosure	Mynachlog-Ddu	51.9037°N 4.7369°W, SN118263		Prehistoric	PE285
	Rhos Fach standing stone pair	Stone Row	Mynachlog-Ddu	51.9416°N 4.7157°W, SN134304		Prehistoric	PE497
	Standing Stone 110m NW of Spring Gardens	Standing stone	Mynachlog-Ddu	51.9216°N 4.7442°W, SN114283		Prehistoric	PE406
	Standing Stone 600m E of Dolau-Newydd	Standing stone	Mynachlog-Ddu	51.9438°N 4.6752°W, SN162306		Prehistoric	PE523
	Ty-Newydd Standing Stones	Standing stone	Mynachlog-Ddu	51.9458°N 4.7394°W, SN118310		Prehistoric	PE121
	Waun Clyn-Coch Hut Group	Enclosure	Mynachlog-Ddu	51.9482°N 4.756°W, SN106313		Prehistoric	PE369
	Waun Lwyd Standing Stones	Standing stone	Mynachlog-Ddu	51.9493°N 4.682°W, SN158312		Prehistoric	PE116
	Redstone Cross Round Barrows	Round barrow	Narberth	51.8143°N 4.743°W, SN110164		Prehistoric	PE154
	Defended Enclosure 240m W of Velindre	Enclosure	New Moat	51.8959°N 4.8473°W, SN041257		Prehistoric	PE551
	Hill Slope Enclosure, 400m WNW of Parc Robert	Enclosure	New Moat	51.9006°N 4.8125°W, SN066261		Prehistoric	PE397
	Posty Defended Enclosure	Enclosure - Defensive	New Moat	51.8744°N 4.7989°W, SN074232		Prehistoric	PE559
	Rhyd-Brown Camp	Promontory fort - inland	New Moat	51.866°N 4.8093°W, SN066223		Prehistoric	PE269
	Kingston Burial Chamber	Chambered tomb	Pembroke	51.6558°N 4.9066°W, SR990992		Prehistoric	PE157
	Priory Farm Cave	Cave	Pembroke	51.6788°N 4.9248°W, SM978018		Prehistoric	PE435
	Hoyle Mouth Cave	Cave	Penally	51.6698°N 4.7318°W, SN112003		Prehistoric	PE427
	Little Hoyle Cave and Longbury Bank Dark Age Site	Cave	Penally	51.6663°N 4.7321°W, SS111999		Prehistoric	PE428
	Standing Stone 350m N of Knightston Farm	Standing stone	St Mary Out Liberty	51.696°N 4.7166°W, SN123031		Prehistoric	PE511
	Buckspool Down Camp	Promontory fort - coastal	Stackpole	51.6023°N 4.9553°W, SR954934		Prehistoric	PE320
	Fishpond Camp	Promontory fort - coastal	Stackpole	51.6157°N 4.9315°W, SR971948		Prehistoric	PE112
Greenala Camp	Greenala Camp	Promontory fort - inland	Stackpole	51.6325°N 4.8818°W, SS006965		Prehistoric	PE046
	Sampson Cross Standing Stone	Standing stone	Stackpole	51.6293°N 4.9452°W, SR962963		Prehistoric	PE345
	Stackpole Earthwork	Enclosure	Stackpole	51.6326°N 4.9104°W, SR987966		Prehistoric	PE347
	Stackpole Farm Standing Stone	Standing stone	Stackpole	51.6247°N 4.9374°W, SR967958		Prehistoric	PE346
	Stackpole Warren Hut Group	Unenclosed hut circle	Stackpole	51.6154°N 4.9208°W, SR979948		Prehistoric	PE367
	Stackpole Warren Standing Stone	Standing stone	Stackpole	51.6179°N 4.9175°W, SR981950		Prehistoric	PE365
	Molleston Camp	Enclosure	Templeton	51.7826°N 4.7741°W, SN087130		Prehistoric	PE274
	Narberth Mountain Enclosure	Enclosure	Templeton	51.7841°N 4.7366°W, SN113130		Prehistoric	PE394
	Daylight Rock Mesolithic Site	Cave	Tenby	51.6379°N 4.6753°W, SS149966		Prehistoric	PE426
	Nanna's Cave	Cave	Tenby	51.641°N 4.681°W, SS146969		Prehistoric	PE425
	Potter's Cave	Cave	Tenby	51.6417°N 4.6844°W, SS143970		Prehistoric	PE424
	Crug Ebolion	Round barrow	Trelech, (also Clydey), (see also Carmarthenshire)	51.9578°N 4.5194°W, SN269318		Prehistoric	CM093

Scheduled Monuments in Pembrokeshire, Wales.
=Prehistoric Monument sites

== See also ==
- List of Cadw properties
- List of castles in Wales
- List of hill forts in Wales
- Historic houses in Wales
- List of monastic houses in Wales
- List of museums in Wales
- List of Roman villas in Wales
