= King's Quoit =

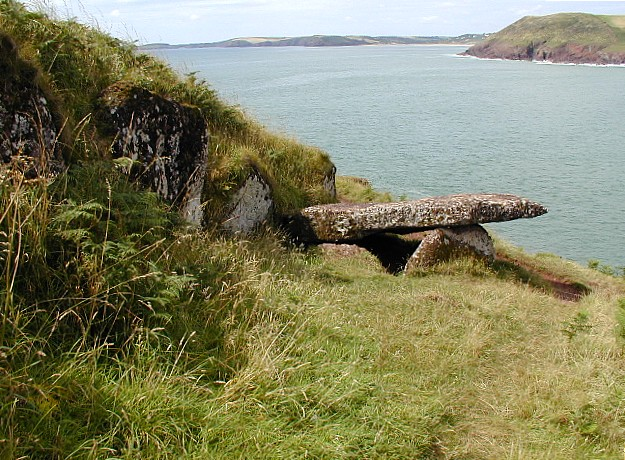

- Location within Pembrokeshire
- 51°38′26.88″N 4°48′21.72″W
- Type: Burial chamber
- Periods: Neolithic
- Location: Manorbier, Pembrokeshire, Wales
- OS grid reference: SS 059 973

King's Quoit is a Neolithic burial chamber located in Manorbier, 5 miles (8.0 km) east of Pembroke, Pembrokeshire, Wales. It is a scheduled monument.

== Description ==
The cromlech known as the King's Quoit is south of Manorbier bay and beach. The monument is on high land above the steep cliff overlooking the bay. The capstone, 4 metres (13 ft) by 2.5 metres (8 ft 2 in), and 0.5 metres (1 ft 8 in) thick, is supported partly by the rising ground, partly by two upright stones; another upright to the east has fallen away. The chamber is partly below ground.

== See also ==
- British megalith architecture
- List of Scheduled prehistoric Monuments in south Pembrokeshire
