= Llandovery Castle =

Castle in Carmarthenshire, Wales

- Llandovery, Carmarthenshire, Wales
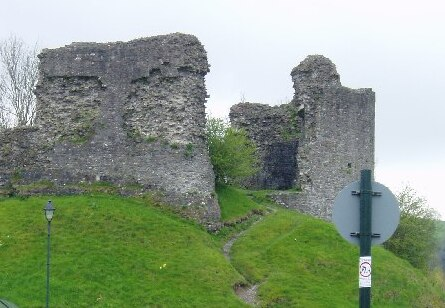

Site information
- Type: Castle
- Condition: Ruins

Location
- Shown within Wales
- Coordinates: 51.9924°N 3.7952°W

Site history
- Built by: Richard Fitz Pons?

Listed Building – Grade II*
- Designated: 3 August 1966

Llandovery Castle (Welsh: Castell Llanymddyfri) is a late thirteenth-century, Grade II*-listed, castle ruin in the town of Llandovery in Carmarthenshire, Wales. It occupies a knoll overlooking the River Towy and the land surrounding it. The Normans built a castle in the current location in the early twelfth century and this was rebuilt in stone. It was burnt in the early sixteenth century and never repaired.

== History ==
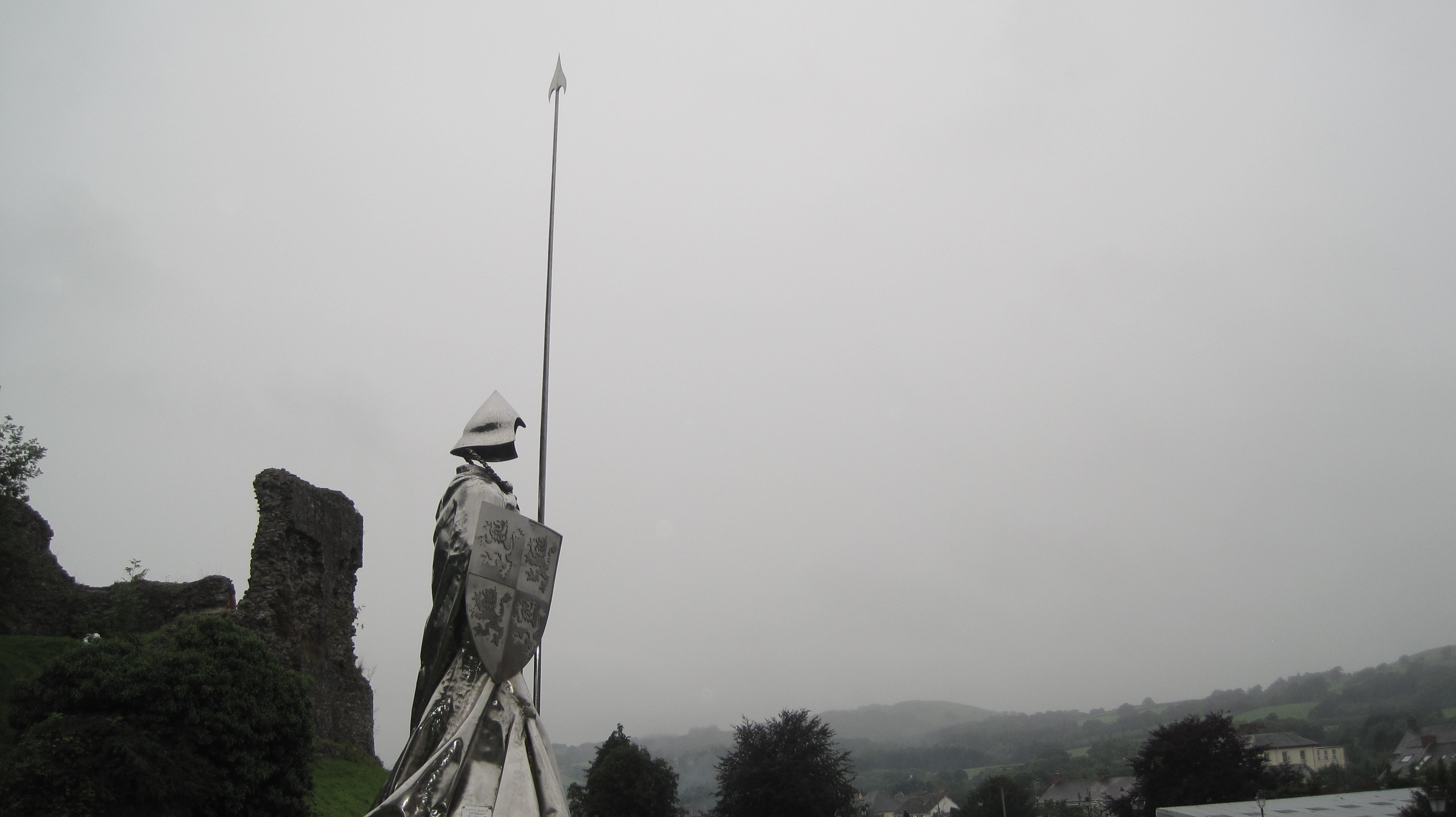
Castell Llanymddyfri Sir Gaerfyrddin gyda cherflun o – LLywelyn ap Gruffydd Fychan

A Norman knight, Richard Fitz Pons, received the lordship of Cantref Bychan in 1116 and he probably began construction of a motte-and-bailey castle in 1116. It was repeatedly lost to the Princes of Deheubarth over the next several generations. King Henry II of England spent a great deal of money repairing the castle in 1159–62, but the Welsh captured it regardless.

It finally fell to the English under Edward I in 1277. It was briefly recaptured by Welsh forces under Llywelyn ap Gruffudd five years later. The castle was then granted to John Giffard, 1st Baron Giffard, who likely rebuilt it in stone.

The building passed to the baronial Audley family of Heleigh in 1299 (who later inherited the lordship of Cemaes in north Pembrokeshire) and then into the Touchet family in the fourteenth century.

King Henry IV of England visited the castle in 1400 and it was besieged during the Owain Glyndŵr rebellion three years later.

The castle was burnt in a rebellion led by Hywel ap Rhys in 1532 and was never rebuilt.

== Description ==
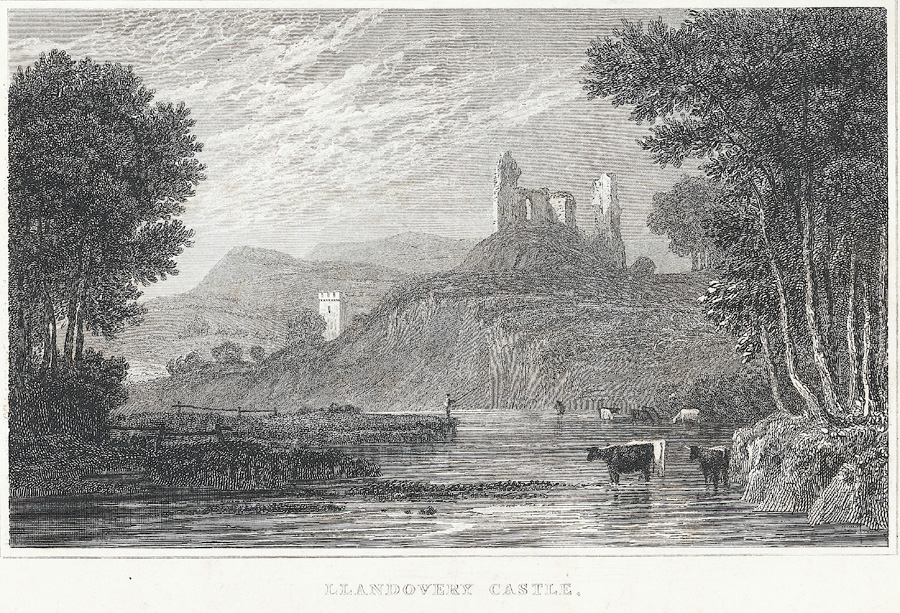
Llandovery Castle, Carmarthenshire

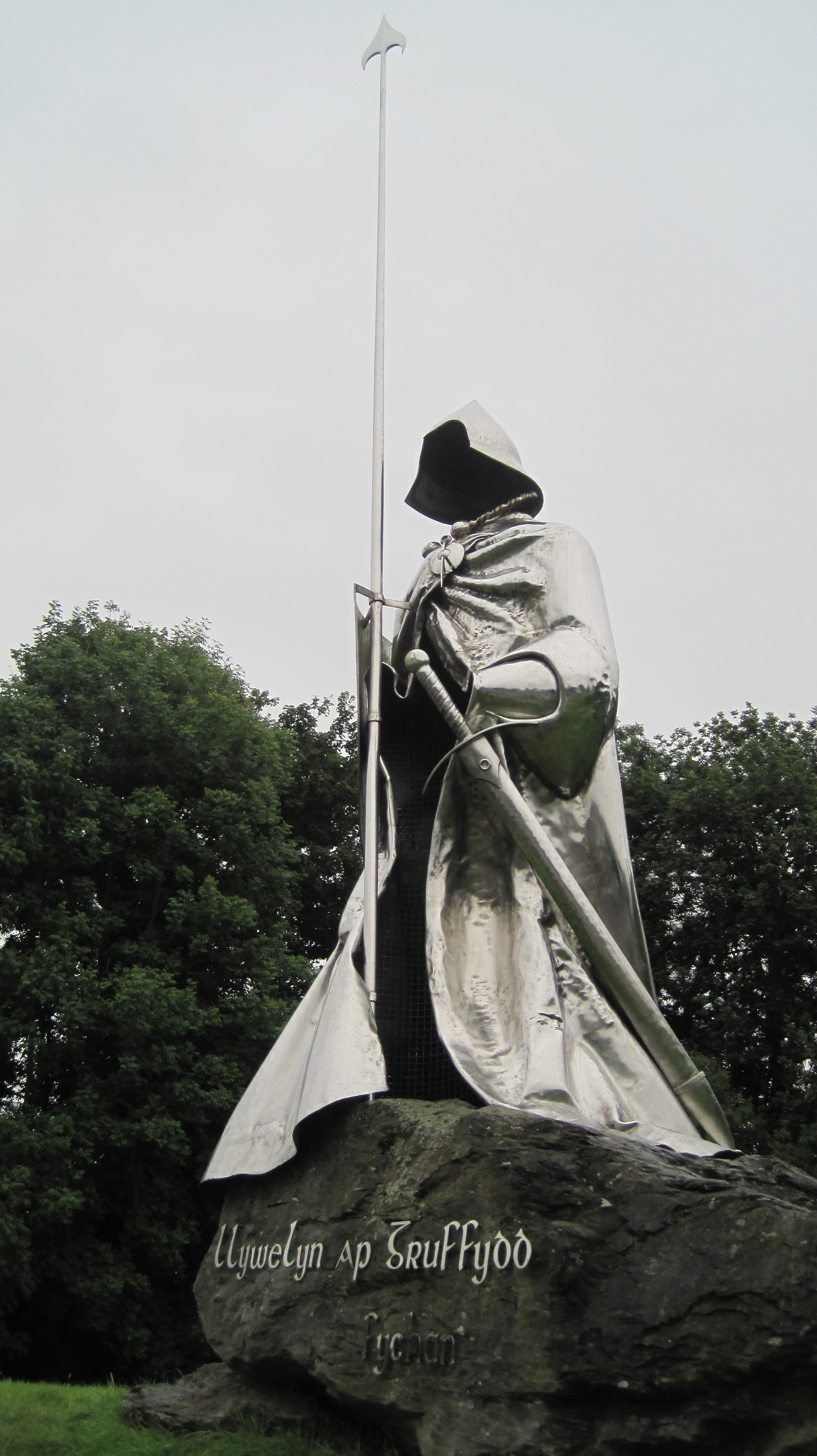
Castell Llanymddyfri Sir Gaerfyrddin gyda cherflun o – LLywelyn ap Gruffydd Fychan

The keep is a large D-shaped tower on the western side of the castle. The gatehouse has two towers on the north side with a well-tower. There are also remnants of the curtain wall around the filled-in ditch.

== See also ==
- List of castles in Wales
- Castles in Great Britain and Ireland
- Scheduled Monuments in Carmarthenshire
