= Llandybie =

Village and community in Carmarthenshire, Wales

Coordinates: 51.820°N 4.001°W

Llandybie: Welsh: Llandybïe
- Village and community
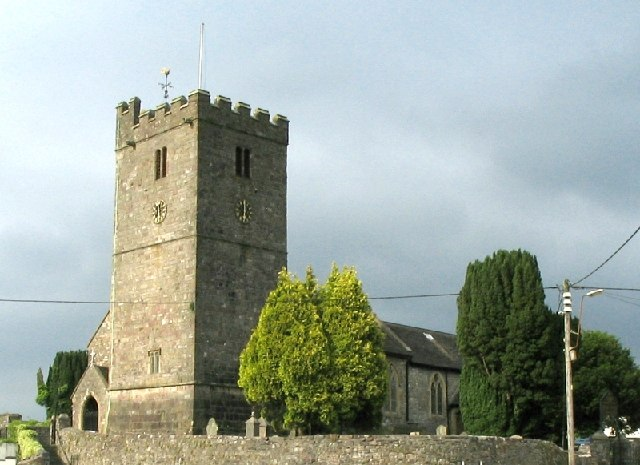
- St Tybie's church

- Location within Carmarthenshire
- OS grid reference: SN617153
- Community: Llandybie
- Principal area: Carmarthenshire
- Country: Wales
- Sovereign state: United Kingdom
- Police: Dyfed-Powys
- Fire: Mid and West Wales
- Ambulance: Welsh
- List of places UK Wales Carmarthenshire Map of the community

Llandybie (Welsh: Llandybïe [ˌɬandəˈbiːɛ], "Saint Tybie's church") is a village and community in Carmarthenshire, Wales, with the village being situated 2 miles (3.2 km) north of Ammanford.

According to the United Kingdom Census 2001, Llandybie village itself is home to a population of 3,800, while the community – which also includes the villages of Blaenau, Caerbryn, Capel Hendre, Cwmgwili, Pentregwenlais, Penybanc, Pen-y-groes, and Saron – has 8,800 inhabitants, increasing to 10,994 at the 2011 census.

It was in Llandybie, in 1943, that the mineral Brammallite was found for the first time. Llandybie hosted the National Eisteddfod of Wales in 1944.

The village is served by Llandybie railway station on the Heart of Wales Line and the A483 road which is the main road. Llandybie Community Primary School is located in the north-easterly fringe of the village.

The community is bordered by the communities of: Dyffryn Cennen; Cwmamman; Betws; Ammanford; Llanedi; Llannon; Gorslas; and Llanfihangel Aberbythych, all being in Carmarthenshire.

== Notable people ==
- Lady Caroline Catharine Wilkinson (1822–1881), a Welsh botanist and author
- John Thomas Job (1867–1938), a Welsh minister, hymn-writer and poet.
- Anne Ceridwen Rees (1874 in Pentregwenlais – 1905), a Welsh physician who practiced in New Jersey
- Elmer Rees (1941–2019), a Welsh mathematician and director of the Heilbronn Institute for Mathematical Research
- Jenny Ogwen (born ca.1943), former actress and TV presenter

== Sources ==
- Rees, Dylan (2019). Llandybie. A History. Llandybie Community Council. ISBN 978-1-904323-38-9.
