= Yr Hen Gapel, Llanybri =

Yr Hen Gapel
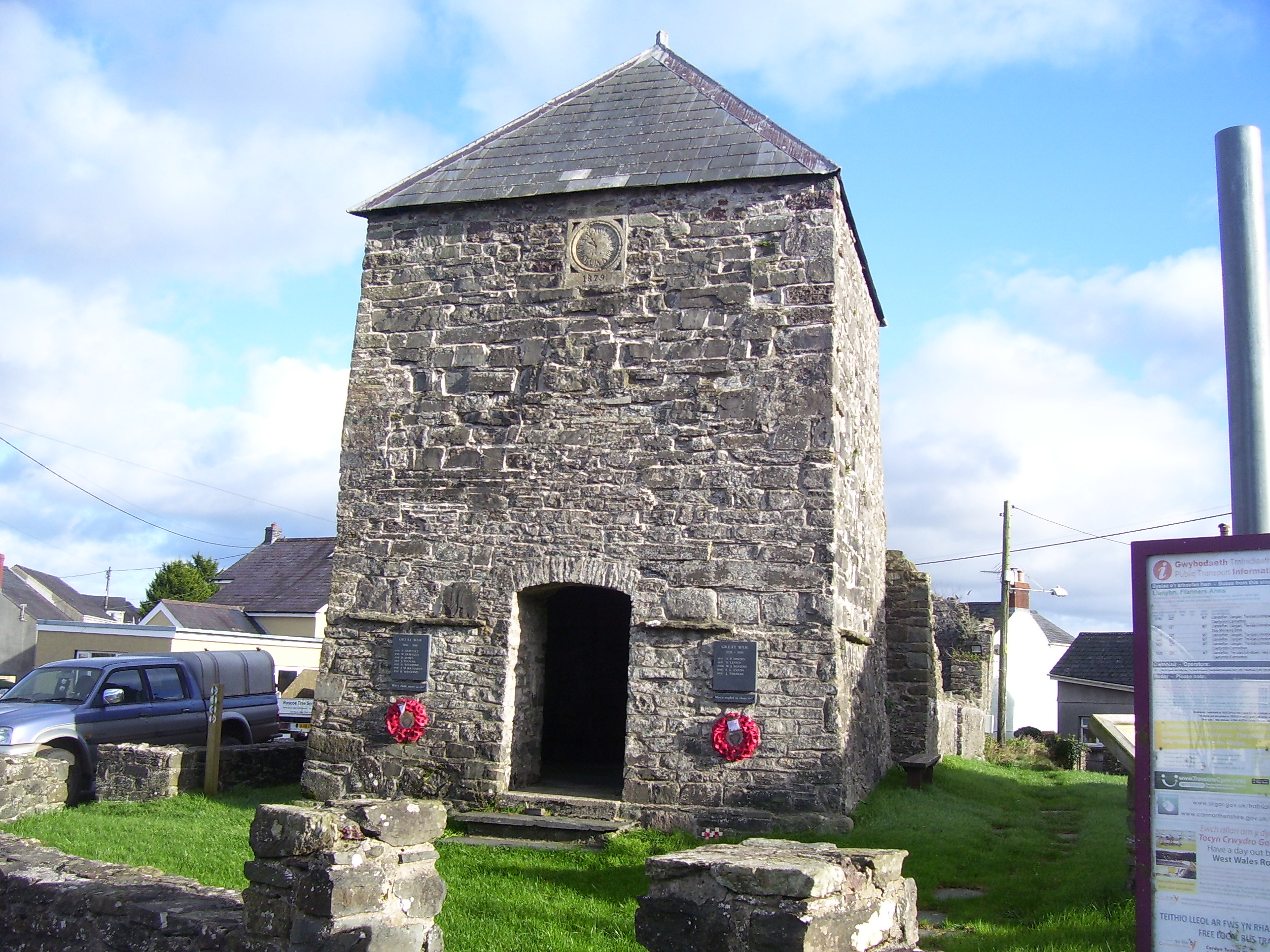
- Restored tower of Yr Hen Gapel
- Interactive map of the Yr Hen Gapel area

General information
- Coordinates: 51.78691°N 4.41244°W
- Completed: circa 1300s

Yr Hen Gapel (Welsh for The Old Chapel) is a now ruined religious building and scheduled ancient monument in the village of Llanybri, Carmarthenshire, Wales. The tower and ruins have been given Grade II heritage listing.

It is unusual in having been subsequently converted for use by a non-conformist congregation.

== Description ==
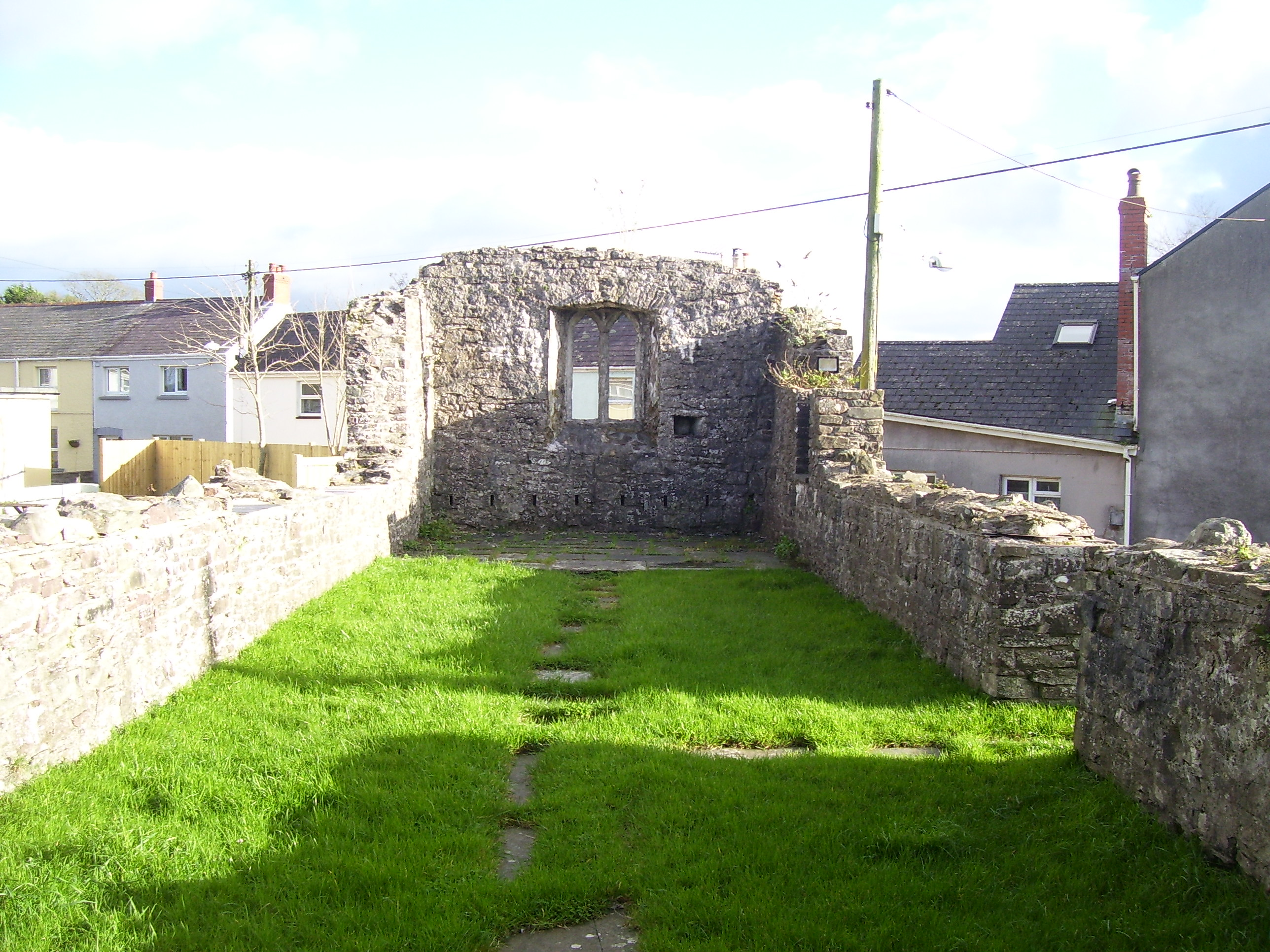
Ruined nave of the chapel

The remaining chapel consists of a square tower at the western end and a ruined nave to the east, all built from rubble stone. The long walls of the nave are low and have a gap in the south wall for a door. The eastern end wall is approximately 3 metres in height and still retains a traceried window opening with trefoiled heads.

The squat tower has a pyramid-shaped roof. On the west face is a false stone clockface dated 1879, with the 'hands' set at five minutes to ten.

The ruins are a scheduled ancient monument. An information panel gives information about the history of the site. The tower also doubles as the village war memorial, with two plaques beside the door.

== History ==
The church was referred to in 1388 as "Morbrichurche". Dedicated to St Mary the Virgin, it was a chapel-of-ease to nearby Llansteffan.

Recorded as still being an Anglican place of worship in 1671, the church was repaired and taken over in the 17th century as a non-conformist place of worship, described as "a remarkable change for the date". The congregation was founded by Stephen Hughes circa 1670. The chapel is believed to be a unique example of being converted for non-conformist use.

The congregation purchased the chapel in 1878, making changes including removal of the upper storey of the tower and the addition of a pyramid roof (the tower was originally battlemented and was recorded in the 1500s as having bells).

The chapel finally closed in 1962 and became Grade II listed in 1966. Following a fire in 1974, most of the building was demolished.
