= Hundleton =

Village and community in Pembrokeshire, Wales

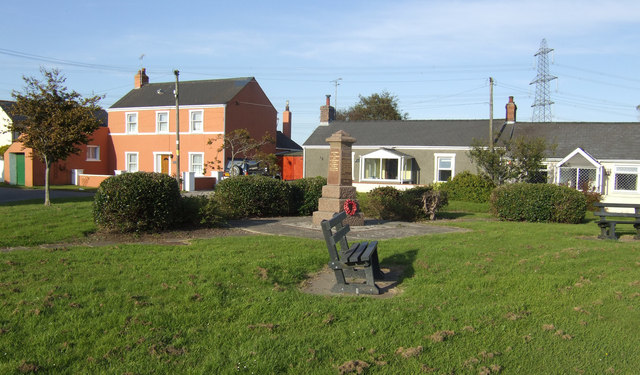
- Hundleton village green

- Location within Pembrokeshire
- Population: 908 (2011)
- OS grid reference: SM960007
- Community: Hundleton
- Principal area: Pembrokeshire
- Country: Wales
- Sovereign state: United Kingdom
- Post town: Pembroke
- Postcode district: SA71
- Police: Dyfed-Powys
- Fire: Mid and West Wales
- Ambulance: Welsh
- UK Parliament: Mid and South Pembrokeshire
- Senedd Cymru – Welsh Parliament: Ceredigion Penfro
- List of places UK Wales Pembrokeshire 51.67°N 4.95°W Map of the community

Hundleton is a village and a community in Pembrokeshire, Wales, in the parish of Monkton. The community covers the adjacent settlements of West Orielton, Brownslate, Corston and Pwllcrochan.

== Amenities ==
Hundleton village contains a chapel, a restaurant, a public house and several bed and breakfast houses.

Amenities include a park, playing area and football and cricket area and a mother and toddler group.

== Governance ==
An electoral ward in the same name also exists. This ward covers the whole peninsula with a total population taken at the 2011 census of 1,877.

== Orielton ==
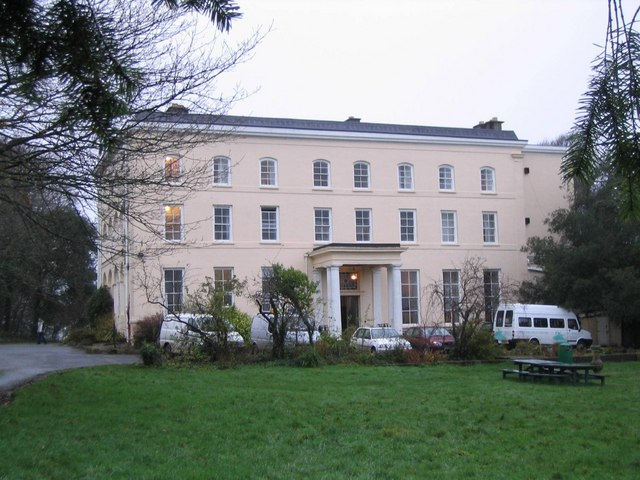
Orielton

Orielton is a historic country house dating from the 18th century. From 1963 until 2022 it was used as a field studies centre by the Field Studies Council. The house and the nearby Orielton Banqueting Tower are grade II* listed buildings.
