= Llanfihangel Aberbythych =

Community in Carmarthenshire, Wales

Coordinates: 51.835°N 4.064°W

- Community
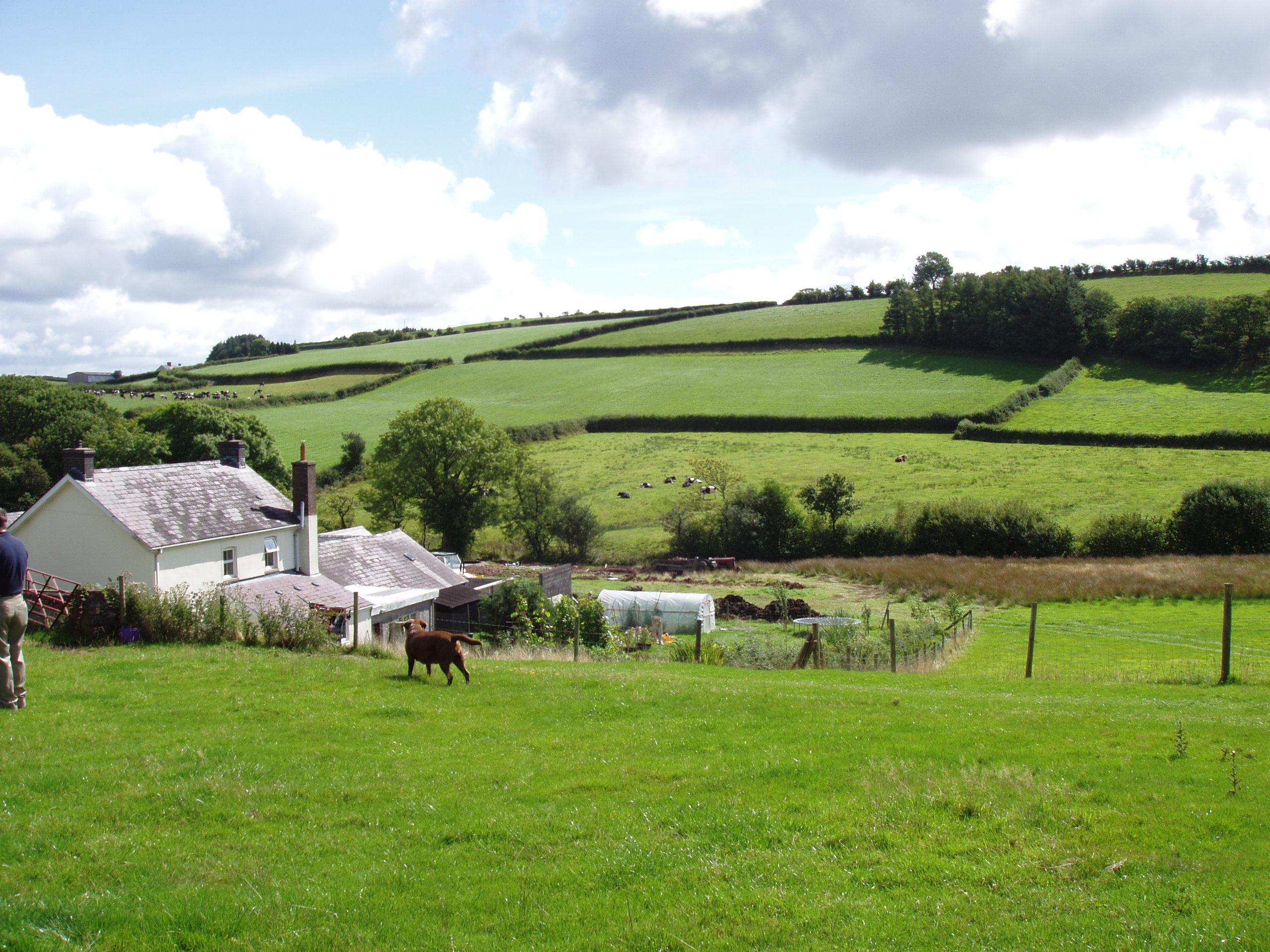
- Llanfihangel Aberbythych countryside

- Location within Carmarthenshire
- Principal area: Carmarthenshire
- Country: Wales
- Sovereign state: United Kingdom
- Police: Dyfed-Powys
- Fire: Mid and West Wales
- Ambulance: Welsh
- List of places UK Wales Carmarthenshire Map of the community

Llanfihangel Aberbythych (Welsh pronunciation) is a community in Carmarthenshire, Wales. The population recorded at the 2011 census was 1,344. It is bordered by Llangathen, Llandeilo, Dyffryn Cennen, Llandybie, Gorslas and Llanarthney, all of which are in Carmarthenshire. There is no village of Llanfihangel Aberbythych – the name is taken from St Michael's Church, which dates from 1849, at Golden Grove (Welsh: Gelli Aur), about 3 miles (5 km) south-west of Llandeilo. It now belongs to the Church in Wales parish of Catheiniog. Villages include Carmel and Maesybont.

== Governance ==
An electoral ward of Carmarthenshire County Council with the same name exists. This stretches north from the village and holds a total population of 1,851.

== Notable person ==
- Sir William Vaughan (c. 1575 – August 1641) was a writer in English and Latin, who promoted Welsh colonisation in Newfoundland. He was born at Golden Grove.
