= Kidwelly Industrial Museum =

- Amgueddfa Ddiwydiannol Cydweli
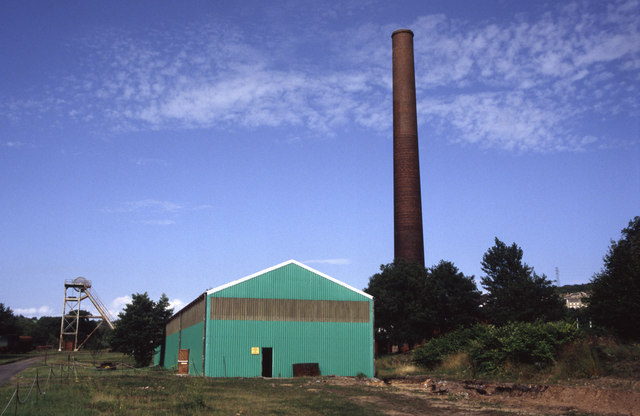
- Former tinplate works with preserved steam engine and a colliery headgear and winding engine

- Location within Carmarthenshire
- Location: Kidwelly, Carmarthenshire, Wales
- Coordinates: 51.7467°N 4.2887°W
- Type: Industry museum
- Website: Kidwelly Industrial Museum

The Kidwelly Industrial Museum was a museum focused on the tinplate industry in Kidwelly, as well as area coal mining and brick making.

== Location ==
The museum is located near the town of Kidwelly, Carmarthenshire, West Wales, on the site of the former Kidwelly Tinplate Works. The tinplate works was originally established in 1737 and was closed in 1941. The museum closed in 2017.

The engine house of the tinplate works was listed as Grade II* in 1998 while the works chimney, boxing room and assorting room are listed as Grade II.
