= Scheduled monuments in Ceredigion =

Heritage sites in Wales

Ceredigion, Wales

Ceredigion is a large rural county in West Wales. It has a long coastline of Cardigan Bay to the west and the remote moorland of the Cambrian Mountains in the east, with the mountainous terrain of Plynlimon in the northeast. Ceredigion has a total of 264 scheduled monuments. That is too many to have on a single list page, so for convenience the list is divided into two, 163 prehistoric sites and 101 Roman, Medieval and Post Medieval sites.

Ceredigion is both a unitary authority and a historic county. Historically the county was called Cardiganshire. Between 1974 and 1996 it was merged with Carmarthenshire and Pembrokeshire to form Dyfed.

== Prehistoric sites ==
The prehistoric monuments (pre-Roman) include 13 Neolithic and Bronze Age scheduled standing stones and three stone circles. There are a large and diverse variety of burial cairns, mounds and barrows, mainly from the Bronze Age and mainly on the eastern uplands, accounting for some 79 sites. A further 70 defensive Iron Age sites such as hillforts and enclosures are distributed across the county.

== Roman to modern sites ==
Of the 101 scheduled sites dating to Roman or later, there are four Roman military sites, seven early Medieval sites, all of which are inscribed or carved stones. The 39 high Medieval sites are overwhelmingly defensive settlements: everything from castles, mottes and ringworks to enclosures and deserted house sites. The notable exception is the abbey ruins at Strata Florida. From the post-medieval period, there are 17 deserted settlements, five bridges, nine lead mines, six field defenses from World War II, and an assortment of other sites – a total of 51 post-medieval monuments.

== Scheduled monuments ==
Scheduled monuments have statutory protection. It is illegal to disturb the ground surface or any standing remains. The compilation of the list is undertaken by Cadw Welsh Historic Monuments, which is an executive agency of the National Assembly of Wales. The list of scheduled monuments below is supplied by Cadw with additional material from Royal Commission on the Ancient and Historical Monuments of Wales and Dyfed Archaeological Trust.
