= Scheduled monuments in Carmarthenshire =

Carmarthenshire, Wales

Carmarthenshire is a large rural county in West Wales. It includes a mix of upland and mountainous terrain and fertile farmland. The western end of the Brecon Beacons National Park lies within the county. Across Carmarthenshire there are a total of 370 scheduled monuments. That is too many to have on a single list page, so for convenience, the list is divided into the 227 prehistoric sites and the 143 Roman, Medieval and Post Medieval sites.

Carmarthenshire is both a unitary authority and a historic county. Between 1974 and 1996 it was merged with Cardiganshire (now Ceredigion) and Pembrokeshire to form Dyfed.

== Prehistoric sites ==
All the pre-Roman sites are on the List of prehistoric scheduled monuments in Carmarthenshire. Of the 227 prehistoric sites there are small a number of stone chambered tombs from the Neolithic. There are a large and diverse variety of burial cairns, mounds and barrows, mainly from the Bronze Age, accounting for 197 sites. A further 49 Iron Age sites are mostly defensive sites such as hillforts and enclosures.

== Roman to modern sites ==
These are on the List of Roman-to-modern scheduled monuments in Carmarthenshire. 29 sites are from Roman period (most, but by no means all military, and predominantly in the north of the county), and there are 10 early medieval sites, all of which are stone crosses or inscribed stones. There are 57 sites dating to post-Norman medieval times, including a remarkable collection of 8 castles and a further 25 castle mounds. The 47 varied post-medieval sites include clusters along the coastal area, dating from the 16th to the 20th centuries.

== Scheduled monuments ==
Scheduled monuments have statutory protection. It is illegal to disturb the ground surface or any standing remains. The compilation of the list is undertaken by Cadw Welsh Historic Monuments, which is an executive agency of the National Assembly of Wales. The list of scheduled monuments is supplied by Cadw. Material on these sites is also collected and published by RCAHMW and Dyfed Archaeological Trust.
