= Dyffryn Cennen =

Community in Carmarthenshire, Wales

Coordinates: 51.85996°N 3.98495°W

- Community
- Location within Carmarthenshire
- Principal area: Carmarthenshire
- Country: Wales
- Sovereign state: United Kingdom
- Police: Dyfed-Powys
- Fire: Mid and West Wales
- Ambulance: Welsh
- List of places UK Wales Carmarthenshire Map of the community

Dyffryn Cennen is a community located in Carmarthenshire, Wales. The population of the community taken at the 2011 census was 1,176.

The community is bordered by the communities of: Manordeilo and Salem; Llangadog; Cwmamman; Llandybie; Llanfihangel Aberbythych; and Llandeilo, all being in Carmarthenshire.

It includes the villages of Ffairfach and Trapp.

The community is part of the Llandeilo electoral ward for elections to Carmarthenshire County Council.
