= Llanedi =

Village and community in Carmarthenshire, Wales

Coordinates: 51°44′54″N 4°03′04.00″W

- Village and community
- Location within Carmarthenshire
- Principal area: Carmarthenshire
- Country: Wales
- Sovereign state: United Kingdom
- Police: Dyfed-Powys
- Fire: Mid and West Wales
- Ambulance: Welsh
- List of places UK Wales Carmarthenshire Map of the community

Llanedi (Welsh pronunciation) is a village and community in Carmarthenshire, Wales. Once the name of a parish, Llanedi is now a community taking in the hamlet of Llanedi and the villages of Hendy, Fforest (suburbs of Pontarddulais) and Tycroes. The community population taken at the 2011 census was 5,664. The community is located between Ammanford and Llanelli.

The community is bordered by the communities of: Llangennech; Llannon; Llandybie; Ammanford; and Betws, all being in Carmarthenshire, and by: Mawr; Pontarddulais; and Grovesend and Waungron, all in the City and County of Swansea.

The name of the parish church, St Edith's, is thought to have the same origin as the name of the village. There are no apparent traces of the original medieval church and substantial rebuilding took place in 1860, Richard Kyrke Penson being the architect.

== Famous residents ==
- David Cuthbert Thomas (1895–1916), who inspired the First World War poets Siegfried Sassoon and Robert Graves, was the son of the rector of Llanedi. His name appears on the war memorial in the village.
