= Llangynog, Carmarthenshire =

Village and community in Carmarthenshire, Wales

Coordinates: 51°49′12″N 4°24′39″W

Llangynog
- Village and community
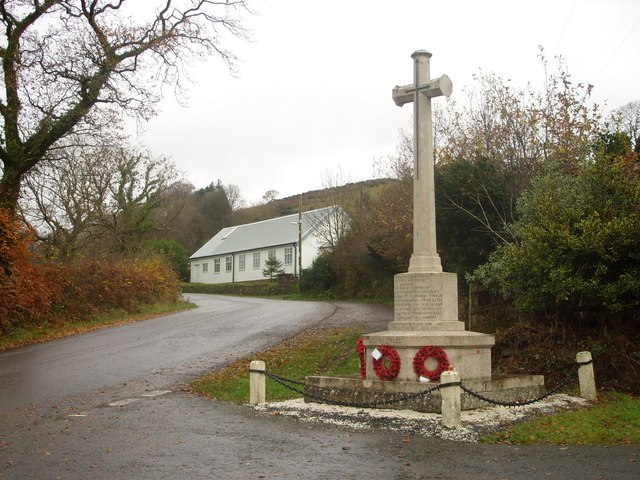
- Llangynog, Carmarthenshire

- Location within Carmarthenshire
- Principal area: Carmarthenshire
- Country: Wales
- Sovereign state: United Kingdom
- Police: Dyfed-Powys
- Fire: Mid and West Wales
- Ambulance: Welsh
- List of places UK Wales Carmarthenshire Map of the community

Llangynog is a village and community located in Carmarthenshire, Wales, the main settlement of which was once called ‘Ebenezer’village. It is bordered by the communities of: Newchurch and Merthyr; Carmarthen; Llangain; Llansteffan; Laugharne Township; and St Clears, all being in Carmarthenshire. The population at the 2011 census was 492.

Rocks found in a quarry near to the village in 1977 contain some of the Earth's oldest fossils which date from the Ediacaran period, 564 million years ago, when modern-day Wales was part of the micro-continent Avalonia. There are a number of Iron Age hillforts in the area but centuries of ploughing have reduced most to cropmarks only visible from the air. Several neolithic burial monuments have also been identified, notably the cromlech of Twlc-y-Fihast (‘the lair of the grey bitch’) and the nearby stone slab, Bwrrd Arthur (‘Arthur’s Table’) both associated with the legends of the Mabinogion. Medieval Llangynog lay within the boundaries of the Norman lordship of Llansteffan. The parish is named after the church, at that time a chapelry of St Ystyffan parish in the medieval Deanery of Carmarthen. It stands in an isolated location and gained grade II* listed status in 2001. Evidence of pre-conquest religious use of the site is shown through its dedication to the prominent Celtic saint Cynog and circular churchyard. The "Coomb Chapel" has a distinctive mosaic mural and was added by the Kylsant family in the 19th century. At the southern end of the parish lay an important pilgrimage route to St David's fording the Cywyn at ‘Pilgrims Rest’, a medieval hall still survives close to the ruined church of Llanfihangel Abercowin. A school for 124 children was built in 1705 and later endowed by Judge Vaughan of Derllys in 1711 for the provision of clothing and books. Ebenezer Chapel was built in 1811, its members were baptized by total immersion in the nearby ‘Afon Cynog’ steam. The 1841 tithe survey showed nearly seventy farms and three water mills grinding corn in Llangynog parish. In 1860 the Morris banking family of Carmarthen built Coombe mansion on the site of an 18th-century manor house. In 1884, the community was described as follows:

Llangynog is a parish, in the higher division of the hundred of Derllys, union and county of Carmarthen, South Wales. Llangynog is 6 miles (9.7 km) south-west from Carmarthen; containing 800 inhabitants. The community comprises about 5,429 acres (21.97 km^{2}) of good land, chiefly arable, and has been greatly improved since the year 1806. The greater part of it being now in a good state of cultivation. The surrounding scenery, with few exceptions, is tame and uninteresting, though some of the distant views are picturesque and beautiful. The soil is poor, rocky, and barren, and the chief produce is oats and barley, with a little wheat... The parish church, dedicated to St Cynog is a very plain edifice, consisting of two aisles.

The War Memorial near the village hall commemorates both world wars, and was unveiled by Princess Marie Louise (granddaughter of Queen Victoria) in 1922. Lady Kylsant sold Coombe Mansion to the Home Office in 1941 and it became a National Children's Home, initially for war evacuees. In 1960 the property was purchased by the Leonard Cheshire Foundation as a facility for ex-service veterans, remaining as residential home until 2006.

The triangle formed by Llangynog, Llangain and Llansteffan was described by Dylan Thomas as his ' "breeding-box valley". His mother's family, the Williamses, lived in the triangle, in farms such as Waunfwlchan, Llwyngwyn, Maesgwyn and Penycoed.

== Notable people ==
- Owen Phillips (1863–1937) 1st Baron Kylsant, shipping magnate and politician resident at Coombe House.
- Gerald Williams (1929 -2016) tennis commentator who spent 10 years in the village after moving from Surrey with his mother to escape the Blitz in 1939.
- Eurig Salisbury (born 1983), poet and writer, grew up in the village
