= Pembrey and Burry Port Town =

Community in Carmarthenshire, Wales

Coordinates: 51.682°N 4.262°W

- Community
- Location within Carmarthenshire
- Principal area: Carmarthenshire
- Country: Wales
- Sovereign state: United Kingdom
- Police: Dyfed-Powys
- Fire: Mid and West Wales
- Ambulance: Welsh
- List of places UK Wales Carmarthenshire Map of the community

Pembrey and Burry Port Town (Welsh: Pen-bre a Phorth Tywyn) is a community located in Carmarthenshire, Wales including the town of Burry Port and the village of Pembrey. The community population taken at the 2011 census was 8,547.

The community lies on the north-eastern shore of Carmarthen Bay. It is bordered by the communities of: Llansteffan; St Ishmael; Kidwelly; Trimsaran; and Llanelli Rural, all being in Carmarthenshire. The community was renamed from Cefn Sidan in 1999; Cefn Sidan is a beach in the area.

== See also ==
- Pembrey Circuit
- Pembrey Airport
- Court Farm, Pembrey
