= Scheduled monuments in Powys =

Welsh historic places

Location of Powys, Wales

Powys is the largest administrative county in Wales. With over a quarter of Wales's land area, covering much of the eastern half of the country, it is a county of remote uplands, low population and no coastline. It was created in more or less its current form in 1974, and is the only one of the large county units created at that time to have been carried forward intact at the 1996 local government re-organisation. It comprises three historic counties, namely Montgomeryshire, Radnorshire, and most of Brecknockshire. There are 950 scheduled monuments within the county. This is far more than can be sensibly covered in one list, so each of the 3 historic counties is therefore listed separately, and each of these has two lists - one for the prehistoric sites and one for the Roman, medieval and post-medieval sites.

== Statistics ==
The statistics below show the total number of sites ascribed to each period, and the breakdown for the six lists of scheduled monuments in Powys. The allocation to one or another period is not always certain, particularly between the prehistoric periods, and many sites will have remains from more than one period, so the statistics below give a general guide only.

	Prehistoric			Roman to Modern				
Lists	Neolithic	Bronze Age	Iron Age	Roman	Early Medieval	Medieval	Post- Medieval	Total
Prehistoric Montgomeryshire	2	116	21					139
Roman to modern Montgomeryshire				14	14	82	9	119
Prehistoric Radnorshire	1	117	72					190
Roman to modern Radnorshire				16	25	62	9	112
Prehistoric Brecknockshire	12	190	52					254
Roman to modern Brecknockshire				10	9	78	39	136
Totals	15	423	145	40	48	222	57	950

== Statutory protection ==
Scheduled monuments have statutory protection. It is illegal to disturb the ground surface or any standing remains. The compilation of the list is undertaken by Cadw Welsh Historic Monuments, which is an executive agency of the National Assembly of Wales. The lists above derive from the schedules supplied by Cadw and include additional material from RCAHMW and Clwyd-Powys Archaeological Trust.

The sites that are scheduled represent the most important or interesting examples of the various classes of archaeological sites. For example, a 2012 study identified 1,130 prehistoric burial mounds within Powys, of varying styles and ages, dating from 4000BC to 1000BC, most of them belonging to the Bronze Age. Of these, 339 are scheduled monuments, included on the lists above. Standing stones and other ritual stones, most again dating to the Bronze Age, also occur in large numbers, 276 being found across the county, of which 92 are scheduled.
