= List of Great Western Railway heritage sites =

Great Western Railway
- Logo of the Great Western Railway, incorporating the shields, crests and mottoes of the cities of London (left) and Bristol (right)

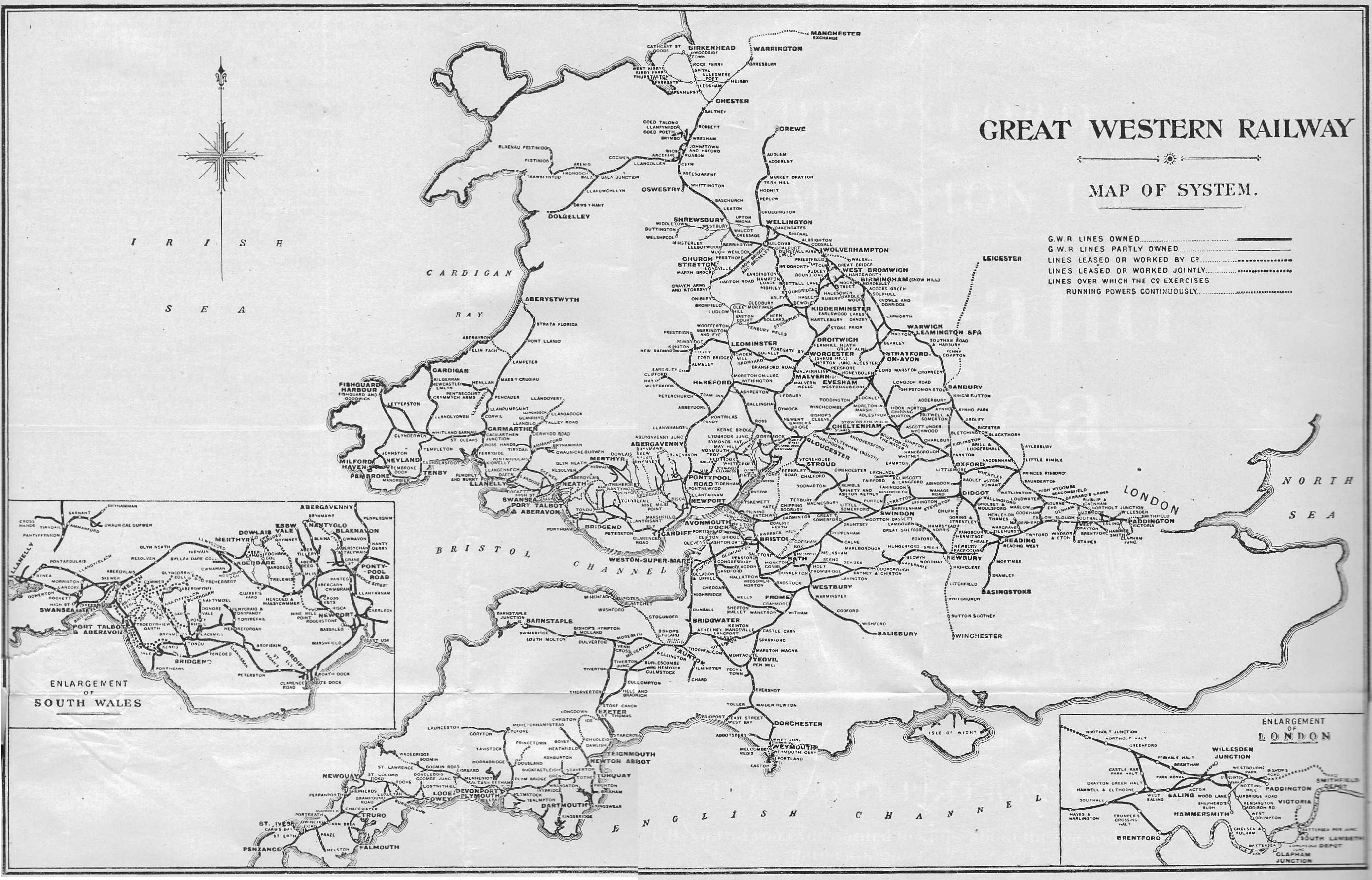
- Map of the railway pre-grouping (1920)

- Map of the railway post-grouping (1926)

History
- 1835: Act of incorporation
- 1838: First train ran
- 1869–92: 7 ft 1/4 in (2,140 mm) Brunel gauge changed to 4 ft 8 1/2 in (1,435 mm) standard gauge
- 1903: Start of road motor services
- 1923: Keeps identity though the Grouping
- 1935: Centenary
- 1948: Nationalised

Successor organisation
- 1948: British Rail, Western Region
Constituent companies
See full list of constituents of the GWR
1854	Shrewsbury and Birmingham Railway; Shrewsbury and Chester Railway
1862	South Wales Railway
1863	West Midland Railway
1876	Bristol and Exeter Railway; South Devon Railway
1889	Cornwall Railway
1922	Rhymney Railway; Taff Vale Railway; Cambrian Railways
1923	Midland & S W Junction Railway

Key locations
- Headquarters: Paddington station, London
- Locale: England; Wales
- Workshops: Swindon; Wolverhampton
- Major stations: Birmingham Snow Hill; Bristol Temple Meads; Cardiff General; London Paddington; Reading General
Route mileage
Mileage shown as at end of year stated
1841	171 miles (275 km)
1863	1,106 miles (1,780 km)
1876	2,023 miles (3,256 km)
1899	2,504 miles (4,030 km)
1919	2,996 miles 68 chains (4,823.0 km)
1921	3,005 miles (4,836 km)
1924	3,797 miles (6,111 km)
1925	3,819 miles 69 chains (6,147.5 km)

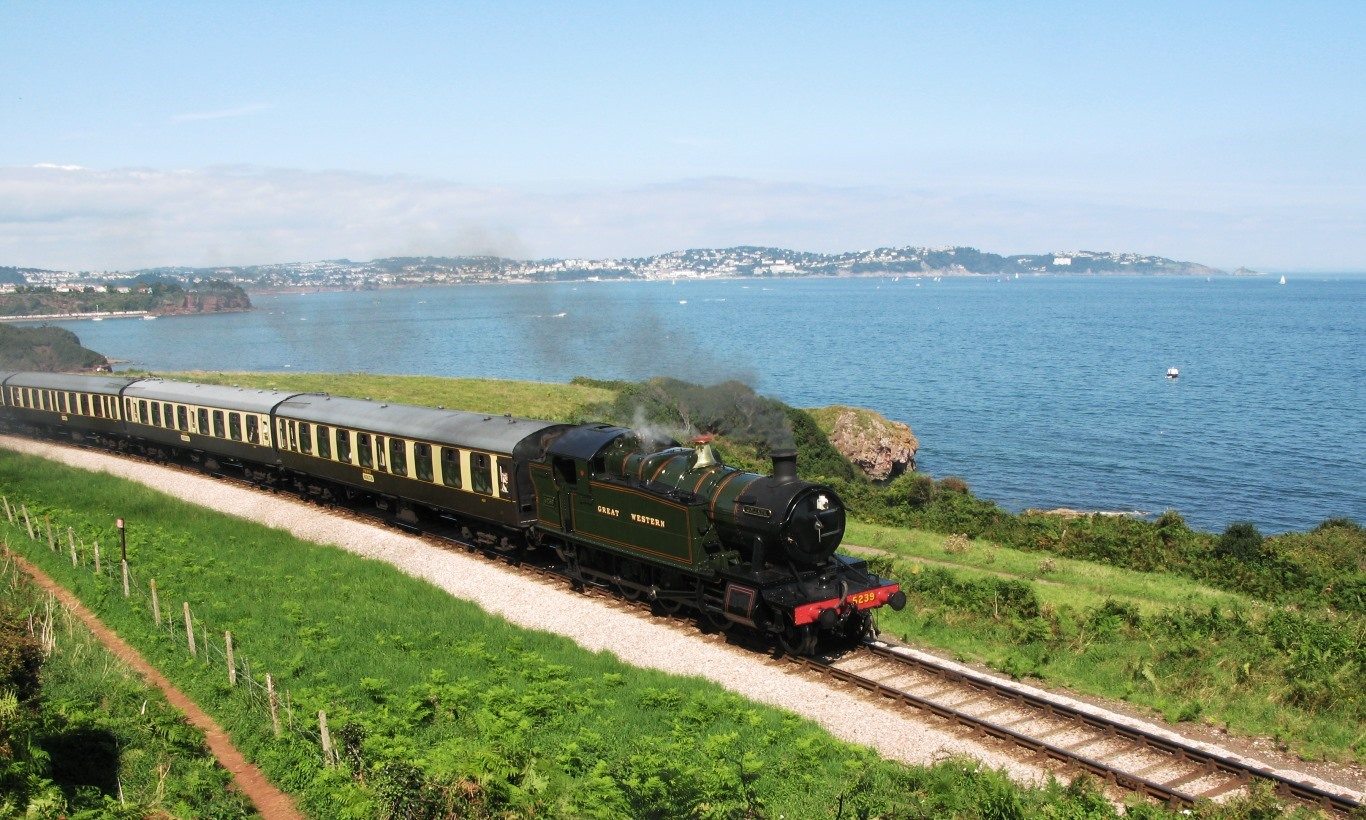
Paignton and Dartmouth Steam Railway near Goodrington

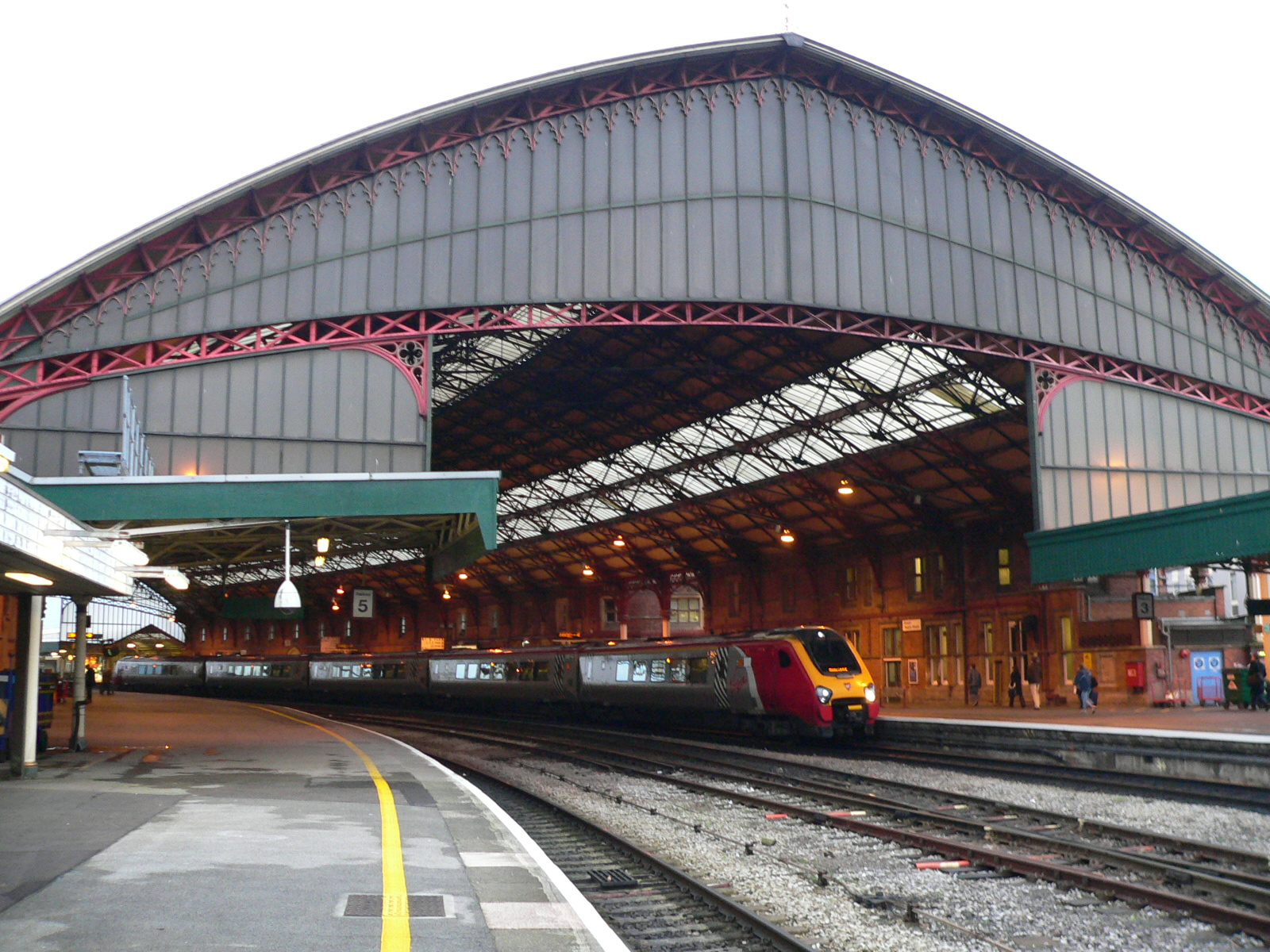
Bristol Temple Meads station

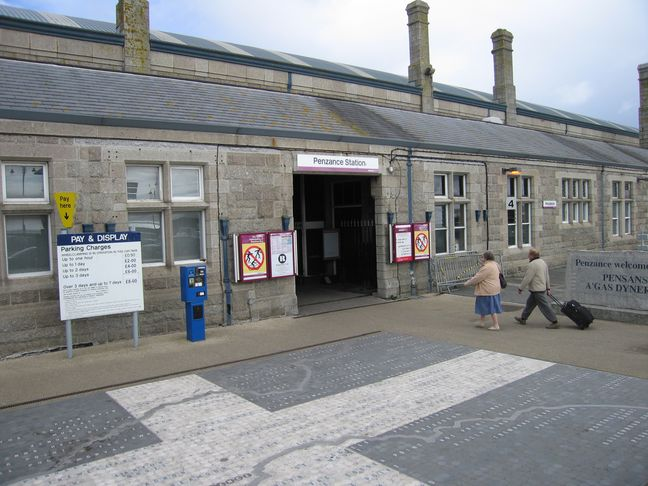
Penzance station

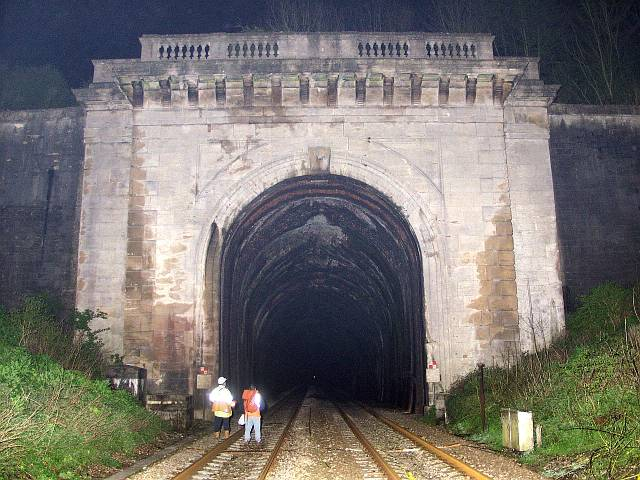
Box Tunnel

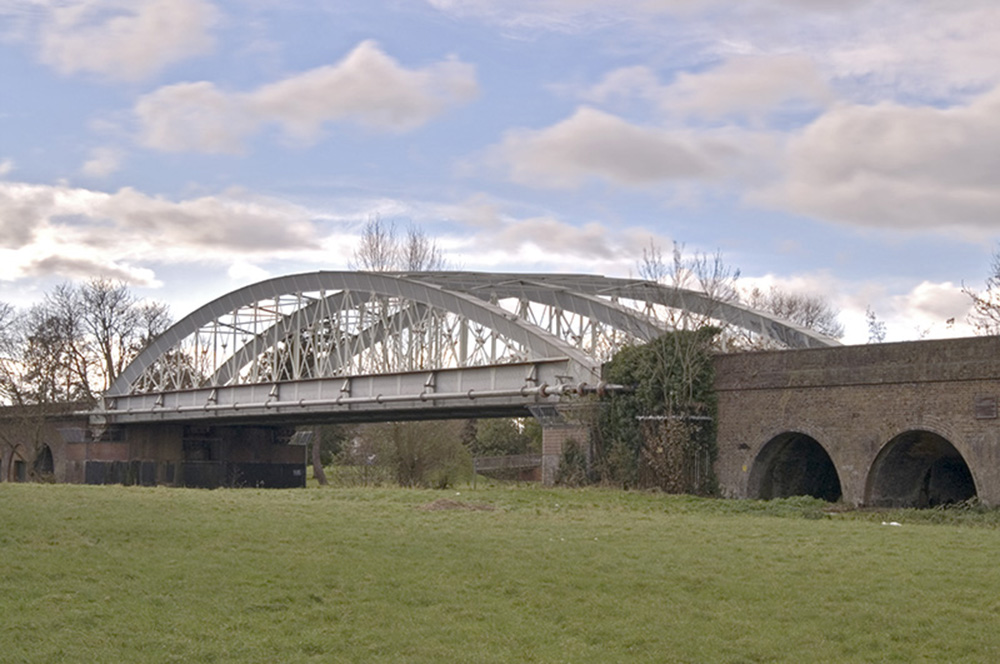
Windsor Bridge

Great Western Railway heritage sites are those places where stations, bridges and other infrastructure built by the Great Western Railway and its constituent railways can still be found. These may be heritage railways, museums, operational railway stations, or isolated listed structures.

== Operational GWR style heritage railways ==
These heritage railways operate on old GWR branch lines. Many other heritage railways and museums also have GWR locomotives or rolling stock in use or on display.

- Bodmin & Wenford Railway – Bodmin General to Boscarne Junction and Bodmin Parkway (formerly Bodmin Road), Cornwall
- Chinnor & Princes Risborough Railway – Chinnor, Oxfordshire to Princes Risborough, Buckinghamshire
- Cholsey & Wallingford Railway – Cholsey to Wallingford, Oxfordshire
- Dean Forest Railway – Lydney to Parkend, Gloucestershire
- Didcot Railway Centre, Oxfordshire
- East Somerset Railway, Cranmore, Somerset
- Gloucestershire Warwickshire Railway – Broadway, Worcestershire to Cheltenham Racecourse, Gloucestershire
- Gwili Railway – Bronwydd Arms to Llwyfan Cerrig, Carmarthenshire
- Llangollen Railway – Llangollen to Carrog
- Dartmouth Steam Railway – Paignton to Kingswear, Devon
- Plym Valley Railway – Marsh Mills, Devon
- Severn Valley Railway – Kidderminster to Bridgnorth, Worcestershire and Shropshire
- South Devon Railway – Totnes to Buckfastleigh, Devon
- Swindon and Cricklade Railway – Blunsdon, Gloucestershire
- West Somerset Railway – Bishops Lydeard to Minehead, Somerset

== Museums ==
These museums have a GWR theme or are located in old GWR buildings.

- Buckfastleigh Railway Museum, Devon
- Coleford Great Western Railway Museum, Gloucestershire
- Didcot Railway Centre, Oxfordshire
- Kidderminster railway museum, Worcestershire
- Newton Abbot Town and GWR Museum, Devon
- STEAM – the museum of the GWR, Swindon, Wiltshire (in the old Swindon railway works)

== Listed structures ==
In addition to the places listed below, there are a great many smaller bridges and other structures that have been given listed status. The listing may only cover certain buildings and structures at each location.

=== World Heritage Site ===
UNESCO is considering a proposal to list the Great Western Main Line as a World Heritage Site. The proposal comprises seven individual sites. These are Bristol Temple Meads railway station (including Brunel's Company Offices, Boardroom, train shed, and the Bristol and Exeter Railway Offices along with the route over the River Avon); Bath Spa railway station along with the line from Twerton Tunnel to the Sydney Gardens, Middlehill and Box Tunnels; the Swindon area including Swindon railway works and village; Maidenhead Railway Bridge; Wharncliffe Viaduct; and London Paddington station.

=== Grade I listed ===
- Avon Bridge, Bristol
- Bristol Temple Meads railway station
- London Paddington station
- Maidenhead Railway Bridge, Berkshire
- Royal Albert Bridge, Saltash, Cornwall
- Starcross pumping house, Devon

=== Grade II* listed ===
- Bath Spa railway station, Somerset
- Box Tunnel, Wiltshire
- Bridgwater railway station, Somerset
- Bristol & Exeter Railway Headquarters, Temple Meads, Bristol
- Chippenham viaduct, Wiltshire
- Maidenhead Railway Bridge, Buckinghamshire
- Moorswater Viaduct, Liskeard, Cornwall
- Mortimer railway station, Berkshire
- Parrett Bridge, Bridgwater, Somerset
- Swindon railway works, Wiltshire (some buildings listed Grade II)
- Windsor Railway Bridge, Berkshire
- Worcester Shrub Hill railway station, Worcestershire

=== Grade II listed ===
- Ashburton goods shed, Devon
- Bovey railway station, Devon
- Bradford-on-Avon railway station, Wiltshire
- Chippenham railway station, Wiltshire
- Dawlish railway station, Devon
- Devil's Bridge, Bleadon, Somerset
- Exeter goods transfer shed, Devon
- Exeter St Thomas railway station, Devon
- Exminster railway station, Devon
- Frome railway station, Somerset
- Gatehampton Railway Bridge, Goring, Berkshire
- Hele and Bradninch goods shed, Devon
- Leamington Spa railway station, Warwickshire
- Maiden Newton railway station, Dorset
- Minehead railway station, Somerset
- Moulsford Railway Bridge, Oxfordshire
- Penzance railway station, Cornwall
- Reading railway station, Berkshire
- Redruth railway station, Cornwall
- St Austell railway station, Cornwall
- St Erth railway station, Cornwall
- Salisbury goods shed, Wiltshire
- Sandford and Banwell railway station, Somerset
- Slough railway station, Berkshire
- Stoke Canon signal box, Devon
- Taunton railway station, Somerset
- Torquay railway station, Devon
- Torre railway station, Devon
- Tregenna Castle Hotel, St Ives, Cornwall
- Wells goods shed, Somerset
- Weston-super-Mare signal box, Somerset
- Williton railway station, Somerset
- Windsor and Eton Central railway station, Berkshire
- Yatton railway station, Somerset

== See also ==
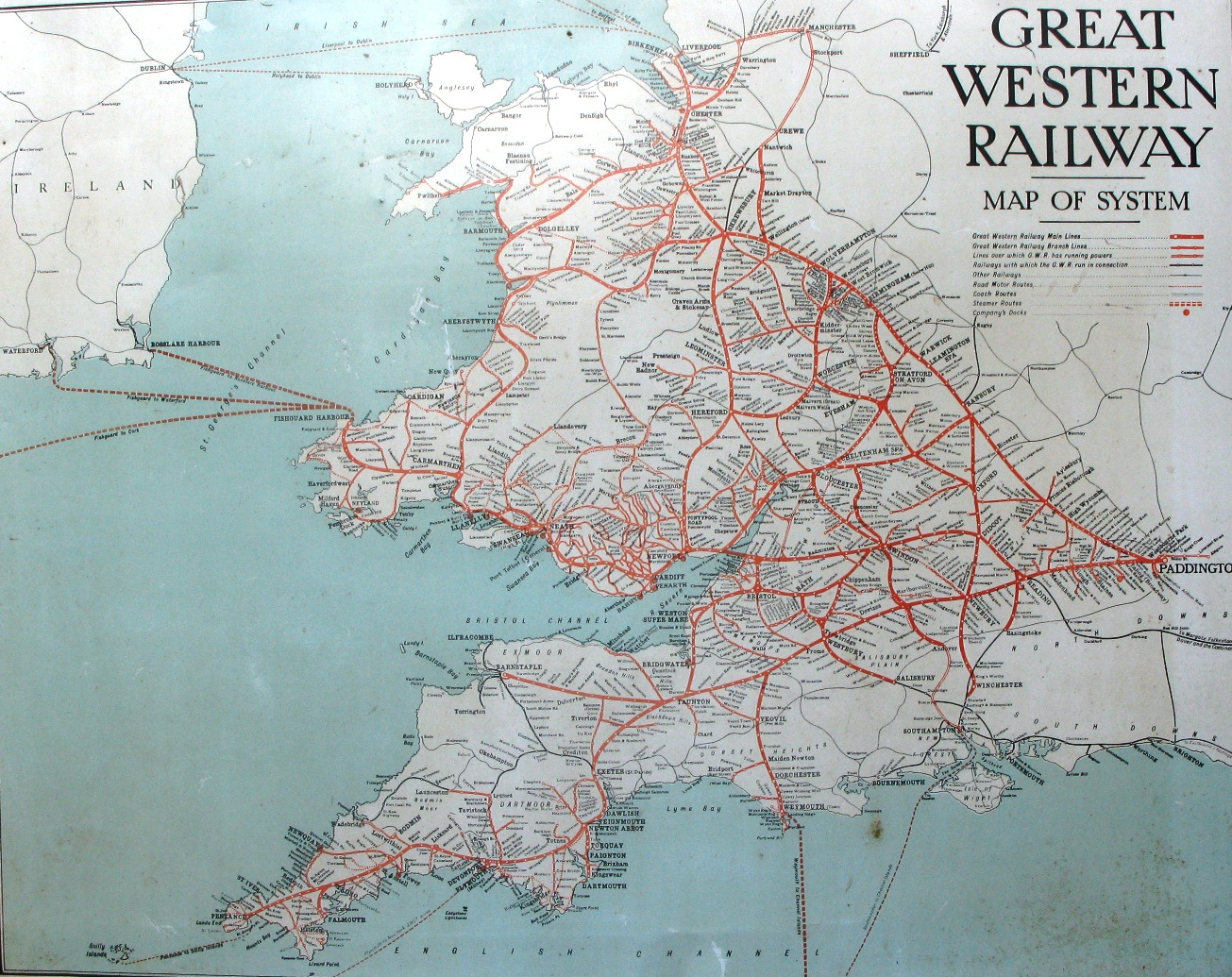
A map of the GWR system

- List of British heritage and private railways
- List of railway museums in the United Kingdom
- National Railway Museum, York
