= Danycoed Halt railway station =

Heritage railway station in Wales

Coordinates: 51°54′27″N 4°19′55″W

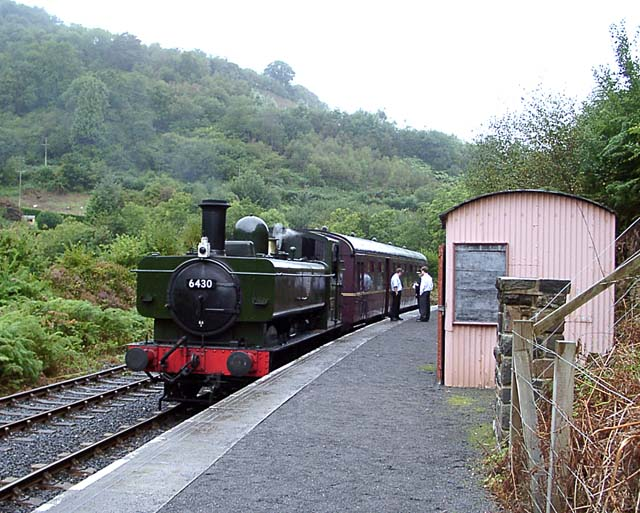
Pannier tank no.6430 waits at Danycoed Halt on the Gwili Steam Railway

Danycoed Halt, which is Welsh for below the trees, was built by the Gwili Railway in the late 1990s and opened in 2001. It is the current northern terminus of the line, but may become redundant when the preserved railway extends over a mile northwards into the nearby Conwyl station site and then further on up to Llanpumpsaint Station some 2 1/2 miles further on.

The halt (along with a nearby "Llwyfan Cerrig" station) did not exist in British Railways days and currently features a four-coach platform, a typical GWR storage hut and other station furniture such as lamp posts and benches. The track layout consists of a simple "run-round" loop (designed to allow the locomotive to run around and couple up to the carriages for the return journey) with a pair of points controlled by a "single throw" lever at the northern end, and a pair controlled by a two-lever ground frame locked by a key on the train staff at the southern end.

Just beyond the north end of the platform, a wrought iron girder bridge crosses the River Gwili. The bridge requires repair and thus inhibits immediate progress into the site of "Conwyl Elfed" station, (Just three bridges across the River Gwili).

Preceding station	Heritage railways	Following station
Terminus	Gwili Railway	Llwyfan Cerrig towards Abergwili Junction
Proposed extension
Conwil towards Llanpumpsaint	Gwili Railway	Llwyfan Cerrig towards Abergwili Junction
