= Llanpumpsaint railway station =

Former railway station in Wales

Llanpumpsaint Station

General information
- Location: Llanpumpsaint, Carmarthen; Wales
- Coordinates: 51.9425°N 4.3068°W
- Grid reference: SN4153429624
- Platforms: 2

Other information
- Status: Disused

History
- Original company: Carmarthen and Cardigan Railway
- Pre-grouping: Great Western Railway

Key dates
- 28 March 1864: Station opened
- February 1965: Station closed
- 1973: Line closed
- 2009: Station Site purchased by the Gwili Railway
Location

Llanpumpsaint was a railway station near the village of Llanpumpsaint, West Wales, serving the hamlet and the rural locale.

== History ==
The Teifi Valley Railway was originally operated by the Carmarthen and Cardigan Railway between Carmarthen and Cynwyl Elfed. In 1864, the line was extended to Pencader and Llandysul. The line was purchased by the Great Western Railway (GWR) and extended to a terminus at Newcastle Emlyn in 1895.

Although passenger services ceased in 1965, goods services continued until 1973 because of the milk train services to the Co-operative Group creamery at Newcastle Emlyn. Although the station has been demolished the dismantled railway still passes through the village and, until recently, the original "Llanpumpsaint" station sign could be seen in front of the Railway Inn.

== The Gwili Railway (Future Preservation) ==
During the 1970s, A group of railway enthusiasts bought eight miles of the old trackbed. In neighbouring Bronwydd, a mile long section of the line was reopened in April 1978 for tourists and named the Gwili Railway.

Since then, the line has been extended north to Danycoed Halt and, in July 2017, reopened south to Abergwili Junction.

The Gwili Railway aims to eventually restore the railway, up the valley to Llanpumpsaint. Eight derelict bridges crossing the Gwili lie between Conwyl and Llanpumsaint, the cost of this restoration work is a major factor delaying the re-opening northwards to Llanpumpsaint.)

Disused railways
Conwil; Line and station closed	Great Western Railway; Carmarthen and Cardigan Railway	Pencader; Line and station closed
Preceding station	Heritage railways	Following station
Proposed extension
Conwil towards Abergwili Junction	Gwili Railway	Terminus
