= Conwil railway station =

Disused railway station in Wales

Conwil Station
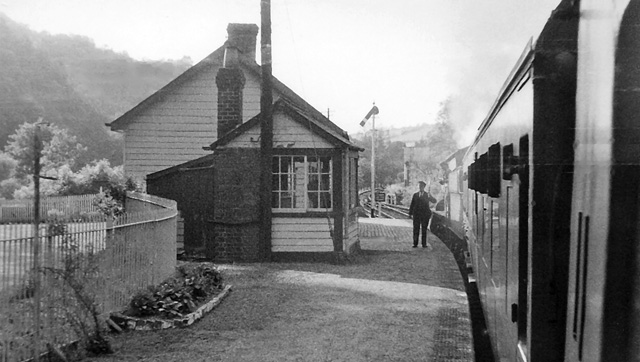
- Conwil station in 1962

General information
- Location: Cynwyl Elfed, Carmarthen; Wales
- Coordinates: 51.9124°N 4.3480°W
- Grid reference: SN3859426371
- Platforms: 2

Other information
- Status: Disused

History
- Original company: Carmarthen and Cardigan Railway

Key dates
- 3 September 1860: Station opened
- 31 December 1860: Station closed
- 12 August 1861: Station re-opened
- 22 February 1965: Station closed to passengers
- 1973: Line closed
- 1978: Station purchased by the Gwili Railway
Location

Conwil was a railway station near the village of Cynwyl Elfed in Carmarthenshire, Wales, serving the hamlet and the rural locale. It was once a thriving railway station, transporting both passenger traffic and locally produced goods, including wool, livestock, milk and timber.

== History ==
The Teifi Valley Railway was originally operated by the Carmarthen and Cardigan Railway between Carmarthen and Cynwyl Elfed. In 1864, the line was extended to Pencader and Llandysul. The line was purchased by the Great Western Railway (GWR).

Although passenger services ceased in 1965, goods services continued until 1973 because of the milk train services to the Co-operative Group creamery at Newcastle Emlyn. As of 2012 the station and platforms still survive.

== The Gwili Railway/Rheilffordd Ager y Gwili ==
A group of railway enthusiasts bought eight miles of the old trackbed. In neighbouring Bronwydd, a 1 mile long section of the line was reopened in spring 1978 for tourists and named the Gwili Railway. The Gwili Railway aims to eventually restore the railway as far north as Llanpumsaint. Plans were underway in 2012 to extend the line southwards to the site of Abergwili Junction. Seven derelict bridges crossing the Gwili lie between Conwyl itself and Llanpumpsaint; the cost of restoring them is a major factor delaying the reopening of the line up to Llanpumpsaint.)

Disused railways
Llanpumpsaint	Carmarthen and Cardigan Railway; Great Western Railway	Brownydd Arms
Preceding station	Heritage railways	Following station
Proposed extension
Llanpumpsaint Terminus	Gwili Railway	Danycoed Halt towards Abergwili Junction
