= Gwili =

Gwili may refer to:

- River Gwili, Wales
- Gwili Railway, a Welsh heritage railway
- John Jenkins (Gwili) (1872-1936), Welsh poet and theologian with the bardic name Gwili
- Gwili Andre (1907–1959), Danish model and actress
