= Bronwydd =

Village and community in Carmarthenshire, Wales

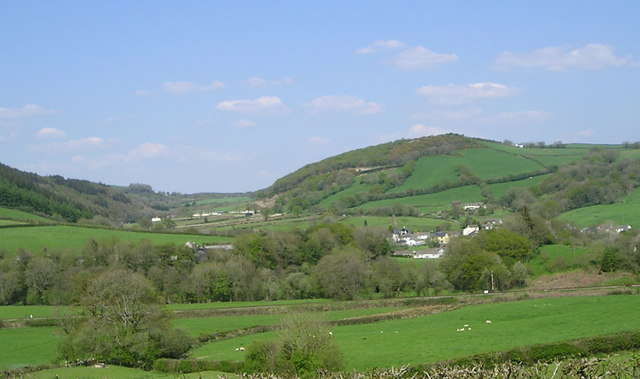

- Location within Carmarthenshire
- Community: Bronwydd
- Principal area: Carmarthenshire
- Preserved county: Dyfed
- Country: Wales
- Sovereign state: United Kingdom
- Post town: Carmarthen
- Postcode district: SA33
- Police: Dyfed-Powys
- Fire: Mid and West Wales
- Ambulance: Welsh
- UK Parliament: Caerfyrddin
- Senedd Cymru – Welsh Parliament: Carmarthen West and South Pembrokeshire
- List of places UK Wales Carmarthenshire 51.896389°N 4.305°W Map of the community

Bronwydd is a village and community in the county of Carmarthenshire, Wales, situated about three miles north of Carmarthen in the valley of the River Gwili. Bronwydd community comprises the village of Bronwydd Arms, a couple of nearby hamlets and a number of working farms in the surrounding area. In Census 2011, it had a population of 564.

Bronwydd Arms railway station is a halt on the Gwili Railway. Cwmgwili mansion, home to a prominent local family, the Philipps, has 17th century features and is a grade II* listed building.

Bronwydd Arms was one of six broadband "not-spots" in Wales - communities without high-speed internet access. In December 2008, the Welsh Assembly Government and BT confirmed that coverage in these areas would be upgraded in April 2009.

The community is bordered by the communities of: Llanpumsaint; Llanllawddog; Abergwili; Carmarthen; Newchurch and Merthyr; and Cynwyl Elfed, all being in Carmarthenshire.

== History ==
The village name is taken from the Bronwydd Arms Inn, which served until 1978 on the main road junction into the village. The public house and adjoining shop were demolished in March 1981. A slate engraving marking the site now stands on the A484 Cardigan road, opposite the B4301 that runs into the village.

The name Hollybrook (pub) is an Anglicised version of Nantcelynen, the name of the smallholding where the pub sits. The site is known to have housed a pub in 1851 by the name of 'Clothiers Arms' but by 1871 it was no longer open.

A detailed history on Bronwydd Arms and surrounding areas was published in 2002 by Carmarthenshire County Council and written by local historian and resident Arwyn Thomas with the title 'Hanes Ardal Bronwydd - A History of the Area'
