= Llwyfan Cerrig railway station =

Heritage railway station in Carmarthenshire, Wales

Llwyfan Cerrig
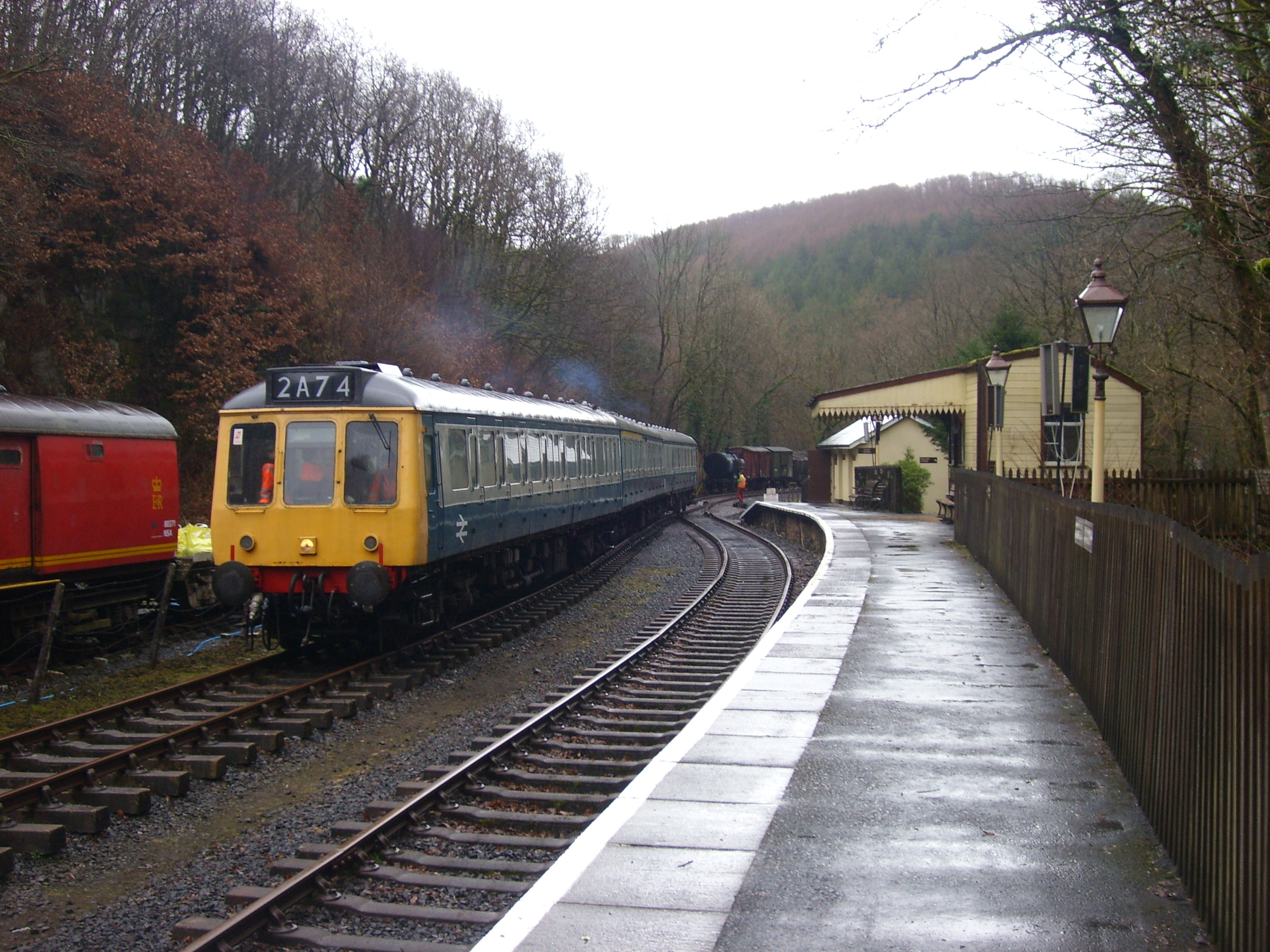

General information
- Location: Carmarthenshire; Wales
- Coordinates: 51.908°N 4.317°W
- Grid reference: SN406258
- System: Station on heritage railway
- Owner: Gwili Railway
- Platforms: 1

History
- Opened: 1988
Location

Llwyfan Cerrig is a heritage railway station on the preserved Gwili Railway. The station (along with a nearby Danycoed halt) previously did not exist before the closure of the Carmarthen to Aberystwyth Line in 1965 and was constructed and later opened in 1988 by the Gwili Railway. The name translates to English as "platform [of] stone".

The station building has been relocated from Felinfach on the Aberaeron branch, while the signal box is a former crossing keeper's hut from Crundale, Pembrokeshire. The station is in close proximity to the River Gwili and is adjacent to the site of an old quarry.

A travelling post office and miniature railway are two additional attractions located at the station for visitors.

Preceding station	Heritage railways	Following station
Danycoed Halt Terminus	Gwili Railway	Bronwydd Arms towards Abergwili Junction
