= Martha Llwyd =

Welsh composer and poet

- Born: Martha Williams; 1766; Cynwyl Elfed
- Died: 16 October 1845 (aged 78–79); Llanpumsaint
- Known for: Hymnwriter

Martha Llwyd (1766 – 16 October 1845), born Martha Williams, was a Welsh poet and Methodist hymnwriter. Due to health problems, Llwyd was unable to walk. She was carried aloft in her chair.

== Early life ==
Martha Williams was born at Nantbendigaid Farm in Cynwyl Elfed, Carmarthenshire. Her family moved to Y Felin farm in the neighbouring parish of Llanpumsaint when she was a baby.

== Writing ==
Although she had limited schooling, Martha Llwyd composed many hymns and poems, and taught them to others. Her hymns became very popular and were sung far and wide during her lifetime. She was regularly visited by the Methodist leader and fellow hymnwriter William Williams Pantycelyn to discuss their work, and it is alleged that some of her hymns were published under his name. Very little of Martha Llwyd's work remains, and most of her hymns have been lost to posterity.

Some of Llywd's hymns were published in 1925, as recalled by John Evan Davies (Rhuddwawr). Welsh novelist and singer-songwriter Fflur Dafydd, a descendant of Llwyd's, wrote a song about her, titled "Martha Llwyd". Another descendant is Dafydd's mother, poet Menna Elfyn.

== Personal life ==
In 1785 Martha Williams married Dafydd Llwyd, a local blacksmith and prominent member of the village's Methodist community. The couple lived together in the centre of the village and had nine children, six boys and three girls, born between 1787 and 1807. The rigours of raising such a large family took its toll on her health and with time she became unable to walk. Nevertheless, she was a faithful member of Bethel Methodist Chapel in the village of Llanpumsaint and was often seen outdoors, carried aloft in her chair by her children or neighbours.

== Death ==
Llwyd died in 1845, aged 79 years, one year after the death of her husband. They share a grave under the yew tree at the parish church in Llanpumsaint. It is inscribed with the anglicised form of their names, David and Martha Lloyd. The Carmarthen County Council installed a historical plaque about Martha Llwyd in Llampusaint in 2011, and hymns by Llwyd were sung at a chapel service of commemoration that year.
