= Pencader railway station =

Disused railway station in Pencader, Carmarthenshire

Pencader

General information
- Location: Pencader, Carmarthenshire; Wales
- Coordinates: 52.001°N 4.2674°W
- Grid reference: SN444360
- Platforms: 2

Other information
- Status: Disused

History
- Original company: Carmarthen and Cardigan Railway
- Pre-grouping: Great Western Railway
- Post-grouping: Great Western Railway; British Rail (Western Region)

Key dates
- 28 March 1864: Opened
- 22 February 1965: Closed to passengers
- 6 September 1965: Closed completely
Location

Pencader railway station served the village of Pencader, Carmarthenshire, Wales, from 1864 to 1965 on the Carmarthen and Cardigan Railway.

== History ==
The station was opened on 28 March 1864 by the Carmarthen and Cardigan Railway. It was situated at the end of Station Road. The single-storey station building had a booking office and waiting rooms. To the south was a large goods yard to the south which had five sidings, one serving a cattle dock and another serving a goods shed. Also to the south was an engine shed, which was built in January 1866. Initially, there was no signal box but one opened at the south end in September 1894. The engine shed closed on 2 March 1918. The station closed to passengers on 22 February 1965 but remained open for parcel traffic until 6 September 1965. The stationmaster's house is now a private residence.

Preceding station	Disused railways	Following station
Llandyssul; Line and station closed	Carmarthen and Cardigan Railway	Llanpumpsaint; Line and station closed
