= Cwmgwili =

Country house in Carmarthenshire, Wales

Coordinates: 51°53′06″N 4°17′27″W

Cwmgwili (Welsh pronunciation) is a country house set in its own grounds approximately 2.5 km (1.6 mi) northwest of Abergwili in Carmarthenshire, Wales. It was probably built in the late sixteenth century.

== History ==
Cwmgwili is a country house, probably built in the late sixteenth century by Charles Vaughan. By the early eighteenth century it is thought to have belonged to Griffith Lloyd, who married Ann Vaughan in or after 1678 and died in 1714. Since then, the house has belonged to the Philipps family.

== The house ==
The house is built on a sloping site beside the River Gwili and has an L-shaped plan. Although some parts are late sixteenth century, most of the house is late seventeenth and early eighteenth century. The west front consists of two storeys and an attic and has five bays. There are panelled chimneys at the end, tall narrow windows and a large gabled stair tower. Other wings run to the north and west. In one of the crosswings, there is a massive chimney-breast which may date from the sixteenth century. At the lower end of the building are two rooms with panelling and pilastered chimney-breasts. The staircase was replaced in about 1900, but the original design was retained.

This house was designated as a Grade II* listed building on 30 November 1966. It is said to have "architectural interest as a house of C16 origin with significant and well-preserved work of the early C18 and early C19, retaining overall external character, with good and consistent interior detail".
