= Bronwydd Arms railway station =

Disused railway station in Wales

Bronwydd Arms
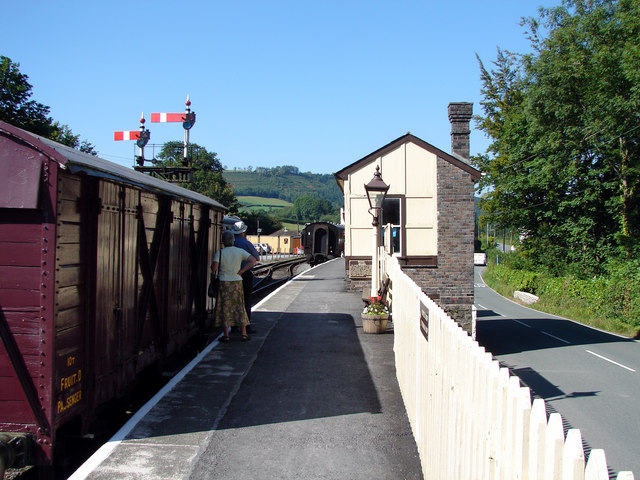

General information
- Location: Bronwydd, Carmarthenshire; Wales
- Coordinates: 51.89155°N 4.30077°W
- Grid reference: SN417239
- System: Station on heritage railway
- Operator: Gwili Railway
- Platforms: 1

History
- Original company: Carmarthen and Cardigan Railway
- Pre-grouping: Great Western Railway

Key dates
- 3 September 1860: Opened
- 31 December 1860: Closed
- 12 August 1861: Reopened
- 22 February 1965: Closed
- 1978: Reopened
Location

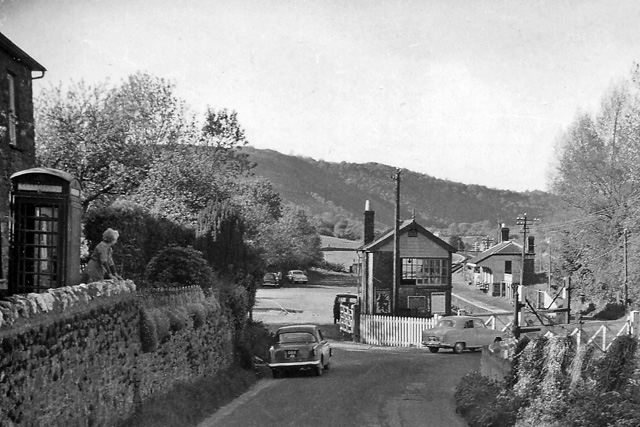
The station entrance in 1962

Bronwydd Arms railway station, originally a stop on the now closed Carmarthen to Aberystwyth Line, is the headquarters of the preserved Gwili Railway, in Wales, United Kingdom.

The station first opened on 3 September 1860 as part of the Carmarthen and Cardigan Railway and closed to passengers on 22 February 1965. Following closure, the station building and signal box were demolished, leaving behind only a bare platform.

In 1978, the Gwili Railway re-opened the station and gradually rebuilt the station building and signal box using redundant buildings recovered from the Heart of Wales Line. The station building was constructed from Llandovery signal box, clad with components from Ammanford (GWR) railway station, while the signal box from Llandybie was also recovered and is now used as the 'new' Bronwydd Arms signal box. A third box from central Wales, Ffairfach, is also in use as a museum.

Other smaller items have been incorporated into the rebuilt station, such as Great Western Railway lamp posts and benches, a parcels shed and a water tower, recovered from Barry Docks in 1979.

The station features a level crossing with wooden gates at the south end where the railway crosses the B4301 road. Passenger trains now currently use the crossing which had been brought into use as part of the railway's extension to Abergwili Junction.

In 2010 the level crossing was renewed to enable the original two-gate system to be re-instated in GWR style, thus re-creating another feature of the original station. The crossing and its gates were completed by August 2011. Work had been concentrated on the extension of the line to Abergwili Junction which later re-opened in July 2017.

Preceding station	Heritage railways	Following station
Llwyfan Cerrig towards Danycoed Halt	Gwili Railway	Abergwili Junction Terminus
Historical railways
Conwil	Great Western Railway; Carmarthen to Aberystwyth Line	Carmarthen

== Sources ==
- Butt, R. V. J. (October 1995). The Directory of Railway Stations: details every public and private passenger station, halt, platform and stopping place, past and present (1st ed.). Sparkford: Patrick Stephens Ltd. ISBN 978-1-85260-508-7. OCLC 60251199. OL 11956311M.
