= List of constituents of the Great Western Railway =

Great Western Railway
- Logo of the Great Western Railway, incorporating the shields, crests and mottoes of the cities of London (left) and Bristol (right)

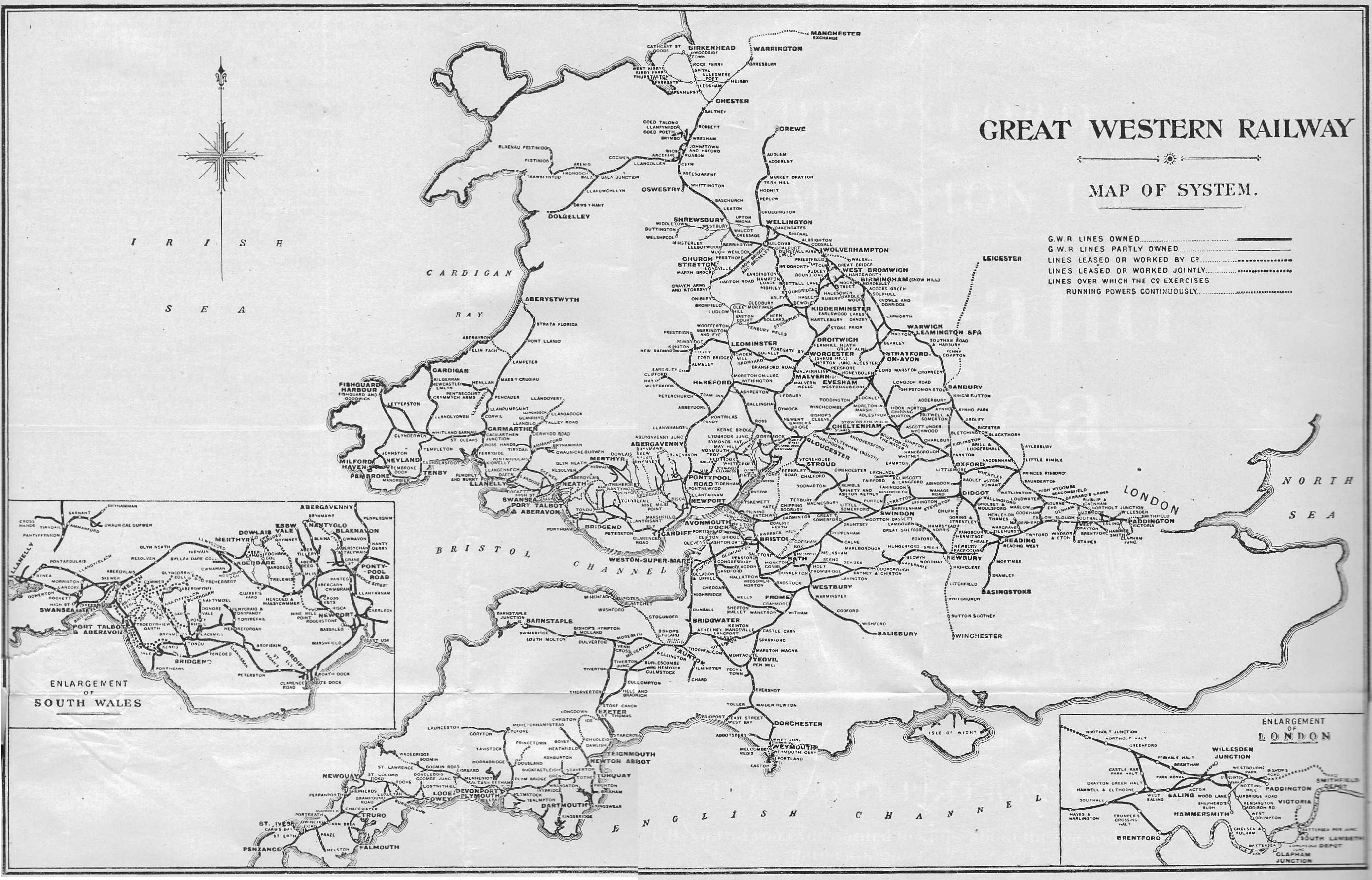
- Map of the railway pre-grouping (1920)

- Map of the railway post-grouping (1926)

History
- 1835: Act of incorporation
- 1838: First train ran
- 1869–92: 7 ft 1/4 in (2,140 mm) Brunel gauge changed to 4 ft 8 1/2 in (1,435 mm) standard gauge
- 1903: Start of road motor services
- 1923: Keeps identity though the Grouping
- 1935: Centenary
- 1948: Nationalised

Successor organisation
- 1948: British Rail, Western Region
Constituent companies
See full list of constituents of the GWR
1854	Shrewsbury and Birmingham Railway; Shrewsbury and Chester Railway
1862	South Wales Railway
1863	West Midland Railway
1876	Bristol and Exeter Railway; South Devon Railway
1889	Cornwall Railway
1922	Rhymney Railway; Taff Vale Railway; Cambrian Railways
1923	Midland & S W Junction Railway

Key locations
- Headquarters: Paddington station, London
- Locale: England; Wales
- Workshops: Swindon; Wolverhampton
- Major stations: Birmingham Snow Hill; Bristol Temple Meads; Cardiff General; London Paddington; Reading General
Route mileage
Mileage shown as at end of year stated
1841	171 miles (275 km)
1863	1,106 miles (1,780 km)
1876	2,023 miles (3,256 km)
1899	2,504 miles (4,030 km)
1919	2,996 miles 68 chains (4,823.0 km)
1921	3,005 miles (4,836 km)
1924	3,797 miles (6,111 km)
1925	3,819 miles 69 chains (6,147.5 km)

The Great Western Railway (GWR) was incorporated by an act of Parliament in 1835 and nationalised on 1 January 1948. During this time it amalgamated with, or purchased outright, many other railway companies. These are listed here in two groups. The early amalgamations (mostly between 1843 and 1900) often involved railway companies that were already being financially supported by the GWR. The Railways Act 1921 brought many new companies into the fold including many successful Welsh lines.

== List key ==
- Company which amalgamated into the GWR (date of amalgamation)
  - Prior amalgamation into the above company
♠ – Companies that were already operated by or leased to the GWR or one of the other absorbed railways before amalgamation. Note: This list is incomplete.
‡ – Companies operating wholly or partly on the 7 ft 1/4 in (2,140 mm) broad gauge at the time that they combined with the GWR. The broad gauge was finally abandoned on 21 May 1892.
§ – Railways which were amalgamated before they opened to traffic.

== Early amalgamations and purchases ==
=== 1840s ===
- Cheltenham and Great Western Union Railway (1 July 1843) (Note: Company that was already operated by or leased to the GWR (or one of the other absorbed railways) before amalgamation.) (Note: Company operating wholly or partly on the 7 ft 1/4 in (2,140 mm) broad gauge at the time that they combined with the GWR. The broad gauge was finally abandoned on 21 May 1892.) ♠ ‡
- Oxford Railway (1844)
- Oxford and Rugby Railway (14 May 1846) (Note: Railways which were amalgamated before they opened to traffic.) ♠ ‡ §
- Berks and Hants Railway (14 July 1846) ♠ ‡ §
- Monmouth and Hereford Railway (1846)
- Great Western and Uxbridge Railway (1847) §
- Birmingham and Oxford Junction Railway (1848) §

=== 1850s ===
Great Western, Birmingham and Chester Railways Act 1854
- Act of Parliament
- Parliament of the United Kingdom
- Long title: An Act to authorize the Consolidation into One Undertaking of the Great Western, the Shrewsbury and Birmingham, and the Shrewsbury and Chester Railways, and the Union into One Company of the Three several Companies to whom the said Railways respectively belong.
- Citation: 17 & 18 Vict. c. ccxxii)

Dates
- Royal assent: 7 August 1854

Text of statute as originally enacted

- Wilts, Somerset and Weymouth Railway (14 March 1850) ♠ ‡ retrospectively authorised by the Great Western Railway Act 1851 (14 & 15 Vict. c. xlviii)
- Shrewsbury and Birmingham Railway (1 September 1854) authorised by the Great Western, Birmingham and Chester Railways Act 1854 (17 & 18 Vict. c. ccxxii)
- Shrewsbury and Chester Railway (1 September 1854) authorised by the Great Western, Birmingham and Chester Railways Act 1854 (17 & 18 Vict. c. ccxxii)
  - Shrewsbury, Oswestry and Chester Junction Railway (1846)
  - North Wales Mineral Railway (1846)

=== 1860s ===
- Hereford, Ross and Gloucester Railway (1862)
- South Wales Railway (1863) ♠ ‡
  - Forest of Dean Railway (1847)
    - Bullo Pill Railway (1826)
- West Midland Railway (1 August 1863)
  - Newport, Abergavenny and Hereford Railway (1860)
  - Oxford, Worcester and Wolverhampton Railway (1860)
    - Stratford and Moreton Railway (1845)
  - Worcester and Hereford Railway (1860)
- Vale of Neath Railway (1 February 1865)
  - Swansea and Neath Railway (1863)
  - Aberdare Valley Railway (1864)
- Wellington and Drayton Railway (1866) §
- Wycombe Railway (31 January 1867) ♠
- Bristol and South Wales Union Railway (1 August 1868) ♠ ‡
- Tenbury and Bewdley Railway (12 July 1869)

=== 1870s ===
- Stourbridge Railway (1 February 1870)
- Severn Valley Railway (1870)
- Great Western and Brentford Railway (1 July 1871) ♠
- Wallingford and Watlington Railway (2 December 1871)
- Wrexham and Minera Railway (1871)
- Llanelly Railway (1 January 1873
- Briton Ferry Dock and Railway (1873)
- Gloucester and Dean Forest Railway (30 June 1874) ♠
- East Somerset Railway (2 December 1874) ♠
- Burton on Water Railway (1874)
- Bristol and Exeter Railway (1 January 1876) ‡
  - Chard and Taunton Railway (1863) §
  - Chedder Valley and Yatton Railway (1865) §
  - Exe Valley Railway (1875) §
- South Devon Railway (1 February 1876) ‡
  - Dartmouth and Torbay Railway (1862)
  - South Devon and Tavistock Railway (1865)
  - Launceston and South Devon Railway (1869)
  - Moretonhampstead and South Devon Railway (1872)
- West Cornwall Railway (1 February 1876) ‡
  - Hayle Railway (1846)
- Pontypool, Caerleon and Newport Railway (1876)
- Wellington and Drayton Railway (30 August 1877) ♠
- Bala and Dolgelley Railway (1877)

=== 1880s ===
- Monmouthshire Railway and Canal (1 August 1880) ♠
- Culm Valley Light Railway (5 August 1880) ♠
- Malmesbury Railway (6 August 1880) ♠
- Mitcheldean Road and Forest of Dean Junction Railway (1880) §
- Ely and Clydach Valleys Railway (1880)
- Carmarthen and Cardigan Railway (1 July 1882)
- Berks and Hants Extension Railway (10 August 1882) ♠
- Swindon and Highworth Railway (1882) §
- Torbay and Brixham Railway (1 January 1883) ♥
- Stratford on Avon Railway (1 July 1883) ♠
  - Alcester Railway (1878)
- Watlington and Princes Risborough Railway (31 December 1883)
- Llynvi and Ogmore Railway (1883)
  - Llynvi Valley Railway (1866)
    - Duffryn, Llynvi and Porthcawl Railway (1847)
  - Ogmore Valley Railway (1866)
    - Ely Valley Extension Railway (1865)
  - Cardiff and Ogmore Valley Railway (1876)
- Coleford Railway (1884)
- Bristol and Portishead Pier and Railway (1884)
- Bristol and North Somerset Railway (1884)
- Faringdon Railway (1 July 1886)
- Coleford, Monmouth, Usk and Pontypool Railway (1887)
- Worcester, Bromyard and Leominster Railway (1 July 1888)
- Leominster and Bromyard Railway (1888)
- Kingsbridge and Salcombe Railway (1888)
- Cornwall Railway (1 July 1889) ‡
- Llanelly Railway and Dock (1889)

=== 1890s ===
- Whitland and Cardigan Railway (1 July 1890)
- Witney Railway (1890)
- East Gloucestershire Railway (1890)
- Calne Railway (1 July 1892) ♠
- Newent Railway (1 July 1892)
- Ross and Ledbury Railway (1 July 1892)
- Wellington and Severn Junction Railway (1 July 1892)
- East Usk Railway (1 July 1892) §
- Oldbury Railway (1894)
- Tiverton and North Devon Railway (1894)
- Cornwall Minerals Railway (1 July 1896) ♠
  - Newquay and Cornwall Junction Railway (1873)
  - Treffry Tramroads (1873)
  - Lostwithiel and Fowey Railway (1892)
- Abbotsbury Railway (7 August 1896)
- Corwen and Bala Railway (7 August 1896)
- Llangollen and Corwen Railway (7 August 1896)
- Marlborough Railway (7 August 1896)
- Milford Railway (7 August 1896)
- Much Wenlock and Severn Junction Railway (7 August 1896)
- Vale of Llangollen Railway (7 August 1896)
- Wenlock Railway (7 August 1896)
- Banbury and Cheltenham Direct Railway (1 July 1897)
- Buckfastleigh, Totnes and South Devon Railway (1 July 1897)
- Great Marlow Railway (1 July 1897)
- Kington and Eardisley Railway (1 July 1897)
- Nantwich and Market Drayton Railway (1 July 1897) ♠
- Pembroke and Tenby Railway (1 July 1897)
- Woodstock Railway (1 July 1897)
- Minehead Railway (6 August 1897) ♠
- North Pembrokeshire and Fishguard Railway (1 July 1898)
  - Narberth Road and Maenclochog Railway (1881)
- Helston Railway (2 August 1898) ♠
- Leominster and Kington Railway (2 August 1898)
- Golden Valley Railway (1 July 1899) ♠

=== 1900s ===
- Birmingham and Henley-in-Arden Railway (1 July 1900)
- Birmingham, North Warwickshire and Stratford on Avon Railway (1 July 1900)
- Staines and West Drayton Railway (1 July 1900) ♠
- Bridport Railway (26 July 1901) ♠
- Devon and Somerset Railway (26 July 1901) ♠
- Ely Valley Railway (South Wales) (11 August 1903)
- Abingdon Railway (1904)
- Lambourn Valley Railway (1 July 1905)
- Wye Valley Railway (4 August 1905)
- Liskeard and Caradon Railway (1909)

=== 1910s ===
- Bala and Festiniog Railway (26 July 1910)
  - Festiniog and Blaenau Railway (13 April 1883)
- Manchester and Milford Railway (1 July 1911)

== Railways Act 1921 ==
The Railways Act 1921 provided for the compulsory amalgamation of many of Britain's railways. 27 of the larger railways (termed "Constituent Companies" by the act) would amalgamate on or before 1 January 1923 to create four larger railways (termed "Amalgamated Companies"). About 100 of the smaller railways (termed "Subsidiary Companies") would be absorbed by either the Constituent Companies or the Amalgamated Companies. In what was termed the "Western Group", the Constituent Companies were:

- Alexandra (Newport and South Wales) Docks and Railway 10 1/2 miles (17 km)
- Barry Railway 68 miles (109 km)
- Cambrian Railways 295 1/4 miles (472 km)
- Cardiff Railway 11 3/4 miles (19 km)
- Great Western Railway
- Rhymney Railway 51 miles (82 km)
- Taff Vale Railway 124 1/2 miles (199 km)

These amalgamated on 1 January 1922, and the company continued to use the name Great Western Railway, and its new board of directors included representatives from all seven of the constituent companies. There was no board representation for the Subsidiary Companies, which were:

- Brecon and Merthyr Tydfil Junction Railway (1 July 1922) 59 3/4 miles (97 km)
- Burry Port and Gwendreath Valley Railway (1 July 1922) 21 miles (34 km)
- Cleobury, Mortimer and Ditton Priors Railway (1 January 1922) 12 miles (19 km)
- Didcot, Newbury and Southampton Railway (1923) 42 3/4 miles (68 km) ♠
- Exeter Railway 8 3/4 miles (14 km) ♠
- Forest of Dean Central Railway 5 miles (8 km) ♠
- Gwendreath Valleys Railway (1 January 1923) 3 miles (5 km) ♠
- Lampeter, Aberayron and New Quay Light Railway 12 miles (19 km) ♠
- Liskeard and Looe Railway 9 miles (14 km) ♠
- Llanelly and Mynydd Mawr Railway (1 January 1923) 13 miles (21 km)
- Mawddwy Railway ♠
- Midland and South Western Junction Railway (1 July 1923) 63 1/4 miles (101 km)
- Neath and Brecon Railway (1 July 1922)
- Penarth Extension Railway 1 3/4 miles (3 km) ♠
- Penarth Harbour, Dock and Railway 9 3/4 miles (16 km) ♠
- Port Talbot Railway (1 January 1922) 35 miles (56 km)
- Princetown Railway (1922) 10 1/2 miles (17 km)
- Rhondda and Swansea Bay Railway (1 January 1922) 29 miles (46 km) ♠
- Ross and Monmouth Railway 12 1/2 miles (20 km) ♠
- South Wales Mineral Railway 13 miles (21 km) ♠
- Teign Valley Railway 7 3/4 miles (12 km) ♠
- Vale of Glamorgan Railway 20 3/4 miles (33 km) ♠
- Van Railway ♠
- Welshpool and Llanfair Light Railway ♠
- West Somerset Railway (1922) 14 1/2 miles (23 km) ♠
- Wrexham and Ellesmere Railway ♠

After the grouping, two organisations voluntarily sold their operations and locomotives to the GWR. Both of these worked the railways of Swansea Docks:

- Swansea Harbour Trust (1 July 1923)
- Powlesland and Mason (contractors at Swansea Docks) (1 January 1924)

Later, the GWR purchased the Corris Railway from the Bristol Tramways and Carriage Company Ltd, together with associated road services and vehicles.

- Corris Railway (4 August 1930)

== See also ==
- History of rail transport in Great Britain
- List of early British railway companies
