= Llanllawddog =

Community in Carmarthenshire, Wales

Coordinates: 51°57′N 4°14′W

- Community
- Chapel at Llanllawddog

- Location within Carmarthenshire
- Principal area: Carmarthenshire
- Country: Wales
- Sovereign state: United Kingdom
- Police: Dyfed-Powys
- Fire: Mid and West Wales
- Ambulance: Welsh
- List of places UK Wales Carmarthenshire Map of the community

Llanllawddog (Welsh pronunciation) is a community located in Carmarthenshire, south-west Wales. The population of the community taken at the 2011 census was 703, and at the 2021 census this had increased to 765.

Llanllawddog is bordered by the Carmarthenshire communities of Llanfihangel-ar-Arth, Llanfihangel Rhos-y-Corn, Llanegwad, Abergwili, Bronwydd, and Llanpumsaint.

The community includes the settlements of Rhydargaeau and Pontarsais, which both lie on the A485 road. The nearest town is Carmarthen, about 4 miles to the south.

The community is named for the church of St Llawddog (possibly Llawddog ap Dingad, 6th century), which is about one mile north-east of Pontarsais. There are two other parishes in Carmarthenshire connected with this saint. The River Gwili flows from east to west through the community.

For elections to Carmarthenshire County Council Llanllawddog is part of the Abergwili electoral ward.

The 17th/18th century scholar and collector of Welsh manuscripts, Iaco ab Dewi, is buried in the parish cemetery. He came from Llandysul.
