= Cynwyl Elfed =

Village and community in Carmarthenshire, Wales

Coordinates: 51°55′18″N 4°22′03″W

- Village and community
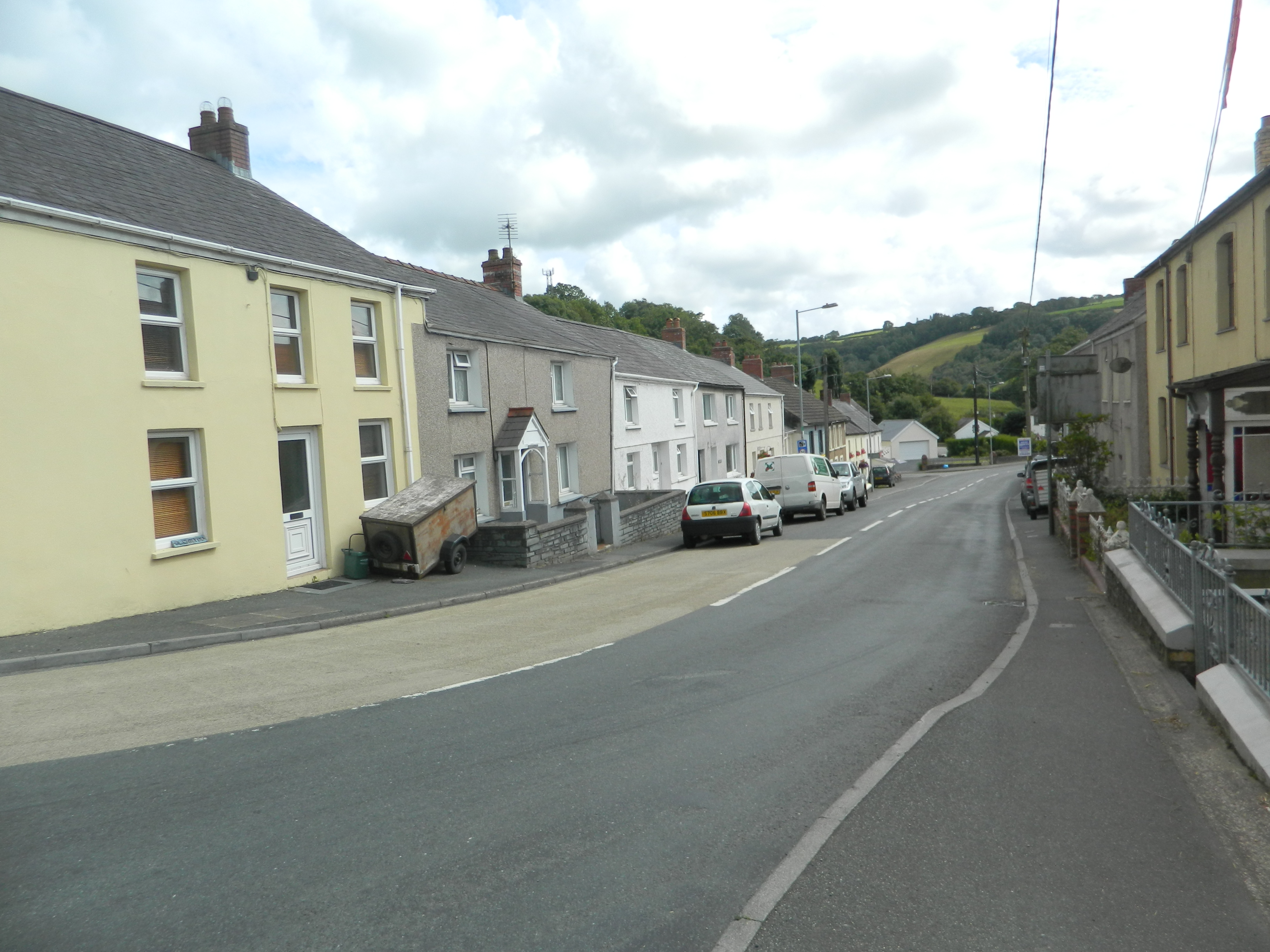
- Surgeon St, Cynwyl Elfed

- Location within Carmarthenshire
- Principal area: Carmarthenshire
- Country: Wales
- Sovereign state: United Kingdom
- Police: Dyfed-Powys
- Fire: Mid and West Wales
- Ambulance: Welsh
- List of places UK Wales Carmarthenshire Map of the community

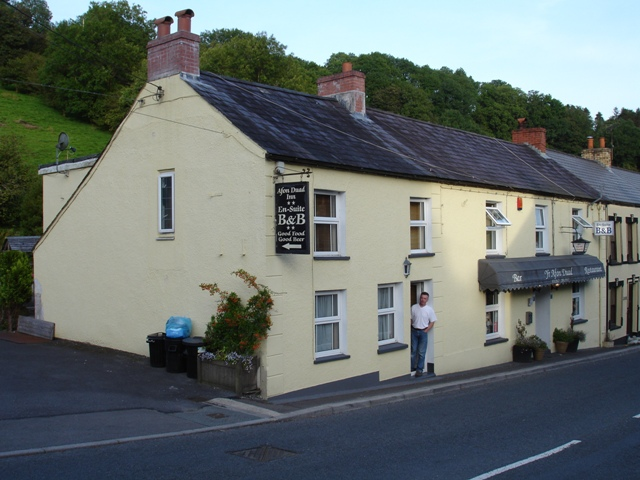
Afon Duad Inn, Cwmduad, near Cynwyl Elfed

Cynwyl Elfed (Welsh pronunciation; sometimes Conwyl and formerly anglicised as Conwil Elvet or Conwil in Elvet) is a village and community in the county of Carmarthenshire, Wales. The community includes the villages of Cynwyl Elfed, Blaenycoed and Cwmduad. It is situated about 5 miles (8.0 km) north of Carmarthen and had a population of 953 in 2001, increasing to 1,044 at the 2011 Census.

The area around the village has yielded a significant number of Roman artefacts, including a statue of Diana. It was the most important centre of the commote of Elfed in the Middle Ages.

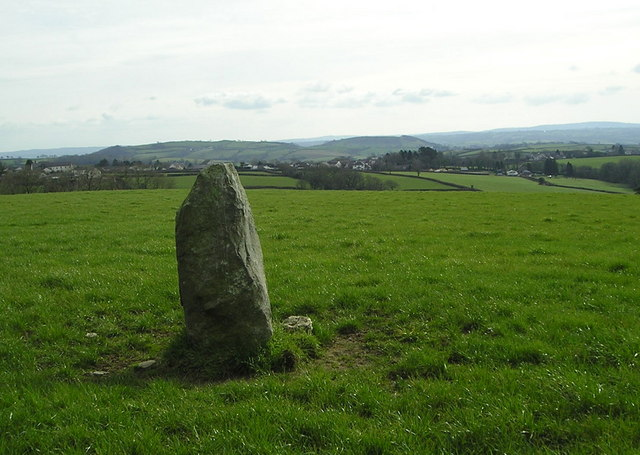
Standing stone. The village of Peniel can be seen in the distance

Cynwyl Elfed transmitting station stands on high ground to the north of the village.

== Governance ==
An electoral ward of the same name exists. This ward stretches south to Newchurch and Merthyr. There is a community council of the same name and also the ward is represented by one councillor in Carmarthenshire County Council. The total population of this ward taken at the 2011 Census was 3,018.

The community is bordered by the communities of: Llangeler; Llanfihangel-ar-Arth; Llanpumsaint; Bronwydd; Newchurch and Merthyr; Abernant; Trelech; and Cenarth, all being in Carmarthenshire.

== River ==
The River Gwili (Welsh: Afon Gwili) is a tributary of the River Towy, the longest river entirely in Wales. Rising to the east of Llanllawddog, in the Brechfa Forest, it runs west, through Llanpumsaint, to its confluence with the River Duad, just south of Cynwyl Elfed village. Then its course turns to the southeast, running through Bronwydd before joining the River Towy at Abergwili.

== Railway ==
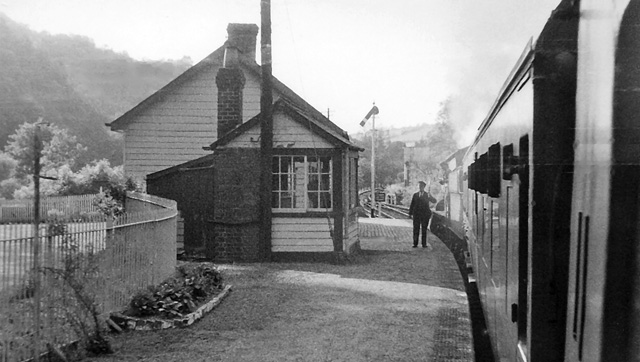
Cynwyl Elfed railway station in 1962

The Gwili Railway (Welsh: Rheilffordd Gwili) is a Welsh standard gauge heritage railway from the former Abergwili Junction, near Carmarthen, along a short section of the former Carmarthen to Aberystwyth railway that closed for passenger traffic in 1965. Based at Bronwydd Arms railway station, the Gwili Railway currently owns 8 miles (13 km) of the old railway line, which once ran past Cynwyl Elfed.

== Roads ==
The A484 is an A road from Swansea to Cardigan, and runs through Cynwyl Elfed affording connections to Carmarthen and the A40.

== Amenities ==
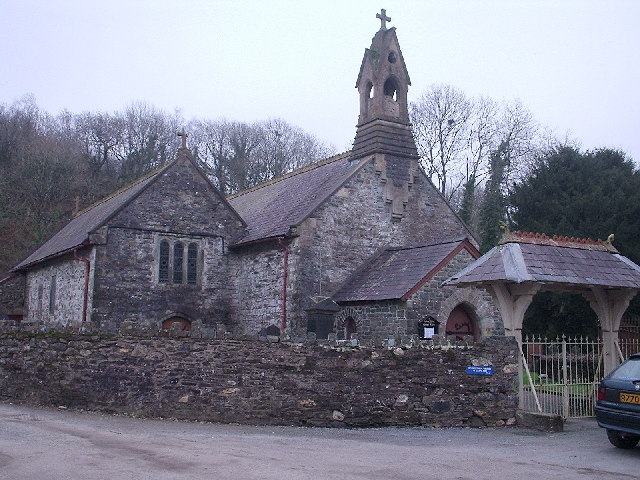
St Cynwyl's parish church

The parish church of St Cynwyl of the Church in Wales, founded in the 6th century, contains 14th century elements and a barrel roof. It is a grade II* listed building.

Cynwyl Elfed has a primary school.

== Notable people ==
- Howell Elvet Lewis (1860–1953), the Independent minister, hymn-writer, poet, known as Elfed. The house where he was born, 'Y Gangell' is to the west of Cynwyl Elfed near Blaenycoed and contains a small exhibition of his life.
- David Lyn (1927–2012), a Welsh television, film and stage actor; raised on a smallholding in Cynwyl Elfed
- Denzil Davies (1938–2018), Welsh Labour Party politician, Member of Parliament (MP) for Llanelli from 1970 to 2005, and a member of the Privy Council.
