= Cwmduad =

Village in Carmarthenshire, Wales

Coordinates: 51°57′25″N 4°22′0″W

- Location within Carmarthenshire
- OS grid reference: SN375313
- Community: Cynwyl Elfed
- Principal area: Carmarthenshire
- Preserved county: Dyfed
- Country: Wales
- Sovereign state: United Kingdom
- Post town: CARMARTHEN
- Postcode district: SA33
- Police: Dyfed-Powys
- Fire: Mid and West Wales
- Ambulance: Welsh
- UK Parliament: Caerfyrddin
- Senedd Cymru – Welsh Parliament: Carmarthen West and South Pembrokeshire

Cwmduad (Welsh "Cwm" valley + "duad" blackness (river Duad, in English Blackcombe)) is a village in Carmarthenshire, West Wales.

== Location ==
Cwmduad is located on the A484, just north of Cynwyl Elfed. The village is found at the confluence of the River Duad and River Bele. The nearest major settlements are Carmarthen to the South and Newcastle Emlyn to the North.

== History ==
A tollgate was located in Cwmduad village. There was at one time also a village school although this has since closed and the nearest primary school is now found at neighbouring Cynwyl Elfed. The village's baptist church was built in 1869 and restored in 1906.

In 2019, during Storm Callum, a landslide near Cwmduad caused the fatality of a 21-year-old male.
