= Llanpumsaint =

Village and community in Carmarthenshire, Wales

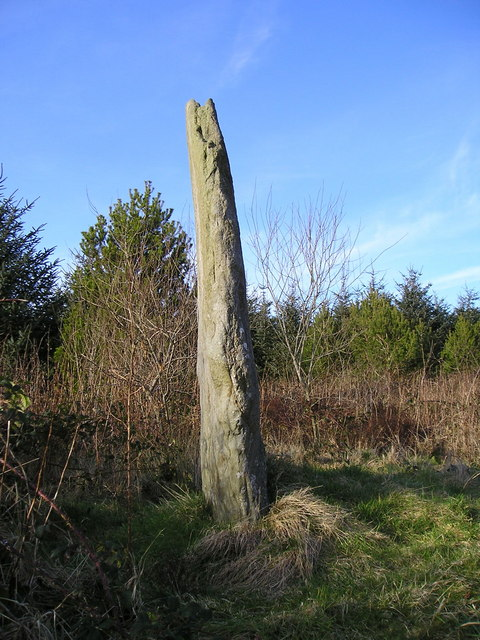
- Gareg Hir standing stone

- Location within Carmarthenshire
- Population: 734 (20011)
- OS grid reference: SN415295
- Community: Llanpumsaint
- Principal area: Carmarthenshire
- Preserved county: Dyfed
- Country: Wales
- Sovereign state: United Kingdom
- Post town: CARMARTHEN
- Postcode district: SA33
- Dialling code: 01267
- Police: Dyfed-Powys
- Fire: Mid and West Wales
- Ambulance: Welsh
- UK Parliament: Caerfyrddin
- Senedd Cymru – Welsh Parliament: Carmarthen West and South Pembrokeshire
- List of places UK Wales Carmarthenshire 51.939°N 4.3011°W Map of the community

Llanpumsaint (Welsh pronunciation; Welsh "Llan" church + "pum" five + "saint" saint(s)) is a village and community in Carmarthenshire, Wales. In the 2001 UK Census, Llanpumsaint community had a population of 595. It is not to be confused with Pumsaint, a small village some distance away on the River Cothi. The population increased in 2011 to 734, and thus the percentage of Welsh speakers declined.

Llanpumsaint community comprises the neighbouring hamlet of Nebo, the spiritual community and temple at Skanda Vale and a number of farms.

According to the 2001 Census, 50% of those living in Llanpumsaint community are able to speak, read and write Welsh, this is well above the 39% average recorded for Carmarthenshire in the same census. The council has faced controversy for choosing to hold its meetings only in English.

== Location ==
Llanpumsaint is located on a minor road that joins the B4336 just north of Bronwydd Arms and the A486 at Llandysul and Pentrecwrt. The village straddles the River Gwili between Bronwydd and Llanllawddog, at the confluence of two small tributaries, Nant-cwm-cerwyn and Nant Aeron. The nearest major settlement is Carmarthen, approximately 4.5 miles (7 km) away by road.

The community is bordered by the communities of: Llanfihangel-ar-Arth; Llanllawddog; Bronwydd; and Cynwyl Elfed, all being in Carmarthenshire.

== History ==
=== Foundation ===
The name Llanpumsaint translates as "Parish of the Five Saints" ("Llan" means church or enclosed area of land). The five saints were brothers named Gwyn, Gwynno, Gwynoro, Ceitho and Celynin who came from the nearby hamlet of Cynwyl Gaeo. They were sons of Cynyr Barbtruc (or "cut-beard"; Welsh: "Cynyr Farfdrwch") and descendants of Cunedda the Imperator (Welsh: "Cynyr Wledig").

The five brothers are said to have built the Llanpumsaint Parish Church around the 5th or 6th Century. It is thought that they built the church on a pre-existing pagan site. There are also five pools in Nant-cwm-cerwyn which are named after each of the saints. These pools were the destination for pilgrimages to the village during the Middle Ages. Such pilgrimages tended to take place around the time of St. David's Day.

The names of the five saints appear elsewhere in the area. One of the brothers, Ceitho, is the patron saint of Llangeitho in Ceredigion where he founded an abbey and lived as a hermit there within. Another example is St Celynin's Church in the neighbouring community of Bronwydd which was built as a missionary church to Llanpumsaint in 1894.

=== Evidence of medieval settlement at Pant Glas ===
At Allt Pant Glas, to the south of Llanpumsaint village, there are earthworks indicating the site of a possible medieval timber castle of the motte and bailey or ringwork form.

=== Railway village 1864-1965 ===
In 1860 the Carmarthen and Cardigan Railway was opened. "Llanpumpsaint" station was opened in 1864 when the line was extended as far as Llandysul. At the height of its operation, the Carmarthen Aberystwyth Line linked Llanpumsaint to Carmarthen in the south (connecting to the West Wales Line) and to Cardigan, Aberaeron and Aberystwyth (connecting to the Cambrian Line) in the north.

The railway served the village for over 100 years until the line finally closed (having ceased carrying passengers in February 1965 and the station). Freight trains continued to pass through the village on their way between Felin Fach and Carmarthen until 1973 when the line was finally closed and lifted.

The dismantled railway still passes through the village and, until recently, the original "Llanpumpsaint" station sign could be seen in front of the Railway Inn. In neighbouring Bronwydd, a 1 mile long section of the line was reopened in 1978 for tourists and named the Gwili Railway. The line has been extended Southwards to the site of Abergwili Junction. The Gwili Railway aims to eventually restore the railway as far as Llanpumpsaint. However, the logistics of restoring the track as far north as Llanpumsaint (there are around seven derelict bridges crossing the Gwili between Conwyl Elfed and Llanpumsaint) mean that there is currently no timetable for restoration.

Preceding station	Heritage railways	Following station
Terminus	Gwili Railway; Future Extension	Conwyl; Proposed

== Llanpumsaint Parish Church ==
Llanpumsaint Parish Church (The Church of St Celynin, Ceitho, Gwyn, Gwyno and Gwynoro) is a medieval church belonging to the Church in Wales. The precise age of the church is unknown. At the time of the Religious census of 1851, the parish priest William Henry Powell attested that the church had been "...consecrated from time immemorial." There is a 6th-century Ogham stone in the churchyard which may give some indication of the church's age. The original church building was restored in 1882. An extension to the nave and the porch date from 1933. The east window of the nave was designed by Mildred "Elsi" Eldridge, the wife of renowned Welsh poet R. S. Thomas.

Very near to Llanpumsaint Parish Church is Bethel Presbyterian Chapel which was originally built in 1796. Nearer to the old railway line there is also Caersalem Baptist Chapel which was built in 1904.

== Skanda Vale ==
Skanda Vale, also known as "The Community of the Many Names of God", is an interfaith temple/monastery located in the Llanpumsaint Community, at a distance of 1.6 miles (3 km) from Llanpumsaint village. The temple holds festivals which are attended by pilgrims from all over the UK and even further afield. Skanda Vale also runs a hospice and is a registered charity.

Valli the elephant was given to Skanda Vale as a gift from the Sri Lankan president in 1981.

== Notable people ==
- Martha Llwyd (1766–1845) Welsh poet and hymnist.
- William Williams (1788–1865) Welsh businessman based in London, Radical MP 1835–1847 and 1850–1865
- David Owen (Brutus) (1795–1866), a satirical writer, editor and preacher.
- Timothy Davies (politician) (1857–1951) Welsh businessman based in London, Mayor of Fulham, Liberal MP 1906–1920
- Jennie Eirian Davies (1925–1982), Welsh politician and magazine editor.
