= Abergwili Junction railway station =

Railway station in Wales

Abergwili Junction Cyffordd Abergwili
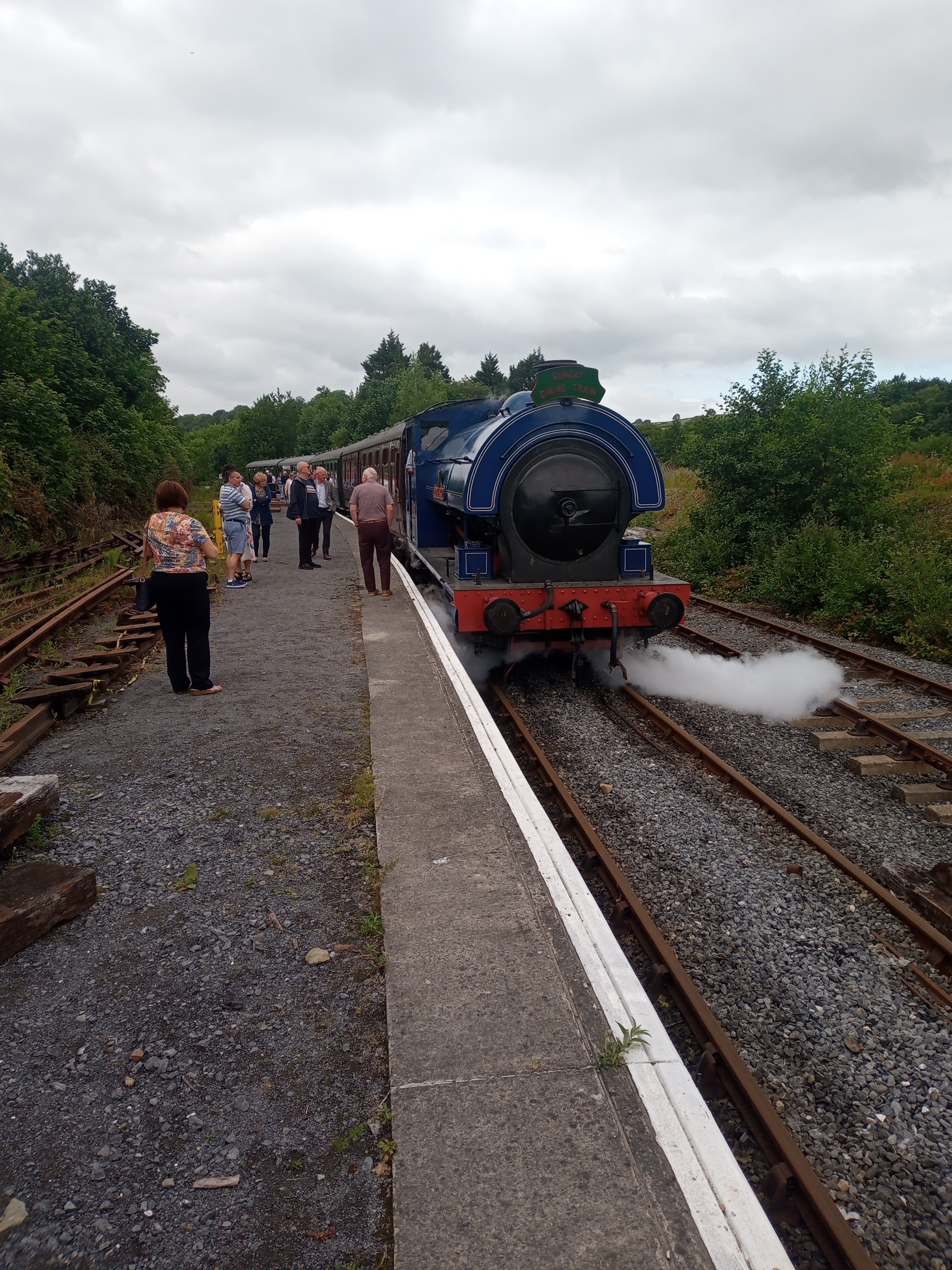
- Abergwili Junction in 2022

General information
- Location: Abergwili, Carmarthenshire; Wales
- Coordinates: 51.8689°N 4.2808°W
- System: Station on heritage railway
- Operator: Gwili Railway
- Platforms: 1

Key dates
- 1 July 2017: Line opened
- 7 April 2023: Station opened
Location

Abergwili Junction railway station in the village of Abergwili, Carmarthenshire, Wales, is the southern terminus of the Gwili Railway.

== History ==
Following the closure of the Carmarthen-Aberystwyth line in 1973, the Gwili Railway Preservation Company was formed with the aim of preserving at least 8 miles of trackbed between Abergwili Junction and Llanpumpsaint. By 1978, this stretch of trackbed had been acquired, with an initial steam-hauled service operating on a one-mile section out of Bronwydd Arms.

It had always been a long-term aim of the railway to recommence service south of Bronwydd Arms towards the village of Abergwili. However, the construction of the Carmarthen by-pass (built between 1997 and 1999) over the former line towards Carmarthen indicated that any further southern expansion was impossible.

In 2007, the former Swansea Vale Railway preservation project closed, merging with the Gwili Railway. This meant track materials and signalling equipment, as well as a footbridge and a water tank and crane became available to the project. By 2011, over a mile of track had been laid from Bronwydd Arms towards Abergwili.

The line was formally opened on 1 July 2017 by Sylvia Davies, whose late husband, Geler Davies, had driven the last train between Carmarthen and Aberystwyth on February 22 1965.

On 7 April 2023, the station was opened to passengers starting their journeys at Abergwili. This was made possible by the construction of a 300-space car park, and the further development of station facilities. These will continue, first with the construction of the Dan Do shed, which will enable a transition of the railway's headquarters from their current location at Bronwydd Arms to Abergwili.

== Service ==
Preceding station	Heritage railways	Following station
Bronwydd Arms towards Danycoed Halt	Gwili Railway	Terminus
