= River Gwili =

River in Carmarthenshire, Wales

Coordinates: 51°46′N 4°17′W

For the river which flows into the River Loughor see Afon Gwili (Loughor)

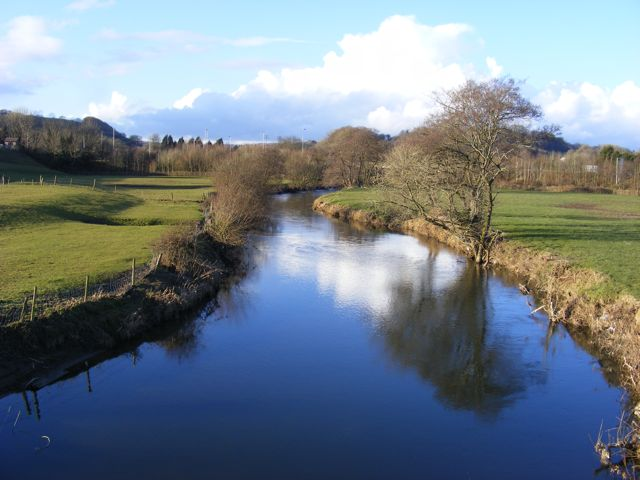
The Gwili near Abergwili

The River Gwili (Welsh: Afon Gwili) in Carmarthenshire, is a tributary of the River Towy, the longest river entirely in Wales. Its headwater is found east of Llanllawddog, in the Brechfa Forest. It runs west, through Llanpumsaint, to its confluence with the River Duad, just south of Cynwyl Elfed village. Here its course turns to the southeast, running through Bronwydd before joining the River Towy at Abergwili.

The River Gwili gives its name to a number of settlements, as well as the Glangwili General Hospital. The Carmarthen Aberystwyth Line once followed the course of the river between Abergwili and Llanpumsaint and the dismantled railway line can still be seen right along the valley. In 1978 a section of the line was reopened in Bronwydd as a heritage railway and was given the name Gwili Railway.
