= Gwili Railway =

Heritage railway in Carmarthenshire, Wales

Gwili Railway Rheilffordd Gwili
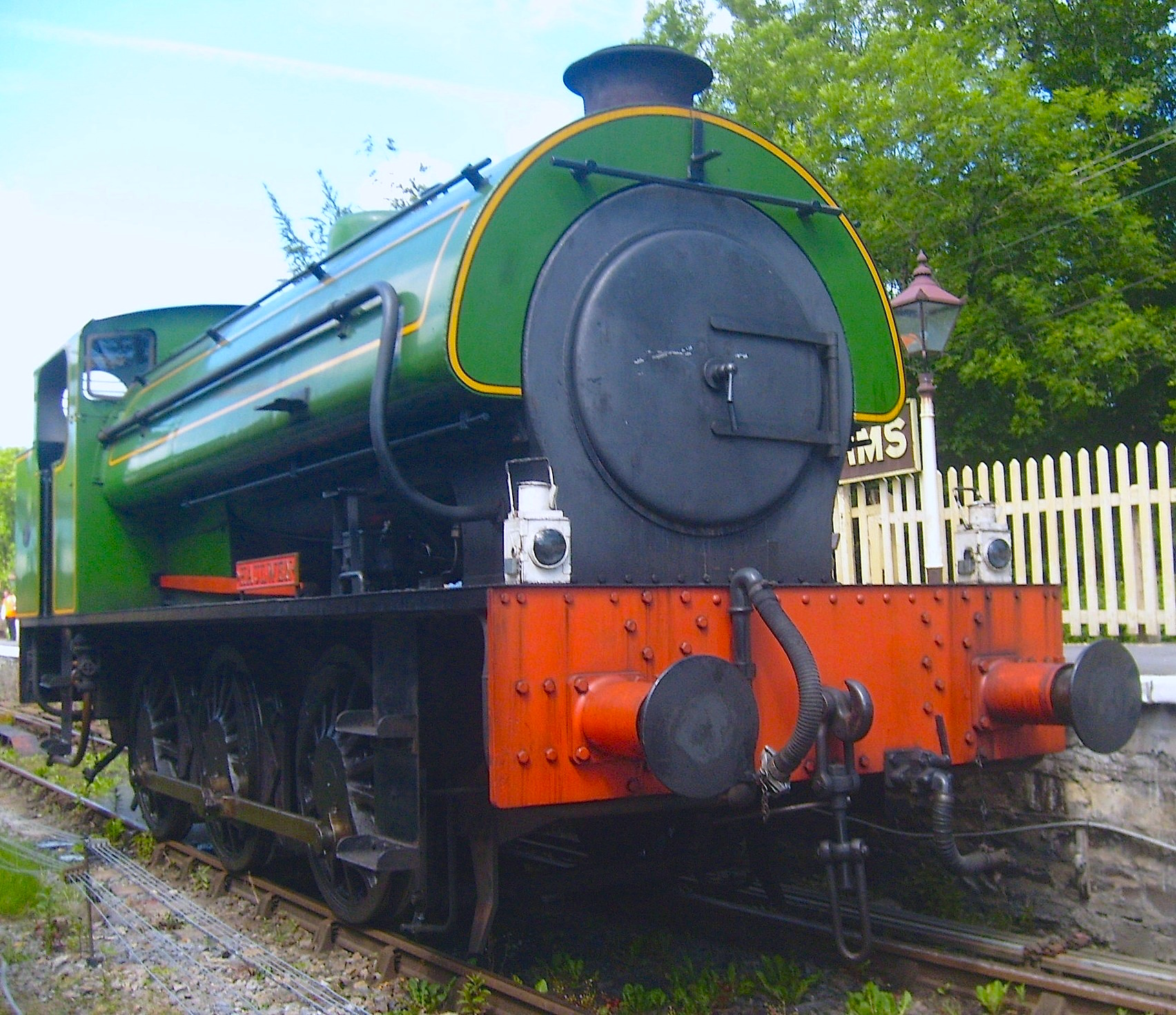
- The official logo of the Gwili Railway Vulcan Foundry Austerity 0-6-0ST 'Haulwen' at Bronwydd Arms
- Locale: Wales
- Terminus: Danycoed Halt; Abergwili Junction
- Coordinates: 51.89155°N 4.30077°W

Commercial operations
- Name: Carmarthen and Cardigan Railway
- Original gauge: 7 ft 1/4 in (2,140 mm) Brunel gauge

Preserved operations
- Operated by: Gwili Railway Co. Ltd
- Stations: 4
- Length: 4.50 miles (7.24 km)
- Preserved gauge: 4 ft 8 1/2 in (1,435 mm) standard gauge

Commercial history
- Opened: 1860
- 1872: Converted to 4 ft 8 1/2 in (1,435 mm) standard gauge
- 1881: Absorbed by Great Western Railway
- 1973: Closed

Preservation history
- 1978: One mile opened by the preservation society
- 1987: Llwyfan Cerrig reached
- 1988: Llwyfan Cerrig station officially opened
- 2001: Opening of extension to Danycoed
- 2002: Work starts on extension to Abergwili Junction
- 2008: Gwili Railway marks 30 years to the day of Re-opening
- 2009: Gwili Railway purchases Llanpumpsaint train station site (completely).
- 2011: Gwili is Awarded for fully restored GWR-Style crossing gates at Bronwydd Arms itself.
- 2017: Opening of extension to new station at Abergwili Junction.
- 2023: Abergwili Junction officially opened.
- Headquarters: Bronwydd Arms

The Gwili Railway (Welsh: Rheilffordd Gwili) is a Welsh heritage railway, that operates a preserved standard gauge railway line from the site of Abergwili Junction (near Carmarthen) in southwest Wales along a four-and-a-half-mile (7.2 km) section of the former Carmarthen to Aberystwyth line. The original railway closed in 1965, with the track being lifted in 1975.

== Original line ==
The broad-gauge railway was opened in 1860 from Carmarthen to Conwil (now Cynwyl) by the ill-fated Carmarthen and Cardigan Railway Company (CCR), which fell in and out of insolvency until it was eventually absorbed by the Great Western Railway. Despite hostility from GWR, the line never actually reached Cardigan – getting no further than Newcastle Emlyn.

The Manchester and Milford Railway made a junction with the CCR at Pencader, making a through route to Lampeter which, in turn, later extended to Aberystwyth. In 1872, the line became the last in Wales to be converted from Brunel's 7 ft 1/4 in (2,140 mm) gauge to 4 ft 8 1/2 in (1,435 mm) standard gauge.

In its early days, the line thrived by serving the local farming and wool industries though, in the years following the First World War, this traffic gradually declined. The GWR sought to encourage traffic, opened several new halts along the route and provided camping coaches at several stations. The Second World War brought another lease of life as a relief route carrying heavy ammunition trains between south and north Wales.

The route earned a reputation as a meandering rural branch; where trains trundled along, often flagged down by market-bound farmers' wives making their way across the fields to board the carriages. In fact, nearly three hours was permitted for the 56-mile (90 km) journey between Carmarthen and Aberystwyth.

In the post-war years declining traffic lead to the passenger closure of the branches to Aberaeron and Newcastle Emlyn which closed in 1952 which left only the route between Carmarthen and Aberystwyth open to traffic. The line enjoyed a brief resurgence in the 1950s, when the Royal Train traversed the route and other new traffic included Butlins through-specials taking holidaymakers to the new camp in Pwllheli.

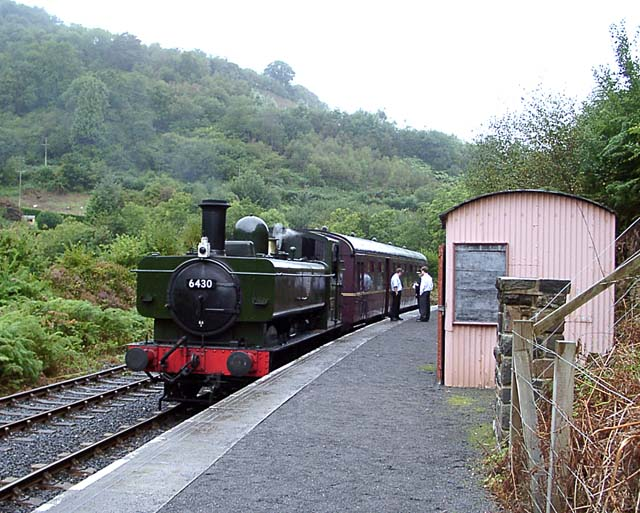
6430 ( On loan from Llangollen ) at Danycoed

However, declining passenger figures meant that the Beeching Axe was inevitable. In the end however, it was nature that struck the first blow. Heavy flooding severed the line six miles (9.7 km) from Aberystwyth in December 1964, this taking place in the same weekend that storms that caused the Ruabon to Barmouth Line to suffer a similar washout. The last passenger train ran along the truncated route on 22 February 1965, two Hymek diesels providing the motive power. The line remained open for freight using Hymek locomotives until around 1970, then by Class 37 locomotives. The freight traffic that kept the remainder of the line open was dominated mainly by milk traffic between Carmarthen and Lampeter where traffic was routed to both the last remaining part of the main line to Aberystwyth as far as the milk creamery at Pont Llanio (near Llanddewi-Brefi which survived until 1970, plus the Aberaeron branch as far as the milk creamery at Green Grove near Felin Fach which continued in service until discontinued by British Rail in 1973.

This resulted in the final closure of the line. Track was left in place until the summer of 1975.

== Gwili Railway Preservation Company ==
Following the line's closure, the Gwili Railway Preservation Company was formed with the ambition to preserve at least 8 miles (13 km) of track of the former route, from Abergwili Junction right up the Gwili Valley to the station site at Llanpumpsaint.

Track lifting had already started at the time of the formation of the new company in 1975 and, as a result, only one mile (1.6 km) of track north of Bronwydd Arms was left in situ. Within three years the company were able to acquire the full 8-mile stretch of trackbed from Abergwili Junction to Llanpumsaint for both rebuilding and preserving.

In April 1978, it re-opened the one-mile section from its base at Bronwydd Arms, (3 miles (4.8 km) north of Carmarthen), making it the first standard-gauge heritage railway to operate in Wales. Over time, the Railway has extended the operational length from one-mile to over 4 1/2 miles (7 km), as well as reconstructing original features at Bronwydd Arms station and amassing a collection of locomotives and rolling stock.

The railway had been working south towards Carmarthen to a new station site named "Abergwili Junction" built on the northern outskirts of Carmarthen, at the site of the old and former Abergwili junction.

=== Route ===
Trains on the Gwili start from Abergwili Junction on a site that is being constantly improved that has 2 platforms, carriage shed, large car park, cafe and a booking office.

The next stop is Bronwydd Arms where the replica GWR station is dominated by a signal box saved from Llandybie railway station on the Heart of Wales Line. The signal box, which is open to the public, was built in 1885 and has been restored to operate signalling within the station area.

Typical features on the line include the gradients such as the 1 in 60 on the bank immediately north of Bronwydd Arms, the meandering River Gwili and the A484 road which are never far away and the wooded forests and sharp curves as the railway twists its way through the valley.

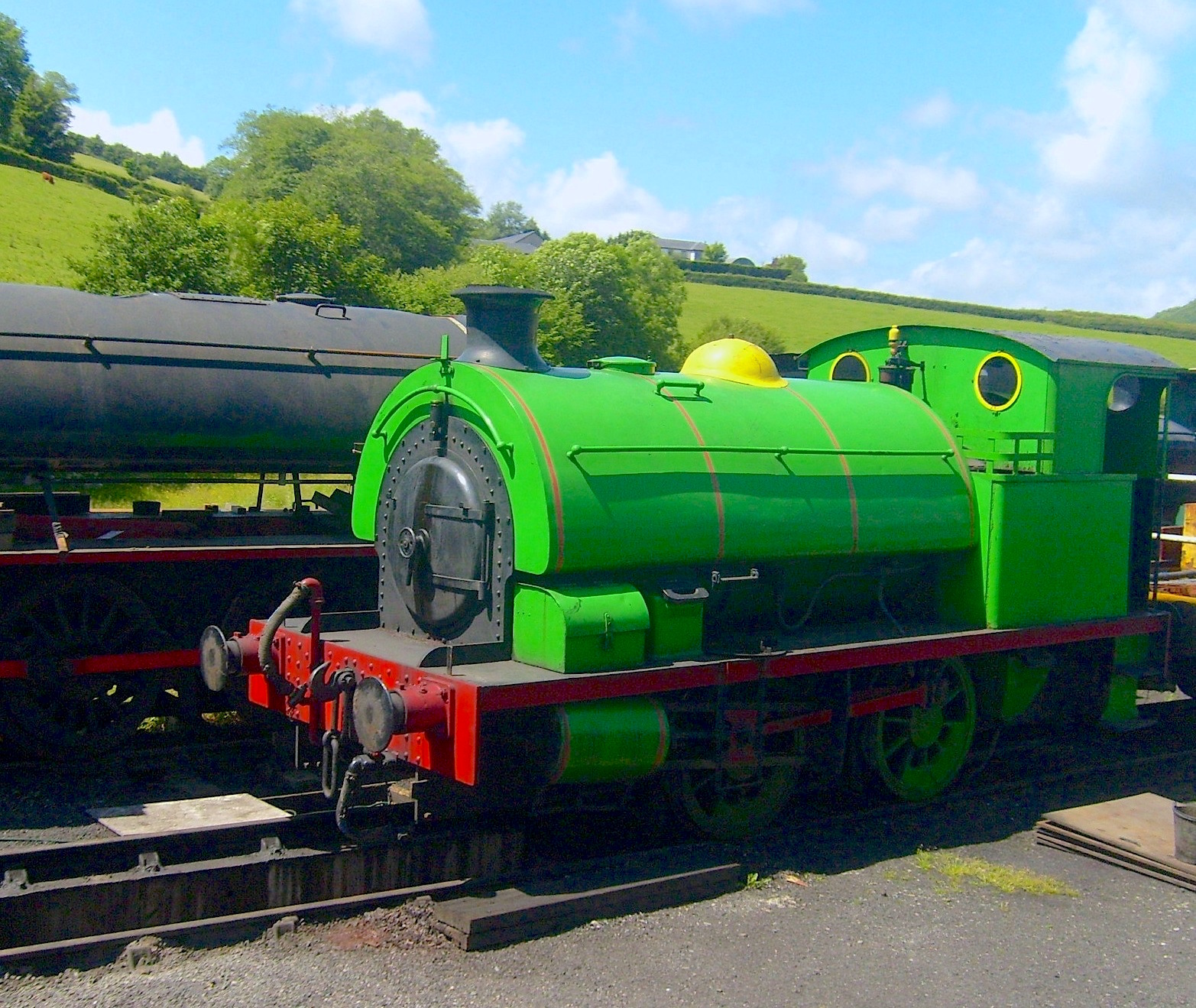
Peckett 0-4-0ST 'Olwen' at Bronwydd Arms

From Bronwydd, the line climbs between rural hills and meadows alongside the River Gwili past the site of the first terminus of the newly opened Gwili Railway next to the old mill at Cwmdwyfran. From here, the line continues climbing until it passes under a rusticated brick bridge at the second terminus at the now defunct Penybont station.

The line carries over a redecked bridge crossing the River Gwili. This expansion was achieved in time for its 10th anniversary celebrations in 1988. At the same time, the new terminus of Llwyfan Cerrig was opened to the public.

In 2001, a further one-half mile (0.8 km) extension built by volunteer labour was opened to a new halt at Danycoed.

Llwyfan Cerrig (English: Stone Platform) was a former quarrymen's halt and the Gwili Railway has created a nature trail which winds through the old quarry and emerges above the stock sheds. The station building, which originally stood at Felin Fach on the Aberaeron branch and dates from 1911, was dismantled by volunteers and re-erected in the early 1990s. It has been restored and furnished to an authentic 1950s style.

From the platform, a path leads to a picnic area on the bank of the Gwili River where kingfishers and heron can sometimes be glimpsed. A miniature railway runs from this station and refreshments can be bought.

From Llwyfan Cerrig, the line runs uphill for another one-quarter mile (0.40 km) with the River Gwili on one side and a rock face on the other, until it reaches the present end of the line at Danycoed (English translation being 'under the wood') where a typical GWR rural halt has been recreated.

Operationally, the railway is normally run on a 'one engine in steam' basis.

=== Incident ===
On 19 July 2006, a volunteer train guard was killed in an accident after being trapped between two carriages as they were being coupled together for the train that was due to run that day.

== Future expansion ==
=== Northwards ===
Restoring the line northwards has proven to be more difficult than the Gwili Railway had initially anticipated, volunteers' high hopes of reaching either Cynwyl Elfed or Llanpumsaint having been hindered by the cost of repairing a number of bridges en route. There are a total of nine bridges between Danycoed Halt and Llanpumsaint, all of which are in poor condition and require extensive refurbishment to be made safe for rail traffic once more. Eight of the bridges cross the River Gwili, whilst the ninth crosses a road immediately south of the site of Llanpumpsaint railway station.

An attempt was made in the early to mid 1990s to extend the railway by laying track southwards from the disused Conwil station site towards the railhead at Llwyfan Cerrig, but was frustrated by the escalating cost of repairing the three river bridges en route.

Beyond Llanpumsaint, the track-bed is virtually intact through the tunnel and up to just south of the site of Pencader station; however, the Gwili Railway has no plans to extend further in that direction as it neither owns the land nor has the necessary statutory powers to operate a railway north of Llanpumsaint, due to donations of track they have more than enough to extend to Conwil.

=== Southwards ===
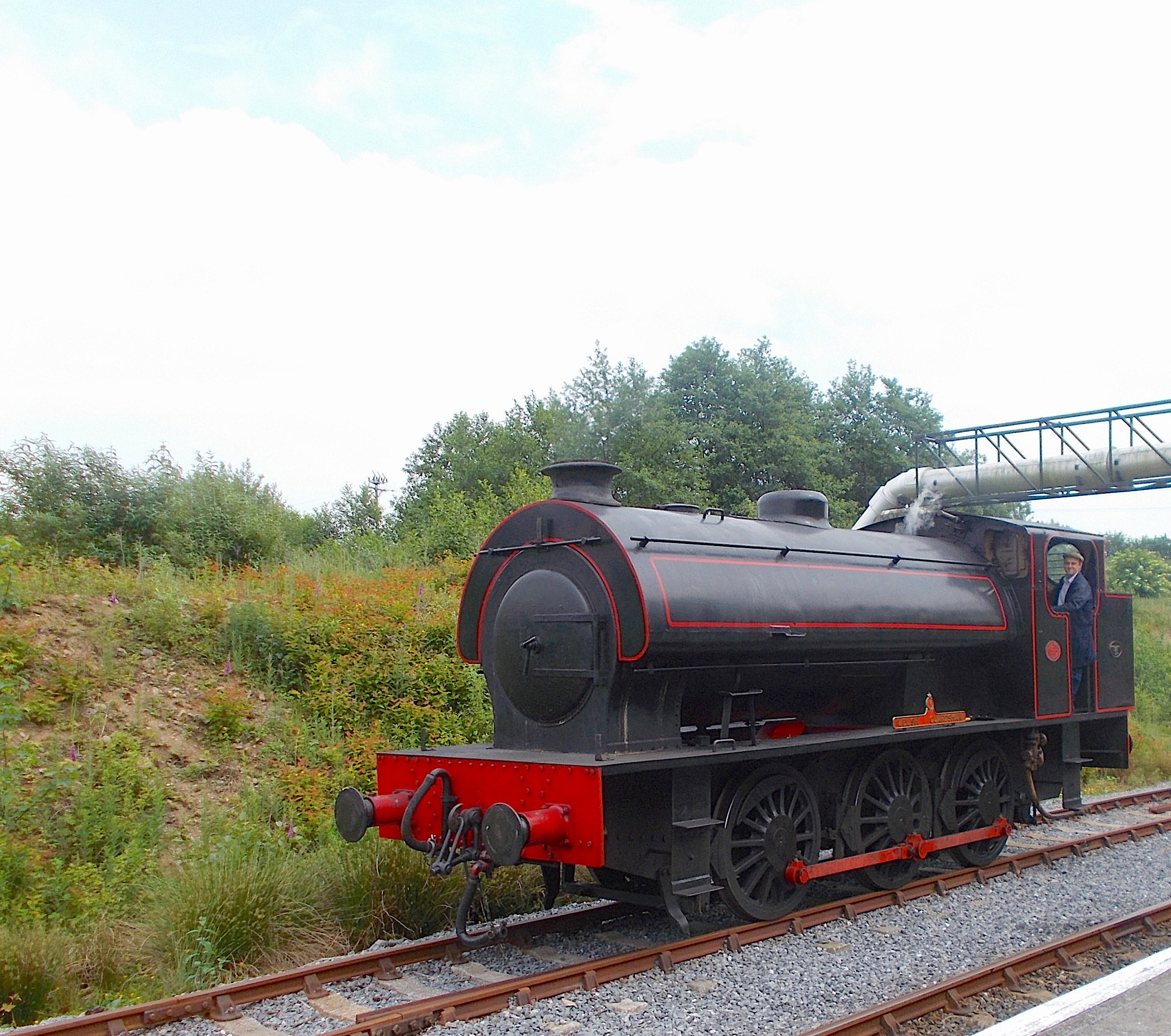
RSH Austerity 0-6-0ST 'Welsh Guardsman' runs round at Abergwili Junction

The closure of the former Swansea Vale Railway in 2007 resulted in a merger of that society with the Gwili. This has provided a boost to the southern extension (to Abergwili) with track materials, a footbridge, water tanks/cranes and signalling equipment from Swansea now earmarked for use on the Abergwili extension.

In 2011, over one mile (1.6 km) of track was laid on the southern extension to Abergwili Junction and work started to improve signalling and the level crossing at Bronwydd Arms for future passenger operation.

By 2016, the track had extended all the way down and into Abergwili Junction station itself. The extension of the railway to Abergwili Junction finally opened in July 2017, this brings the line up to a total of 4 1/2 miles (7.2 km) in length. On 1 July the extension opened for 150 invited guests, with the extension opening to the public the day after, on 2 July.

Abergwili Junction is the permanent southern terminus of the Gwili Railway. The Carmarthen East by-pass (constructed 1997 -1999) followed the course of the old line from Carmarthen to Llandeilo, rendering any extension of the line south beyond Abergwili Junction impossible. Abergwili Junction station has one platform, with a run-round loop. However the Aberystwyth-Carmarthen Feasibility study states there is sufficient land alongside the west side of the bypass to reconnect the 2 km to Carmarthen station though it would require a new 100m skew bridge across the Afon Tywi just north of Carmarthen station.

== Locomotives ==
Name and Number	Class	Builder	Picture	Livery	Notes
3879 Haulwen	Hunslet Austerity	Built by the Vulcan Foundry 1945, Rebuilt in 1961 by Hunslet		N/A	Returned from overhaul recently, Haulwen is back operational on the line.
7849 Moorbarrow	Robert Stephenson and Hawthorns 0-6-0ST	Built by Robert Stephenson and Hawthorns in 1955		Lined Blue	Moved to the line in 2015, returned to service following an overhaul in July 2021
5521 (L.150)	GWR 4575 Class 2-6-2T	Built by GWR Swindon Works in 1927.		N/A	Moved to the line in 2025.

- 3879 Vulcan Foundry-built Austerity 0-6-0ST locomotive built in 1945 (works number 5272). Rebuilt in 1961 by Hunslet Ltd (works number 3879). Withdrawn from operational services in early 2016, and now undergoing an overhaul. Named HAULWEN.
- 7849 Robert Stephenson and Hawthorns 0-6-0ST built in 1955. Named No.47 Moorbarrow and outshopped in a light blue livery, operational following completion of overhaul in July 2021.

=== Former steam locomotives ===
- 71516 War Department 0-6-0ST built in 1944 by Robert Stevenson Hawthorns (works number 7170) Named WELSH GUARDSMAN. Returned to service in 2013 following overhaul. Left for the Severn Valley Railway in February 2020.
- GWR 7800 Class 7820 Dinmore Manor was rescued from Woodham Brothers, Barry for restoration in 1979, but this proved to be beyond the financial resources of the railway so was sold in 1983.
- GWR 6400 Class 6430 is visiting until January 2024.

Name and Number	Class	Builder	Picture	Livery	Notes
7058 Olwen	0-4-0ST	Built by Robert Stephenson and Hawthorns in 1942		Painted as Percy	Used as Percy at Thomas events. Olwen left the railway in late November 2023
