= Carmarthen and Cardigan Railway =

Railway line in Wales

The Carmarthen and Cardigan Railway was a 7 ft 1/4 in (2,140 mm) broad gauge railway line in Wales that was intended to connect Carmarthen on the South Wales Railway with Cardigan. In fact, it was unable to raise the necessary capital and was loss-making from the time of opening the first short section of its line in 1860, and it was in receivership for much of its life. It eventually reached Llandysul in 1864 but was not extended further during its independent existence.

Its station at Carmarthen became the focus of several independent cross-country railways which made junctions with it, and for a time the toll charges for the short distances used by their trains was useful income, but the line never became solvent and it sold its concern to the Great Western Railway in 1882. The GWR eventually extended from Llandyssil to Newcastle Emlyn, which improved the use of the line somewhat. Meanwhile, another railway was built to Cardigan from Whitland, and the C&CR line did not extend beyond Newcastle Emlyn.

Passenger trains ceased operating on the Newcastle Emlyn branch in 1952 and on the rest of the line in 1965 apart from access to the creamery north of Pencader until 1973. The exception is the short stub into Carmarthen town that diverges from the through-line from Swansea and is used by all passenger trains serving Carmarthen.

== South Wales Railway ==
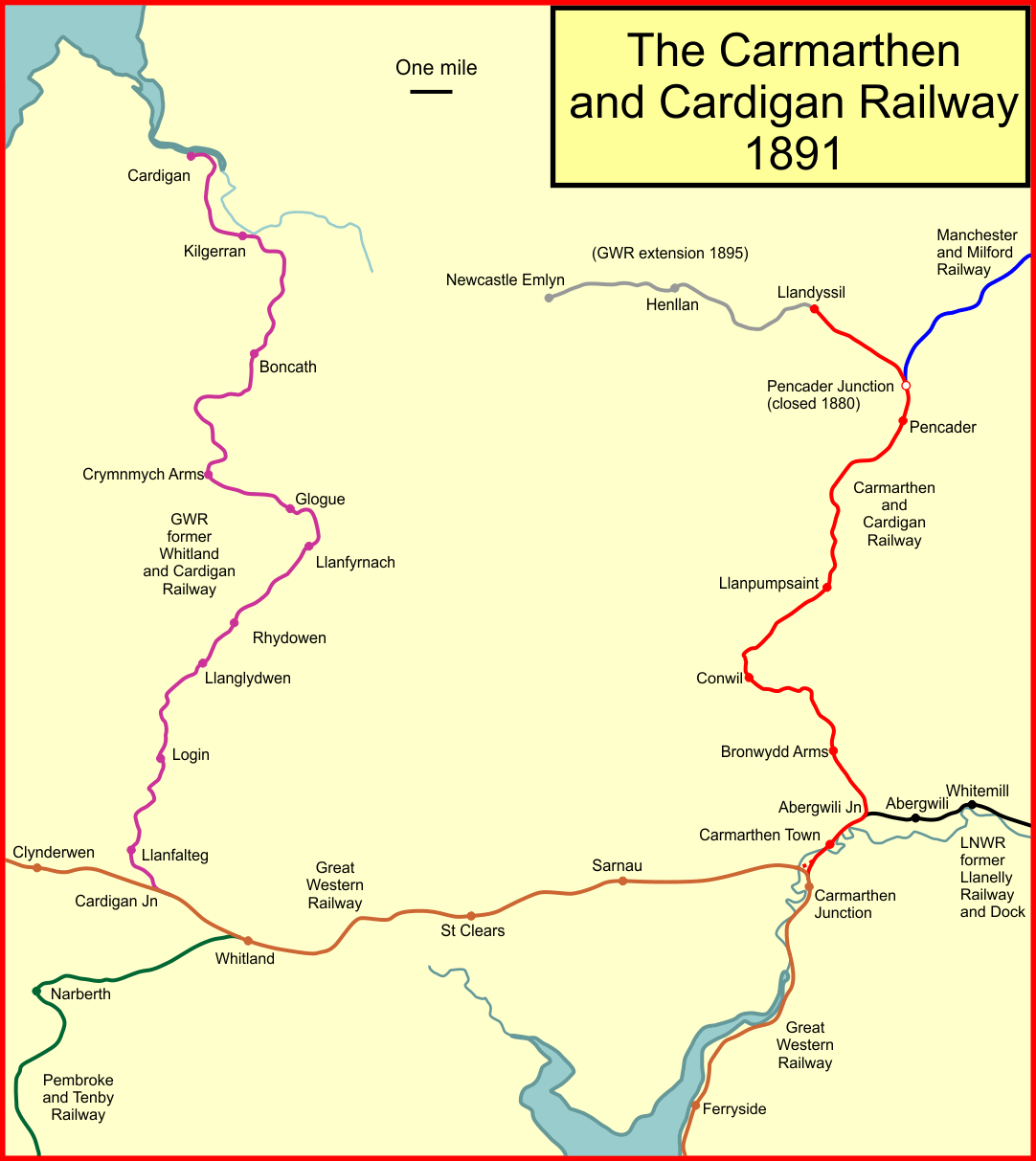
System map of the Carmarthen and Cardigan Railway

The Great Western Railway opened its line between London and Bristol in 1841. A branch to Gloucester and Cheltenham was built by the Cheltenham and Great Western Union Railway. The GWR encouraged the formation of what was to become the South Wales Railway to build a line from near Gloucester through Cardiff and Swansea to Fishguard. The South Wales Railway Act 1845 (8 & 9 Vict. c. cxc) obtained royal assent on 4 August 1845. The line opened progressively: from Swansea (Landore) to Carmarthen on 11 October 1852 and to Haverfordwest and Neyland on 2 January 1854. Radically changed economic conditions put reaching Fishguard in abeyance.

The position of the town of Carmarthen on the River Towy and the hills to the west of the town made the design of a through railway difficult, and the decision was taken to pass south of Carmarthen. The SWR built a station adjacent to the Pensarn to Cwmffryd road (now A484). In common with the Great Western Railway, the South Wales Railway was a broad gauge line.

The South Wales Railway later merged with the Great Western Railway and became for all practical purposes part of the Great Western on 1 January 1862.

== Bold ideas ==
Connection to a railway hugely improved the economic prosperity of a town, enabling goods to be brought in and out cheaply. The terrain north and west of Carmarthen was in need of a railway connection and the Carmarthen and Cardigan Railway was planned. The first promoters of the Carmarthen and Cardigan Railway planned to build a line from Carmarthen to Cardigan, and build a new deep-water port there, opening up shipping routes from west Wales. In 1853 this scheme was widened to include a line to Kidwelly and Cross Hands, connecting the mining and quarrying on Mynydd Mawr. Late in that year, it became plain that these ambitions were beyond the expected financial resources of the company, and a more modest scheme, to build from Carmarthen to Newcastle Emlyn, was formulated.

== Authorisation ==
Carmarthen and Cardigan Railway Act 1854
- Act of Parliament
- Parliament of the United Kingdom
- Long title: An Act for making a Railway from the South Wales Railway at or near the Borough of Carmarthen to the Town of Newcastle Emlyn, with a view of being hereafter extended to the Town and Harbour of Cardigan; and for other Purposes.
- Citation: 17 & 18 Vict. c. ccxviii

Dates
- Royal assent: 7 August 1854

Text of statute as originally enacted

Accordingly, a bill for the Carmarthen and Cardigan Railway went to Parliament, but proposing a line only as far as Newcastle Emlyn, a distance of 26 miles, at this stage. The Carmarthen and Cardigan Railway Act 1854 (17 & 18 Vict. c. ccxviii) obtained royal assent on 1 July 1854, with share capital of £300,000. The company was to build its own "Carmarthen" station closer to the town than the SWR station, and a bridge was needed to cross the River Towy. The line was to be to the broad gauge, consistent with the gauge of the South Wales Railway.

The act permitted the raising of capital, but actually securing commitment to investing proved difficult; an extension of time was authorised during 1856 but it was not until March 1857 that enough money had been raised to start work. The engineer was Joseph Cubitt.

In 1859, the company considered altering its track gauge from broad gauge to standard gauge (at the time referred to as narrow-gauge), to reduce costs. This was opposed by the South Wales Railway, which feared that it would encourage a connection with a rival with standard gauge lines. A bill authorising this was passed in the House of Commons but the C&CR withdrew the proposal on receiving certain working undertakings from the SWR, and continued construction in the authorised broad gauge.

== First openings ==
The short distance from the junction with the SWR (Myrtle Hill Junction) to the C&CR Carmarthen station was opened on 1 March 1860; the South Wales Railway station was renamed Carmarthen Junction on the same day. It had been intended to open on 1 November 1859 but the mode of the junction was objected to by the SWR engineer. This was followed by opening of the line as far as Conwil on 3 September 1860; there was an intermediate station at Bronwydd Arms. The C&CR relied on the SWR to work its line, and friction developed when the C&CR claimed that the charges for this were excessive. Whatever the truth of that, the C&CR was not earning enough to pay the working expenses and the service was suspended after only four months' operation, on 31 December 1860. There were outstanding debts to the SWR which the C&CR was unable to pay, and the SWR seized £1,343 worth of rails and sold them.

The C&CR now determined to work the line itself, and hired two 4-4-0 tank engines; it reopened its line on 12 August 1861. (Note: The Disused Stations history gives 15 August 1861.)

Carmarthen and Cardigan Railway Act 1862
- Act of Parliament
- Parliament of the United Kingdom
- Long title: An Act to enable the Carmarthen and Cardigan Railway Company to extend their Railway from Llangeller to Newcastle-Emlyn, and to raise further Monies.
- Citation: 25 & 26 Vict. c. clxxii

Dates
- Royal assent: 29 July 1862

Text of statute as originally enacted

Carmarthen and Cardigan Railway Act 1863
- Act of Parliament
- Parliament of the United Kingdom
- Long title: An Act to enable the Carmarthen and Cardigan Railway Company to extend their Railway from Newcastle-Emlyn to Cardigan.
- Citation: 26 & 27 Vict. c. clxvi

Dates
- Royal assent: 1 July 1863

Text of statute as originally enacted

Construction further northwards was difficult; Pencader tunnel was especially troublesome. Work had started in the Spring of 1857, but in the Autumn of 1861 the contractor abandoned the workings, and a substitute contractor had to be found. The company obtained parliamentary authorisation for a revival of the powers to build to Newcastle Emlyn on 29 July 1862 and for an extension to Cardigan, by the Carmarthen and Cardigan Railway Act 1863 (26 & 27 Vict. c. clxvi) of 1 July 1863. The company was hopelessly insolvent and never managed to construct either of these sections in its own right.

The line was opened as far as Pencader on 12 October 1863, but difficulty with the passenger authorisation was hinted at:

Carmarthen and Cardigan Railway: A further portion of this Company's line was opened for mineral traffic to Pencader on the 12th instant [12 October 1864], and obtaining the permission of the Board of Trade the Directors will open the line for passenger traffic up to that point. Considerable progress has been made with the works on the section between Pencader and Llandissil [sic], and it appears that every effort is being made by Mr. Holden, the contractor, to complete the line for traffic up to the latter place as soon as possible.

— Birmingham Daily Post, 29 October 1863

Evidently "obtaining the permission of the Board of Trade" proved difficult, and the line from Conwil to Pencader was opened to passenger traffic on 28 March 1864, with an intermediate station at Llanpumpsaint. MacDermot says that this opening "was made in defiance of the Board of Trade, who ordered a postponement, but do not appear to have taken any effective steps to enforce their order". (Note: It seems not to be possible to confirm MacDermot's remarkable assertion.)

The line was opened onwards to Llandyssil on 3 June 1864. There were four trains each way daily, generally to and from the South Wales Railway station at Carmarthen Junction.

== Ambitious plans but financial difficulties ==
Carmarthen and Cardigan Railway (Kidwelly Branch) Act 1864
- Act of Parliament
- Parliament of the United Kingdom
- Long title: An Act to enable the Carmarthen and Cardigan Railway Company to make a Branch Railway near Kidwelly in Carmarthenshire.
- Citation: 27 & 28 Vict. c. xiii

Dates
- Royal assent: 28 April 1864

Carmarthen and Cardigan Railway (Separation of Capital, &c.) Act 1865
- Act of Parliament
- Parliament of the United Kingdom
- Long title: An Act to authorize the Carmarthen and Cardigan Railway Company to form into separate Capitals the Capitals authorized to be raised by the Carmarthen and Cardigan Railway Acts, 1862 and 1863; and to extend the Times granted by the said Acts for the Purchase of Lands and Execution of Works.
- Citation: 28 & 29 Vict. c. xxxvii

Dates
- Royal assent: 26 May 1865

Carmarthen and Cardigan Railway (Kidwelly Extension) Act 1865
- Act of Parliament
- Parliament of the United Kingdom
- Long title: An Act to authorize the Carmarthen and Cardigan Railway Company to extend their Railway near Kidwelly in Carmarthenshire.
- Citation: 28 & 29 Vict. c. clxx

Dates
- Royal assent: 29 June 1865

Text of statute as originally enacted

Undeterred by its financial situation the company now obtained an act of Parliament, Carmarthen and Cardigan Railway (Kidwelly Branch) Act 1864 (27 & 28 Vict. c. xiii), allowing it to build from Kidwelly to Velindre; and another act of Parliament, the Carmarthen and Cardigan Railway (Kidwelly Extension) Act 1865 (28 & 29 Vict. c. clxx), from Kidwelly to Pontyberem in 1865; accessed in the Gwendraeth Fach and Gwendraeth Fawr valleys respectively. There were considerable mineral deposits at these locations, chiefly limestone in the former case. The finances of the C&CR were so confused that it was found impossible to proceed, and a shareholders' meeting was held on 11 July 1866 to agree to the separation of the scheme from the C&CR. A bill was prepared:

... for authorizing the construction of the Carmarthen and Cardigan (Kidwelly branch) as a separate undertaking, and for that purpose to raise 100,000l [£100,000] of capital... It also appears that 70,000l was [already] authorized to be raised by the Carmarthen and Cardiganshire [sic] Company's Kidwelly Branch Act of 1865, but the affairs of the Carmarthen and Cardigan Railway being so involved, it was found impossible to construct the Kidwelly branch unless entirely separated from the general undertaking.

— The Times, 11 July 1866

Financial mismanagement was clearly to blame:

Carmarthen and Cardigan Railway: A few days ago reference was made to the financial position of this company. From what has since transpired, it appears that of the £970,000 capital represented to have been expended, £200,000 has been issued in Lloyd's bonds, for which no value has been received, and a promise has been made to return them; and if this promise is carried out, the capital will be reduced to £770,000. The railway is now virtually in the hands of the Court of Chancery, but there is every probability that the undertaking will ultimately be either leased or sold to the Manchester and Milford Railway Company.

— Western Daily Press, 11 September 1865

The shareholders agreed with the separation of the Gwendraeth branches, and a separate company, the Gwendreath Valleys Railway, was incorporated on 20 June 1866, to build the line to Mynydd-y-Garreg in the Gwendraeth Fach, and the Burry Port and Gwendraeth Valley Railway was formed from an amalgamation of the Kidwelly and Burry Port Railway and the Burry Port company, also adopting the powers for the Gwendraeth Fawr line on 30 April 1866.

Declining to take on new liabilities was all very well, but it did not improve the trading losses and existing indebtedness. Interest payments on bank loans of three-quarters of a million pounds could not be sustained, and the company went into receivership in November 1864, continuing to trade under administration.

== Llanelly Railway and Dock Company ==
The Llanelly Railway and Dock Company had built a line from Llanelly towards the Amman Valley and later extended it to Llandeilo. In 1864 it opened a line from Llandeilo to Carmarthen, actually making a junction with the Carmarthen and Cardigan Railway at Abergwili Junction, about a mile north of Carmarthen. The Llanelly line was narrow gauge (later referred to as standard gauge) and by arrangement in the Llanelly Railway and Dock Act 1862 (25 & 26 Vict. c. clxi) laid additional rails from Abergwili Junction to Carmarthen C&CR station to enable their trains to run. Llanelly goods trains started running on this section on 13 November 1864 and passenger trains from 1 June 1865. Through a series of political machinations, the Carmarthen section of the Llanelly Railway and Dock company eventually became part of the London and North Western Railway in 1891.

== Manchester and Milford Railway ==
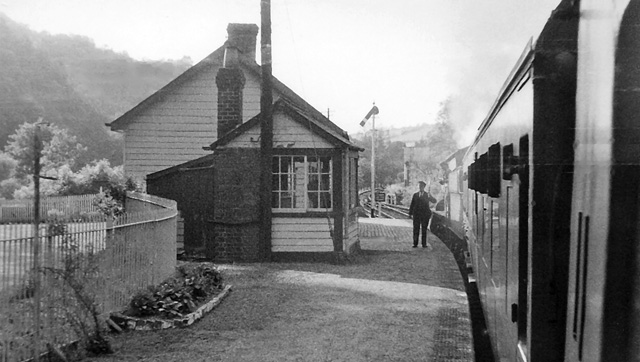
Conwil railway station (1962)

In 1860 the Manchester and Milford Railway Act 1860 (23 & 24 Vict. c. clxxv) received royal assent. It authorised the building of a line from Pencader to Llanidloes. The following year a branch to Aberystwyth was proposed; these lines were to join the Carmarthen and Cardigan Railway at Pencader. However the Manchester and Milford Railway was a narrow (standard) gauge line, so through-running at Pencader would not be possible. In fact, the M&MR was riven by indecision and lack of money, and it had to seek an amending act of Parliament for a time extension, which it achieved with the Manchester and Milford Railway Act 1865 (28 & 29 Vict. c. cccv). By then Parliament considered the broad gauge to be a "general irritant" and the Carmarthen and Cardigan Railway was to be obliged to lay a third rail (to enable narrow gauge trains to run) between Pencader Junction and Carmarthen, and to grant running powers to the M&MR. Failing compliance the M&MR would be entitled to lay the additional rails itself. Seeing this as an unfriendly incursion, the C&CR applied for running powers over the M&MR to Aberystwyth, but this was turned down by Parliament.

The M&MR line from Pencader to Lampeter was opened on 1 January 1866 but the mixed gauge rails had not been laid; accordingly, Davies and Beeston, the M&MR's contractor, were instructed to lay the necessary rails; they received £20,000 of M&MR shares for their trouble. While the work was proceeding there was an exchange station called Pencader Junction, a short distance north of Pencader C&CR station. The M&MR opened its line from Lampeter to Strata Florida on 1 September 1866, and on to Aberystwyth on 12 August 1867.

The mixed gauge track between Pencader Junction and Carmarthen was "ready" in August 1866 and M&MR goods trains started running through from 1 November 1866. Passenger train operation was delayed because of the difficulty in obtaining Board of Trade approval for passenger operation, which was not received until February 1868. (Note: Some sources state that passenger trains of the M&MR started running through on 1 November 1867 but Holden is adamant that this is erroneous.) In the meantime, southbound mixed (goods and passenger) M&MR trains detached their passenger coaches at Pencader and re-attached them on the northbound journey., In any case, the M&MR passenger trains ceased running south of Pencader in 1872.

== Pembroke and Tenby Railway ==
The line between Pembroke and Tenby had opened in 1863, and in 1866, extended to Whitland on the South Wales Railway main line. The P&TR was a narrow (standard) gauge railway. The company had ambitious intentions of linking with the Manchester and Milford Railway, thus forming a through railway from the manufacturing districts of Lancashire to its own harbour at Pembroke Dock. This would require a narrow gauge connection between Whitland and Carmarthen. The GWR main line was still broad gauge at this time and the GWR did not welcome the competition; after a strained period of negotiation, the GWR converted one track of its line between Whitland and Carmarthen to accommodate the P&TR trains. The P&TR built a west-to-north curve at Carmarthen, known as the P&T Loop, enabling direct running into the C&CR station. Goods traffic on the route started in June 1868, and passenger traffic started in August 1869.

This arrangement was not the great advance the P&TR had hoped for, as the through traffic from the M&MR, itself in poor financial health, was not great, although the Llanelly Dock and Railway contributed more, having a better northward connection via Llandeilo. The C&CR demanded a toll payment equivalent to four miles running for the P&TR trains which only used 48 chains of C&CR track, adding to the difficulties faced by the P&TR.

== Out of receivership ==
The C&CR was released from receivership in 1867, aided by the income from toll charges received from the vesting railways.

== Gauge conversion ==
The GWR converted the gauge of the South Wales Railway line to standard gauge on 12 May 1872. The C&CR was obliged to convert its remaining broad gauge section, the three miles from Pencader to Llandyssil, as well. This was completed on 1 June 1872 at which time broad-gauge operation elsewhere in Wales had already ceased: the C&CR ran the last broad gauge trains in Wales.

== Sale to the Great Western Railway ==
In September 1869 a new company was formed, encouraged by the C&CR, to extend the line to Newcastle Emlyn and later to continue to Cardigan, but once again inadequate finance was forthcoming. In desperation the C&CR made an approach to the London and North Western Railway, inviting them to acquire the C&CR and build the extension to Newcastle Emlyn, but the LNWR saw this as a remote and unprofitable outpost and declined.

Carmarthen and Cardigan Railway Act 1881
- Act of Parliament
- Parliament of the United Kingdom
- Long title: An Act to authorise the Carmarthen and Cardigan Railway Company to sell their undertaking to the Great Western Railway Company, and for extending the Carmarthen and Cardigan Railway to Newcastle Emlyn; and for other purposes.
- Citation: 44 & 45 Vict. c. ccxi

Dates
- Royal assent: 22 August 1881

Text of statute as originally enacted

In 1881 the C&CR line was leased to the GWR, and on 1 July 1882 the C&CR was absorbed by the GWR under the Carmarthen and Cardigan Railway Act 1881 (44 & 45 Vict. c. ccxi).

== An alternative route to Cardigan ==
The Carmarthen and Cardigan Railway had long given up any hope of reaching Cardigan, and after acquisition by the Great Western Railway the GWR too was unwilling to complete the connection. In 1869 the Whitland and Taf Vale Railway obtained the Whitland and Taf Vale Railway Act 1869 (32 & 33 Vict. c. xci) giving authorisation to build a branch line from Whitland to quarries around Glogue; it opened as far as Glogue in 1873, but soon saw the advantage in extending to Cardigan. Changing its name to the Whitland and Cardigan Railway it completed the line in 1886, at which time the GWR worked the trains. The GWR absorbed it in 1890, so that Cardigan was reached by GWR branch line from Whitland instead of from Carmarthen.

== Under the Great Western Railway ==
With a GWR branch line to Cardigan built, there was now no point in considering extending the C&CR route that far; the GWR committed itself to build the extension of the former C&CR line on to Newcastle Emlyn, but even this was a low priority for the company, and it was not until 1 July 1895 that the extension line was opened. The GWR established an omnibus service from Newcastle Emlyn to Cardigan.

The Manchester and Milford Railway was leased by the Great Western Railway in 1906 and absorbed by it in 1911. The Carmarthen to Aberystwyth line then became the main line, and the Newcastle Emlyn line operated as its branch.

== Carmarthen stations ==
The GWR main line trains called at Carmarthen Junction station and connections were available there to the former C&CR station. In 1895 there were 14 GWR trains each way between the Junction and the Town station. (Note: The C&CR station is often referred to as the "Town" station for convenience, but it was always officially known simply as "Carmarthen".) The C&CR station was closer to the town but was neither well constructed nor convenient, and the GWR took the opportunity to build a better station a short distance to the south, opening it on 1 July 1902. The old P&TR loop had been reduced to sidings status when P&TR trains stopped running through to Carmarthen, and it was now reopened as a running line. Through GWR trains on the main line now made a station call at the improved Town station, reversing there to continue their journey. The Junction station closed on 30 September 1926. (Note: According to Barrie; Quick gives 27 September 1926; the authoritative anonymous writer in the Railway Magazine of 1961 gives 27 September 1928.)

The Town station was greatly extended and enhanced in 1930 - 1931, and the River Towy bridge, dating from 1858 was reconstructed. The new bridge was constructed alongside the old bridge, and consequently, considerable permanent way alterations at each end were necessary. The opportunity was taken to remodel and improve the facilities at Carmarthen station; increased passenger and milk platform accommodation was provided, as well as extensive carriage cleaning facilities and resignalling. The station was "rapidly developing as the largest railway centre in West Wales".

== Closure ==
Although the Newcastle Emlyn branch (as it had become) was busy and popular in the 1930s, the thinly scattered population of the area served by the station and the low level of economic activity made the railway loss-making after World War II. Nationalisation of the railways took place in 1948 and the GWR lines were part of the Western Region of British Railways. Closure of the Pencader to Newcastle Emlyn passenger service to stem financial losses was considered, and the branch closed to passengers after the last train on 13 September 1952. A limited goods service continued, but it too was discontinued on 28 September 1973.

The Carmarthen to Pencader section of the C&CR was now part of the main line to Aberystwyth. Although designated a main line, it was a long and difficult route connecting Carmarthen and Aberystwyth with relatively limited intermediate population centres. In the 1950s holiday trains to the Butlin's Holiday Camp at Pwllheli traversed the route, (Note: For example, the Summer 1960 public timetable for the Western Region of British Railways shows this train running on high summer Saturdays only at 10.10 am from Swansea to Pwllheli, calling (on the C&CR) at Carmarthen and Pencader; it reversed at Aberystwyth and again at Dovey Junction and arrived at Penychain (for the holiday camp) at 4.56 pm and Pwllheli at 5.5 pm. The southbound train ran from Penychain (10.18 am) to Carmarthen (3.55 pm) only, following the same route.) but in the economic conditions prevailing in the 1960s, it too came under review. The line closed to passengers on 22 February 1965. The main line continued to serve a creamery at Pont Llanio near Llanddewi Brefi, which survived until 1970; milk trains also used the Aberayron branch as far as a creamery at Green Grove near Felin Fach, which remained in service until 1973.

The South Wales Railway station at Carmarthen Junction having long since closed, the 1931 "Town" station located on the C&CR line is the only Carmarthen station, and it remains in use at the present day: all passenger trains (except certain Fishguard boat trains that omit a Carmarthen stop) use it. The short section from Myrtle Hill Junction to the station is the only section of the Carmarthen and Cardigan Railway network still in use.

== Locations ==
- Newcastle Emlyn; opened 1 July 1895; closed 15 September 1952;
- Henllan; opened 1 July 1895; closed 15 September 1952;
- Allt-y-cefn tunnel;
- Pentrecourt Platform; opened 1 February 1912; closed 15 September 1952;
- Llandyssil; opened 3 June 1864; renamed Llandyssul 1918; renamed Llandysul 1957; closed 15 September 1952;
- Pencader Junction; opened 1 January 1866; closed May 1880;
- Pencader; opened 28 March 1864; closed 22 February 1965;
- Pencader Tunnel;
- Llanpumpsaint; opened 28 March 1864; closed 22 February 1965;
- Conwil; opened 3 September 1860; closed 31 December 1860; reopened 15 August 1861; closed 22 February 1965;
- Bronwydd Arms; opened October 1861; closed 22 February 1965;
- Abergwili Junction; - junction with Llandeilo and Carmarthen
- Carmarthen Town; opened 1 March 1860; closed 13 December 1860; reopened 15 August 1861; closed 1 July 1902; when Carmarthen station opened 18 chains south;
- Carmarthen; opened 1 July 1902; still open;
- Myrtle Hill Junction; junction with former South Wales Railway.

== Broad gauge locomotives ==
=== Sharp, Stewart 4-4-0Ts ===
Heron & Magpie
Type and origin
- Power type: Steam
- Builder: Sharp, Stewart & Co.
Specifications
- Configuration
  - Whyte: 4-4-0T
- Gauge: 7 ft (2,134 mm)
- Leading dia.: 3 ft 3 in (991 mm)
- Driver dia.: 5 ft 3 in (1,600 mm)
- Wheelbase: 18 ft 0 in (5,486 mm)
- Cylinder size: dia × stroke, 17 in × 24 in (432 mm × 610 mm)

- Heron (1861–1872)
- Magpie (1861–1872)

The first two locomotives for the Carmarthen and Cardigan Railway were 4-4-0T locomotives with straight side tanks, built by Sharp, Stewart and Company in 1861.

After the line was converted to standard gauge in 1872, they were sold to the South Devon Railway and Cornwall Railway respectively, although the locomotives for both these railways were worked as a common pool. They were both rebuilt with saddle tanks.

In 1876, they became the property of the Great Western Railway and carried the numbers 2134 and 2135. Magpie was withdrawn in 1889 but Heron lasted until the gauge conversion. It worked the last broad gauge train from Tavistock to Plymouth Millbay railway station on 20 May 1892 before pulling the empty carriages to Swindon railway works for dismantling.

The locomotives were named after birds. See Heron and Magpie.

=== Rothwell 4-4-0STs ===
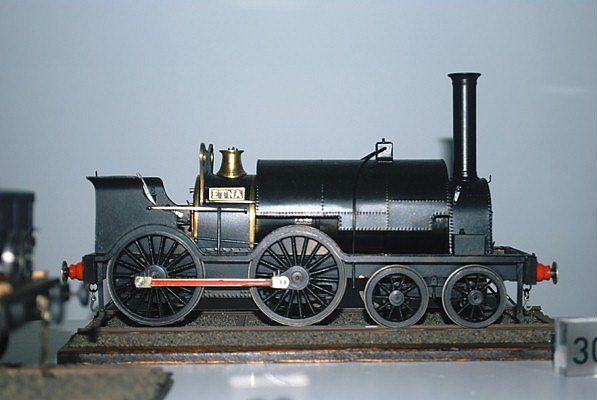
Model of Etna in Swansea Maritime Museum

Etna & Hecla
Type and origin
- Power type: Steam
- Builder: Rothwell and Company
Specifications
- Configuration
  - Whyte: 4-4-0ST
- Gauge: 7 ft (2,134 mm)
- Leading dia.: 3 ft 6 in (1,067 mm)
- Driver dia.: 5 ft 3 in (1,600 mm), later 5 ft 6 in (1,676 mm)
- Wheelbase: 18 ft 4 1/2 in (5,601 mm)
- Cylinder size: dia × stroke, 17 in × 24 in (432 mm × 610 mm)

- Etna (1864–1868)
- Hecla (1864–1872)

Two more locomotives were built by Rothwell and Company in 1864, this time with saddle tanks rather than side tanks.

Etna was sold to the South Devon Railway in 1868, and Hecla followed when the gauge was converted in 1872. They received the numbers 2132 and 2133; at some time Etna received a new saddle tank and its name was lost. They both survived until the end of the broad gauge in 1892.

The locomotives were named after volcanoes. See Mount Etna and Hekla.

== Standard gauge locomotives ==
Four standard gauge locomotives were operated by the Carmarthen and Cardigan Railway, three of them secondhand from the Great Western Railway.

== See also ==
- Hughes's locomotive of September 1863
