= List of communities in Carmarthenshire =

The communities of Carmarthenshire in 2024.

Carmarthenshire is a county in the south-west of Wales. It is one of the 22 principal areas of Wales.

Communities are the lowest tier of local government in Wales. Unlike English counties, which often contain unparished areas, all Welsh principal areas are entirely divided into communities.

There are 72 communities in Carmarthenshire, with Cynwyl Gaeo being the largest and Llanelli the most populated. All of them have a community council, with eleven calling themselves town councils in Ammanford, Carmarthen, Cwmamman, Kidwelly, Llandeilo, Llandovery, Llanelli, Newcastle Emlyn, Pembrey and Burry Port Town, St Clears and Whitland.

== List of communities in Carmarthenshire ==
Community		Population (2011)	Area (km^{2}, 2011)	Pre-1974 district	Remarks	Refs	Location map
English	Welsh	Population (2011)	Area (km^{2}, 2011)	Pre-1974 district	Remarks	Refs	Location map
Abergwili	Abergwili	1,612	30.71	Carmarthen Rural District	Includes Llanfihangel-uwch-Gwili and Peniel.		
Abernant	Abernant	297	22.05	Carmarthen Rural District	Includes Talog.		
Ammanford	Rhydaman	5,411	3.12	Ammanford Urban District	Town. Includes Pantyffynnon.		
Betws	Betws	2,175	11.16	Llandeilo Rural District			
Bronwydd	Bronwydd	564	8.8	Carmarthen Rural District			
Carmarthen	Caerfyrddin	14,185	20.88	Carmarthen Municipal Borough	Town. Includes Llanllwch.		
Cenarth	Cenarth	1,030	43.68	Newcastle Emlyn Rural District	Includes part of Cilrhedyn.		
Cilycwm	Cil-y-cwm	487	74.42	Llandeilo Rural District			
Cilymaenllwyd	Cilymaenllwyd	742	26.8	Carmarthen Rural District	Includes Login.		
Cwmamman	Cwmamman	4,486	27.46	Cwmamman Urban District	Town. Includes Garnant and Glanamman.		
Cynwyl Elfed	Cynwyl Elfed	1,044	59.58	Carmarthen Rural District	Includes Blaenycoed and Cwmduad.		
Cynwyl Gaeo	Cynwyl Gaeo	940	108.4	Llandeilo Rural District	Includes Aberbowlan, Caio, Ffarmers and Pumsaint.		
Dyffryn Cennen	Dyffryn Cennen	1,176	42.34	Llandeilo Rural District	Includes Ffairfach and Trap.		
Eglwyscummin	Eglwys Gymyn	432	42.38	Carmarthen Rural District	Includes Red Roses.		
Gorslas	Gorslas	4,066	16.57	Carmarthen Rural District	Includes Cefneithin and Foelgastell.		
Henllanfallteg	Henllan Fallteg	480	16.14	Carmarthen and Narberth Rural Districts	Includes Henllan Amgoed.		
Kidwelly	Cydweli	3,523	11.66	Kidwelly Municipal Borough	Town. Includes Mynydd-y-Garreg.		
Laugharne Township	Treflan Lacharn	1,222	25.72	Carmarthen Rural District	Includes Llandawke.		
Llanarthney	Llanarthne	765	27.92	Carmarthen Rural District	Includes Capel Dewi.		
Llanboidy	Llanboidy	1,061	62.45	Carmarthen Rural District			
Llanddarog	Llanddarog	1,198	16.56	Carmarthen Rural District	Includes Mynyddcerrig.		
Llanddeusant	Llanddeusant	220	61.53	Llandeilo Rural District			
Llanddowror	Llanddowror	851	28.73	Carmarthen Rural District	Includes Llanmiloe.		
Llandeilo	Llandeilo	1,795	5.14	Llandeilo Rural and Urban Districts	Town.		
Llandovery	Llanymddyfri	2,065	19.13	Llandeilo Rural District and Llandovery Municipal Borough	Town.		
Llandybie	Llandybïe	10,994	41.64	Llandeilo Rural District	Includes Derwydd, Pen-y-groes and Saron.		
Llandyfaelog	Llandyfaelog	1,304	34.66	Carmarthen Rural District	Includes Cwmffrwd, Idole and Upland Arms.		
Llanedi	Llanedi	5,664	26.26	Llanelli Rural District	Includes Hendy and Tycroes.		
Llanegwad	Llanegwad	1,473	53.83	Llandeilo Rural District	Includes Nantgaredig and Pont-ar-Gothi.		
Llanelli	Llanelli	25,168	9.59	Llanelli Municipal Borough	Town. Includes Machynys.		
Llanelli Rural	Llanelli Gwledig	22,800	62.12	Llanelli Rural District	Includes Bryn, Bynea, Cwmbach, Cwmcarnhywel, Dafen, Felinfoel, Five Roads, Furnace, Horeb, Llwynhendy, Pemberton, part of Pont Henri, part of Pontyates, Pwll and Sandy.		
Llanfair-ar-y-bryn	Llanfair-ar-y-bryn	624	96.87	Llandeilo Rural District	Includes Abercrychan, Babel, Cynghordy, Rhandirmwyn.		
Llanfihangel Aberbythych	Llanfihangel Aberbythych	1,344	26.39	Llandeilo Rural District	Includes Carmel, Maesybont and Milo.		
Llanfihangel-ar-Arth	Llanfihangel-ar-Arth	2,213	62.55	Newcastle Emlyn Rural District	Includes Alltwalis, Gwyddgrug, New Inn and Pencader.		
Llanfihangel Rhos-y-Corn	Llanfihangel Rhos-y-Corn	468	50.99	Newcastle Emlyn Rural District	Includes Abergorlech, Brechfa and Gwernogle.		
Llanfynydd	Llanfynydd	499	43.91	Llandeilo Rural District			
Llangadog	Llangadog	1,311	76.63	Llandeilo Rural District	Includes Bethlehem, Bont Fawr and Gwynfe.		
Llangain	Llangain	573	11.05	Carmarthen Rural District			
Llangathen	Llangathen	507	23.11	Llandeilo Rural District			
Llangeler	Llangeler	3,427	60.31	Newcastle Emlyn Rural District	Includes Cwmhiraeth, Cwmpengraig, Dre-fach Felindre, Penboyr and Pentrecwrt.		
Llangennech	Llangennech	4,964	12.22	Llanelli Rural District			
Llangunnor	Llangunnor	2,381	23.15	Carmarthen Rural District	Includes Nantycaws.		
Llangyndeyrn	Llangyndeyrn	3,102	47.2	Carmarthen Rural District	Includes Carway, part of Pont Henri and part of Pontyates.		
Llangynin	Llangynin	284	13.13	Carmarthen Rural District			
Llangynog	Llangynog	492	26.6	Carmarthen Rural District			
Llanllawddog	Llanllawddog	703	32.06	Carmarthen Rural District	Includes Pontarsais and Rhydargaeau.		
Llanllwni	Llanllwni	638	26.73	Newcastle Emlyn Rural District	Includes Aber-giar.		
Llannon	Llannon	5,270	38.49	Llanelli Rural District	Includes Cross Hands and Tumble.		
Llanpumsaint	Llanpumsaint	734	26.1	Carmarthen Rural District			
Llansadwrn	Llansadwrn	517	29.88	Llandeilo Rural District			
Llansawel	Llansawel	438	40.79	Llandeilo Rural District	Includes Edwinsford.		
Llansteffan	Llansteffan	941	21.21	Carmarthen Rural District	Includes Llanybri.		
Llanwinio	Llanwinio	448	29.32	Carmarthen Rural District	Includes Blaenwaun and Cwmfelin Mynach.		
Llanwrda	Llanwrda	514	23.18	Llandeilo Rural District	Includes Crugybar.		
Llanybydder	Llanybydder	1,638	36.71	Newcastle Emlyn Rural District	Includes Rhydcymerau.		
Llanycrwys	Llanycrwys	235	13.64	Newcastle Emlyn Rural District	Includes Ffaldybrenin.		
Manordeilo and Salem	Maenordeilo a Salem	1,754	55.44	Llandeilo Rural District	Includes Cwmifor and Manordeilo.		
Meidrim	Meidrim	582	26.52	Carmarthen Rural District			
Myddfai	Myddfai	398	54.27	Llandeilo Rural District			
Newcastle Emlyn	Castellnewydd Emlyn	1,184	2.91	Newcastle Emlyn Urban District	Town. Includes Aber-arad.		
Newchurch and Merthyr	Llannewydd a Merthyr	676	25.07	Carmarthen Rural District	Includes Ffynnon-ddrain and Llannewydd.		
Pembrey and Burry Port Town	Pen-bre a Phorth Tywyn	8,547	41.46	Llanelli Rural and Burry Port Urban Districts	Town. Includes Burry Port and Pembrey.		
Pencarreg	Pencarreg	1,169	34.61	Newcastle Emlyn Rural District	Includes Cwmann and Parc y Rhos.		
Pendine	Pentywyn	346	4.1	Carmarthen Rural District			
Pontyberem	Pontyberem	2,768	13.35	Llanelli Rural District			
Quarter Bach	Cwarter Bach	2,921	32.05	Llandeilo Rural District	Includes part of Brynamman.		
St Clears	Sanclêr	2,995	30.56	Carmarthen Rural District	Town. Includes Backe and Bancyfelin.		
St Ishmael	Llanismel	1,370	18.57	Carmarthen Rural District	Includes Ferryside and Llansaint.		
Talley	Talyllychau	494	24.77	Llandeilo Rural District			
Trelech	Tre-lech	745	46.89	Carmarthen Rural District			
Trimsaran	Trimsaran	2,541	19.89	Llanelli Rural District			
Whitland	Hendy-gwyn	1,792	6.28	Carmarthen Rural District	Town.		
