= List of standardised Welsh place-names in Carmarthenshire =

Location of Carmarthenshire in Wales.

The list of standardised Welsh place-names, for places in Carmarthenshire, is a list compiled by the Welsh Language Commissioner to recommend the standardisation of the spelling of Welsh place-names, particularly in the Welsh language and when multiple forms are used, although some place-names in English were also recommended to be matched with the Welsh. The list contains 356 entries, as of November 2023.

The list is based on recommendations provided by the Place-names Standardisation Panel, convened by the Commissioner, for expert advice on the standardisation of Welsh place-names. The panel bases their decisions on a set of guidelines (currently dating to June 2023), specific to Welsh settlement names (such as those of villages, towns, and cities) and topographic features (such as lakes, mountains and rivers). The panel does not cover house or building names, although similar principles could be applied to them or to names for new developments (for which the Commissioner offers their own advice to local authorities and housing developers). The panel may also have used additional guidelines.

The list was first published in 2018, and took years to put together. Upon creation, these lists were published under the Open Government Licence 3.0.

== List ==
Recommended standardised names		Other name/spelling not recommended	Type	Grid reference
Welsh	English	Other name/spelling not recommended	Type	Grid reference
Aberarad	Aberarad	Aber-arad	Settlement	SN3140
Aberbowlan	Aberbowlan		Settlement	SN6938
Aberduar	Aberduar		Settlement	SN5244
Abergiâr	Abergiâr	Aber-giar	Settlement	SN5040
Aberglasne	Aberglasney		Settlement	SN5822
Abergorlech	Abergorlech		Settlement	SN5833
Abergwili	Abergwili		Settlement	SN4321
Aberhalen	Aberhalen		Settlement	SN3340
Aber-lash	Aber-lash		Settlement	SN6214
Aber-nant	Aber-nant	Abernant	Settlement	SN3323
Achddu	Achddu		Settlement	SN4401
Allt	Allt		Settlement	SN5502
Alltwalis	Alltwalis		Settlement	SN4431
Ashfield	Ashfield		Settlement	SN6928
Babel	Babel		Settlement	SN8335
Bancffosfelen	Bancffosfelen		Settlement	SN4811
Bancycapel	Bancycapel		Settlement	SN4315
Bancyfelin	Bancyfelin		Settlement	SN3218
Banc-y-ffordd	Banc-y-ffordd		Settlement	SN4037
Bancymansel	Bancymansel		Area	SN5214
Bethlehem	Bethlehem		Settlement	SN6825
Y Betws	Y Betws	Betws	Settlement	SN6311
Bigyn	Bigyn		Settlement	SS5199
Blaenhalen	Blaenhalen		Settlement	SN3339
Blaen-nos	Blaen-nos		Settlement	SN7534
Blaen-waun	Blaen-waun	Blaenwaun	Settlement	SN2327
Blaen-y-coed	Blaen-y-coed	Blaenycoed	Settlement	SN3427
Bola-haul	Bola-haul	Bolahaul	Settlement	SN4218
Bont-fawr	Bont-fawr	Bont Fawr	Settlement	SN7125
Box	Box		Settlement	SN5100
Brechfa	Brechfa		Settlement	SN5230
Broadlay	Broadlay		Settlement	SN3709
Broadway	Broadway		Settlement	SN2910
Broadway	Broadway		Settlement	SN3808
Bronwydd	Bronwydd		Settlement	SN4124
Brook	Brook		Settlement	SN2609
Brynaman	Brynaman	Brynamman	Settlement	SN7114
Brynaman Uchaf	Brynaman Uchaf		Area	SN7114
Bryn-du	Bryn-du		Settlement	SN5309
Brynmyrddin	Brynmyrddin		Settlement	SN4421
Brynteifi	Brynteifi		Area	SN4539
Bwlchnewydd	Bwlchnewydd		Settlement	SN3624
Cae’r-bryn	Cae’r-bryn		Settlement	SN5913
Caeo	Caeo	Caio	Settlement	SN6739
Caerfyrddin	Carmarthen		Settlement	SN4120
Capel	Capel		Area	SN5200
Capel Dewi	Capel Dewi		Settlement	SN4720
Capel Gwynfe	Capel Gwynfe		Settlement	SN7222
Capel Hendre	Capel Hendre		Settlement	SN5911
Capel Isaac	Capel Isaac		Area	SN5826
Capel Iwan	Capel Iwan		Settlement	SN2936
Capel Seion	Capel Seion		Settlement	SN5113
Carmel	Carmel		Settlement	SN5816
Carreg Cennen	Carreg Cennen	Carreg Cennan	Man-made feature	SN6618
Carwe	Carwe	Carway	Settlement	SN4606
Castellnewydd Emlyn	Newcastle Emlyn		Settlement	SN3040
Castellyrhingyll	Castellyrhingyll		Area	SN5714
Cefn-bryn-brain	Cefn-bryn-brain		Settlement	SN7413
Cefncaeau	Cefncaeau		Area	SS5399
Cefneithin	Cefneithin		Settlement	SN5513
Cefn-y-pant	Cefn-y-pant		Settlement	SN1925
Cenarth	Cenarth		Settlement	SN2641
Cilsân	Cilsân	Cilsane	Settlement	SN5922
Cil-y-cwm	Cil-y-cwm	Cilycwm	Settlement	SN7540
Cilymaenllwyd	Cilymaenllwyd		Parish	SN1424
Cloigyn	Cloigyn		Settlement	SN4314
Coopers	Coopers		Settlement	SN5910
Croesyceiliog	Croesyceiliog		Settlement	SN4016
Cross Hands	Cross Hands		Settlement	SN5612
Cross Inn	Cross Inn		Settlement	SN2912
Crosshands	Crosshands		Settlement	SN1922
Crug-y-bar	Crug-y-bar	Crugybar	Settlement	SN6537
Crwbin	Crwbin		Settlement	SN4713
Cwm Capel	Cwm Capel		Area	SN4502
Cwm-ann	Cwm-ann	Cwmann	Settlement	SN5847
Cwm-bach	Cwm-bach	Cwmbach	Settlement	SN2525
Cwm-byr	Cwm-byr		Settlement	SN6332
Cwmcarnhywel	Cwmcarnhywel		Area	SN5300
Cwm-cuch	Cwm-cuch	Cwmcych	Settlement	SN2736
Cwm-du	Cwm-du		Settlement	SN6330
Cwmduad	Cwmduad		Settlement	SN3731
Cwmdŵr	Cwmdŵr		Settlement	SN7032
Cwmdwyfran	Cwmdwyfran		Settlement	SN4126
Cwmfelin-boeth	Cwmfelin-boeth		Settlement	SN1919
Cwmfelinmynach	Cwmfelinmynach	Cwmfelin Mynach	Settlement	SN2224
Cwm-ffrwd	Cwm-ffrwd	Cwmffrwd	Settlement	SN4217
Cwmgwili	Cwmgwili		Settlement	SN5710
Cwmhiraeth	Cwmhiraeth		Settlement	SN3437
Cwmifor	Cwmifor		Settlement	SN6525
Cwmisfael	Cwmisfael		Settlement	SN4915
Cwmllethryd	Cwmllethryd		Settlement	SN4911
Cwm-mawr	Cwm-mawr		Settlement	SN5312
Cwm-miles	Cwm-miles		Settlement	SN1622
Cwm-morgan	Cwm-morgan		Settlement	SN2934
Cwmoernant	Cwmoernant		Area	SN4121
Cwm-pen-graig	Cwm-pen-graig	Cwmpengraig	Settlement	SN3436
Cwm-y-glo	Cwm-y-glo		Settlement	SN5513
Cwrt-henri	Cwrt-henri		Settlement	SN5522
Cwrtycadno	Cwrtycadno		Settlement	SN6944
Cydweli	Cydweli	Kidwelly	Settlement	SN4006
Cynghordy	Cynghordy		Settlement	SN8040
Cynheidre	Cynheidre		Settlement	SN4907
Cynwyl Elfed	Cynwyl Elfed		Settlement	SN3727
Dafen	Dafen		Settlement	SN5201
Danrhelyg	Danrhelyg		Settlement	SN2939
Derwen-fawr	Broad Oak		Settlement	SN5722
Derwydd	Derwydd		Settlement	SN6117
Dinas	Dinas		Settlement	SN2730
Dre-fach	Dre-fach		Settlement	SN2920
Dre-fach	Dre-fach		Settlement	SN5213
Dre-fach	Dre-fach		Settlement	SN6516
Dre-fach Felindre	Dre-fach Felindre		Settlement	SN3538
Drefelin	Drefelin		Settlement	SN3638
Dryslwyn	Dryslwyn		Settlement	SN5520
Efail-wen	Efail-wen	Efailwen	Settlement	SN1325
Esgair	Esgair		Settlement	SN3728
Esgairdawe	Esgairdawe		Settlement	SN6140
Felindre	Felindre		Settlement	SN3538
Felindre	Felindre		Settlement	SN5521
Felindre	Felindre		Settlement	SN7027
Felin-foel	Felin-foel	Felinfoel	Settlement	SN5202
Felin-gwm Isaf	Felin-gwm Isaf		Settlement	SN5023
Felin-gwm Uchaf	Felin-gwm Uchaf		Settlement	SN5024
Felin-wen	Felin-wen		Settlement	SN4621
Ffair-fach	Ffair-fach	Ffairfach	Settlement	SN6221
Ffaldybrenin	Ffaldybrenin		Settlement	SN6344
Ffarmers	Ffarmers		Settlement	SN6544
Fferws Hill	Fferws Hill		Settlement	SN6011
Fforest	Fforest		Settlement	SN5804
Ffwrnais	Furnace		Settlement	SN5001
Ffynnon	Ffynnon		Settlement	SN3516
Ffynnon-ddrain	Ffynnon-ddrain		Settlement	SN4021
Foelgastell	Foelgastell		Settlement	SN5414
Y Garnant	Y Garnant	Garnant	Settlement	SN6813
Gelli-aur	Golden Grove		Settlement	SN5819
Gelli-wen	Gelli-wen		Settlement	SN2723
Glanaman	Glanaman	Glanamman	Settlement	SN6713
Glanduar	Glanduar		Area	SN5243
Glandŵr	Glandŵr		Settlement	SN2641
Glandy Cross	Glandy Cross		Settlement	SN1426
Glangwili	Glangwili		Area	SN4322
Glanmwrwg	Glanmwrwg		Settlement	SN5501
Glanyfferi	Ferryside		Settlement	SN3610
Glan-y-môr	Seaside		Area	SS5099
Glyn-teg	Glyn-teg		Settlement	SN3637
Gors-goch	Gors-goch		Settlement	SN5713
Gors-las	Gors-las	Gorslas	Settlement	SN5713
Y Graig	Y Graig		Settlement	SN4401
Gwernogle	Gwernogle		Settlement	SN5334
Gwyddgrug	Gwyddgrug		Settlement	SN4635
Halfpenny Furze	Halfpenny Furze		Settlement	SN2713
Halfway	Halfway		Settlement	SN5200
Halfway	Halfway		Settlement	SN8232
Harford	Harford		Settlement	SN6343
Hebron	Hebron		Settlement	SN1827
Yr Hendy	Yr Hendy	Hendy	Settlement	SN5803
Hendy-gwyn ar Daf	Whitland		Settlement	SN2016
Henllan Amgoed	Henllan Amgoed		Settlement	SN1820
Heol-ddu	Heol-ddu		Settlement	SN4603
Heolgaled	Heolgaled		Settlement	SN6226
Hermon	Hermon		Settlement	SN3630
Hiraeth	Hiraeth		Settlement	SN1721
Hopkinstown	Hopkinstown		Area	SN6412
Horeb	Horeb		Settlement	SN4905
Horeb	Horeb		Settlement	SN5128
Idole	Idole		Settlement	SN4215
Iet-y-bwlch	Iet-y-bwlch		Settlement	SN1628
Lacharn	Laugharne		Settlement	SN3010
Llanarthne	Llanarthne	Llanarthney	Settlement	SN5320
Llanboidy	Llanboidy		Settlement	SN2123
Llan-dawg	Llan-dawg		Settlement	SN2811
Llanddarog	Llanddarog		Settlement	SN5016
Llanddeusant	Llanddeusant		Settlement	SN7724
Llanddowror	Llanddowror		Settlement	SN2514
Llandeilo	Llandeilo		Settlement	SN6222
Llandybïe	Llandybïe	Llandybie	Settlement	SN6115
Llandyfaelog	Llandyfaelog		Settlement	SN4111
Llandyfân	Llandyfân		Settlement	SN6417
Llandyry	Llandyry		Settlement	SN4304
Llanedi	Llanedi		Settlement	SN5807
Llanegwad	Llanegwad		Settlement	SN5121
Llanelli	Llanelli		Settlement	SN5000
Llanfallteg	Llanfallteg		Settlement	SN1519
Llanfihangel-ar-arth	Llanfihangel-ar-arth	Llanfihangel-ar-Arth	Settlement	SN4539
Llanfihangel-uwch-Gwili	Llanfihangel-uwch-Gwili		Settlement	SN4822
Llanfynydd	Llanfynydd		Settlement	SN5527
Llangadog	Llangadog		Settlement	SN4207
Llangadog	Llangadog		Settlement	SN7028
Llan-gain	Llan-gain	Llangain	Settlement	SN3815
Llangathen	Llangathen		Settlement	SN5822
Llangeler	Llangeler		Settlement	SN3739
Llangennech	Llangennech		Settlement	SN5501
Llanglydwen	Llanglydwen		Settlement	SN1826
Llangyndeyrn	Llangyndeyrn		Settlement	SN4514
Llangynin	Llangynin		Settlement	SN2519
Llangynnwr	Llangynnwr	Llangunnor	Settlement	SN4320
Llangynog	Llangynog		Settlement	SN3316
Llanllawddog	Llanllawddog		Settlement	SN4529
Llan-llwch	Llan-llwch	Llanllwch	Settlement	SN3818
Llanllwni	Llanllwni		Settlement	SN4939
Llanmilo	Llanmilo	Llanmiloe	Settlement	SN2508
Llannewydd	Newchurch		Settlement	SN3824
Llan-non	Llan-non		Settlement	SN5308
Llanpumsaint	Llanpumsaint		Settlement	SN4129
Llansadwrn	Llansadwrn		Settlement	SN6931
Llansadyrnin	Llansadyrnin		Settlement	SN2810
Llan-saint	Llan-saint	Llansaint	Settlement	SN3808
Llansawel	Llansawel		Settlement	SN6136
Llansteffan	Llansteffan		Settlement	SN3510
Llanwinio	Llanwinio		Settlement	SN2626
Llanwrda	Llanwrda		Settlement	SN7131
Llan-y-bri	Llan-y-bri	Llanybri	Settlement	SN3312
Llanybydder	Llanybydder		Settlement	SN5244
Llan-y-crwys	Llan-y-crwys	Llanycrwys	Settlement	SN6245
Llanymddyfri	Llandovery		Settlement	SN7634
Llidiadnennog	Llidiadnennog		Settlement	SN5437
Llwynhendy	Llwynhendy		Settlement	SS5499
Llwyn-teg	Llwyn-teg		Settlement	SN5508
Llwyn-y-brain	Llwyn-y-brain		Settlement	SN1915
Login	Login		Settlement	SN1623
Machynys	Machynys		Settlement	SS5198
Maenlle-gwaun	Maenlle-gwaun		Settlement	SN3536
Maenordeilo	Maenordeilo	Manordeilo	Settlement	SN6626
Maerdy	Maerdy		Settlement	SN6220
Maes-y-bont	Maes-y-bont	Maesybont	Settlement	SN5616
Maesycrugiau	Maesycrugiau		Area	SN4741
Marros	Marros		Settlement	SN2008
Meidrim	Meidrim		Settlement	SN2820
Merthyr	Merthyr		Area	SN3520
Milo	Milo		Settlement	SN5917
Morfa	Morfa		Settlement	SN5712
Morfa	Morfa		Area	SS5198
Morfa-bach	Morfa-bach		Settlement	SN3613
Myddfai	Myddfai		Settlement	SN7730
Myddynfych	Myddynfych		Settlement	SN6213
Mynyddcerrig	Mynyddcerrig		Settlement	SN5013
Mynyddygarreg	Mynyddygarreg	Mynydd-y-Garreg	Settlement	SN4208
Nantgaredig	Nantgaredig		Settlement	SN4921
Nant-y-bai	Nant-y-bai		Settlement	SN7744
Nant-y-caws	Nant-y-caws	Nantycaws	Settlement	SN4518
Nant-y-ffin	Nant-y-ffin		Settlement	SN5532
Nantyrhibo	Nantyrhibo		Area	SN6223
Neuadd	Neuadd		Settlement	SN6921
New Inn	New Inn		Settlement	SN4736
Pant-y-caws	Pant-y-caws	Pant-y-Caws	Settlement	SN1426
Pantycendy	Pantycendy		Area	SN3423
Pantyffynnon	Pantyffynnon		Area	SN6210
Parc-y-rhos	Parc-y-rhos		Area	SN5746
Pedair-hewl	Four Roads		Settlement	SN4409
Pemberton	Pemberton		Area	SN5300
Pen-boyr	Pen-boyr	Penboyr	Settlement	SN3536
Pen-bre	Pen-bre	Pembrey	Settlement	SN4201
Pencader	Pencader		Settlement	SN4436
Pencarreg	Pencarreg		Settlement	SN5345
Penceiliogi	Penceiliogi	Penceilogi	Area	SN5300
Pendderi	Pendderi		Settlement	SN5400
Peniel	Peniel		Settlement	SN4324
Pen-lan	Pen-lan		Area	SN3040
Pen-plas	Pen-plas		Settlement	SN3517
Penrherber	Penrherber		Settlement	SN2838
Penrhiw-goch	Penrhiw-goch		Area	SN5518
Pen-sarn	Pen-sarn		Settlement	SN4119
Pentowin	Pentowin		Settlement	SN2918
Pentrecagal	Pentrecagal		Settlement	SN3440
Pentre-cwrt	Pentre-cwrt	Pentrecwrt	Settlement	SN3838
Pentrefelin	Pentrefelin		Settlement	SN5923
Pentregwenlais	Pentregwenlais		Settlement	SN6016
Pentremorgan	Pentremorgan		Settlement	SN4025
Pentre-poeth	Pentre-poeth		Area	SN4115
Pentre-poeth	Pentre-poeth		Area	SN5001
Pen-twyn	Pen-twyn		Settlement	SN5611
Pentywyn	Pendine		Settlement	SN2308
Pen-y-banc	Pen-y-banc		Settlement	SN6111
Pen-y-banc	Pen-y-banc		Settlement	SN6124
Pen-y-bedd	Pen-y-bedd		Settlement	SN4102
Pen-y-bont	Pen-y-bont		Settlement	SN3027
Pen-y-fai	Pen-y-fai		Area	SN4901
Pen-y-fan	Pen-y-fan		Area	SS5199
Pen-y-garn	Pen-y-garn		Area	SN5731
Pen-y-groes	Pen-y-groes		Settlement	SN5813
Pibwr-lwyd	Pibwr-lwyd		Settlement	SN4118
Picton Ferry	Picton Ferry		Area	SN2717
Pinged	Pinged		Area	SN4203
Plashett	Plashett		Settlement	SN2709
Pontaman	Pontaman	Pontamman	Settlement	SN6412
Pontantwn	Pontantwn		Settlement	SN4413
Pontargothi	Pontargothi	Pont-ar-Gothi	Settlement	SN5021
Pontarllechau	Pontarllechau		Area	SN7224
Pont-ar-sais	Pont-ar-sais	Pontarsais	Settlement	SN4428
Pont-henri	Pont-henri	Pont Henri	Settlement	SN4709
Pont-iets	Pont-iets	Pontyates	Settlement	SN4608
Pontnewydd	Pontnewydd		Settlement	SN4407
Pont-tyweli	Pont-tyweli	Pontwelly	Settlement	SN4140
Pontyberem	Pontyberem		Settlement	SN5011
Pontyfelin	Pontyfelin		Settlement	SN5312
Pontyfenni	Pontyfenni		Settlement	SN2317
Porth Tywyn	Burry Port		Settlement	SN4401
Porth-y-rhyd	Porth-y-rhyd		Settlement	SN5115
Porth-y-rhyd	Porth-y-rhyd		Settlement	SN7137
Pump-hewl	Five Roads		Settlement	SN4805
Pumsaint	Pumsaint		Settlement	SN6540
Pwll-trap	Pwll-trap		Settlement	SN2616
Ram	Ram		Settlement	SN5846
Rhandir-mwyn	Rhandir-mwyn	Rhandirmwyn	Settlement	SN7843
Rhos	Rhos		Settlement	SN3835
Rhosaman	Rhosaman		Settlement	SN7314
Rhos-goch	Red Roses		Settlement	SN2011
Rhos-maen	Rhos-maen		Settlement	SN6323
Rhosyn-coch	Rhosyn-coch		Settlement	SN2921
Rhydaman	Ammanford		Settlement	SN6212
Rhydargaeau	Rhydargaeau		Settlement	SN4326
Rhydcymerau	Rhydcymerau		Settlement	SN5738
Rhydodyn	Edwinsford		Man-made feature	SN6334
Rhydowen	Rhydowen		Area	SN1928
Rhydsarnau	Rhydsarnau		Area	SN5710
Rhyd-wen	Rhyd-wen		Area	SN7313
Rhydwilym	Rhydwilym		Settlement	SN1124
Rhydyfelin	Rhydyfelin		Settlement	SN2837
Rhyd-y-wrach	Rhyd-y-wrach		Settlement	SN1619
Sanclêr	St Clears		Settlement	SN2716
Saron	Saron		Settlement	SN3737
Saron	Saron		Settlement	SN6012
Siloh	Siloh			SN7437
Sylen	Sylen		Settlement	SN5106
Taliaris	Taliaris		Area	SN6428
Talog	Talog		Settlement	SN3325
Talyllychau	Talley		Settlement	SN6332
Tanerdy	Tanerdy		Settlement	SN4221
Tanglwst	Tanglwst		Settlement	SN3134
Temple Bar	Temple Bar		Settlement	SN5817
Tir Syr Walter	Tir Syr Walter		Area	SN6913
Tir-y-dail	Tir-y-dail		Area	SN6213
Trap	Trap		Settlement	SN6518
Travellers Rest	Travellers Rest		Settlement	SN3819
Tre loan	Johnstown		Settlement	SN3919
Trebedw	Trebedw		Settlement	SN3640
Trefechan	Trevaughan		Settlement	SN4021
Tregynnwr	Tregynnwr		Area	SN4119
Treherbert	Treherbert		Settlement	SN5846
Tre-lech	Tre-lech	Trelech	Settlement	SN2830
Tre-lech a'r Betws	Tre-lech a'r Betws		Settlement	SN3026
Tre-wen	Tre-wen	Tre-Wen	Settlement	SN2941
Trimsaran	Trimsaran		Settlement	SN4505
Trostre	Trostre		Area	SS5299
Twynllannan	Twynllannan		Settlement	SN7524
Tŷ-croes	Tŷ-croes	Tycroes	Settlement	SN6010
Tyle	Tyle		Settlement	SN6726
Tŷ-mawr	Tŷ-mawr		Settlement	SN5442
Y Tymbl	Y Tymbl	Tumble	Settlement	SN5411
Tŷ'r-frân	Tŷ'r-frân		Area	SN5101
Waunclunda	Waunclunda		Area	SN6831
Waungilwen	Waungilwen		Settlement	SN3439
Waun-y-clun	Waun-y-clun		Settlement	SN4504
Wern	Wern		Area	SS5099
Ysbyty	Ysbyty		Settlement	SS5598
Ystradowen	Ystradowen		Settlement	SN7512
