= List of United Kingdom locations: Miln-Mix =

The United Kingdom

This is part of the list of United Kingdom locations: a gazetteer of place names in the United Kingdom showing each place's locality and geographical coordinates.

== Mil (continued) ==
=== Miln-Milz ===
Location	Locality	Coordinates (links to map & photo sources)	OS grid reference
Milnafua	Highland	57.70°N 04.23°W	NH6770
Milnathort	Perth and Kinross	56.22°N 03.42°W	NO1204
Milners Heath	Cheshire	53.16°N 02.80°W	SJ4663
Milngavie	East Dunbartonshire	55.93°N 04.32°W	NS5574
Milnquarter	Falkirk	55.98°N 03.90°W	NS8179
Milnrow	Rochdale	53.60°N 02.12°W	SD9212
Milnsbridge	Kirklees	53.63°N 01.83°W	SE1115
Milnshaw	Lancashire	53.75°N 02.38°W	SD7529
Milnthorpe	Cumbria	54.22°N 02.78°W	SD4981
Milnthorpe	Wakefield	53.64°N 01.50°W	SE3317
Milnwood	North Lanarkshire	55.80°N 04.01°W	NS7459
Milo	Carmarthenshire	51.83°N 04.04°W	SN5917
Milson	Shropshire	52.34°N 02.54°W	SO6372
Milstead	Kent	51.28°N 00.72°E	TQ9058
Milston	Wiltshire	51.20°N 01.77°W	SU1645
Milthorpe	Northamptonshire	52.10°N 01.13°W	SP5946
Milton	Barnsley	53.49°N 01.44°W	SE3700
Milton	Cambridgeshire	52.23°N 00.15°E	TL4762
Milton (Brampton)	Cumbria	54.93°N 02.70°W	NY5560
Milton (Milnthorpe)	Cumbria	54.24°N 02.72°W	SD5383
Milton	Derbyshire	52.83°N 01.52°W	SK3226
Milton (near Crocketford)	Dumfries and Galloway	55.01°N 03.81°W	NX8470
Milton (near Glenluce)	Dumfries and Galloway	54.84°N 04.78°W	NX2154
Milton	City of Glasgow	55.89°N 04.25°W	NS5969
Milton (Easter Ross)	Highland	57.73°N 04.08°W	NH7674
Milton (Muir of Ord)	Highland	57.50°N 04.37°W	NH5849
Milton (Strathcannon Forest)	Highland	57.55°N 04.84°W	NH3055
Milton (Aviemore)	Highland	57.19°N 03.83°W	NH8913
Milton (Glenurquhart)	Highland	57.33°N 04.51°W	NH4930
Milton	Kent	51.44°N 00.37°E	TQ6574
Milton	Moray	57.65°N 02.82°W	NJ5163
Milton	City of Newport	51.58°N 02.92°W	ST3688
Milton	Nottinghamshire	53.24°N 00.93°W	SK7173
Milton (Cherwell)	Oxfordshire	52.01°N 01.34°W	SP4535
Milton (Vale of White Horse)	Oxfordshire	51.62°N 01.30°W	SU4892
Milton	Pembrokeshire	51.69°N 04.85°W	SN0303
Milton	Perth and Kinross	56.28°N 03.69°W	NN9512
Milton	City of Portsmouth	50.78°N 01.06°W	SZ6699
Milton	Powys	52.14°N 03.11°W	SO2450
Milton (Ash)	Somerset	50.98°N 02.77°W	ST4621
Milton (Weston-super-Mare)	Somerset	51.35°N 02.94°W	ST3462
Milton	Stirling	56.17°N 04.41°W	NN5001
Milton	City of Stoke-on-Trent	53.04°N 02.15°W	SJ9050
Milton	West Dunbartonshire	55.93°N 04.53°W	NS4274
Milton	Wiltshire	51.07°N 02.18°W	ST8731
Milton Abbas	Dorset	50.80°N 02.28°W	ST8001
Milton Abbot	Devon	50.58°N 04.26°W	SX4079
Milton Bridge	Midlothian	55.84°N 03.19°W	NT2562
Milton Bryan	Bedfordshire	51.96°N 00.58°W	SP9730
Milton Clevedon	Somerset	51.13°N 02.48°W	ST6637
Milton Common	Oxfordshire	51.72°N 01.06°W	SP6503
Milton Combe	Devon	50.46°N 04.14°W	SX4865
Milton Damerel	Devon	50.86°N 04.30°W	SS3810
Miltonduff	Moray	57.62°N 03.37°W	NJ1860
Milton End (Arlingham)	Gloucestershire	51.78°N 02.42°W	SO7110
Milton End (Fairford)	Gloucestershire	51.69°N 01.79°W	SP1400
Milton Ernest	Bedfordshire	52.19°N 00.52°W	TL0156
Milton Green	Cheshire	53.11°N 02.80°W	SJ4658
Milton Green	Devon	50.57°N 04.26°W	SX4078
Milton Heights	Oxfordshire	51.61°N 01.30°W	SU4891
Milton Hill	Devon	50.59°N 03.52°W	SX9278
Milton Hill	Oxfordshire	51.60°N 01.32°W	SU4790
Milton Keynes	Buckinghamshire	52.02°N 00.45°W	SP8539
Milton Keynes Village	Milton Keynes	52.04°N 00.70°W	SP8939
Milton Lilbourne	Wiltshire	51.33°N 01.74°W	SU1860
Milton Malsor	Northamptonshire	52.18°N 00.93°W	SP7355
Milton Morenish	Perth and Kinross	56.48°N 04.25°W	NN6135
Milton Ness	Aberdeenshire	56.77°N 02.38°W	NO766648
Milton of Balgonie	Fife	56.18°N 03.09°W	NO3200
Milton of Buchanan	Stirling	56.07°N 04.50°W	NS4490
Milton of Campfield	Aberdeenshire	57.09°N 02.59°W	NJ6400
Milton of Campsie	East Dunbartonshire	55.95°N 04.16°W	NS6576
Milton of Cultoquhey	Perth and Kinross	56.37°N 03.79°W	NN8922
Milton of Cushnie	Aberdeenshire	57.18°N 02.79°W	NJ5211
Milton of Dalcapon	Perth and Kinross	56.66°N 03.68°W	NN9754
Milton of Dellavaird	Aberdeenshire	56.92°N 02.44°W	NO7381
Milton of Edradour	Perth and Kinross	56.69°N 03.71°W	NN9557
Milton of Finavon	Angus	56.69°N 02.83°W	NO4956
Milton of Ogilvie	Angus	56.57°N 03.01°W	NO3843
Milton on Stour	Dorset	51.05°N 02.28°W	ST8028
Milton Regis	Kent	51.34°N 00.71°E	TQ8964
Milton Street	East Sussex	50.81°N 00.17°E	TQ5304
Milton-under-Wychwood	Oxfordshire	51.86°N 01.62°W	SP2618
Milverton	Somerset	51.01°N 03.25°W	ST1225
Milverton	Warwickshire	52.29°N 01.56°W	SP3066
Milwich	Staffordshire	52.88°N 02.04°W	SJ9732
Milwr	Flintshire	53.25°N 03.21°W	SJ1974

== Mim-Miz ==
Location	Locality	Coordinates (links to map & photo sources)	OS grid reference
Mimbridge	Surrey	51.33°N 00.59°W	SU9861
Minard	Argyll and Bute	56.11°N 05.26°W	NR9796
Minard Castle	Argyll and Bute	56.09°N 05.26°W	NR9794
Minchington	Dorset	50.92°N 02.05°W	ST9614
Minchinhampton	Gloucestershire	51.69°N 02.20°W	SO8600
Mindrum	Northumberland	55.58°N 02.25°W	NT8432
Minehead	Somerset	51.20°N 03.49°W	SS9646
Minera	Wrexham	53.05°N 03.09°W	SJ2751
Mineshope	Cornwall	50.73°N 04.62°W	SX1596
Minety	Wiltshire	51.60°N 01.97°W	SU0290
Minffordd (Bangor)	Gwynedd	53.20°N 04.14°W	SH5770
Minffordd (Penrhyndeudraeth)	Gwynedd	52.92°N 04.09°W	SH5938
Minffordd (Llanfihangel-y-Pennant)	Gwynedd	52.68°N 03.88°W	SH7311
Mingarrypark	Highland	56.75°N 05.79°W	NM6869
Mingearraidh	Western Isles	57.20°N 07.40°W	NF7426
Minginish	Highland	57.25°N 06.29°W	NG409268
Mingoose	Cornwall	50.28°N 05.21°W	SW7148
Mingulay	Western Isles	56.81°N 07.64°W	NL558831
Miningsby	Lincolnshire	53.15°N 00.02°W	TF3264
Minions	Cornwall	50.51°N 04.45°W	SX2671
Minishant	South Ayrshire	55.39°N 04.63°W	NS3314
Minllyn	Gwynedd	52.71°N 03.70°W	SH8514
Minnigaff	Dumfries and Galloway	54.96°N 04.48°W	NX4166
Minnow End	Essex	51.78°N 00.46°E	TL7012
Minorca	Isle of Man	54.22°N 04.41°W	SC4384
Minskip	North Yorkshire	54.07°N 01.42°W	SE3864
Minstead	Hampshire	50.89°N 01.60°W	SU2811
Minsted	West Sussex	50.98°N 00.79°W	SU8521
Minster-in-Sheppey	Kent	51.42°N 00.80°E	TQ9573
Minster-in-Thanet	Kent	51.32°N 01.30°E	TR3064
Minsterley	Shropshire	52.63°N 02.93°W	SJ3705
Minster Lovell	Oxfordshire	51.78°N 01.55°W	SP3110
Minsterworth	Gloucestershire	51.84°N 02.33°W	SO7716
Minterne Magna	Dorset	50.83°N 02.49°W	ST6504
Minterne Parva	Dorset	50.82°N 02.48°W	ST6603
Minting	Lincolnshire	53.24°N 00.23°W	TF1873
Mintlaw	Aberdeenshire	57.52°N 02.00°W	NK0048
Mintlaw Station	Aberdeenshire	57.52°N 02.03°W	NJ9848
Minto	Scottish Borders	55.47°N 02.69°W	NT5620
Minto Kames	Scottish Borders	55.49°N 02.71°W	NT5522
Minton	Shropshire	52.50°N 02.84°W	SO4390
Mintsfeet	Cumbria	54.33°N 02.75°W	SD5194
Minwear	Pembrokeshire	51.78°N 04.85°W	SN0313
Minworth	Birmingham	52.52°N 01.78°W	SP1592
Mirbister	Orkney Islands	59.05°N 03.22°W	HY3019
Mirehouse	Cumbria	54.52°N 03.57°W	NX9815
Mirfield	Kirklees	53.67°N 01.69°W	SE2020
Miserden	Gloucestershire	51.77°N 02.10°W	SO9308
Misery Corner	Norfolk	52.45°N 01.32°E	TM2689
Miskin (Mountain Ash)	Rhondda Cynon Taf	51.67°N 03.38°W	ST0498
Miskin (Pontyclun)	Rhondda Cynon Taf	51.51°N 03.38°W	ST0480
Misselfore	Wiltshire	50.99°N 01.98°W	SU0122
Misson	Nottinghamshire	53.43°N 00.97°W	SK6894
Misterton	Leicestershire	52.44°N 01.19°W	SP5583
Misterton	Nottinghamshire	53.43°N 00.85°W	SK7694
Misterton	Somerset	50.86°N 02.78°W	ST4508
Misterton Soss	Nottinghamshire	53.44°N 00.84°W	SK7795
Mistley	Essex	51.93°N 01.06°E	TM1131
Mistley Heath	Essex	51.92°N 01.08°E	TM1230
Mitcham	Merton	51.39°N 00.16°W	TQ2868
Mitcheldean	Gloucestershire	51.85°N 02.49°W	SO6618
Mitchell	Cornwall	50.34°N 05.00°W	SW8654
Mitchell Hill	Scottish Borders	55.58°N 03.49°W	NT0633
Mitchelston	Scottish Borders	55.72°N 02.86°W	NT4648
Mitchel Troy	Monmouthshire	51.78°N 02.74°W	SO4910
Mite Houses	Cumbria	54.36°N 03.41°W	SD0897
Mitford	Northumberland	55.16°N 01.73°W	NZ1786
Mithian	Cornwall	50.30°N 05.17°W	SW7450
Mithian Downs	Cornwall	50.29°N 05.17°W	SW7449
Mitton	Gloucestershire	51.99°N 02.14°W	SO9033
Mitton	Staffordshire	52.73°N 02.17°W	SJ8815
Mixbury	Oxfordshire	51.99°N 01.12°W	SP6033
Mixenden	Calderdale	53.74°N 01.91°W	SE0628
Mixtow	Cornwall	50.34°N 04.64°W	SX1253
