= List of United Kingdom locations: Cw-Cz =

The United Kingdom

This is part of the list of United Kingdom locations: a gazetteer of place names in the United Kingdom showing each place's locality and geographical coordinates.

== Cw ==
Location	Locality	Coordinates (links to map & photo sources)	OS grid reference
Cwm	Shropshire	52.40°N 02.98°W	SO3379
Cwm	Blaenau Gwent	51.73°N 03.18°W	SO1805
Cwm	Neath Port Talbot	51.63°N 03.73°W	SS8094
Cwm	Denbighshire	53.28°N 03.41°W	SJ0677
Cwmafan	Neath Port Talbot	51.61°N 03.76°W	SS7892
Cwmaman	Rhondda, Cynon, Taff	51.68°N 03.44°W	ST0099
Cwmann	Carmarthenshire	52.10°N 04.07°W	SN5847
Cwmavon	Torfaen	51.74°N 03.05°W	SO2706
Cwmbach	Powys	52.04°N 03.22°W	SO1639
Cwmbach	Carmarthenshire	51.89°N 04.54°W	SN2525
Cwmbach	Rhondda, Cynon, Taff	51.69°N 03.41°W	SO0201
Cwmbach Llechrhyd	Powys	52.17°N 03.43°W	SO0254
Cwmbelan	Powys	52.41°N 03.56°W	SN9481
Cwmbran	Torfaen	51.64°N 03.02°W	ST2995
Cwmbrwyno	Ceredigion	52.40°N 03.91°W	SN7080
Cwm Capel	Carmarthenshire	51.69°N 04.24°W	SN4502
Cwmcarn	Caerphilly	51.63°N 03.14°W	ST2193
Cwmcarvan	Monmouthshire	51.75°N 02.76°W	SO4707
Cwm-celyn	Blaenau Gwent	51.76°N 03.16°W	SO2008
Cwmcerdinen	Swansea	51.74°N 03.98°W	SN6307
Cwm-Cewydd	Gwynedd	52.70°N 03.67°W	SH8713
Cwmcoednerth	Ceredigion	52.10°N 04.42°W	SN3448
Cwm-cou	Carmarthenshire	52.04°N 04.49°W	SN2941
Cwmcrawnon	Powys	51.86°N 03.25°W	SO1419
Cwmcych	Pembrokeshire	51.98°N 04.52°W	SN2735
Cwmdare	Rhondda, Cynon, Taff	51.71°N 03.47°W	SN9803
Cwm Dows	Caerphilly	51.65°N 03.15°W	ST2096
Cwmdu	Carmarthenshire	51.95°N 03.99°W	SN6330
Cwmdu	Powys	51.89°N 03.19°W	SO1823
Cwmdu	Swansea	51.62°N 03.96°W	SS6494
Cwmduad	Carmarthenshire	51.95°N 04.37°W	SN3731
Cwm Dulais	Swansea	51.70°N 04.01°W	SN6103
Cwmdwr	Carmarthenshire	51.97°N 03.89°W	SN7032
Cwmerfyn	Ceredigion	52.42°N 03.92°W	SN6982
Cwmfelin	Merthyr Tydfil	51.69°N 03.31°W	SO0900
Cwmfelin	Bridgend	51.58°N 03.64°W	SS8689
Cwmfelin Boeth	Carmarthenshire	51.84°N 04.62°W	SN1919
Cwmfelinfach	Caerphilly	51.61°N 03.18°W	ST1891
Cwmfelin Mynach	Carmarthenshire	51.88°N 04.58°W	SN2224
Cwmffrwd	Carmarthenshire	51.82°N 04.29°W	SN4217
Cwm Ffrwd-oer	Torfaen	51.70°N 03.07°W	SO2601
Cwm-Fields	Torfaen	51.69°N 03.04°W	SO2800
Cwm Gelli	Caerphilly	51.67°N 03.20°W	ST1798
Cwmgiedd	Powys	51.78°N 03.77°W	SN7811
Cwmgors	Carmarthenshire	51.77°N 03.88°W	SN7010
Cwmgwili	Carmarthenshire	51.77°N 04.07°W	SN5710
Cwmgwrach	Neath Port Talbot	51.72°N 03.65°W	SN8604
Cwm Gwyn	Swansea	51.61°N 03.98°W	SS6393
Cwm Head	Shropshire	52.48°N 02.85°W	SO4288
Cwmhiraeth	Carmarthenshire	52.00°N 04.42°W	SN3437
Cwm-hwnt	Rhondda, Cynon, Taff	51.73°N 03.57°W	SN9105
Cwmifor	Carmarthenshire	51.90°N 03.96°W	SN6525
Cwm Irfon	Powys	52.12°N 03.68°W	SN8549
Cwmisfael	Carmarthenshire	51.81°N 04.19°W	SN4915
Cwm-Llinau	Powys	52.64°N 03.71°W	SH8407
Cwmllynfell	Neath Port Talbot	51.79°N 03.82°W	SN7412
Cwm-mawr	Carmarthenshire	51.78°N 04.13°W	SN5312
Cwm-miles	Carmarthenshire	51.86°N 04.67°W	SN1622
Cwm Nant-gam	Blaenau Gwent	51.80°N 03.16°W	SO2012
Cwmnantyrodyn	Caerphilly	51.64°N 03.18°W	ST1895
Cwmorgan	Pembrokeshire	51.97°N 04.49°W	SN2934
Cwmparc	Rhondda, Cynon, Taff	51.65°N 03.51°W	SS9596
Cwmpengraig	Carmarthenshire	51.99°N 04.41°W	SN3436
Cwm Penmachno	Conwy	53.00°N 03.86°W	SH7547
Cwmpennar	Rhondda, Cynon, Taff	51.69°N 03.40°W	SO0300
Cwm Plysgog	Pembrokeshire	52.05°N 04.64°W	SN1943
Cwmrhos	Powys	51.90°N 03.19°W	SO1824
Cwmrhydyceirw	Swansea	51.67°N 03.93°W	SS6699
Cwmsyfiog	Caerphilly	51.71°N 03.23°W	SO1502
Cwmsymlog	Ceredigion	52.42°N 03.91°W	SN7083
Cwmtillery	Blaenau Gwent	51.73°N 03.14°W	SO2105
Cwm-twrch Isaf	Neath Port Talbot	51.77°N 03.79°W	SN7610
Cwm-twrch Uchaf	Neath Port Talbot	51.78°N 03.81°W	SN7511
Cwmwdig Water	Pembrokeshire	51.92°N 05.20°W	SM8030
Cwmwysg	Powys	51.93°N 03.67°W	SN8528
Cwm-y-glo	Gwynedd	53.13°N 04.16°W	SH5562
Cwmynyscoy	Torfaen	51.68°N 03.04°W	ST2899
Cwmyoy	Monmouthshire	51.90°N 03.03°W	SO2923
Cwmystwyth	Ceredigion	52.35°N 03.79°W	SN7874
Cwrt	Gwynedd	52.58°N 03.94°W	SH6800
Cwrtnewydd	Ceredigion	52.10°N 04.22°W	SN4847
Cwrt-y-cadno	Carmarthenshire	52.07°N 03.91°W	SN6944

== Cy ==
Location	Locality	Coordinates (links to map & photo sources)	OS grid reference
Cydweli (Kidwelly)	Carmarthenshire	51.73°N 04.31°W	SN4006
Cyffylliog	Denbighshire	53.10°N 03.42°W	SJ0557
Cymau	Flintshire	53.09°N 03.06°W	SJ2956
Cymdda	Bridgend	51.53°N 03.58°W	SS9083
Cymer or Cymmer	Neath Port Talbot	51.65°N 03.64°W	SS8696
Cymmer	Rhondda, Cynon, Taff	51.60°N 03.41°W	ST0290
Cyncoed	Cardiff	51.51°N 03.18°W	ST1880
Cynheidre	Carmarthenshire	51.74°N 04.18°W	SN4907
Cynonville	Neath Port Talbot	51.64°N 03.70°W	SS8295
Cyntwell	Cardiff	51.46°N 03.26°W	ST1275
Cynwyd	Denbighshire	52.95°N 03.41°W	SJ0541
Cynwyl Elfed	Carmarthenshire	51.91°N 04.37°W	SN3727
