= A485 road =

Road in Wales

Coordinates: 52.13035°N 4.07378°W

A485

Major junctions
- North end: Llanfarian
- A40 A484 A482 A475 A487
- South end: Tanerdy

Location
- Country: United Kingdom
- Constituent country: Wales
- Primary destinations: Aberystwyth; Carmarthen

Road network
- Roads in the United Kingdom; Motorways; A and B road zones

The A485 is an A road linking Tanerdy near Carmarthen to Llanfarian near Aberystwyth in Wales.

Settlements along the route include:

- Tanerdy
- Peniel
- Rhydargaeau
- Pontarsais
- Alltwalis
- Gwyddgrug
- New Inn
- Gwndwn
- Llanllwni
- Aber-giar
- Llanybydder
- Pencarreg
- Lampeter
- Llangybi
- Tregaron
- Bronant
- Ffoshelyg
- Lledrod
- Llanilar
- Llanfarian

== Sources ==
- Google Maps UK
