= Richard William Dafydd =

18th century Welsh Methodist

Richard William Dafydd was an 18th-century Welsh Methodist exhorter. He was brother of David Williams of Lisworney (Methodist exhorter, and later Independent minister). He is known to have been exhorting from the early 1740s, and in 1744 to have been appointed visitor to the societies at Gorseinon and Pembrey. He is also associated with Llandyfaelog (where he met Thomas William (1717–1765) in 1747), and thought later to have settled in the Swansea area.
