= 1894 Llandeilo Rural District Council election =

Welsh local election

The first election to the Llandeilo Rural District Council was held in December 1894. It was followed by the 1898 election. The successful candidates were also elected to the Llandeilo Board of Guardians.

== Ward results ==
=== Brechfa (one seat) ===
Brechfa 1894
Party	Candidate	Votes	%	±%
Independent	David Morgans	Unopposed		
Independent win (new seat)				

=== Glynamman (two seats) ===
Glynamman 1894
Party	Candidate	Votes	%	±%
Independent	David William Lewis	Unopposed		
Independent	William Lewis	Unopposed		
Independent win (new seat)				
Independent win (new seat)				

=== Llandebie (four seats) ===
Llandebie 1894
Party	Candidate	Votes	%	±%
Independent	David Davies	Unopposed		
Independent	Henry Herbert	Unopposed		
Independent	John Jones	Unopposed		
Independent	William Jones	Unopposed		
Independent win (new seat)				
Independent win (new seat)				
Independent win (new seat)				
Independent win (new seat)				

=== Llandeilo Fawr North Ward (three seats) ===
Llandeilo Fawr North Ward 1894
Party	Candidate	Votes	%	±%
Independent	W. Griffiths	204		
Independent	Joseph Harries	198		
Independent	David Watkins	186		
Independent	John Perkins	165		
Independent	John Morgan	135		
Independent win (new seat)				
Independent win (new seat)				

=== Llandeilo Fawr South Ward (two seats) ===
Llandeilo Fawr South Ward 1894
Party	Candidate	Votes	%	±%
Independent	Willam Jones	126		
Independent	Caleb Thomas	80		
Independent	J.G. Williams	73		
Independent	J.L. Thomas	55		
Independent	Thomas Thomas	53		
Independent	S. Thomas	45		
Independent win (new seat)				
Independent win (new seat)				

=== Llandyfeisant (one seat) ===
Llandyfeisant 1894
Party	Candidate	Votes	%	±%
Independent	John Thomas	Unopposed		
Independent win (new seat)				

=== Llanegwad (three seats) ===
Llanegwad 1894
Party	Candidate	Votes	%	±%
Independent	Col. Gwynne Hughes	209		
Independent	Henry Jones Davies	170		
Independent	John Thomas	154		
Independent	W. Evans	124		
Independent	W. Davies	36		
Independent win (new seat)				
Independent win (new seat)				
Independent win (new seat)				

=== Llanfihangel Aberbythych (two seats) ===
Llanfihangel Aberbythych 1894
Party	Candidate	Votes	%	±%
Independent	John Griffiths	Unopposed		
Independent	Roderick Jones	Unopposed		
Independent win (new seat)				
Independent win (new seat)				

=== Llanfihangel Cilfragen (one seat) ===
Llanfihangel Cilfragen 1894
Party	Candidate	Votes	%	±%
Independent	Thomas Evans	Unopposed		
Independent win (new seat)				

=== Llanfynydd (one seat) ===
Llanfynydd 1894
Party	Candidate	Votes	%	±%
Independent	John Jones	Unopposed		
Independent win (new seat)				

=== Llangathen (two seats) ===
Llangathen 1894
Party	Candidate	Votes	%	±%
Independent	William Lewis	79		
Independent	W. Rees Thomas	77		
Independent	David Lewis	62		
Independent	J.F. James	14		
Independent win (new seat)				
Independent win (new seat)				

=== Llansawel (two seats) ===
Llansawel 1894
Party	Candidate	Votes	%	±%
Independent	T. Davies	97		
Independent	D. Jones	92		
Independent	J.M. Davies	87		
Independent	David Davies	10		
Independent win (new seat)				
Independent win (new seat)				

=== Quarter Bach (one seat) ===
Quarter Bach 1894
Party	Candidate	Votes	%	±%
Independent	John Harries	Unopposed		
Independent win (new seat)				

=== Talley (two seats) ===
Talley 1894
Party	Candidate	Votes	%	±%
Independent	Thomas Rees	83		
Independent	John Thomas	74		
Independent	William Williams	51		
Independent win (new seat)				
Independent win (new seat)				
