= Capel Dewi =

Capel Dewi may refer to the following places in Wales:

- Capel Dewi, Faenor, a hamlet near Aberystwyth, Ceredigion
- Capel Dewi, Carmarthenshire, a village in the community of Llanarthney, Carmarthenshire
- Capel Dewi, Llandysul, a village in the community of Llandysul, Ceredigion
