= Milton Green (disambiguation) =

Milton Green may refer to:

- Milton Green (1913–2005), an American Jewish sportsperson
- Milton Green, Cheshire, a hamlet in Cheshire, England
- Milton Green, Devon, a hamlet in Devon, England

== See also ==
- Milton Greene
