= David Lewis (Anglican priest, born 1760) =

Welsh priest (1760–1850)

David Lewis (1760 – 28 July 1850) was a Welsh Anglican priest and writer.

== Life ==
Lewis was born in 1760 in Abergwili, Carmarthenshire, and studied in Llanpumpsaint and at the Presbyterian Academy in Carmarthen, Carmarthenshire. He then matriculated at Jesus College, Oxford but there is no record of him obtaining a degree. He was ordained in 1785, and taught in Oswestry, Shropshire where he was also the curate, before moving to Abernant, Carmarthenshire in 1787 (adding the parish of Cynwyl Elfed later in the same year). He also became rector of Garthbeibio, Montgomeryshire in 1794, and continued to serve these three parishes until his death. In addition to serving as a magistrate for Carmarthenshire, he supported the eisteddfodau held in the county. His translation of a book on the catechism was published. He died on 28 July 1850, and was buried in Abernant.
