= Abergwili railway station =

Disused railway station in Carmarthenshire, Wales

Coordinates: 51.86614°N 4.26711°W

Abergwili
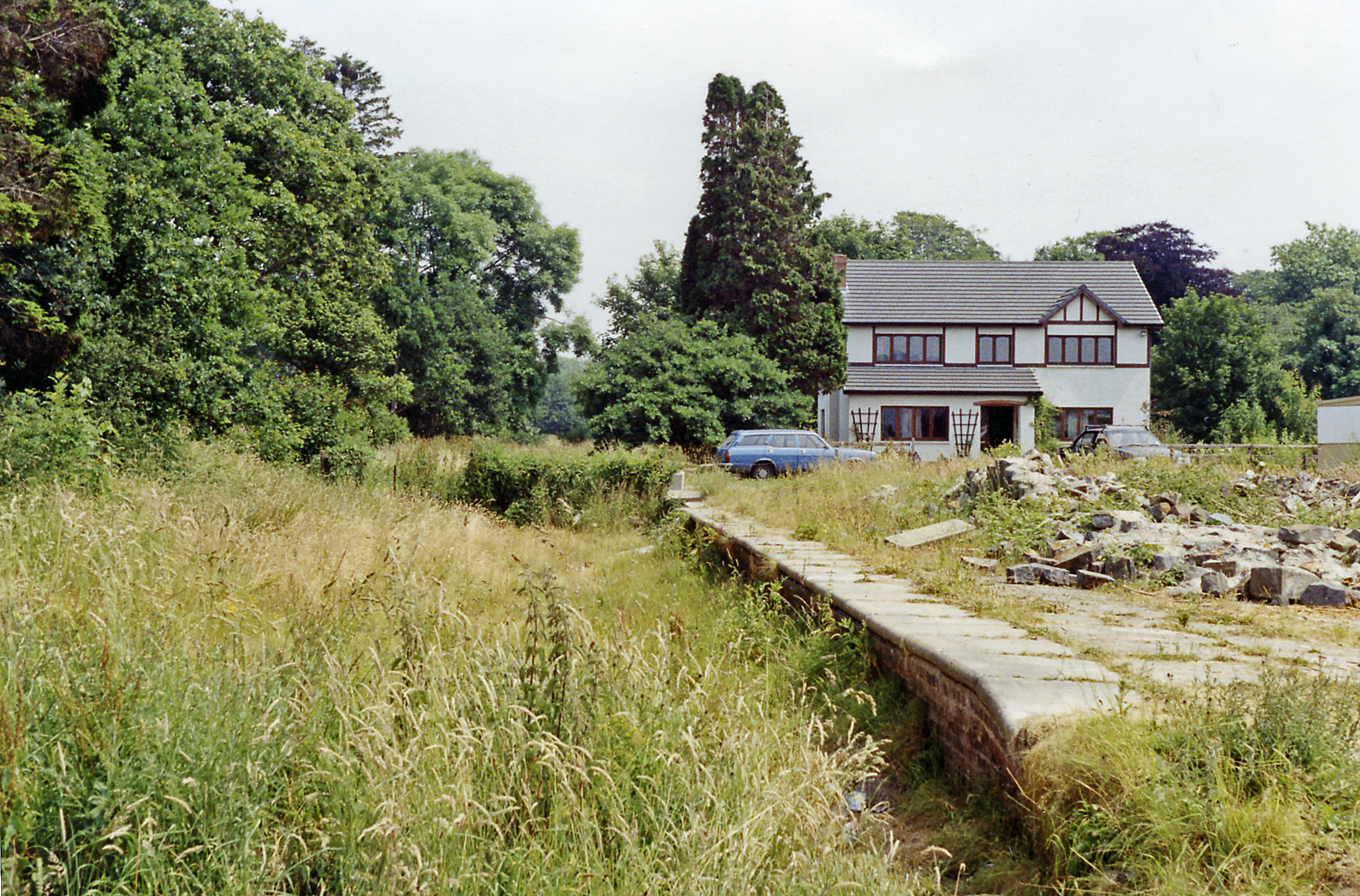
- Abergwili station remains (1992)

General information
- Location: Abergwili, Carmarthenshire; Wales
- Platforms: 1

Other information
- Status: Disused

History
- Opened: 1 June 1865 (as Abergwilli)
- Closed: 9 September 1963
- Original company: Llanelly Railway
- Pre-grouping: London and North Western Railway
- Post-grouping: London, Midland and Scottish Railway

Key dates
- April to June 1880: Station closes
- 28 July 1893: Renamed Abergwili
Location

Abergwili railway station served the village of Abergwili in Wales. It was the first station after Gwili Junction, the point where the line through it divided from the Carmarthen to Aberystwyth Line.

== History ==
Opened by the Llanelly Railway, the station was absorbed into the London and North Western Railway as part of its ownership of the Central Wales Line. Becoming part of the London, Midland and Scottish Railway during the Grouping of 1923, it passed on to the London Midland Region of British Railways on nationalisation in 1948. Later transferred to the Western Region of British Railways, it was closed by the British Railways Board.

== Site today ==
The station site remained undeveloped after closure and the platform survived until 1999 when the trackbed was used for the upgrading of the A40 trunk road as part of Carmarthen's eastern bypass. Nothing now remains as the trackbed has been subsumed beneath the new road scheme.

Preceding station	Disused railways	Following station
Carmarthen Town	London and North Western Railway; Llanelly Railway	Whitemill
