= Abergwili =

Village and community in Carmarthenshire, Wales

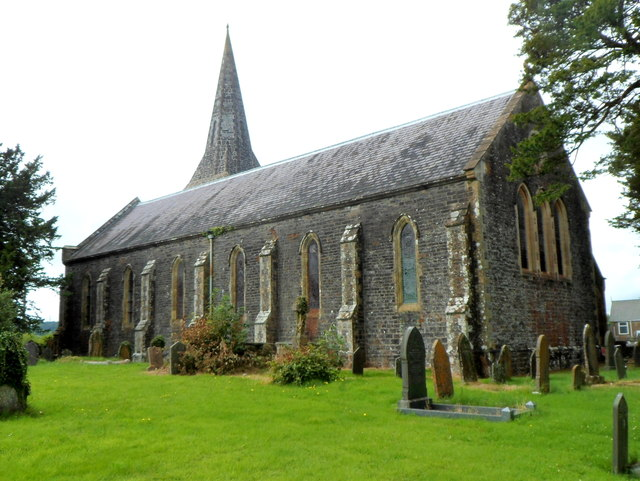
- St Davids Church

- Location within Carmarthenshire
- Population: 1,612
- OS grid reference: SN438210
- Community: Abergwili
- Principal area: Carmarthenshire
- Preserved county: Dyfed
- Country: Wales
- Sovereign state: United Kingdom
- Post town: Carmarthen
- Postcode district: SA32
- Dialling code: 01267
- Police: Dyfed-Powys
- Fire: Mid and West Wales
- Ambulance: Welsh
- UK Parliament: Caerfyrddin
- Senedd Cymru – Welsh Parliament: Carmarthen East and Dinefwr
- List of places UK Wales Carmarthenshire 51.866°N 4.269°W Map of the community

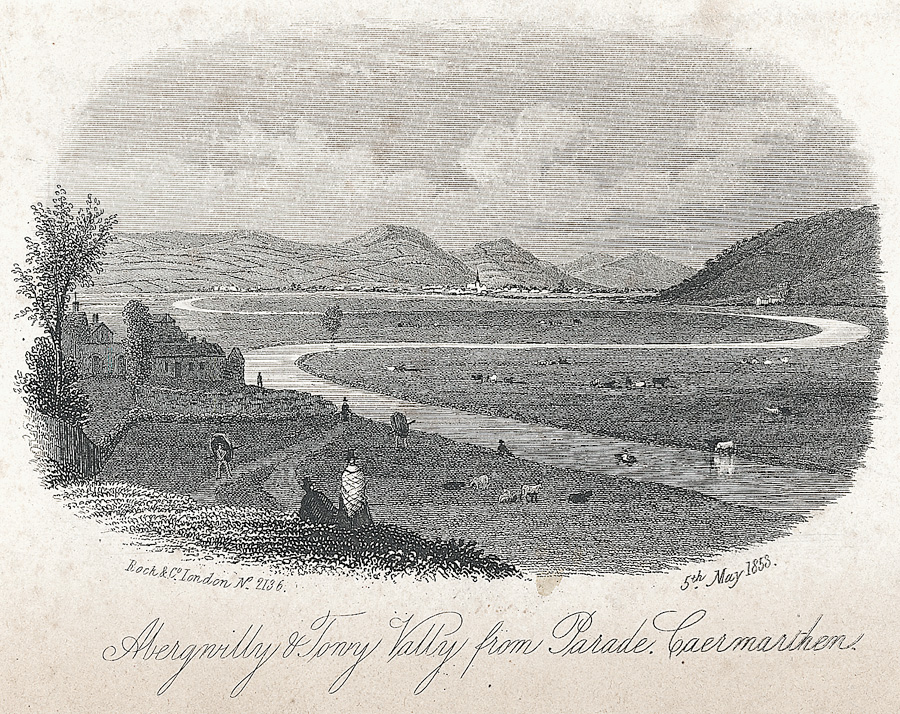
1853 drawing of the village from Parade, Carmarthen

Abergwili (Welsh pronunciation) is a village and community in Carmarthenshire, Wales, near the confluence of the rivers Towy and Gwili, close to the town of Carmarthen. It is also an electoral ward. Named after the village of Abergwili, the community includes the settlements of Peniel, Llanfihangel-uwch-Gwili and White Mill. The grounds of the former Bishop's Palace are listed on the Cadw/ICOMOS Register of Parks and Gardens of Special Historic Interest in Wales.

== Bishop's Palace ==
The village is known for its Bishop's Palace, home to the Bishop of St David's since 1542, when Bishop William Barlow transferred his palace from St David's to Abergwili, re-using the premises of an older college of priests. The building is believed to have been built between 1283 and 1291, when Thomas Bek was made bishop of St Davids. It was known as a college until it was amalgamated with another to create Christ College in Brecon. It was almost completely rebuilt in 1903 following a disastrous fire. It contains the chapel originally added by Archbishop Laud in 1625, when he was Bishop of St David's. In 1974 the old episcopal palace was purchased by Carmarthenshire County Council for use as a museum, whilst a new residence for the bishops, "Llys Esgob", was built in part of the grounds, together with Diocesan Offices - thereby continuing a connection with Abergwili which has now lasted for well over 400 years.

Until 1802 the river Towy ran past the back of the Palace; it changed course and left an oxbow lake. Today it is a large lily pond with large amounts of wildlife. The park is registered at Grade II on the Cadw/ICOMOS Register of Parks and Gardens of Special Historic Interest in Wales.

== Amenities ==
Abergwili has seen a substantial increase in population in recent years with new property developments but has kept its character and rural tranquility. The Celtic cross war memorial was built in memory of those from the village who died in the two world wars. Abergwili has a bilingual primary school in the centre.

The village is home to the Carmarthen Quins rugby union team. Merlin's Hill Centre is a farm which has been opened up to the public. Merlin's Hill is next to the farm. There is a footpath that goes to the top of the hill, which is the site of an Iron Age hillfort. Merlin's Hill is down in local legend as the final resting place of Merlin from the Arthurian legend. The "Wheat Sheaf" pub in the village is one of the oldest pubs in Carmarthenshire. Around 1850 there was also a pub called the "Albion Inn".

It has a hospital, Glangwili General Hospital, and heritage railway, Gwili Railway. It once had a railway station.

== Religious history ==
There are two places of Christian worship in the village of Abergwili: Ebeneser Chapel, a Welsh Nonconformist Independent Chapel, and St David's, a Church in Wales parish church. St David's was rebuilt in the early 1840s when the Rev. Joshua Hughes was vicar, on the foundations of a much earlier church. The new church was consecrated in 1843. The cost was £1,400, and Hughes was later to become Bishop of St Asaph. Richard Davies was buried at this church.

The parish of Abergwili also includes a number of other places of worship, including the church at Llanfihangel uwch Gwili and the Independent (Congregationalist) chapel at Peniel.

== Local government ==
Abergwili is an electoral ward for the purposes of elections to Carmarthenshire County Council. From 1995 until 2017, the ward was represented by Independent councillor Pam Palmer. Abergwili also has a community council. It was won by Plaid Cymru candidate Dorian Williams in 2017, who was succeeded by Neil Lewis in 2022.

The community is bordered by the communities of: Llanllawddog; Llanegwad; Llanarthney; Llangunnor; Carmarthen; and Bronwydd, all being in Carmarthenshire.

== Notable people ==
- David Lewis (1760–1850), Welsh Anglican priest and writer
- Basil Jones (1822–1897), Welsh bishop and scholar, Bishop of St David's from 1874, died in Abergwili
- John Owen (1854–1926), professor of Welsh, Dean of St Asaph and Bishop of St David's from 1897; died in Abergwili
- Alice Abadam (1856–1940), Welsh suffragette, feminist and public speaker; died in Abergwili
- Alfred Pullin (1860–1934), British sports journalist who wrote about rugby union and cricket
