= Esther Lewis (missionary) =

Welsh missionary (1887–1958)

- Born: Esther Evans; 1887; Efail-y-Banc, Rhydargaeau, Carmarthenshire, Wales
- Died: 4 November 1958 (aged 70–71); Carmarthen
- Other name: Hetty Evans
- Occupation: Christian missionary

Esther Lewis (1887 – 4 November 1958), born Esther Evans, was a Welsh educator and Presbyterian missionary in India and Bangladesh.

== Early life ==
Esther (or Hetty) Evans was born in Efail-y-Banc, Rhydargaeau, Carmarthenshire, Wales, 1887. Her father was a blacksmith. She trained as a teacher in Carmarthen, and taught at Penygroes School near Ammanford before she was called to mission work in 1914.

== Career ==
Evans served as a Presbyterian missionary at Sonapur and Karimganj in Assam, India. She was a teacher to women living in zenana. In 1925, she was appointed headmistress of the school at Karimganj, succeeding Dilys Edmunds. When the school was closed in 1935, she continued in Karimganj as a missionary, working with Jane Helen Rowlands to run Dipti Nibash, a refuge home for widows and orphans.

In widowhood in the 1940s, she volunteered again for mission work, and taught women in Sylhet.

== Personal life ==
Hetty Evans married David John Lewis in early 1945, in Cymer Afan, while she was on furlough in Wales. She was widowed eight months later, when Lewis died. She died in 1958, in Wales, aged 71 years.
