= Daniel Rees (priest) =

British hymnwriter (1793–1857)

Daniel Rees (8 February 1793 – 13 June 1857) was a Welsh clergyman and hymnwriter.

Rees was born at Felin Newydd, Llangeler in Carmarthenshire, Wales, on 8 February 1793. He went to Castellhywel school before attending Jesus College, Oxford. After being ordained, he was curate of Goetre, Monmouthshire, from 1818 to 1823, before becoming perpetual curate of Aberystruth, Monmouthshire. His publications included Casgliad o Psalmau a Hymnau in 1831, and A Selection of Psalms and Hymns in 1832; the popularity of both books was demonstrated by the fact that each book was reprinted on several occasions in the following 30 years. The books included some of Rees's original hymns and translations. He died on 13 June 1857.
