= Rhydargaeau =

Village in Carmarthenshire, Wales

Coordinates: 51.9133°N 4.2719°W

Rhydargaeau: Welsh: Rhydargaeau
- Location within Carmarthenshire
- Community: Llanllawddog
- Principal area: Carmarthenshire
- Preserved county: Dyfed
- Country: Wales
- Sovereign state: United Kingdom
- Post town: Carmarthen
- Postcode district: SA32
- Police: Dyfed-Powys
- Fire: Mid and West Wales
- Ambulance: Welsh
- UK Parliament: Caerfyrddin
- Senedd Cymru – Welsh Parliament: Carmarthen East and Dinefwr

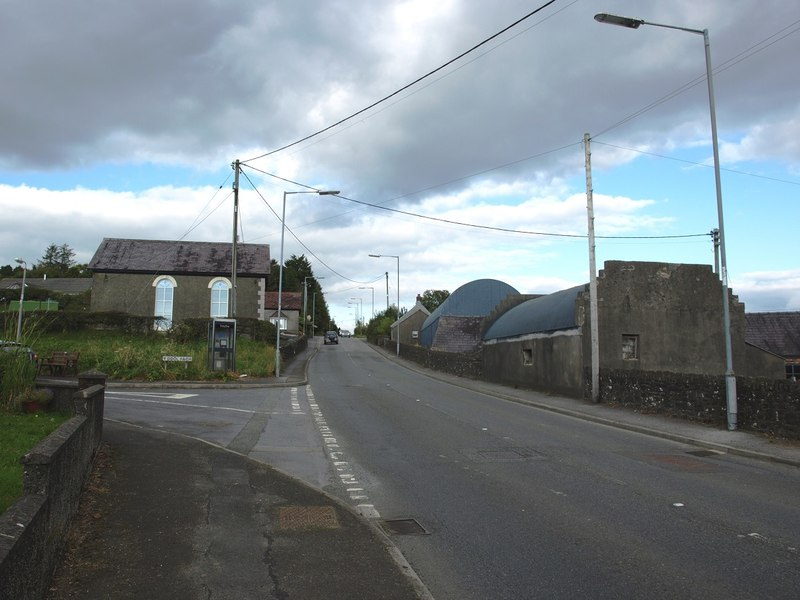
The A485 road in Rhydargaeau

Rhydargaeau is a village in Carmarthenshire, Wales. It lies along the A485 road which connects it to Pontarsais in the north and Peniel and Carmarthen, 3.8 miles (6.1 km) to the south. The village is located in the community of Llanllawddog. The village featured in the Welsh television series Pen Talar by S4C. The village pub is the Bluebell and Rhydargaeau also contains a Baptist church and Upper Llawddog Pump House.

== Notable people ==
- Esther Lewis (1887–1958), missionary
