= Cilsân =

Hamlet in Carmarthenshire, Wales

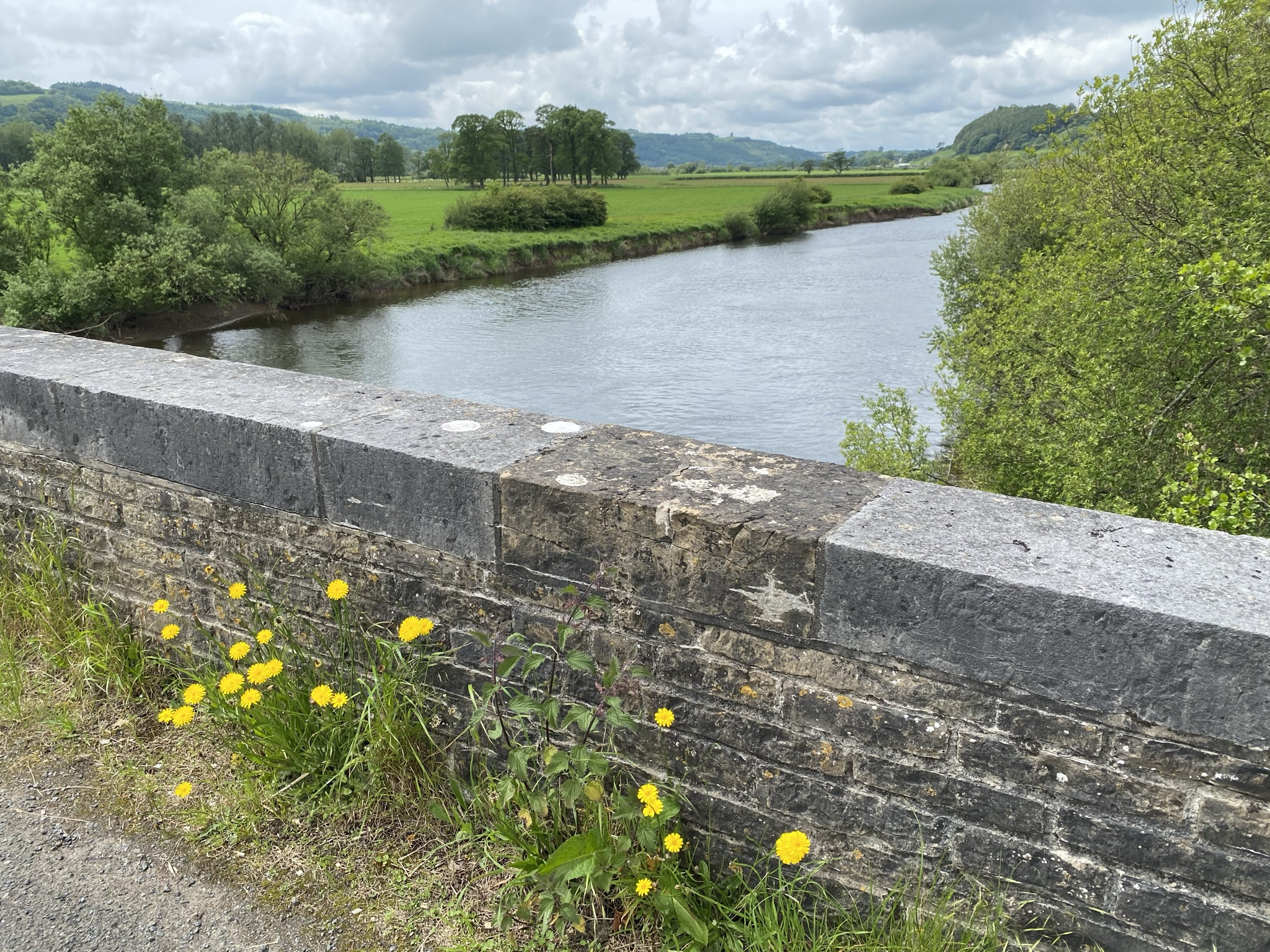
- Pont Cilsân

- Location within Carmarthenshire
- Community: Llangathen
- Principal area: Carmarthenshire
- Preserved county: Dyfed
- Country: Wales
- Sovereign state: United Kingdom
- Post town: Carmarthen
- Postcode district: SA19
- Police: Dyfed-Powys
- Fire: Mid and West Wales
- Ambulance: Welsh
- UK Parliament: Caerfyrddin
- Senedd Cymru – Welsh Parliament: Carmarthen West and South Pembrokeshire
- List of places UK Wales Carmarthenshire 51.880252°N 4.042095°W Map of the community

Cilsân is a hamlet in the community of Llangathen in the county of Carmarthenshire, Wales, situated about two miles west of Llandeilo on the north side of the River Tywi.

== Etymology ==
The first element of the name Cilsân is Welsh cil meaning 'nook'. The second is less clear. It may be an unrecorded personal name *Sân or alternatively sân, the local form of saen, borrowed from the English seine, a type of fishing net.

The spelling Cilsân is the preferred standard form in both English and Welsh by the Welsh Language Commissioner. Other spellings include the anglicised Kilsane and Cilsane, the latter of which is still used, including on postal addresses held by the Royal Mail, and by a local lodge operator. These contain a final silent e that indicates that the preceding vowel is long.

== Pont Cilsân ==
Pont Cilsân ('Cilsân bridge') is located on the River Tywi a short distance to the south-west, at the site of a former ferry. It is a Grade II-listed high-arched stone bridge of three spans that carries the road from Golden Grove to Llangathen. It was probably built c.1865.
