= John Harris Jones =

Welsh Methodist minister (1827–1885)

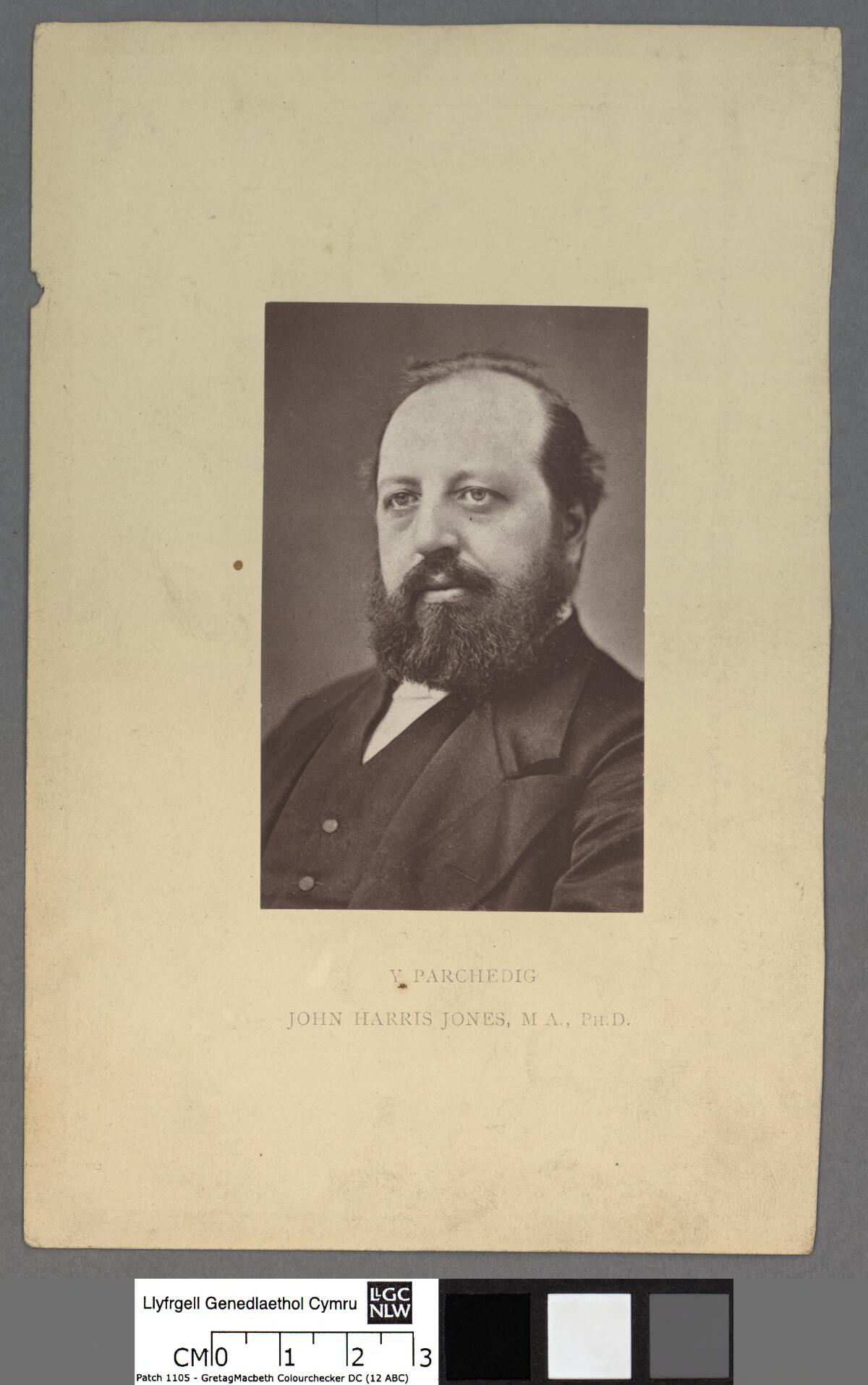
- Born: 28 August 1827; Llangeler, Wales, United Kingdom
- Died: 21 July 1885 (aged 57); Southport, Merseyside, United Kingdom

John Harris Jones (28 August 1827 – 21 July 1885) was a Calvinistic Methodist minister and classical tutor at Trevecca College.

== Personal life ==
Jones was born to John and Elizabeth Jones at Waunwthan in Llangeler, Carmarthenshire. At the age of two, he and his family moved to his mother's old home in Pen-y-banc. He died at Southport in 1885 and is buried at Clos-Y-Graig.

== Education ==
Jones went to Saron Chapel at an independent school. At the age of 12, he transferred to a grammar school in Newcastle Emlyn run by Unitarian minister John Davies. He spent a year at the Carmarthen Grammar School before joining the Presbyterian Academy in Carmarthen, where he studied for five years. At 17, while still at school, John Harris began preaching. He was the first Welsh Calvinistic Methodist to win the Dr. Williams Scholarship in 1849, after which he then went on to study at the University of Glasgow. In 1852, John Harris Jones completed his graduation with The Lord Jeffreys Gold Medal, acknowledging his academic excellence in Greek. He continued to study, first at Göttingen University and later at the University of Halle for his PhD.

== Career ==
Jones was ordained in 1859 and became a classical tutor at Trevecka College from 1865 to 1885. In 1879, he moderated for the South Wales C.M. Association.

In 1858, Jones translated the portion of Ibn Abd al-Hakam's The Conquest of Egypt and North Africa and Spain (Andalusia) covering only the Muslim conquest of Spain from Arabic.

== See also ==
E. Matthews and J. C. Jones, Cofiant y Parchedig J. Harris Jones, M . A., Ph.D. Trefeca, Llanelli, 1886
