= White Mill, Carmarthenshire =

Village in Carmarthenshire

White Hill Felin-wen
- Village
- A40 at White Mill in 2012
- Interactive map of White Hill
- Coordinates: 51.87066°N 4.233848°W
- Country: Wales
- County: Carmarthenshire
- Community: Abergwili

White Mill (Welsh: Felin-wen) is a small village in Carmarthenshire. It is located approximately 3 miles east of the town of Carmarthen on the A40. The nearest villages are Capel Gwyn, half a mile to the north, and Nantgaredig, about 2 miles to the east. It stands on the north bank of the River Towy. It is in the community of Abergwili and lies 2 miles from Abergwili village.

The village gives its name to the Felin-wen Formation in the Drefach Group.

== White Mill watermill ==
White Mill (Welsh: Felin Wen) is a water-powered corn mill in the village of White Mill. It was designated as a grade II* listed building in 1974.

The mill, and its attached warehouse, is from the early 19th century and retains its original machinery, although the water wheel has been replaced by a diesel engine. It has 3 pairs of stones, including a pair of French burrs. Its water wheel dates from the late 19th century; it was made from cast iron with wrought iron buckets and constructed by S. Kelly of Cardigan.

The building is made from rubble stone and has 2 storeys. It is present on the 1840 Tithe map of the area.
