= Mithian Downs =

Coordinates: 50.303°N 5.169°W

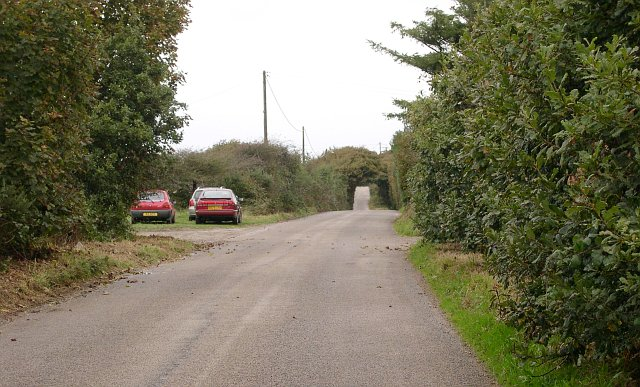
- The road through Mithian Downs

- Location within Cornwall
- OS grid reference: SW744496
- Unitary authority: Cornwall
- Ceremonial county: Cornwall
- Region: South West
- Country: England
- Sovereign state: United Kingdom

Mithian Downs is an area south of Mithian in west Cornwall, England.
