= Parc y Rhos =

Village in Carmarthenshire, Wales

Coordinates: 52.0936°N 4.0775°W

Parc y Rhos is a small village in Carmarthenshire in mid Wales about 2 miles outside of Lampeter. Once a thriving community with a small shop, two pubs, and a falconry centre, it is now largely reduced to a dormitory village for Lampeter. Caersalem Baptist Church was built in 1840.
