= Mingoose =

Hamlet in Cornwall, England

Coordinates: 50.294°N 5.217°W

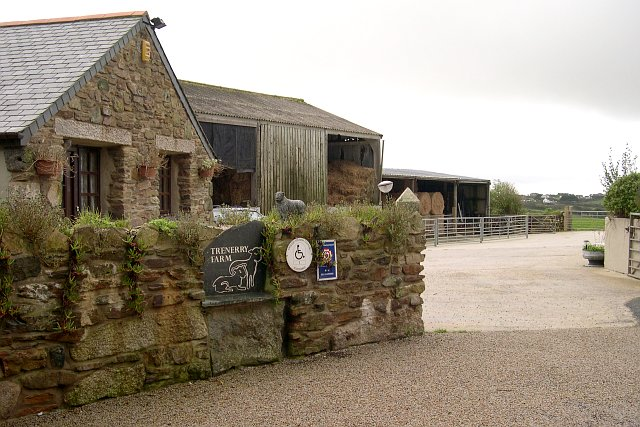
- Trenerry Farm, Mingoose

- Location within Cornwall
- OS grid reference: SW710488
- Civil parish: St Agnes
- Unitary authority: Cornwall
- Ceremonial county: Cornwall
- Region: South West
- Country: England
- Sovereign state: United Kingdom

Mingoose is a hamlet near St Agnes and north of Mount Hawke in Cornwall, England.
