= Cwmhiraeth =

Hamlet in Carmarthenshire, Wales

Coordinates: 52.015°N 4.421°W

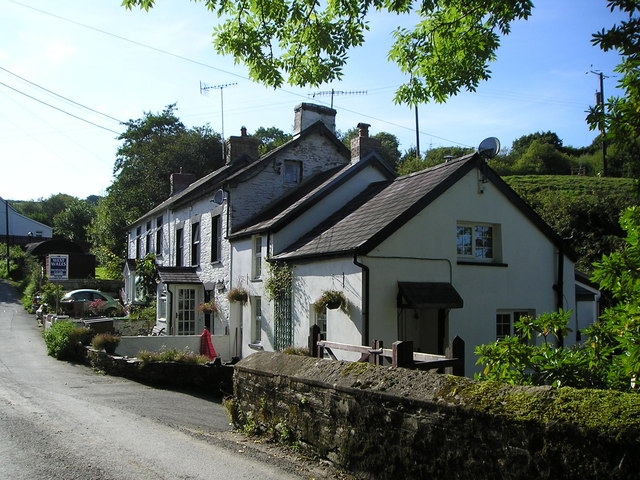
- Cottages by a bridge over the stream

- Location within Carmarthenshire
- Community: Llangeler
- Principal area: Carmarthenshire
- Preserved county: Dyfed
- Country: Wales
- Sovereign state: United Kingdom
- Post town: LLANDYSUL
- Postcode district: SA44
- Police: Dyfed-Powys
- Fire: Mid and West Wales
- Ambulance: Welsh
- UK Parliament: Caerfyrddin
- Senedd Cymru – Welsh Parliament: Carmarthen East and Dinefwr

Cwmhiraeth is a hamlet in Carmarthenshire, Wales, contained in the Dre-fach Felindre district. While the name has no exact meaning in English, it can be roughly translated to "valley of longing". Cwmhiraeth used to be a source of activity for the textile industry, but has since declined.

== History ==
The name Cwmhiraeth is of Welsh origin, cwm translating to 'valley'. Hiraeth does not have a direct translation in English, but roughly translates to 'homesickness' or 'longing'. The hamlet takes its name from Hiraeth, a former common nearby. More recently, the village is known as the "Valley of the Birds".

It is considered likely that Cwmhiraeth was constructed when squatters started building houses illegally. Cwmhiraeth was settled as part of the wool industry, making flannel. Cwmhiraeth saw considerable expansion between 1880 and 1910 with the invention of the power loom. Woollen mills were built in Cwmhiraeth and surrounding hamlets and towns, including Pentrecwrt, Cwmpengraig, and Drefelin. Cwmhiraeth's mill used water power from the Nant Brân stream, which flows through its valley. Some mills could employ fifty to a hundred people. Cwmhiraeth grew to accommodate the new industry in the area, and while more central hamlets like Dre-fach Felindre created shops and churches, Cwmhiraeth mostly served, along with Cwmpengraig, as a secondary settlement to Dre-fach Felindre. Factories, chapels, and housing were constructed. The textile industry in and around Cwmhiraeth produced blankets, shawls, stockings, shirts, and bedcovers, which were sold both locally and internationally. After the textile industry's peak in 1920 and decline throughout the 20th century, Cwmhiraeth also saw its activity decrease, not seeing as much recent development as other hamlets have. The hamlet is developed linearly.

Cwmhiraeth sits on the floor of the surrounding valley. It contains many buildings, including 19th-century cottages and a three-storey mill no longer in use. Some houses and bungalows also appear, many with workshops attached to them, although they are decrepit from disuse. Around the hamlet sit many single dwellings, not connected to any villages. The National Wool Museum now records the history of the area.

Cwmhiraeth, along with Cwmpengraig, was known as the "Huddersfield of Wales".
