= Mineshope =

Coordinates: 50.735°N 4.618°W

- Location within Cornwall
- OS grid reference: SX158961
- Civil parish: St Gennys
- Unitary authority: Cornwall
- Ceremonial county: Cornwall
- Region: South West
- Country: England
- Sovereign state: United Kingdom

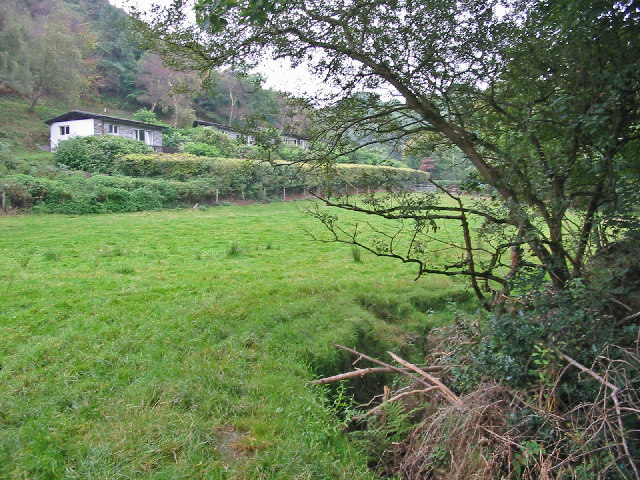
View of Holiday cottages Mineshop, Cornwall, England

Mineshope is a hamlet in the parish of St Gennys, Cornwall, England.
