= Alltwalis Wind Farm =

Wind farm in Wales

- Official name: Blaengwen Wind farm
- Country: Wales, United Kingdom
- Location: near Brechfa Forest, Carmarthenshire
- Coordinates: 51°58′24″N 04°15′03″W
- Status: Operational
- Construction began: November 2008
- Commission date: December 2009
- Owner: Statkraft

Power generation
- Units operational: 10 x Siemens 2.3 MW
- Make and model: Siemens Wind Power
- Nameplate capacity: 23 MW

The Alltwalis Wind Farm is a wind farm near Brechfa Forest located to the north of the town of Carmarthen in Wales.

The facility is composed of 10 wind turbines with a combined installed capacity of 23 megawatts. The expected annual production of electricity is around 65 gigawatt hours (GWh). The farm was built by Statkraft. Construction began in November 2008, and was completed in December 2009.

== Noise pollution ==
Residents of the area have reported severe problems with noise pollution from the wind farm leading to health problems for people living in the area. Criticism has been levelled at Statkraft for not taking the residents' concerns seriously.
