= Tre-Wen =

Village in Ceredigion, Wales

Coordinates: 52.048917°N 4.490946°W

- Location within Ceredigion
- OS grid reference: SN 2929 4188
  - Cardiff: 68.6 mi (110.4 km)
  - London: 190.2 mi (306.1 km)
- Community: Beulah
- Principal area: Ceredigion
- Country: Wales
- Sovereign state: United Kingdom
- Post town: Newcastle Emlyn
- Postcode district: SA38
- Police: Dyfed-Powys
- Fire: Mid and West Wales
- Ambulance: Welsh
- UK Parliament: Ceredigion Preseli
- Senedd Cymru – Welsh Parliament: Ceredigion

Tre-Wen is a small village in the community of Beulah, Ceredigion, Wales, which is 68.6 miles (110.4 km) from Cardiff and 190.2 miles (306.1 km) from London. Tre-Wen is represented in the Senedd by Elin Jones (Plaid Cymru) and is part of the Ceredigion Preseli constituency in the House of Commons.

== See also ==
- List of localities in Wales by population
