= Minnow End =

Hamlet in Essex, England

Coordinates: 51.7905°N 0.4649°E

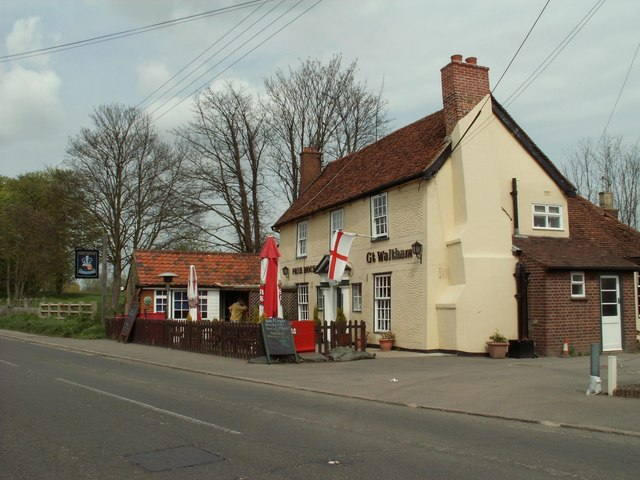
- The Rose and Crown pub

- Location within Essex
- Civil parish: Great Waltham
- District: Chelmsford
- Shire county: Essex
- Region: East
- Country: England
- Sovereign state: United Kingdom
- Police: Essex
- Fire: Essex
- Ambulance: East of England

Minnow End is a hamlet in the civil parish of Great Waltham in Chelmsford district, in the county of Essex, England. Nearby settlements include the town of Chelmsford and the villages of Great Waltham and Little Waltham. For transport there is the B1008 road, the A131 road and the A130 road nearby.
