= Abercrychan =

Village in Carmarthenshire, Wales

Coordinates: 52.0177°N 3.7639°W

Abercrychan is a small village in the north-east of Carmarthenshire. It is located on the A483, 4 miles to the north of the town of Llandovery.

The village is named after the River Crychan, a small stream that flows into the River Brân, near the village. Crychan Forest is on the slopes to the east of Abercrychan.
