= Edwinsford =

Hamlet in Carmarthenshire, Wales

Coordinates: 51.9944°N 3.995°W

Edwinsford (Welsh: Rhydodyn) is a small hamlet situated about the historic Edwinsford Estate and fishery on the river Cothi, a tributary of the River Tywi, in Carmarthenshire, Wales. It lies to the north of Talley, at the confluence of roads toward Llansawel and Crugybar.

The manor house, established in the 1680s by Sir Rice Williams, High Sheriff of Carmarthenshire, is now derelict. There is however an active fishery. The park to the former house is registered at Grade II on the Cadw/ICOMOS Register of Parks and Gardens of Special Historic Interest in Wales.

== See also ==
- List of places in Carmarthenshire
