= Upland Arms =

Village in Carmarthenshire, Wales

Coordinates: 51.796°N 4.305°W

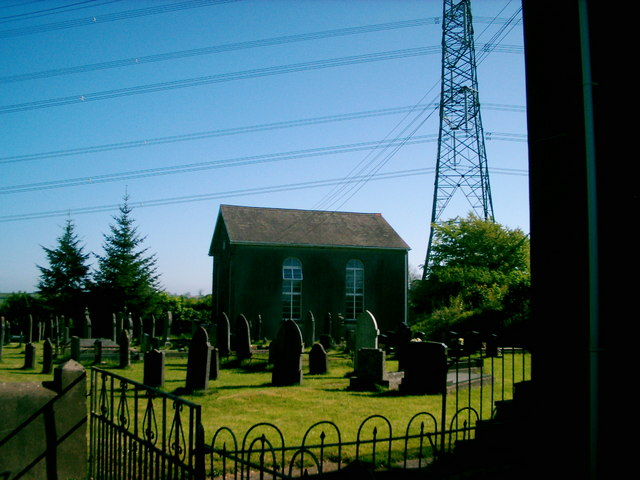
Capel Rama, Upland Arms

Upland Arms is a village located in Carmarthenshire, Wales, based along the A484 running between Carmarthen and Kidwelly. It is situated within the SA32 postcode district.
