= Idole =

Village in Carmarthenshire, Wales

Coordinates: 51.818°N 4.290°W

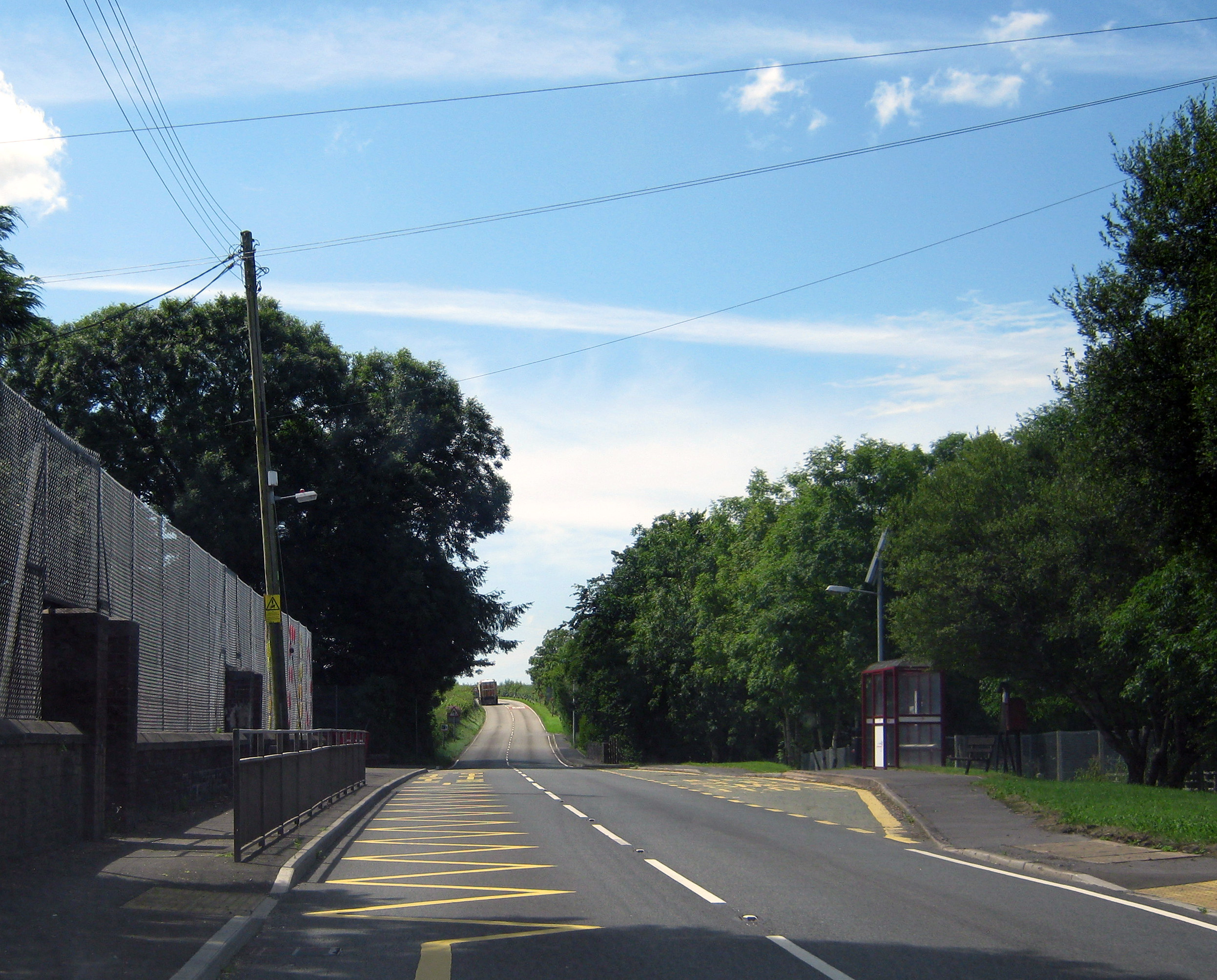
- Road passing the village school at Idole

- Location within Carmarthenshire
- Community: Llandyfaelog
- Principal area: Carmarthenshire
- Preserved county: Dyfed
- Country: Wales
- Sovereign state: United Kingdom
- Post town: Carmarthen
- Postcode district: SA32
- Police: Dyfed-Powys
- Fire: Mid and West Wales
- Ambulance: Welsh
- UK Parliament: Llanelli
- Senedd Cymru – Welsh Parliament: Carmarthen East and Dinefwr

Idole is a village in Carmarthenshire, Wales. Within the village is the Ysgol Y Fro school for juniors.
