= Aberbowlan =

Village in Carmarthenshire, Wales

Coordinates: 52.0336°N 3.9016°W

Aberbowlan is a small village in Carmarthenshire. It is located in the north of the county, 8 miles (13 km) to the north-east of the town of Llandovery on a road that links Hafod Bridge on the A482 and Caio.
