= Llandeilo Rural District =

Welsh local authority (1894–1974)

Llandeilo Rural District was a rural district in east Carmarthenshire, Wales, created in 1935 as a merger of the former Llandilo Fawr Rural District and Llandovery Rural District, both of which had been created in 1894.

Llandeilo Rural District Council was responsible for housing, sanitation and public health and also had some control over roads and water supply.

During the early years of the twentieth century, following a substantial growth in the population of the Welsh anthracite coalfield, two new urban districts were carved out of the Llandilo Fawr Rural District. The Ammanford Urban District was created in 1903 out of parts of the parishes of Betws and Llandybie. In 1912, the Cwmamman Urban District was formed, taking on parts of the parishes of Betws and Llandeilo Fawr.

The Llandilo Fawr Rural District covered the parishes of Betws, Brechfa, Llandeilo Fawr (Rural), Llandybie, Llandyfeisant, Llanegwad, Llanfihangel Aberbythych, Llanfihangel Cilfragen, Llanfynydd, Llansawel, Talley and Quarter Bach.

In 1935 Llandilo Fawr Rural District was merged with Llandovery Rural District, with the new district called the Llandilo Rural District. The spelling was changed from Llandilo to Llandeilo in 1957.

The district was abolished following local government reorganisation in 1974, with the area becoming part of the new borough of Dinefwr.
