= Alltwalis =

Village in Carmarthenshire, Wales

Coordinates: 51.9619°N 4.2633°W

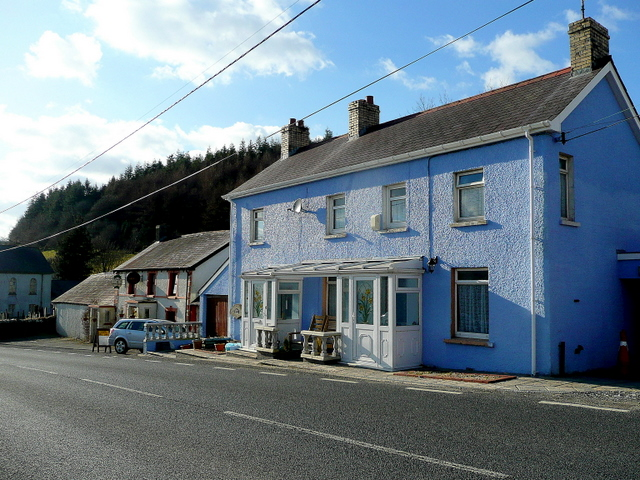

- Location within Carmarthenshire
- Community: Llanfihangel-ar-Arth
- Principal area: Carmarthenshire
- Preserved county: Dyfed
- Country: Wales
- Sovereign state: United Kingdom
- Post town: Carmarthen
- Postcode district: SA32
- Police: Dyfed-Powys
- Fire: Mid and West Wales
- Ambulance: Welsh
- UK Parliament: Caerfyrddin
- Senedd Cymru – Welsh Parliament: Carmarthen East and Dinefwr

Alltwalis is a village in Carmarthen, Carmarthenshire, Wales. It has a wind farm called Alltwalis Wind Farm.
