= Gwyddgrug =

Village in Carmarthenshire, Wales

Coordinates: 51°59′52″N 4°14′16.52″W

Gwyddgrug is a small village in Carmarthenshire, West Wales. It is located on the main A485 road south of New Inn.

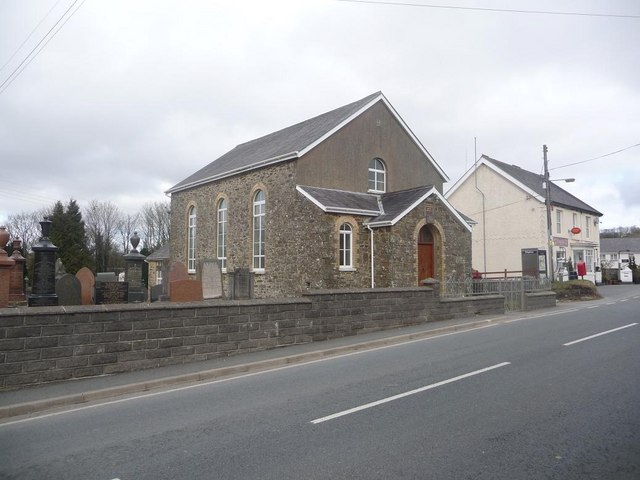
Gwyddgrug Independent Chapel in February 2009
