= New Inn, Carmarthenshire =

Village in Carmarthenshire, Wales

Coordinates: 52.008549°N 4.227055°W

New Inn
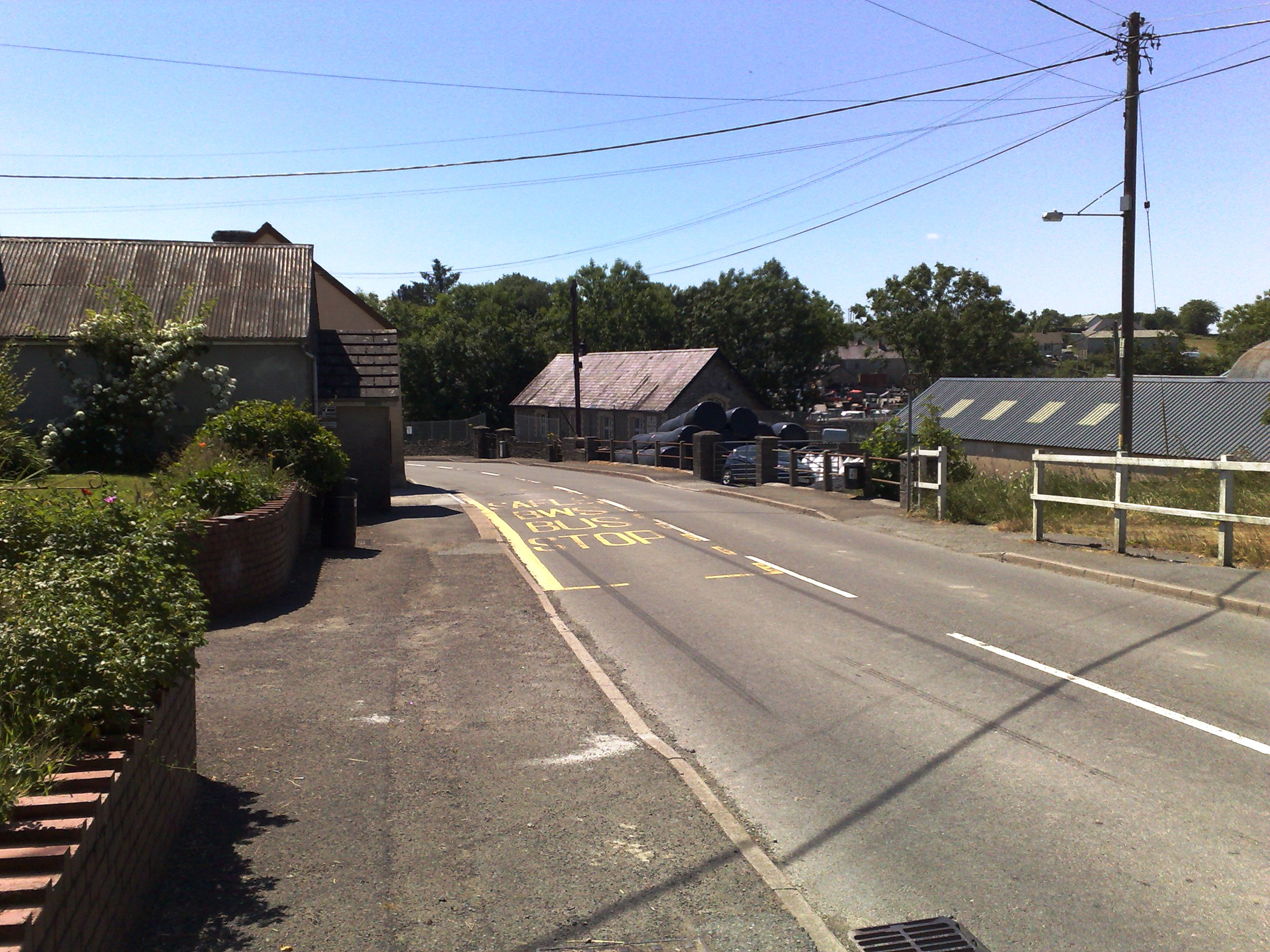
- Section of road outside old school building

- Location within Carmarthenshire
- Population: 317
- OS grid reference: SN473367
- Community: Llanfihangel-ar-Arth
- Principal area: Carmarthenshire
- Preserved county: Dyfed
- Country: Wales
- Sovereign state: United Kingdom
- Post town: PENCADER
- Postcode district: SA39
- Dialling code: 01559
- Police: Dyfed-Powys
- Fire: Mid and West Wales
- Ambulance: Welsh
- UK Parliament: Caerfyrddin
- Senedd Cymru – Welsh Parliament: Carmarthen East and Dinefwr
- Website: https://www.pencader.org.uk/villages/new-inn/

New Inn (Welsh pronunciation) is a small village in Carmarthenshire, Wales with a population of around 317 people. It is situated along the A485 A road between Llanllwni and Gwyddgrug, approximately four miles from the village of Pencader. It is a linear settlement of around sixty houses and a chapel.

== History ==
New Inn developed at the crossroads of a Roman road, Sarn Helen, going from south to north, and a track that later became a drovers' road going from west to east.

The village was the commercial centre of the area by the mid 19th Century, with three public houses, a general store exporting vast quantities of butter and cheese to Carmarthen docks and an inn, 'The Traveller's Rest'. The village experienced a decline in trade due to the opening of a railway in the nearby settlement of Pencader. The community school in the village opened in 1881.

In 2007, the school was closed by the LEA due to a decline in the number of pupils and financial concerns. The two remaining public houses and the general store in the village have also closed.

As of April 2026, there was an agricultural machinery merchant, engineering company and dairy farm based in the village, as well as a Methodist chapel.

== Transport ==
The village is located on the A485 A road which connects it to the nearby towns of Carmarthen and Lampeter. There are also numerous public footpaths and bridleways which connect it to the nearby villages of Pencader and Gwyddgrug.

The TrawsCymru T1 bus service, which starts in Lampeter and ends in Carmarthen stops hourly in the village.

== Demographics ==
Data from the 2021 Census showed approximately 59.5% of people in the village aged 3 or over could speak, read or write Welsh.

== Image gallery ==
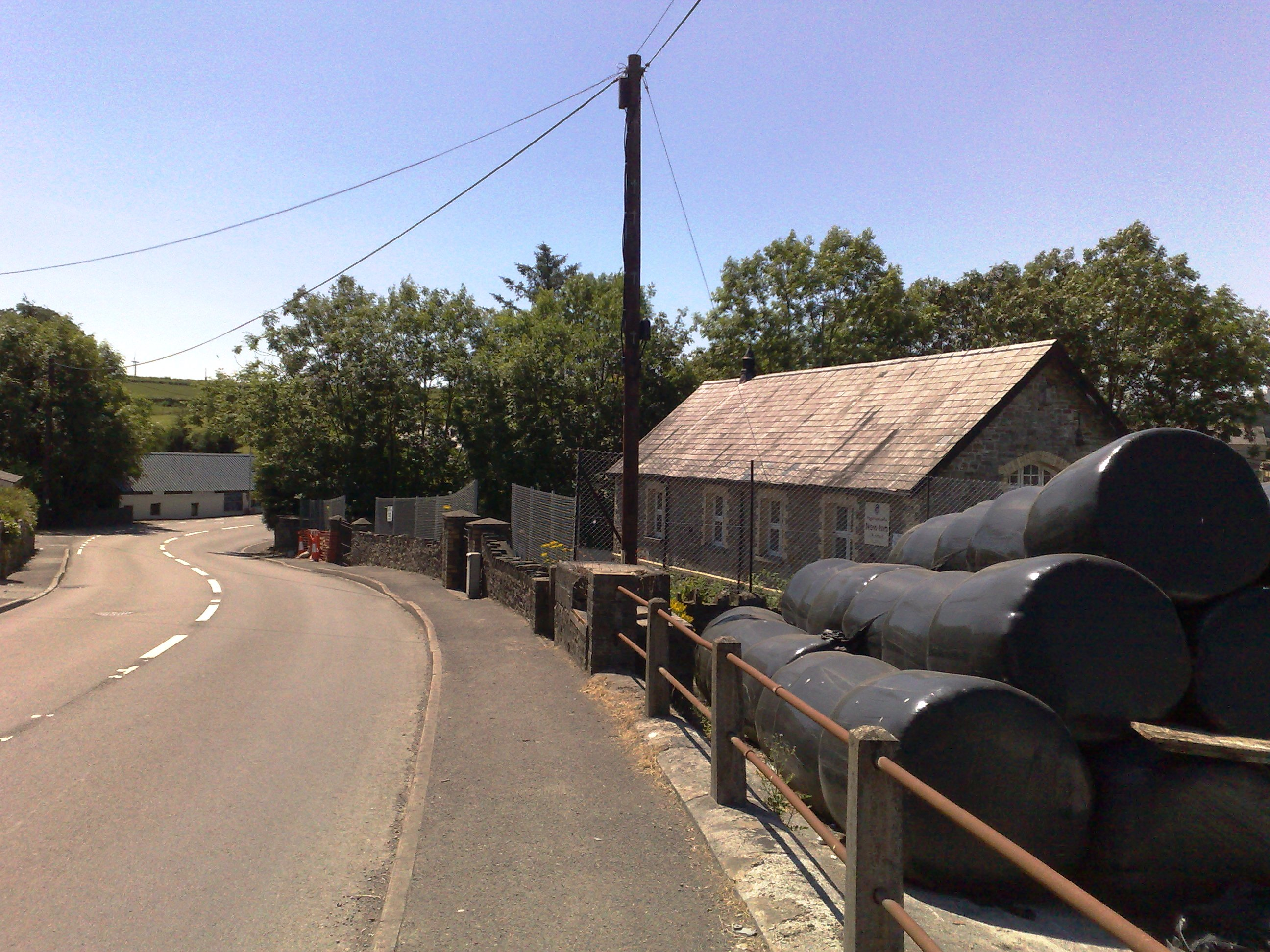
View of the old school building

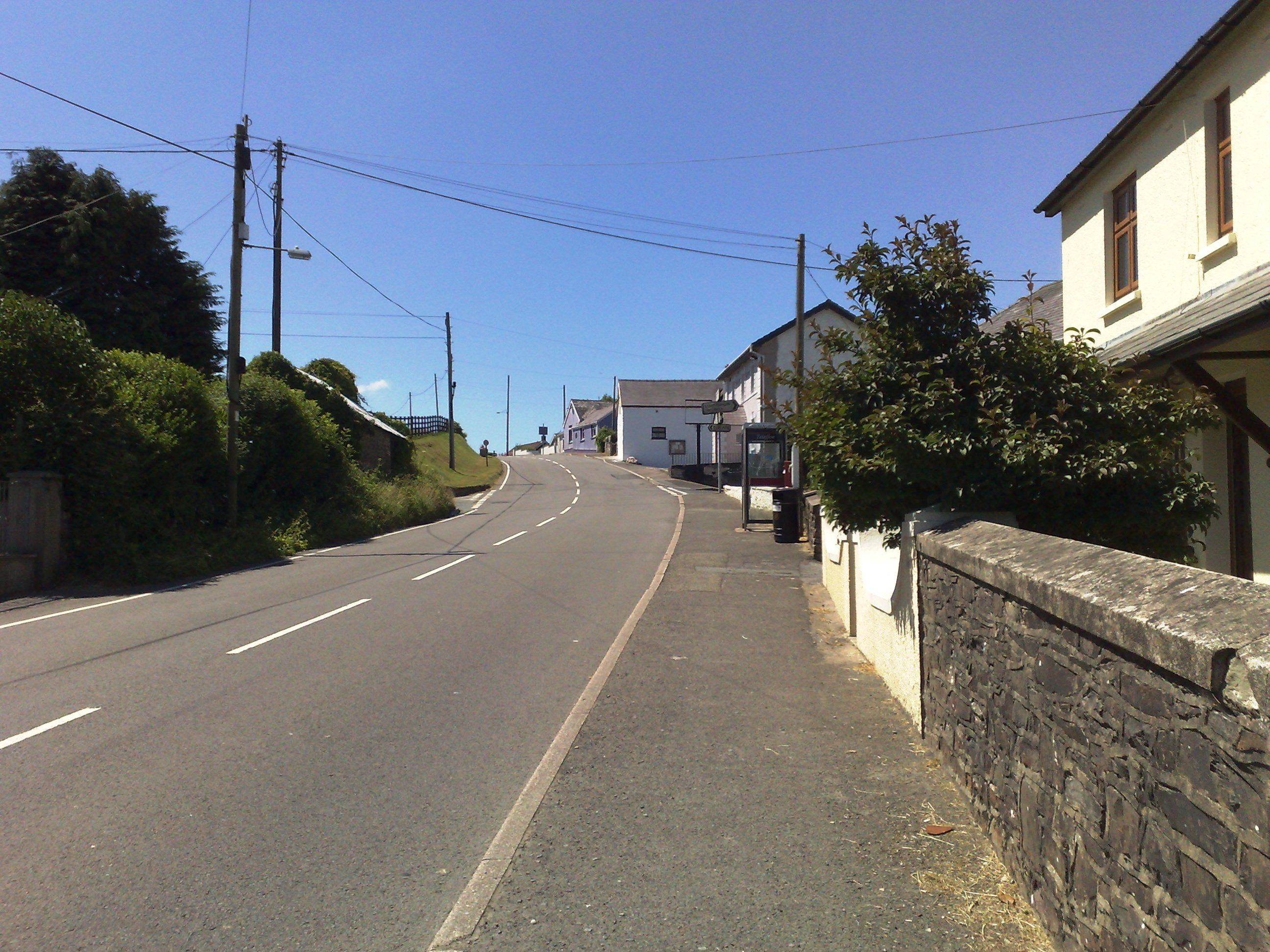
Crossroads in centre of village

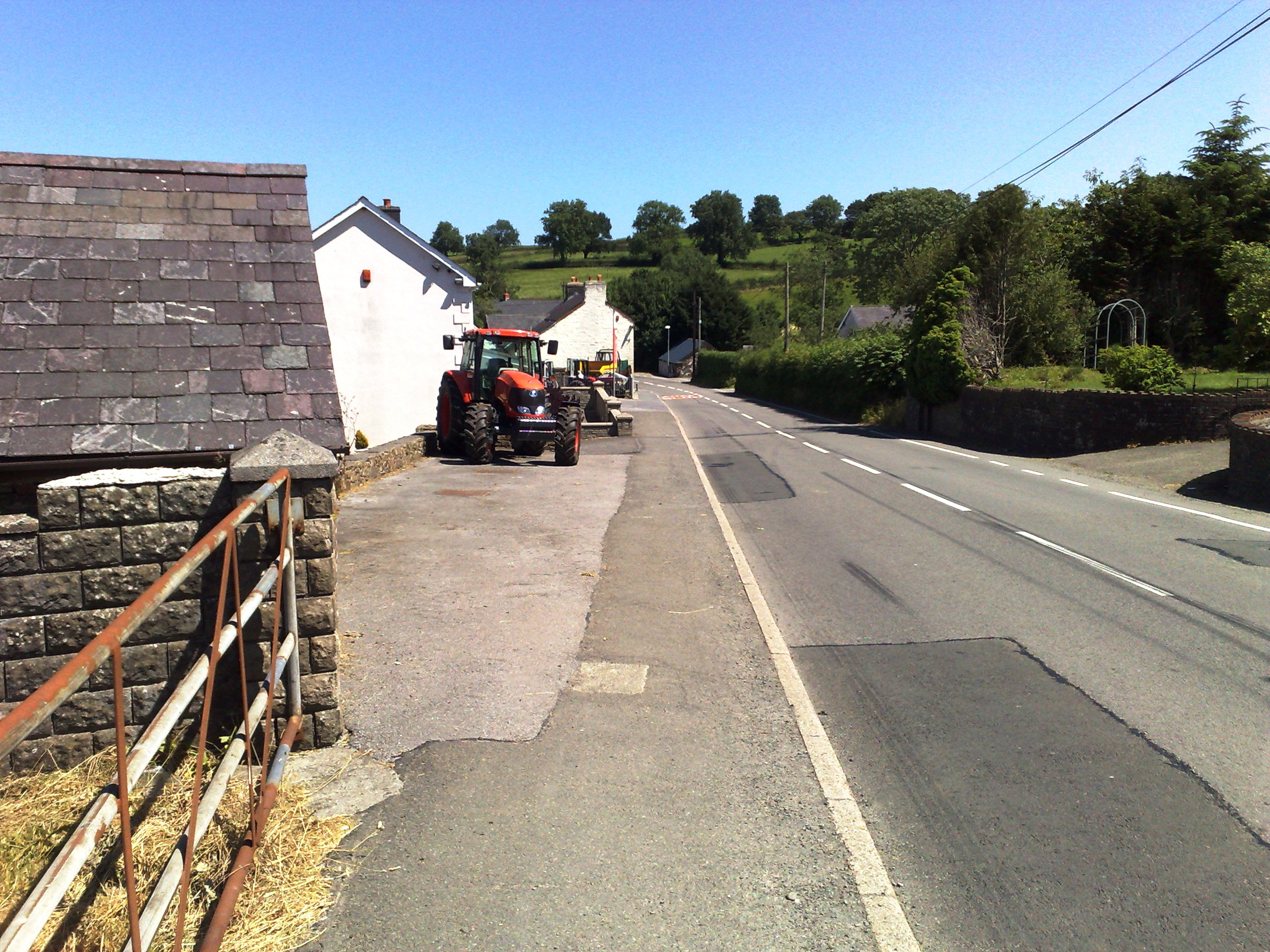
Section of road in centre of village
