= Derwydd, Carmarthenshire =

Hamlet in Carmarthenshire, Wales

Coordinates: 51.8433°N 3.9975°W

Derwydd is a hamlet in the south-east of Carmarthenshire, Wales, historically situated in the parish of Llandybie, north of Ammanford. It is around halfway between Ammanford (to the south) and Llandeilo, at a rural crossroads between the A483 and A476 roads.

The name of the hamlet literally means "druid" in Welsh, but is more likely to have derived from derwen (oak tree), which are common in the area.

In 1870–72, John Marius Wilson's Imperial Gazetteer of England and Wales described Derwydd as follows: "DERWIDD, or Derwydd, a hamlet in Llandebie parish, Carmarthen; on the river Cennen, near the Vale of Towy railway, 4 miles SSE of Llandeilo-fawr. Derwidd-Road station, on the railway, is east of the hamlet. Derwidd House belonged to Sir Harry Vaughan, who commanded in the army of Charles I.; belonged afterwards to the Stepneys; and contains some furniture of the time of Henry VIII."

== See also ==
- History of the Vaughans of Derwydd
- List of places in Carmarthenshire
