= Llangeler =

Hamlet and community in Carmarthenshire, Wales

Coordinates: 52°01′N 4°23′W

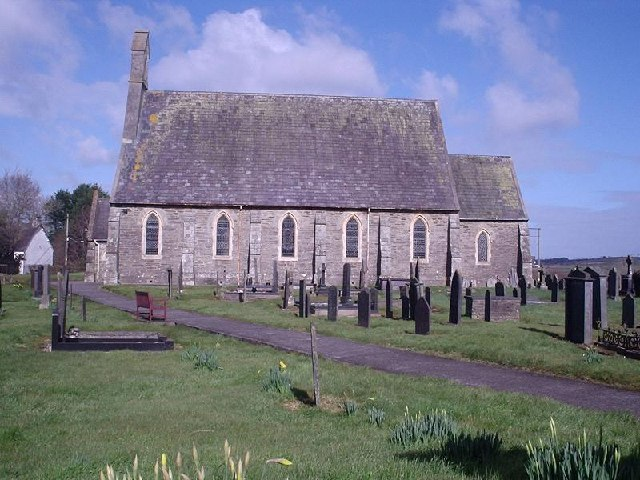
- Llangeler Church

- Location within Carmarthenshire
- Population: 3,427 (2011 census)
- Community: Llangeler
- Principal area: Carmarthenshire
- Country: Wales
- Sovereign state: United Kingdom
- UK Parliament: Caerfyrddin
- List of places UK Wales Carmarthenshire Map of the community

Llangeler (Welsh pronunciation) is a hamlet and community located in north Carmarthenshire, Wales. The name is believed to refer to St. Gelert. Llangeler parish covers a wide area including to the west, the textile village of Drefach Felindre, Waungilwen, Cwmpengraig and to the east, Pont Tyweli which adjoins Llandysul on the Carmarthenshire side of the River Teifi. The population of the parish was 3,222 at the Census of 2001, increasing to 3,427 at the 2011 census.

The community is bordered by the communities of: Llanfihangel-ar-Arth; Cynwyl Elfed; Cenarth; and Newcastle Emlyn, all being in Carmarthenshire; and by Llandyfriog and Llandysul in Ceredigion.

== History ==
The church is dedicated to St Celer, a hermit and martyr who lived in the nearby woods in the 7th century. It has a circular churchyard which suggests that the settlement is very old. There was a holy well near the churchyard and Sir John Lloyd's History of Carmarthenshire refers to an ancient stone, Yr hen lech, to which was attributed healing powers. Sick persons were required to bathe in Ffynnon Celer, the holy well, before sleeping on the stone.

There were nine holy wells in the parish of Llangeler. Their existence was recorded by Francis Jones in his book Holy Wells of Wales. Such wells were often roofed and had small chapels with niches for statues of saints, and pilgrims came in large numbers to visit them. The exact whereabouts of many of the wells in the parish have now been lost.

== Notable people ==
- Daniel Rees (1793–1857), a Welsh clergyman and hymnwriter; born at Felin Newydd
- John Harris Jones (1827–1885), a Calvinistic Methodist minister and classical tutor at Trevecca College.
