= Milo, Carmarthenshire =

Village in Carmarthenshire, Wales

Coordinates: 51.838452°N 4.037384°W

Milo is a small village of some 50 homes in the parish of Llanfihangel Aberbythych, some three miles north of Ammanford in Carmarthenshire, Wales.

According to the 2001 census, the parish is home to 1,277 inhabitants.
