= Crugybar =

Village in Carmarthenshire, Wales

Coordinates: 52°01′N 3°57′W

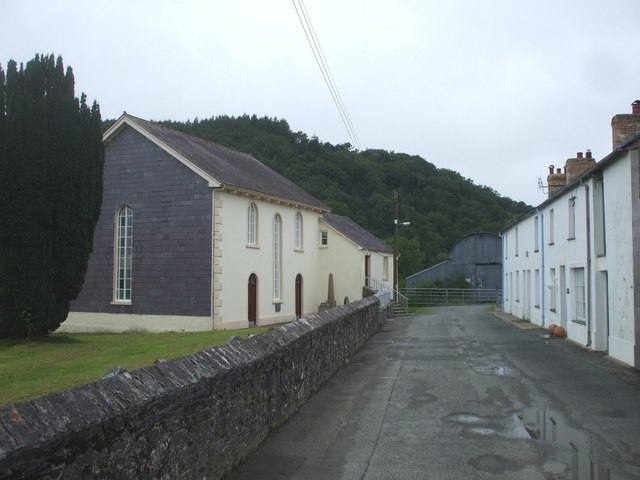
- Chapel and terrace of cottages, Crugybar

- Location within Carmarthenshire
- Community: Llanwrda
- Principal area: Carmarthenshire
- Preserved county: Dyfed
- Country: Wales
- Sovereign state: United Kingdom
- Post town: Whitland
- Police: Dyfed-Powys
- Fire: Mid and West Wales
- Ambulance: Welsh
- UK Parliament: Caerfyrddin
- Senedd Cymru – Welsh Parliament: Carmarthen West and South Pembrokeshire

Crugybar is a village in Carmarthenshire, Wales, located between Talley and Pumsaint. It is roughly of equal distance from Lampeter, Llandovery and Llandeilo. It is within the parish of Llanwrda.

== Etymology ==
The Welsh word "Crug" most commonly refers to a mound of earth, often a burial mound. The meaning of "y bar" is less certain but has been linked to the Modern Welsh word "Barnu", meaning "wrath" or "judgement", giving a possible etymology of "burial place of the wrathful" or "burial place of the judged".

This derivation is possibly a folk etymology, connected with the local account that the Romans buried their dead here following a ferocious battle with the forces of Boudica (or Buddug in Welsh).

== Geography ==
The village of Crugybar is located on the B4302 about half a mile south of the junction between that road and the A482, the road from Lampeter to Llanwrda. The village lies in the valley of the Annell, a tributary of the Afon Cothi, with low hills on either side.

== The village ==
At one time the village had a primary school but that is long closed, and the building has been converted into a community owned village hall and community centre. It was completely refurbished in 2013 and now has a kitchen and disabled access and is able to seat about sixty people.

The Crugybar Independent Chapel is a Grade II listed building. It was established about 1688, a new chapel was built 1765, and was further rebuilt and enlarged in 1837. It was then refitted in 1893. It has a rendered, three-bay front with arched windows and door openings and many original interior fittings.

At the far end of the village with the Bridgend Inn is the local petrol station that doubles as the village shop, Down Home Stoves and Felin Newydd, a water-driven corn mill. The mill is no longer open to the public. When the mill was renovated back to working order in the 1980s, writing was found on the walls with reference to the then Davies family owners whose daughter and son-in-law emigrated to Patagonia, Argentina in the late 19th century.

Behind the Bridgend Inn runs a one-way street, a continuation of the road from Caio to Crugybar and likely to have been used by drovers taking livestock from Carmarthenshire on to the English border towns for sale.
