= Cwmffrwd =

Village in Carmarthenshire, Wales

Coordinates: 51.8322°N 4.2892°W

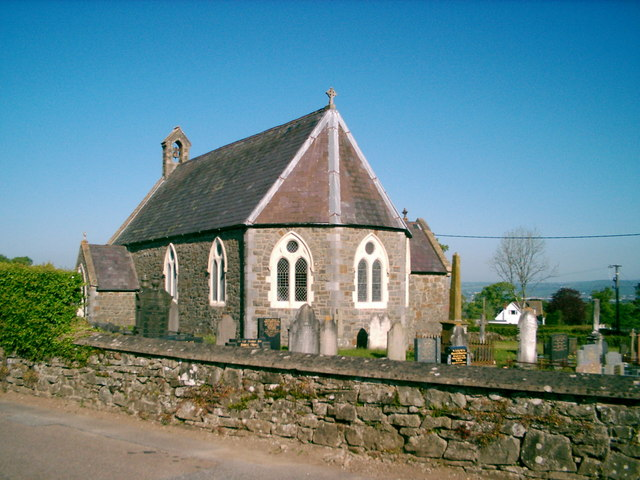
- Eglwys Santes Ann, Cwmffrwd

- Location within Carmarthenshire
- Population: 500
- OS grid reference: SN423173
- Community: Llandyfaelog
- Principal area: Carmarthenshire
- Preserved county: Dyfed
- Country: Wales
- Sovereign state: United Kingdom
- Post town: CARMARTHEN
- Postcode district: SA31
- Dialling code: 01267
- Police: Dyfed-Powys
- Fire: Mid and West Wales
- Ambulance: Welsh
- UK Parliament: Llanelli
- Senedd Cymru – Welsh Parliament: Carmarthen East and Dinefwr

Cwmffrwd is a village in Carmarthenshire, Wales, located around two miles (3.2 km) south of Carmarthen.

Cwmffrwd is mainly a 20th-century settlement dominating the small river Nant Cwmffrwd, with some 19th-century elements. Its main access road, Heol Nantyglasdwr, connects the village to the A484 and leads directly into the main residential street, Maesglasnant.

The stone bridge over the river Nant Pibwr north of Cwmffrwd, at the old highway leading to Carmarthen, may have been built on remains of Roman foundations.

== Landmarks ==
St. Anne's is a small church north-east of the village.

== Transport ==
Buses stop in both directions on the A484.
