= Capel Dewi, Carmarthenshire =

Village in Carmarthenshire, Wales

Coordinates: 51.860°N 4.214°W

Capel Dewi: Welsh: Capel Dewi
- Location within Carmarthenshire
- OS grid reference: SN475202
- Community: Llanarthney
- Principal area: Carmarthenshire
- Preserved county: Dyfed
- Country: Wales
- Sovereign state: United Kingdom
- Post town: CARMARTHEN
- Postcode district: SA32
- Dialling code: 01267
- Police: Dyfed-Powys
- Fire: Mid and West Wales
- Ambulance: Welsh
- UK Parliament: Caerfyrddin
- Senedd Cymru – Welsh Parliament: Carmarthen East and Dinefwr

Capel Dewi is a small village in Carmarthenshire, Wales. The village is built on raised ground to the south of the River Towy, and to the east of the area's principal settlement Carmarthen. Originally a farming community, Capel Dewi has grown into a commuter village, serving Carmarthen and the surrounding area. Today it is part of the community of Llanarthney.

Capel Dewi is a village made up of several buildings, one of the oldest being the chapel. Originally known as Capel Heol Dwr it was built in the early nineteenth century by a wealthy Wesleyan man. In 1834 it was bought by a member of the Water Street Methodist Chapel in Carmarthen, and since then the building has been known as Capel Heol Dwr (Water Street Chapel). The property is registered by Cadw, though after closing in 2001 it has now been converted into a home. The only school built in the village was closed in 1963
