= Llandyfaelog =

Community in Carmarthenshire, Wales

Coordinates: 51°46′55″N 4°17′45″W

- Community
- Location within Carmarthenshire
- Principal area: Carmarthenshire
- Country: Wales
- Sovereign state: United Kingdom
- Police: Dyfed-Powys
- Fire: Mid and West Wales
- Ambulance: Welsh
- List of places UK Wales Carmarthenshire Map of the community

Llandyfaelog (Welsh pronunciation) is a community located in Carmarthenshire, Wales.

According to the 2001 census the community has a population of 1,272, of which 71.88 percent are Welsh speaking. The population at the 2011 Census had increased to 1,304.

The community is bordered by the communities of Llangunnor, Llangyndeyrn, Kidwelly, St Ishmael, Llangain, and Carmarthen, all being in Carmarthenshire, and includes the villages of Idole, Croesyceiliog and Cwmffrwd.

== Governance ==
Llandyfaelog has its own community council. For elections to Carmarthenshire County Council, Llandyfaelog was covered by the St Ishmael ward (including neighbouring St Ishmael), electing one county councillor.

Following a boundary review, from the May 2022 local elections Llandyfaelog became part of the Llangyndeyrn county ward which includes the neighbouring Llangyndeyrn community.

== Notable residents ==
- Peter Williams (1723–1796), clergyman, publisher of Welsh-language Bibles
- Peter Bailey Williams (1763–1836), Anglican priest and amateur antiquarian.
- David Daniel Davis (1777–1841), physician and early obstetrician
- Sharon Morgan (born 1949), actress
