= Aber-giar =

Village in Carmarthenshire, Wales

Coordinates: 52°02′49″N 4°11′04″W

Aber-giar (Welsh: Abergiâr) is a village in the community of Llanllwni in Carmarthenshire, Wales.

== Toponymy ==
The village name means 'mouth of the Iâr'. The stream called Nant Iâr has its confluence (aber) in the village with a tributary of the Teifi called Nant Ceiliog. Both streams are named after fowl, with iâr meaning hen, and ceiliog meaning cockerel. A 'g' was added onto the beginning of 'iâr' in Abergiâr because of the mistaken assumption that it must have been there originally before being lost to lenition.
