= Cwmbach, Carmarthenshire =

Hamlet in Carmarthenshire, Wales

Coordinates: 51°41′44″N 4°11′23″W

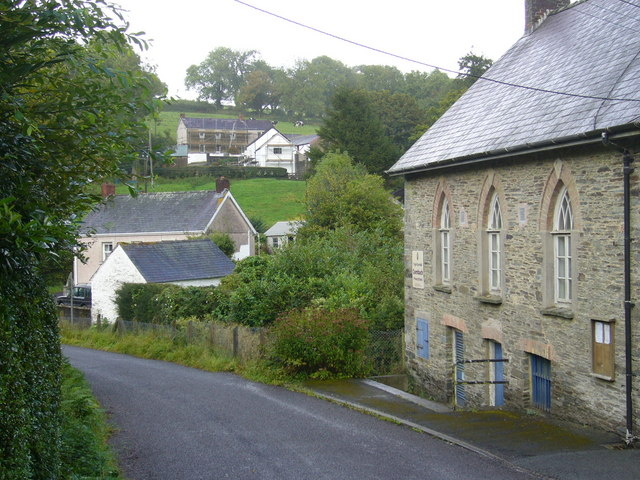
The now closed Cwmbach Primary School on the right

Cwmbach is a small hamlet in Stradey Woods (Coed y Strade) between Llanelli and Trimsaran in Carmarthenshire, Wales. The village was home to a (now closed) chapel and a (now closed) public house. In 2002 Carmarthenshire County Council approved plans to close the primary school due to low pupil numbers, and the high cost of keeping the school open.

It is based around the Afon Cwmmawr and Afon Dulais that join in the heart of the hamlet, and meet the sea at Ffynnon Helyg at nearby Pwll. Welsh is the dominant language.
