= Llanfihangel-uwch-Gwili =

Village in Carmarthenshire, Wales

Coordinates: 51°53′N 4°12′W

Llanfihangel-uwch-Gwili is a village in Carmarthenshire, Wales. The church is one of many in Wales dedicated to Saint Michael the Archangel.
