= Pontarsais =

Village in Carmarthenshire, Wales

Coordinates: 51.932°N 4.267°W

Pont-ar-sais
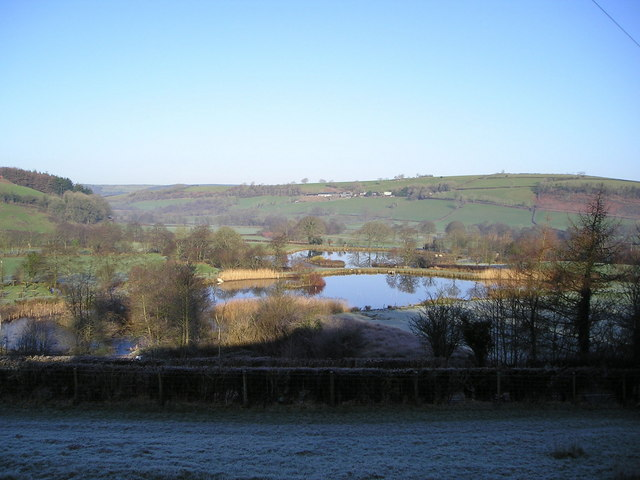
- Ponds near Pontarsais

- Location within Carmarthenshire
- OS grid reference: SN442283
- Community: Llanllawddog
- Principal area: Carmarthenshire
- Preserved county: Dyfed
- Country: Wales
- Sovereign state: United Kingdom
- Post town: Carmarthen
- Postcode district: SA32
- Police: Dyfed-Powys
- Fire: Mid and West Wales
- Ambulance: Welsh
- UK Parliament: Caerfyrddin
- Senedd Cymru – Welsh Parliament: Carmarthen East and Dinefwr

Pontarsais is a village in Carmarthenshire, Wales, 5 miles (8 km) north of Carmarthen and 57 miles (92 km) miles northwest of Cardiff (Caerdydd). The nearest railway station is Llwyfan Cerrig on a heritage railway at Pentre Morgan 3 miles (5 km) southwest.

In 2014 powerline route options were being discussed.

== See also ==
List of places in Carmarthenshire
