= Cwmpengraig =

Village in Carmarthenshire, Wales

Coordinates: 52.004162°N 4.406738°W

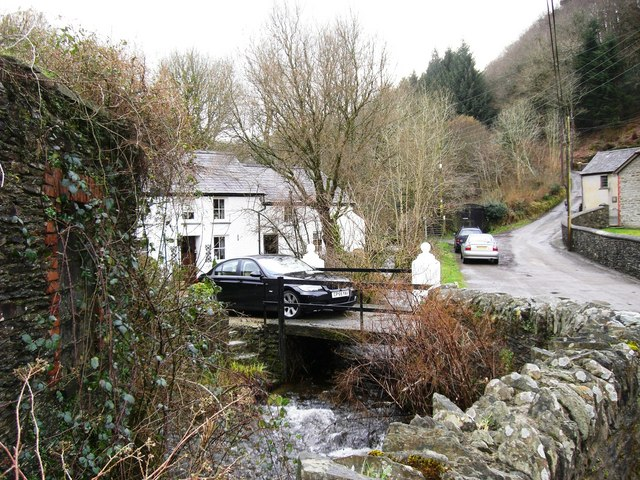

- Location within Carmarthenshire
- OS grid reference: SN3436
- Community: Llangeler
- Principal area: Carmarthenshire
- Preserved county: Dyfed
- Country: Wales
- Sovereign state: United Kingdom
- Post town: LLANDYSUL
- Postcode district: SA44
- Dialling code: 01559
- Police: Dyfed-Powys
- Fire: Mid and West Wales
- Ambulance: Welsh
- UK Parliament: Caerfyrddin
- Senedd Cymru – Welsh Parliament: Carmarthen East and Dinefwr

Cwmpengraig is a rural hamlet in Carmarthenshire, Wales, located in the Teifi Valley approximately 1.5 miles (2.4 km) from the village of Dre-fach Felindre.

== Woollen mills & trails ==
Cwmpengraig is part of the Carmarthen Heritage Trails and also the Discover Carmarthenshire ramblers trail for Dre-fach Felindre. Located just 1.5 miles from Dre-fach Felindre, Cwmpengraig is a small community with a history of woollen mill production. In the early 19th century, furling mills were established in Pentrecwrt, Dolwyon, Drefach and Cwmpengraig. By the beginning of the 20th century, substantial mills were built, employing 50-100 people. Mill cottages were built to house the employees although by the end of the 1920s the industry went into decline.

== The Hamlet ==
Through the centre of the hamlet runs the stream Nant Esgair which flows down into the rural village of Dre-fach Felindre. At the centre of the hamlet is Soar Chapel. A number of mill cottages still exist along the river valley.
