= Peniel, Carmarthenshire =

Village in Carmarthenshire, Wales

Coordinates: 51.894°N 4.274°W

Peniel
- Location within Carmarthenshire
- Principal area: Carmarthenshire
- Country: Wales
- Sovereign state: United Kingdom
- Police: Dyfed-Powys
- Fire: Mid and West Wales
- Ambulance: Welsh
- UK Parliament: Caerfyrddin

Peniel is a village in Carmarthenshire, Wales, 3 miles (4.8 km) north-east of Carmarthen.
