= Topographical poetry =

Poetry devoted to the description of specific places

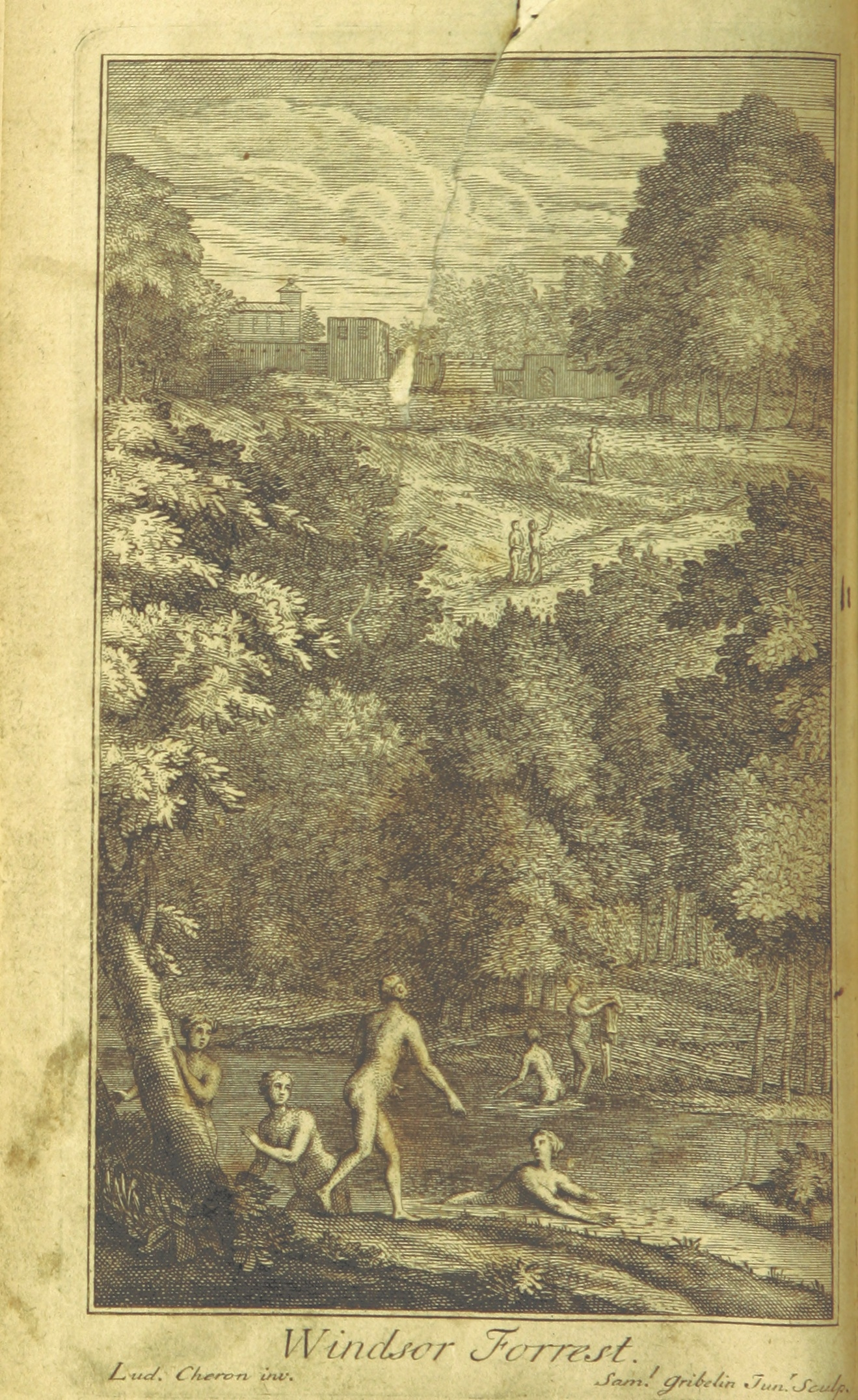
An engraving illustrating Pope's "Windsor Forest", 1720

Topographical poetry or loco-descriptive poetry is a genre of poetry that describes, and often praises, a landscape or place. John Denham's 1642 poem "Cooper's Hill" established the genre, which peaked in popularity in 18th-century England. Examples of topographical verse date, however, to the late classical period, and can be found throughout the medieval era and during the Renaissance. Though the earliest examples come mostly from continental Europe, the topographical poetry in the tradition originating with Denham concerns itself with the classics, and many of the various types of topographical verse, such as river, ruin, or hilltop poems were established by the early 17th century. Alexander Pope's "Windsor Forest" (1713) and John Dyer's "Grongar Hill" (1726/7) are two other often mentioned examples. In following centuries, Matthew Arnold's "The Scholar Gipsy" (1853) praised the Oxfordshire countryside, and W. H. Auden's "In Praise of Limestone" (1948) used a limestone landscape as an allegory.

Subgenres of topographical poetry include the country house poem, written in 17th-century England to compliment a wealthy patron, and the prospect poem, describing the view from a distance or a temporal view into the future, with the sense of opportunity or expectation. When understood broadly as landscape poetry and when assessed from its establishment to the present, topographical poetry can take on many formal situations and types of places. Kenneth Baker identifies 37 varieties and compiles poems from the 16th through the 20th centuries—from Edmund Spenser to Sylvia Plath—correspondent to each type, from "Walks and Surveys", to "Mountains, Hills, and the View from Above", to "Violation of Nature and the Landscape", to "Spirits and Ghosts".

Common aesthetic registers of which topographical poetry make use include pastoral imagery, the sublime, and the picturesque. These latter two registers subsume imagery of rivers, ruins, moonlight, birdsong, and clouds, peasants, mountains, caves, and waterscapes.

== Political and social themes ==
Though predicated on the description of a landscape or piece of scenery, topographical poetry often, at least implicitly, addresses a social or political issue or the meaning of nationality in some way. The description of elements in the landscape thus becomes a poetic vehicle through which a personal interpretation is delivered. For example, in John Denham's "Cooper's Hill", the speaker discusses the effects of religious intolerance in a poem published at the start of the First English Civil War:

Here should my wonder dwell, & here my praise,
But my fixt thoughts my wandring eye betrays,
Viewing a neighbouring hill, whose top of late
A Chappel crown'd, till in the Common Fate,
The adjoyning Abby fell: (may no such storm
Fall on our times, where ruine must reform.)
Tell me (my Muse) what monstrous dire offence,
What crime could any Christian King incense
To such a rage?

— ll. 111–119

The chapel and abbey in ruins on top of a nearby hill were the result of the reformist zeal that led to the Dissolution of the Monasteries. Now the religious spirit unleashed under royal auspices had come to question the constitutionality of the Divine right of kings which had allowed the dismantling of those ancient institutions in the first place. Later in the poem, the historical perspective is widened to include the signing of Magna Carta. In fact the poem has been credited since as a major influence on the landscape's cultural history, especially in establishing the site of Runnymede in the national consciousness.

For decades the poem served as the admired loco-descriptive model, earning for Denham an accolade from Alexander Pope in his own youthful imitation, "Windsor Forest":

On Cooper's Hill eternal wreaths shall grow
While lasts the mountain, or while Thames shall flow.

Later critics, however, were to deprecate in such poems and their successors "the complete subordination of the beauties of Nature to ethical and political reflection". Such judgements, though, grew up in the wake of the new taste for Romanticism at the end of the 18th century. Until then landscape poetry appealed to Classical models. Besides Denham's poem, Pope's "Windsor Forest" modeled itself on the Mosella of Ausonius, which had its own political agenda. For a purer celebration of country crafts there was the precedent of Vergil's Georgics behind John Philips' "Cyder" and "The Fleece" by John Dyer. Romantic regard for the latter, who was also the author of the topographical "Grongar Hill", is evidenced by William Wordsworth's sonnet in his praise, preferring him to those for whom "hasty Fame hath many a chaplet culled/ For worthless brows".

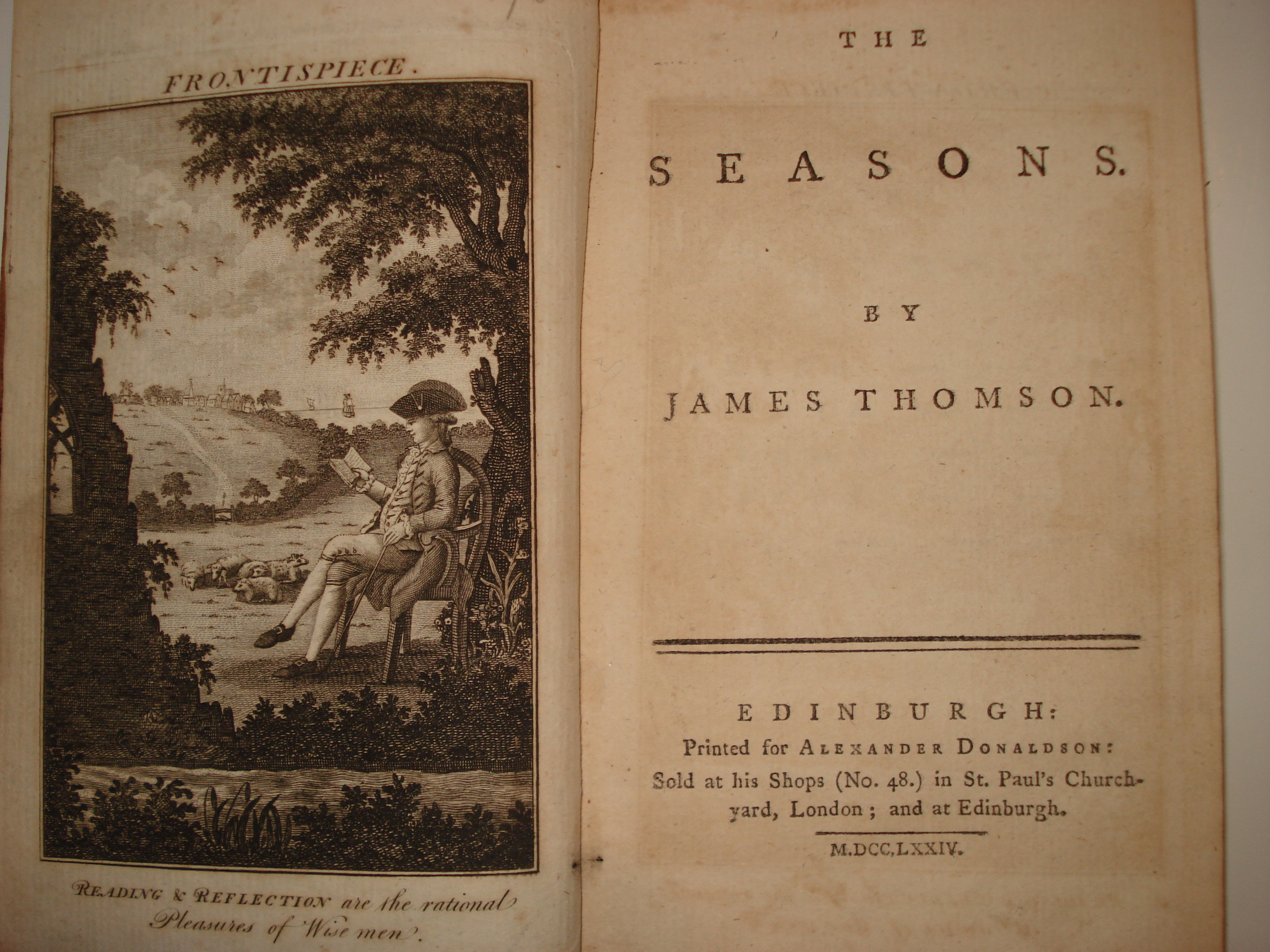
Frontispiece to James Thomson's The Seasons

James Thomson's long poem The Seasons provided an influential new model using Miltonic blank verse in place of the couplet. But it appeals to a class-specific social ideology by placing the landed gentry's authority on a level with the order of nature. The fierce snowstorm in "Winter", for example, is awe-inspiring but only dangerous for the generalized rustic shepherd struggling through it rather than reading about it, and the sympathy engendered through the former only serves to reaffirm the sensibility and political righteousness of the gentry. Thus, the importance and inevitability of submitting to the authority of nature is connected to the importance of maintaining social order, which the landed classes can do from their relatively safe position in the schema of the poem. In later editions of The Seasons, Thomson becomes increasingly explicit about his political message, using the language of the sublime in nature to flatter Whig politicians, a move based in the dedication or compliment to a patron common to topographical poetry in the early 18th century. The prospect-view was central in the early 18th century to the landed estates' relationship with poetry. It suggested that the natural scene corresponded with political dominance, and the presentation of a disinterested but shared value, a non-threatening aesthetic one, socially legitimized this dominance.

Yet for this same implicit social and political message and the way it was connected to nature, landscape poetry became a vehicle for William Wordsworth, Coleridge, and the later Romantics to offer new ways of understanding the landscape's relationship with poetry and politics. Indeed, Wordsworth's "Lines written a few miles above Tintern Abbey" marks a change in the course of the genre. Increasingly, the landscape and the issues implicit in it, once registered by the poet's external sight, become internalised and subject to inward contemplation

Until, the breath of this corporeal frame
And even the motion of our human blood
Almost suspended, we are laid asleep
In body, and become a living soul:
While with any eye made quiet by the power
Of harmony, and the deep power of joy,
We see into the life of things.

— ll 44–48

Recent criticism has used close readings of the poem to question the efficacy of such internalisation in that it seems deliberately to avoid evidence of the human interaction with the landscape that was the focus of earlier poets. For example, Marjorie Levinson views him "as managing to see into the life of things only 'by narrowing and skewing his field of vision' and by excluding 'certain conflictual sights and meanings'". Nor was Wordsworth's 'egotistical sublime' much admired by the next generation of Romantic poets. The Radicalism espoused by Percy Bysshe Shelley invades his contemplation of landscape in "Lines Written Among the Euganean Hills" and is everywhere apparent in Lord Byron's Childe Harold's Pilgrimage.

The transition, even in their case however, has been to a subjective viewpoint. Where the Classically inspired poets claimed to draw their idea of order from the landscapes they contemplated, from 'Nature', the poets of the 19th century bring their private preoccupations with them into the landscape. This is so even when there is an appeal to the Classical past. Matthew Arnold on "Dover Beach" calls to mind lines by Sophocles on listening to the sound of the sea but goes on to apply a modern religious lesson; it is "The Sea of Faith" of which "now I only hear/ Its melancholy, long, withdrawing roar". The operative emphasis here is on the personal pronoun.

== In the Romantic era ==
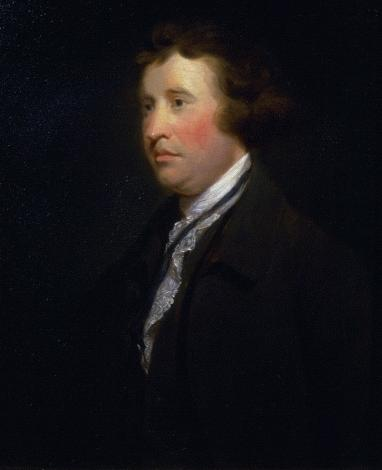
Edmund Burke's writing on the sublime influenced the Romantic era of topographical poetry.

A change in the perception and evaluation of landscape was one mark of the entrance into the era of British Romanticism. Visual and literary art as well as political and philosophical prose recorded this change. Especially after William Gilpin's Observations on the River Wye was published in 1782, the idea of the picturesque began to influence artists and viewers. Gilpin advocated approaching the landscape "by the rules of picturesque beauty," which emphasized contrast and variety. Edmund Burke's A Philosophical Enquiry into the Origin of Our Ideas of the Sublime and Beautiful (1757) was previously an influential text. The notion of the sublime in language, marked by elevated rhetoric or speech, dates to Grecian Late Antiquity, Longinus' On the Sublime, which was translated into French in the late 17th century. Shortly thereafter in England, John Dennis brought attention to Longinus' argument for the emotive power of figurative language in poetry. From this time, and into the mid-18th century, a taste for the sublime in landscape emerged with the sublime in language. An earlier topographical poem that influenced the romantics, James Thomson's The Seasons (1726–30), reveals the influence of Longinus via Dennis.

Some scholars argue that the crystallization of the picturesque and the sublime as aesthetic categories coincided with a social trend toward "presumptions of unity" based on an increasingly consolidated national identity in the second half of the 18th century. Almost every community, according to Robert Aubin's catalogue, merited landscape poetry. Thus, this argument connects the prominence of the aesthetic viewpoint that the genre maintained to "the formation of a national culture." Because the picturesque conventions of landscape poetry strengthened the middle class's relationship to an aesthetic paradigm, the emerging class consciousness unified itself around a shared perception of nature. In his preface to Llangunnor Hill: a loco-descriptive Poem, John Bethell announces his awareness of his participation in a well-established and critiqued genre meant for public appraisal:

The opinions of many learned men on the subject of descriptive poetry, and its occasional embellishments, having differed considerably when their abilities were exercised in examining the productions of authors of the first literary eminence, presented a difficulty of choice in regard to the plan and execution of the subsequent undertaking. It has been the object of the writer to profit by the sentiments of professed critics, given on the works familiar to his own, and by avoiding either extreme, to pursue, as far as his judgment enabled him, an intermediate course. How far he has succeeded in that endeavor, is humbly submitted to the decision of a generous public...

Another average poet in the topographical poetry of the late 18th century, John Grisborne, canvasses many of the conventions of the genre in only the first canto of his poem The vales of Wever, a loco-descriptive poem, inscribed to the Reverend John Granville, of Calwich, Straffordshire:

ADDRESS to Wotton.—Noontide Clouds.—Scenery from the Terrace at Wootton.—Eaton Woods.—Mr. Mundy.—Address to Hygeia as Guardian of the Scene.—Different Trees growing in the Vale below Wootton.—Scenery by Moonlight.—Melna and Ghost of Hidallan.—Norbury.—An aged Oak : Insects living under its Bark.—The Spider.—Hygeia entreated to preside over Wootton in all the Seasons.—A Digression.—Pillars of Ice during the Winter from the Rocks.—Frost, his Threats.—Triumph of Flora.—Empress of Russia. –Her Threats.—The Fall of Poland. –Probable Triumph of Poland.—General Washington on the Temple of Virtue crowned by Liberty and Peace.—Wootton under the Influence of Snow-storms and Wind at Midnight : Effects of the Storm on the Hare, Fieldfare, and Village Dog, &c.—Sun-rife.—Return from the Digression.—Local Scenery near Wootton.—Mr. Gilpin.—Scenery in the New Forest.—Accent up Wever Hills.—Address to the Clouds and Breezes.—Wever : Scenery from his Summit.—River Dove.—Grindon.—Thor's Cave.

Gisborne utilizes a number of characteristic conventions, "the invocation to a lord or patron, the stationing of the lord or poet, the ordering of subjects according to a visual plan, the comparison with a classical or contemporary political or aesthetic ideal," such that he supports the idea of landscape poetry as an imitable type of "social praxis" thus belonging to "a specifically political and social dynamic." He relates the minutiae of living nature and the effect of the seasons, makes a politically charged digression, takes on a prospect-view, represents different times of day, caves, and rivers, and alludes to classical guardianship.

Both Bethell and Gisborne include extensive footnotes that elaborate on the particular places mentioned throughout their poems. In these notes, they often address the reader by presuming his or her response, belief or disbelief in the scene. These annotations, while perhaps distracting from the verse's force in its own right, show how the genre was conscious of its readership's potential to either actually witness the scenes as a tourist or be able to vicariously witness them through the efforts of the poet.

The argument for the picturesque's connection to a unifying national identity in England could not be successfully translated into Irish topographical poetry. Historical references often account for more than one culture and negotiate the tension between local situations and imperial prerogatives, and thus tend toward an explanatory narrative of Irish institutions which distinguishes the Irish topographical poetry from the British. At times these explanations subordinate aesthetic description. Furthermore, Ireland experienced an "anxiety with respect to its own national audience," and the poets often intervened to remark on their negotiation of Irish land's clear aesthetic and economic appeals and the reality of its impoverishment. One prime example of these complications is John Leslie's Killarney, a Poem (written in Dublin 1772). The Lakes of Killarney and the Giant's Causeway were the two most common sites that inspired Irish topographical verse: Patrick O'Kelley's Killarney: A Descriptive Poem and The Giant's Causeway, Joseph Atkinson's Killarney: A Poem, W. A. Bryson's "Moonlight Scenes at Killarney," Rev. Charles Hoyle's Three Days at Killarney, Rev. William Hamilton Drummond's The Giant's Causeway, a Poem, John McKinley's Poetic Sketches, Descriptive of the Giant's Causeway, and the Surrounding Scenery are some other examples, all published between 1803 and 1809.

== Subgenre: the prospect poem ==
John Wilson Foster defines the term "prospect" in the poetic understanding of spatial and temporal meanings:

A prospect is a view into the distance (space); it is also a view into the future (distance in time), often with the suggestion of opportunity or expectation: in each case, a prospect is a view of something beyond, yet to be achieved or satisfying merely in the spectacle. Understood in both its spatial and temporal senses, the prospect was a frequent culmination of traditional allegory...

The early topographical poems of the 17th century and 18th century centered on urban locales of power and often described aspects of the city such as buildings, major rivers and parks. Later topographical poems written during the romantic period moved away from cities and into the provinces. Romantic poets also rejected the scientific and informative approach employed by the early topographical poets. Instead of being scientific observers, the romantic poets who wrote prospect poems tried to create a sense of a presence and emotion that gave life to the landscape.

Topographical poetry, especially the prospect poem, moved from the scientific and geographical description to become a venue for personal, historical and meditative thought. Brigitte Peucker describes that "nature in the topographical poem is not a medium of human transcendence or transformation but rather an emblem or mirror of the perambulatory figure in the foreground—of man as man". The prospect when seen through the muse or imagination provides an escape from time and reality. Shifts in tense are often a characteristic of prospect poems.
