= The Sugar Cane =

Scottish poem about the West Indies

The Sugar Cane is a georgic poem by James Grainger adapted to a West Indian theme, first published in 1764. With renewed interest in Caribbean literature, and especially after a new edition was published in 2000, it has attracted critical attention, especially its author's attitude towards slavery.

== Background ==
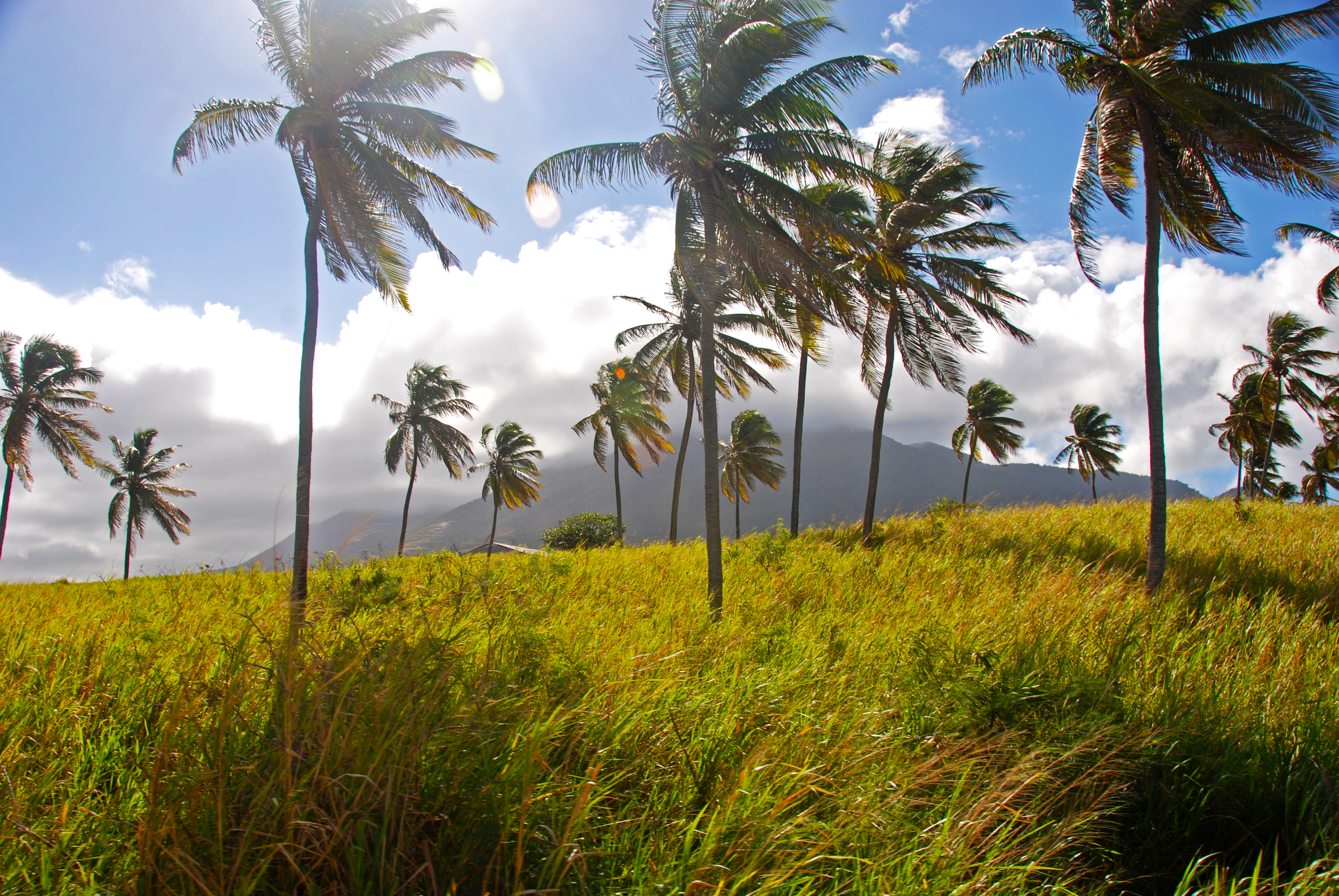
St Kitts landscape

The Scottish doctor James Grainger settled on the West Indian island of St. Kitts in 1759. Upon his marrying there, Grainger's parents-in-law made him manager of the family's sugar estates. At the same time he also set up in medical practice and rode about the island visiting patients. His georgic poem The Sugar Cane was substantially completed by 1762 and represents all he had learned on the subject of planting, about his new home in general, and about the diseases to which the slaves working there were subject. For a few months in 1763-4 he made a brief return visit to Britain and arranged for his poem to be published there. About half the book's text was made up of voluminous explanatory and descriptive notes.

== A West-India georgic ==
The introduction to The Sugar Cane mentions the exoticism and novelty of his new surroundings as Grainger's main reason for writing his "West-India georgic", coupled with the example of adaptations of the Classical model to domestic subjects such as John Philips' Cyder (1708) and John Dyer's The Fleece (1757) - which Grainger had been among the few to review favourably on its first appearance. Samuel Johnson also recognised the subject's novelty in his review in the Critical Quarterly: "A new creation is offered, of which an [sic] European has scarce any conception: the hurricane, the burning winds, a ripe cane-piece on fire at midnight; an Indian prospect after a finished crop, and nature in all the extremes of tropic exuberance."

Grainger defines the scope of his work in the opening verses:

What soil the cane affects; what care demands;
Beneath what signs to plant; what ills await;
How the hot nectar best to christallize;
And Afric's sable progeny to keep:
A Muse, that long hath wander'd in the groves
Of myrtle-indolence, attempts to sing.

Like Virgil's Georgics, the work is organized in four books, of which the first describes the conditions most favourable for planting and cultivating sugar cane, focusing on the landscape, soil, wildlife and climate in St. Kitts, which at that time was considered one of the most favourable islands for sugar production. The second book is addressed to his fellow poet, the landscape gardener William Shenstone. There Grainger discusses various threats to the growth and health of the sugar-cane, which include natural disasters such as hurricanes and earthquakes. The third book deals with the harvest of the cane and the sugar-boiling process, while the fourth book gives an account of slave culture on the plantations.

The title page of the original edition

Although Grainger's The Sugar Cane remains the best known 18th century poem on a West Indian subject, others were written both before and after it. Nathaniel Weekes' Barbados, a poem (1754) was a forerunner that also included a consideration of sugar cane. Not long after the appearance of Grainger's work, John Singleton published A general description of the West Indian islands (1767) in which he paid tribute to the poem as a successful model. Later there was also a sideways allusion to Grainger in the anonymous Jamaica, a poem in three parts (1777), where the "Argument" to part one declares that "The Muse thinks it disgraceful in a Briton to sing of the Sugar-cane, since it is owing the Slavery of the Negroes".

Grainger himself, besides placing his poem within the tradition of English adaptations of the georgic in his introduction, also echoed a passage from one of them at a critical point in the body of the text. The description of the harvesters dancing after the apple crop is gathered in John Philips' Cyder is adapted to a similar scene among the plantation Negroes. Where Philips’ harvesters "frisk and bound", Grainger's "gay troop…frisks and capers" while "shaking their sable [or in Philips their brawny] limbs". In both places the males steal kisses from their female partners, which are received scornfully "with neck reclin’d". By such deliberate allusions Grainger affirms the place of his "West-India georgic" in the British tradition of such writing, and not simply as an isolated piece of colourful Caribbeana.

The Oxford Handbook of British Poetry comments on the dynamics of the poem that "at the same time as presenting the West Indies as an extension of the British nation, The Sugar Cane also implicitly confirms David Hume's observations regarding the way that trade and travel can undermine the distinction between nations: it depicts the West Indies as a crucible in which the goods, peoples and languages of numerous nations have been mixed….Grainger's poem, a veritable encyclopedia of information about local flora, fauna, diseases and cures, including names and etymological derivations from English, French, Spanish, Arabic, and the local language, embodies the miscegenous results of colonialism."

One problem that all the writers of British georgics had in common was contemporary interpretations of the Classical model they were following, particularly in the matter of diction, where the use of specialised terms and low concepts were deprecated. In 1697 Joseph Addison had published his "Essay on Virgil's Georgics", in which he particularly commended Virgil for the avoidance of these through a poetic technique whereby "He delivers the meanest of his precepts with a kind of grandeur, he breaks the clods and tosses the dung about with an air of gracefulness". At one point Grainger drafted this sentiment directly into his poem in lines he later rejected, "The Muse on Lowliness can Worth impart:/ And scatter dung with conscious Majesty", although ultimately preferring to scatter the low word abundantly about in his advice on the management of the soil. Conscious also of mediating unfamiliar landscapes and products, he was not shy of naming the island's profuse and unfamiliar flora and fauna ... humming birds, prickly pears and wild liquorice (1.526-540) ... and annotated them minutely. Once again, his precedent was the practice of his forerunners in the English georgic, of which one example is the list of antipathetic plants in Cyder.

Grainger's poem was reprinted many times, the last being in 1836, when such writing was already falling out of favour. It was not until after a century and a half of disparagement, during which most 18th century writing was undervalued (unless it could be perceived as a precursor to Romanticism), that The Sugar-Cane saw its first modern edition in Thomas Krise's Caribbeana: An Anthology of English Literature of the West Indies, 1657-1777. It was followed in 2000 by John Gilmore's critical edition, The Poetics of Empire: A Study of James Grainger's The Sugar Cane. Since then, there has been a steady stream of new scholarly articles and book chapters dedicated to Grainger and his major work.

== Slavery ==
Grainger's presentation of West Indian slavery in The Sugar-Cane appeared a little before formal agitation against the slave trade in England but was informed by his reading of advanced thinkers who questioned its validity, such as Adam Smith's The Theory of Moral Sentiments (1759) and George Wallace's A System of the Principles of the Laws of Scotland (1760). Indeed, he himself raised the question whether as "Servants, not slaves; of choice and not compell'd;/ The blacks should cultivate the Cane-land isles," (IV.242-3) but without providing an answer.

In his otherwise favourable review in the Critical Quarterly, Dr Johnson was uneasy about the poem's ambivalence. Of Book IV, dealing with the economics of slave culture, he commented that "that tenderness and humanity, with which the former part of the poem seems replete, is, in some measure, forgotten. The poet talks of this ungenerous commerce without the least appearance of detestation; but proceeds to direct these purchasers of their fellow-creatures with the same indifference that a groom would give instructions for chusing an horse." Modern judgements also point out the discrepancy between Grainger's liberal sentiments and the practical advice on the management of "Afric’s sable progeny", proving The Sugar Cane "ultimately rooted in a form of poetic failure". For such critics, the continual evasions in the body of the poem hide who is responsible for the work of sugar production behind poetic conventions that "require Grainger to maintain the fiction that slavery is a formal problem of poetry rather than an ethical problem in the world".

While admitting this, his editor John Gilmore has pointed out that many nineteenth-century writers who criticized Grainger for his depiction of slavery did not object to Virgil's writing about his own slave-tended estates.

== Bibliography ==
- Monique Allewaert, "Insect Poetics: Or, How James Grainger's Fraught Personifications Presage Enlightenments Not Taken", 2016
- Anna M. Foy, “Grainger and the 'Sordid Master’: Plantocratic Alliance in The Sugar-Cane and Its Manuscript", The Review of English Studies, Volume 68, Issue 286, September 2017, pp.708–733 abstract
- John Gilmore, The Poetics of Empire: A Study of James Grainger's The Sugar Cane, The Athlone Press 2000
- James Grainger, The Sugar Cane, London 1764
- Michael Morris, "Archipelagic Poetics", ch.2 in Scotland and the Caribbean, C.1740-1833: Atlantic Archipelagos, Routledge 2015, pp.71-97
- Carl Plasa, "Muse suppress the tale": James Grainger's The Sugar Cane and the poetry of refinement", ch.1 in, Slaves to Sweetness: British and Caribbean Literatures of Sugar, Liverpool University 2013, pp.8-32
- Keith A. Sandiford, "Grainger: creolizing the muse", ch.3 in The Cultural Politics of Sugar: Caribbean Slavery and Narratives of Colonialism, Cambridge University 2004, pp.67-87
- Cristobal Silva, Georgic Fantasies: James Grainger and the Poetry of Colonial Dislocation, ELH, Volume 83, Number 1, Spring 2016, pp. 127-156
- Steven W. Thomas, "Doctoring Ideology: James Grainger's The Sugar Cane and the Bodies of Empire", Early American Studies Vol. 4, No. 1 (University of Pennsylvania Press, Spring 2006), 78-111
