= Keith Sandiford =

Keith Sandiford may refer to:

- Keith A. Sandiford (born 1947), Barbadian writer living in the US
- Keith A. P. Sandiford (born 1936), Barbadian writer living in Canada
