= William Gilpin (priest) =

English artist, cleric and author (1724–1804)

The Reverend William Gilpin
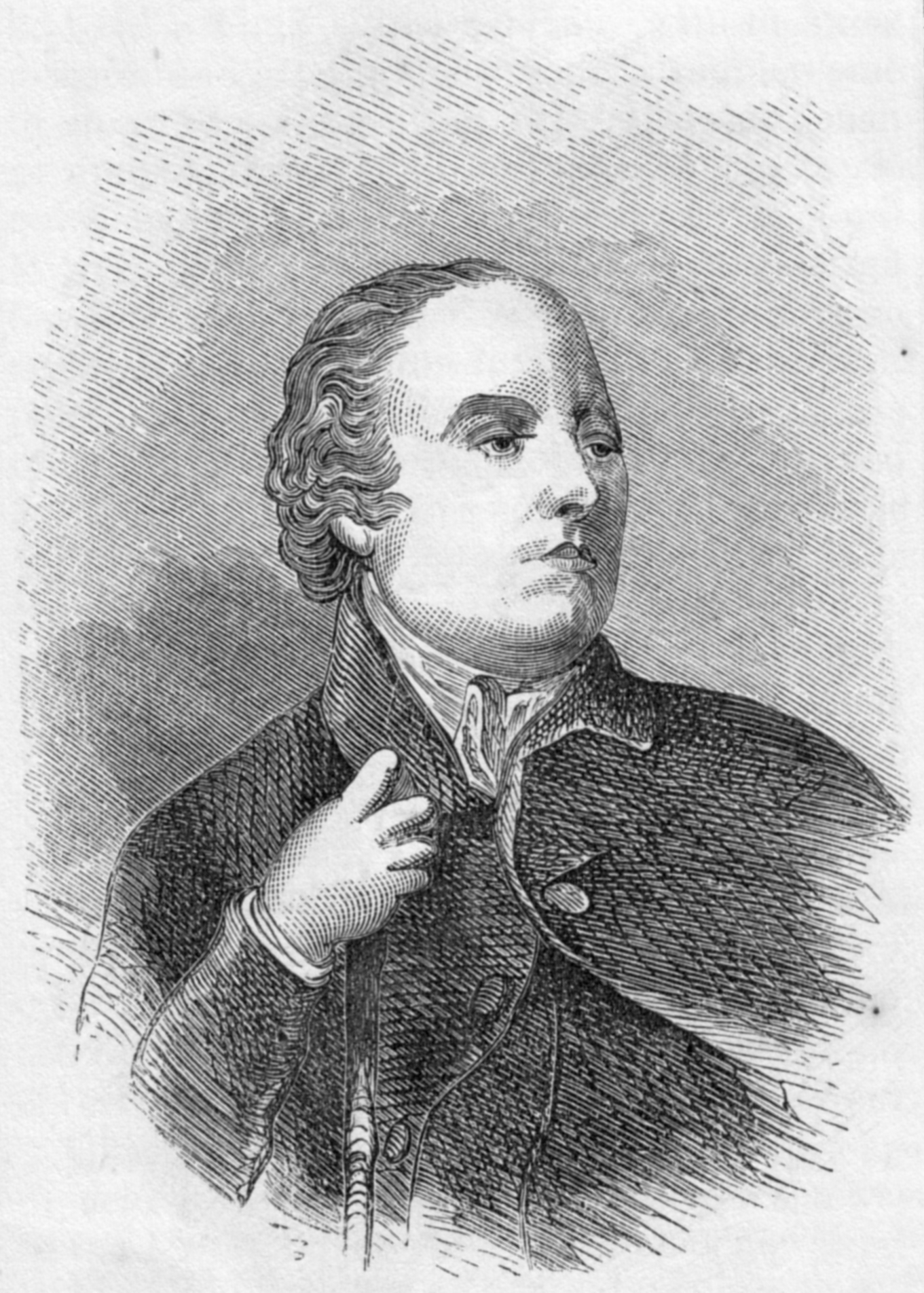
- An engraving of Gilpin from 1869
- Born: 4 June 1724; Cumberland, England
- Died: 5 April 1804 (aged 79); Boldre, Hampshire, England
- Education: Cheam School
- Occupation: British artist
- Relatives: Sawrey Gilpin (brother); William Sawrey Gilpin (nephew)

William Gilpin (4 June 1724 – 5 April 1804) was an English artist, Church of England cleric, schoolmaster and author. He is most notable as a travel writer and as one of those who originated the idea of the picturesque.

== Life ==
Gilpin was born in Cumberland, the son of Captain John Bernard Gilpin, a soldier and amateur artist. From an early age he was an enthusiastic painter, sketcher and collector of prints. However, while his brother Sawrey Gilpin became a full-time professional painter, William opted for a career in the church, graduating from Queen's College, Oxford in 1748.

While still at Oxford, Gilpin anonymously published A Dialogue upon the Gardens... at Stow in Buckinghamshire (1748). Part guidebook to Stowe, part essay on aesthetics, it shows that Gilpin had already begun to develop his ideas on the picturesque. Unusually for the time, Gilpin showed an appreciation of wild and rugged mountain scenery, perhaps rooted in his Cumbrian upbringing. Even more unusually, he expressed ideas about the perception of beauty which were purely aesthetic and often divorced from other qualities of the object viewed, such as morality or utility. He is credited with helping to originate the idea of the “picturesque”, producing many pictures in this style. The British Museum holds 113 object of his including many of his drawings. Interestingly, an album of his paintings in the picturesque style was sold at Christie's in 2008 for nearly £10,000.

After working as curate, Gilpin became a master and, from 1755, headmaster at Cheam School. Perhaps influenced by the premature death of his great-uncle, Richard Gilpin (born 1664) "from a blow of his schoolmaster", he was an enlightened educationalist, instituting a system of fines rather than corporal punishment and encouraging the boys to keep gardens and in-school shops. His broad intention was to promote "uprightness and utility" and give his pupils "a miniature of the world they were afterwards to enter".

As an educator, he has been compared to his contemporary David Manson, who in his grammar school in Belfast sought to exclude "drudgery and fear" through the use of play, outdoor activity and peer tutoring. Like Manson, Gilpin appears to have foreshadowed some of the experiments usually ascribed to the school of educationalists inspired by Rousseau, but there is no evidence that he (or Manson) was influenced by Continental theorists.

Gilpin stayed at Cheam until 1777, when he moved with his wife Margaret to become vicar of Boldre in the New Forest, Hampshire. While there he took as a child pupil the future poet Caroline Anne Bowles. Another pupil was his nephew, the painter William Sawrey Gilpin. He was succeeded at Cheam by his second son, another William Gilpin (1757-1848, headmaster 1777–1805).

William Gilpin died at Boldre, Hampshire, on 5 April 1804 and was buried there on 13 April. He was survived by his wife, Margaret (1725 – 14 July 1807), to whom he was married for over 50 years. His older son, John Bernard (1754-1851) became British Consul for Rhode Island. His two daughters, both named Margaret, died in infancy (1756 and 1759).

== Picturesque ==
In 1768 Gilpin published a popular Essay on Prints, where he defined the picturesque as "that kind of beauty which is agreeable in a picture" and began to expound his "principles of picturesque beauty", based largely on his knowledge of landscape painting. During the late 1760s and 1770s, Gilpin travelled extensively in the summer holidays and applied his principles to the landscapes he saw, committing his thoughts and spontaneous sketches to notebooks.

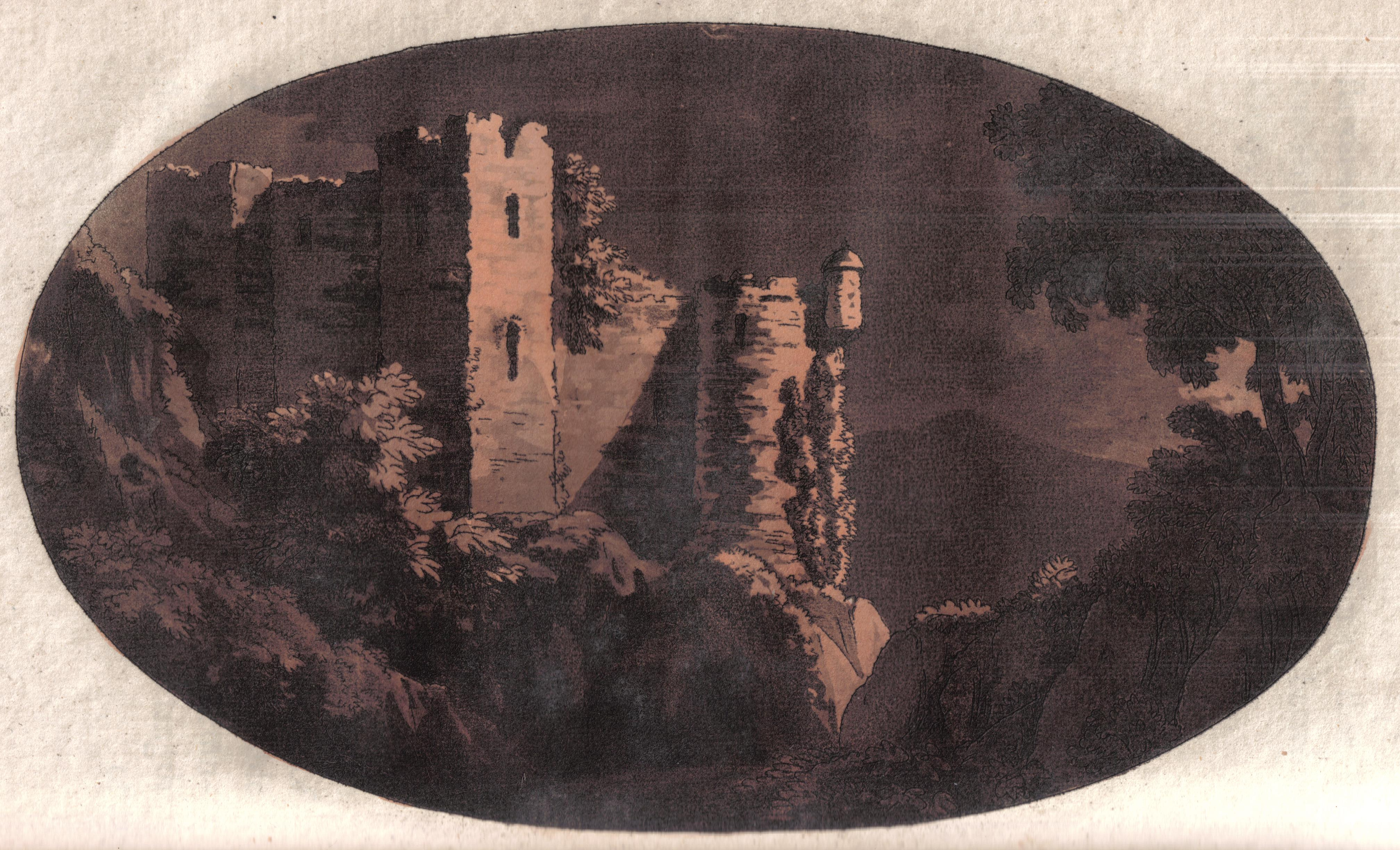
Penrith Castle in 1772 from Gilpin's book on Cumberland and Westmoreland.

Gilpin's tour journals circulated in manuscript to friends such as the poet William Mason and a wider circle including Thomas Gray, Horace Walpole and King George III. In 1782, at Mason's instigation, Gilpin published Observations on the River Wye and several parts of South Wales, etc. relative chiefly to Picturesque Beauty; made in the summer of the year 1770 (London 1782). This was illustrated with plates based on Gilpin's sketches, etched by his nephew William Sawrey Gilpin using the newly invented aquatint process. There followed Observations on the Lake District and the West of England, and after his move to Boldre, Remarks on Forest Scenery, and other woodland Views... (London, 1791).

Gilpin's watercolour technique has been compared with that of Alexander Cozens. Both texture and composition were important in a "correctly picturesque" scene. The texture should be "rough", "intricate", "varied" or "broken", without obvious straight lines. The composition should work as a unified whole, incorporating several elements: a dark "foreground" with a "front screen" or "side screens", a brighter middle "distance", and at least one further, less distinctly depicted "distance". A ruined abbey or castle would add "consequence". A low viewpoint that tended to emphasise the "sublime" was always preferable to a prospect from on high. While Gilpin allowed that nature was good at producing textures and colours, he saw it as rarely capable of creating the perfect composition. Some extra help from the artist, perhaps a carefully placed tree, was usually required.

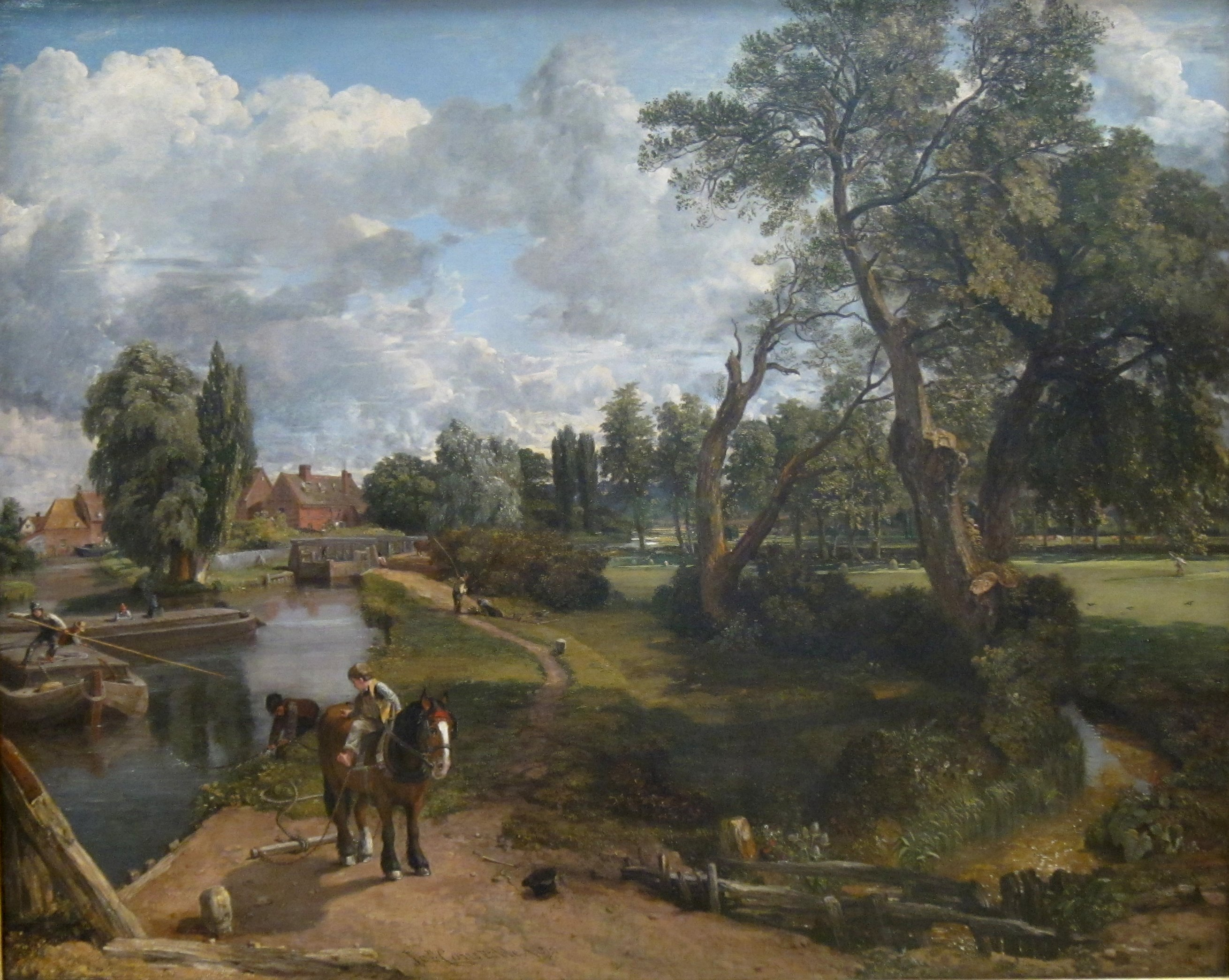
John Constable's paintings embody the picturesque ideals.

Unlike other travel writers of his time such as Thomas Pennant, Gilpin included little history and few facts or anecdotes. Even Gilpin's descriptions can seem quite vague, concentrating on how scenery conformed to picturesque principles rather than its specifics. In a much-quoted passage, Gilpin took things to an extreme, suggesting that "a mallet judiciously used" might render the insufficiently ruinous gable of Tintern Abbey more picturesque. In the same work he criticised John Dyer's description of the view from Grongar Hill for giving a distant object too much detail. Such passages were easy pickings for satirists such as Jane Austen, as she showed in Northanger Abbey and other novels and works. (Elizabeth Bennet, in Pride and Prejudice, notably refuses to join Mr. Darcy and the Bingley sisters in a stroll with the teasing observation, "You are charmingly group'd, and... the picturesque would be spoilt by admitting a fourth.")

Although he came in for criticism, Gilpin had published at exactly the right time. Improved road communications and travel restrictions in continental Europe produced a burst of British domestic tourism in the 1780s and 1790s. Many such picturesque tourists were intent on sketching, or at least discussing what they saw in terms of landscape painting. Gilpin's works were the ideal companions for the new generation of travellers; they were written specifically for them and not intended as comprehensive travel guides.

== Legacy ==
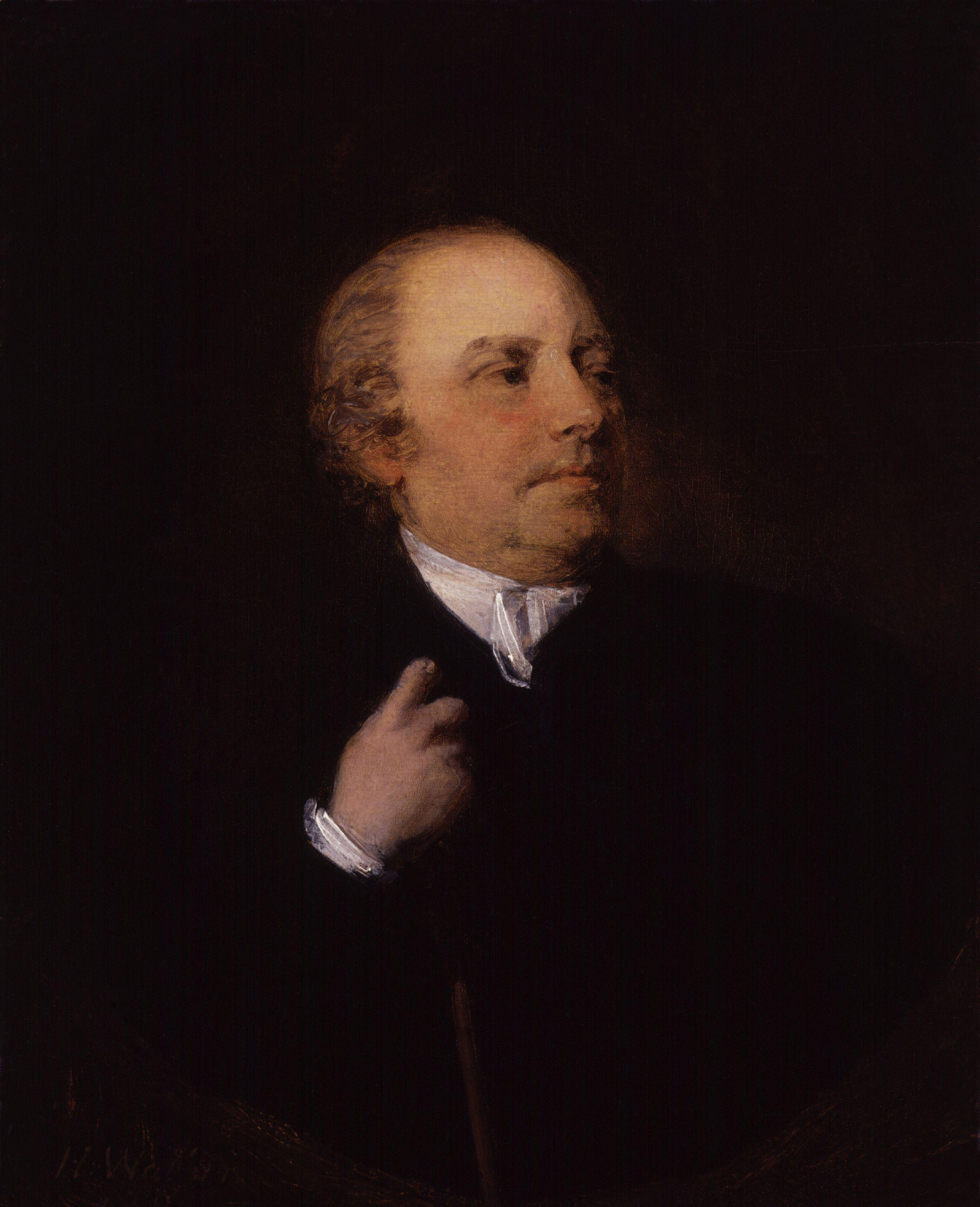
William Gilpin by Henry Walton

Although Gilpin sometimes commented on designed landscapes, the picturesque remained for him an essential set of rules for depicting nature. It was left to others, notably Richard Payne Knight, Uvedale Price and Thomas Johnes, to develop Gilpin's ideas into more comprehensive theories of the picturesque and apply these more generally to landscape design and architecture. Ultimately, these grand theories of wild natural beauty gave way to the tamer, more commercialised picturesque of the mid-19th century, though Gilpin's works remained popular and several new editions appeared with additions by John Heaviside Clark.

Gilpin also lives on as the model for the satirist William Combe's Tour of Dr Syntax in Search of the Picturesque (1809), illustrated by Thomas Rowlandson. This curate sets off on his straggly mare Grizzle in a quest for picturesque scenery, often (and usually to his discomfort) oblivious to the realities of the world around him.

As well as his picturesque writing, Gilpin published several works on moral and religious subjects, including biographies of Hugh Latimer, Thomas Cranmer and John Wycliffe. Some of the profit from his writing went on good works in his parish, including the endowment of a school at Boldre that now bears his name. Many of the manuscripts of his tours, including unpublished or recently published material, are now housed in the Bodleian Library, Oxford.

Gilpin is one of eight travellers included in Nicholas Crane's Great British Journeys.

== Works ==
=== On the picturesque ===
- Dialogue upon the gardens of the Right Honourable the Lord Viscount Cobham, at Stow in Buckinghamshire (1748)
- An essay on prints: containing remarks upon the principles of picturesque beauty; the different kinds of prints; and the characters of the most noted masters (1768)
- Observations on the River Wye, and several parts of South Wales, etc. relative chiefly to picturesque beauty; made in the summer of the year 1770 (1782)
- Observations, relative chiefly to picturesque beauty, made in the year 1772, on several parts of England; particularly the mountains, and lakes of Cumberland, and Westmoreland (1786)
- Observations, relative chiefly to picturesque beauty, made in the year 1776, on several parts of Great Britain; particularly the High-lands of Scotland (1789)
- Remarks on forest scenery, and other woodland views (relative chiefly to picturesque beauty), illustrated by the scenes of New Forest in Hampshire (1791)
- Three essays: on picturesque beauty; on picturesque travel; and on sketching landscape: to which is added a poem, On landscape painting (1792)
- Observations on the Western parts of England, relative chiefly to picturesque beauty; to which are added a few remarks on the picturesque beauties of the Isle of Wight (1798)
- Observations on the coasts of Hampshire, Sussex, and Kent, relative chiefly to picturesque beauty, relative to Picturesque Beauty, made in the Summer of the year 1774 (1804)
- Two essays: one on the author's mode of executing rough sketches; the other on the principles on which they are composed. To these are added, three plates of figures by S. Gilpin (1804)
- Observations on several parts of the counties of Cambridge, Norfolk, Suffolk, and Essex. Also on several parts of North Wales, relative to picturesque beauty in two tours, the former made in ... 1769, the latter in ... 1773 (1809)

=== Biographies ===
- The life of Bernard Gilpin: collected from his life written by George Carleton, bishop of Chichester, from other printed accounts of the times he lived in, from original letters, and other authentic records (1752)
- The life of Hugh Latimer, Bishop of Worcester (1755)
- The lives of John Wicliff; and of the most eminent of his disciples; Lord Cobham, John Huss, Jerome of Prague, and Zisca (1765)
- The life of Thomas Cranmer, archbishop of Canterbury (1784)
- Memoirs of Josias Rogers, Esq., Commander of his Majesty's Ship, Quebec (1808)

=== Religious works ===
- Lectures on the catechism of the Church of England (1779)
- Two sermons (1788)
- An exposition of the New Testament, intended as an introduction to the study of the Scriptures, by pointing out the leading Sense and Connection of the sacred writers (1790)
- Three dialogues on the amusements of clergymen (1796)
- Moral contrasts; or, the power of religion, exemplified under different characters (1798)
- Sermons to a country congregation; to which are added, a few hints for sermons, intended chiefly for the use of the younger clergy (1799)
- Dialogues, on various subjects (1807)
