= Anthony Rudd =

British bishop (died 1615)

Anthony Rudd (c.1549 – 1615) was a Welsh bishop.

== Life ==
He graduated B.A. from Trinity College, Cambridge in 1567, and M.A. in 1570.

He became Dean of Gloucester in 1584, and Bishop of St. David's in 1594. In 1596 he preached a celebrated sermon before Elizabeth I at Richmond Palace, in which he made extensive allusions to her approaching old age (she was 63 in 1596, and he made play of this as the astrology, on his text “O teach us to number our days”) and physical signs of it. Thomas Fuller in his Church History of Britain claims that this sermon, and a later one in 1602, offended the Queen, one of his sources being Sir John Harrington's account. Anecdotally John Whitgift is supposed to have led Rudd on to preach plainly, and Rudd lost the succession as Archbishop of Canterbury by so doing, but Whitgift survived Elizabeth in any case.

He attended the Hampton Court Conference of 1604; he was sympathetic to Puritanism.

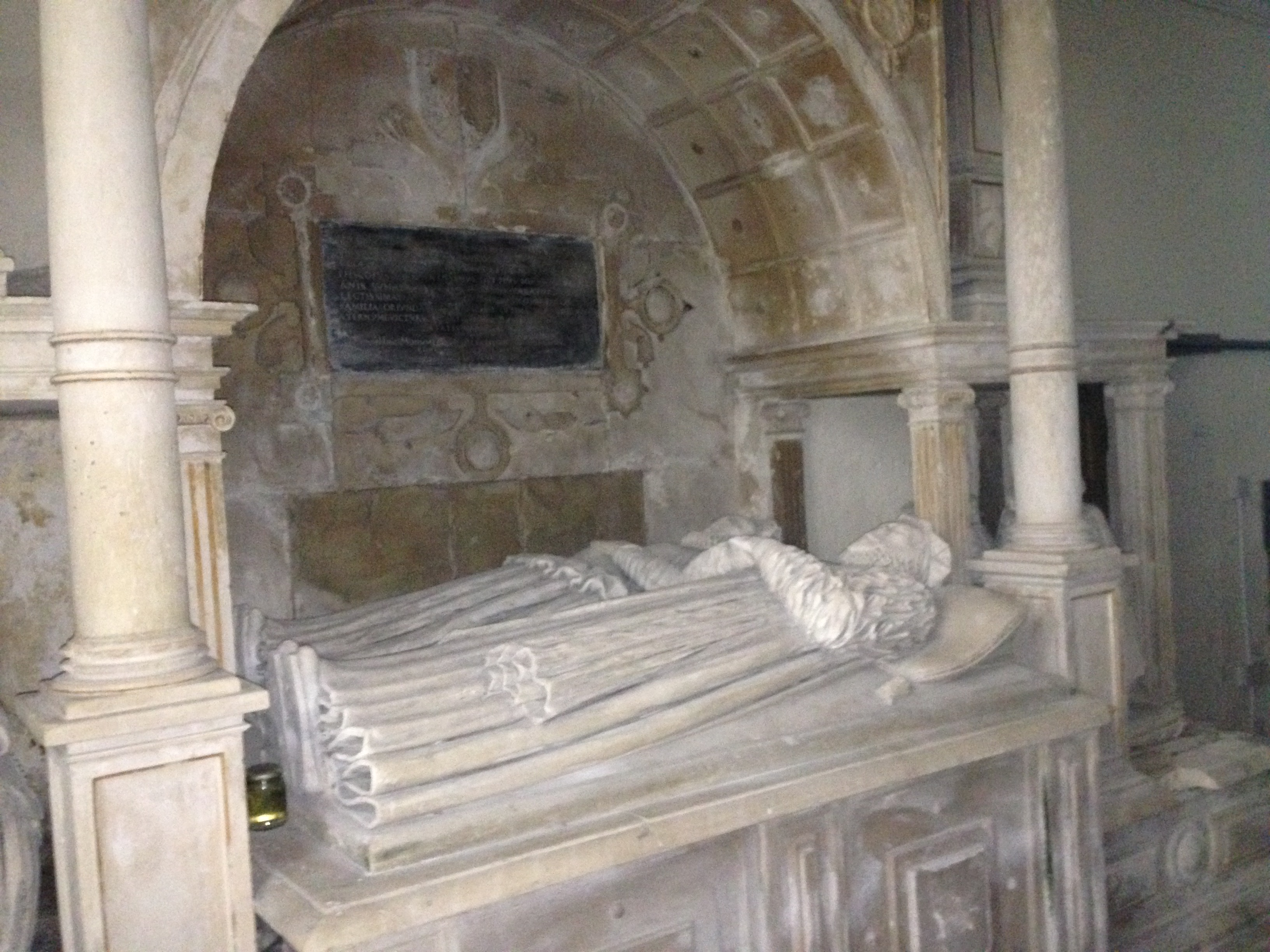
Tomb of Anthony Rudd, Bishop of St. David's (c.1549-1615) and Anne Rudd, St Cathe's Church at Llangathen, Carmarthenshire, Wales.

He is buried in the church at Llangathen, where his wife erected a “bedstead” tomb. Rudd had acquired adjacent property at Aberglasney.

== Works ==
The early English comedy Misogonus has been attributed to him, without complete certainty. It was acted at Trinity College between 1568 and 1574.

Church of England titles
Preceded by Marmaduke Middleton	Bishop of St David's; 1594–1615	Succeeded by Richard Milbourne
