= Llangathen =

Village and community in Carmarthenshire, Wales

Coordinates: 51°53′N 4°03′W

- Village and community
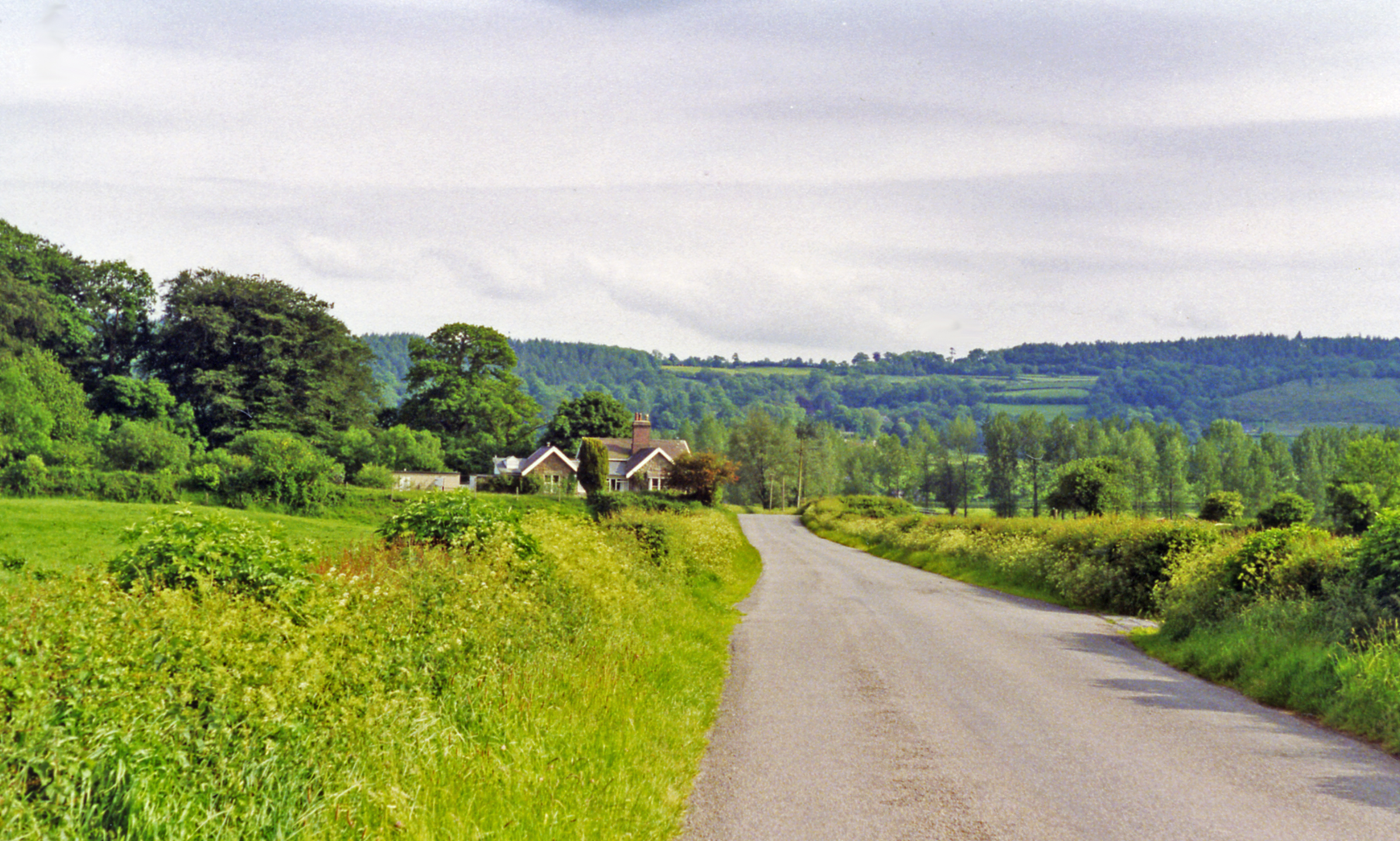

- Location within Carmarthenshire
- Community: Llangathen
- Principal area: Carmarthenshire
- Country: Wales
- Sovereign state: United Kingdom
- Post town: Carmarthen
- Postcode district: SA32
- Police: Dyfed-Powys
- Fire: Mid and West Wales
- Ambulance: Welsh
- UK Parliament: Caerfyrddin
- List of places UK Wales Carmarthenshire Map of the community

Llangathen (Welsh pronunciation) is a village and community located in Carmarthenshire, Wales. The community includes the hamlet of Cilsân. The population taken at the 2011 census was 507.

The parish church of St Cathen is a Grade II* listed building and houses the tomb of Anthony Rudd, an Elizabethan Bishop of St David's who owned Aberglasney House and developed its gardens in the late 16th century. The churchyard has some ancient yew trees.

Within the parish is the country house and garden of Aberglasney, also a Grade II* listed building, which once belonged to the Dyer family. It lies at the foot of Grongar Hill, the celebrated subject of a poem by John Dyer published in 1726. The community is also home of Dryslwyn Castle.

The community is bordered by the communities of: Manordeilo and Salem; Llandeilo; Llanfihangel Aberbythych; Llanarthney; Llanegwad; and Llanfynydd, all being in Carmarthenshire.

Allt y wern, a broadleaf woodland and Site of Special Scientific Interest (SSSI) is to the south-west of the village.
