= Aberglasney =

House in Carmarthenshire, Wales

Coordinates: 51.879511°N 4.062723°W

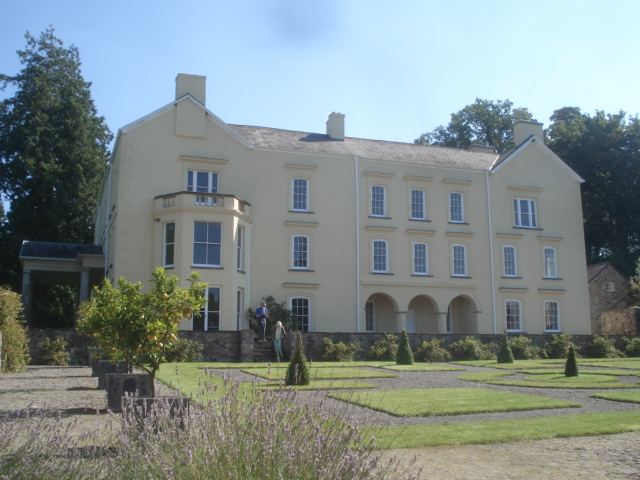
Aberglasney House Viewed from the Cloister Garden

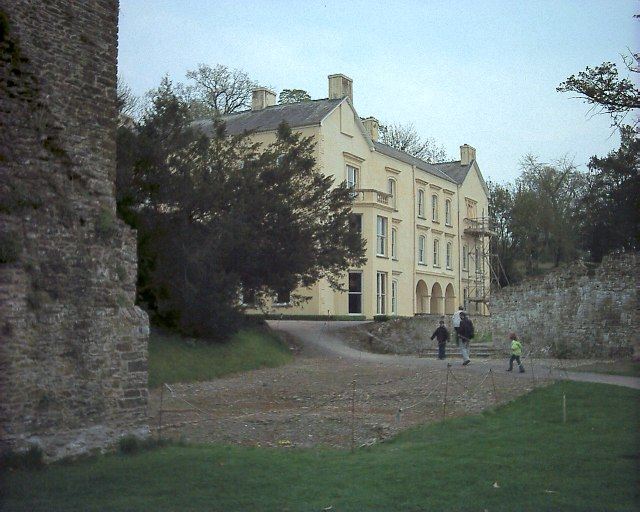
Aberglasney House

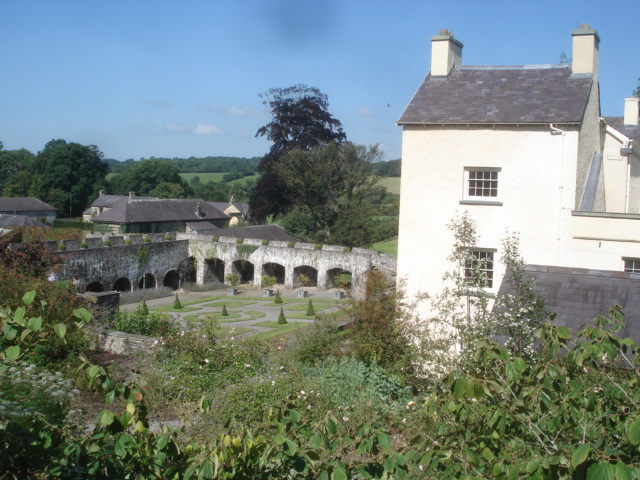
Aberglasney House and gardens

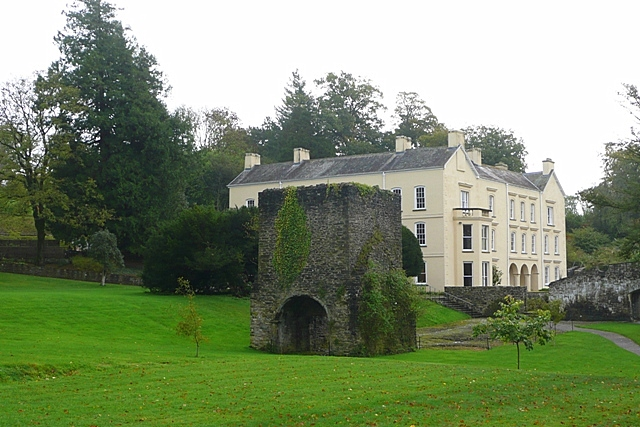
Aberglasney House, view from the gate

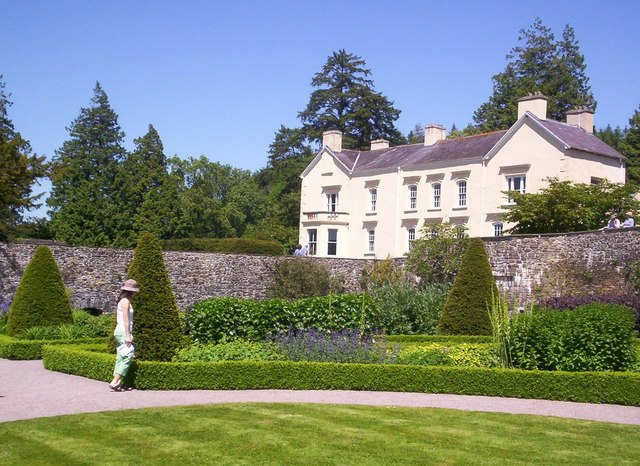
Aberglasney garden, with Aberglasney House in the background

Aberglasney House and Gardens is a medieval house and gardens set in the Tywi valley in the parish of Llangathen, Carmarthenshire, West Wales. It is owned and run by Aberglasney Restoration Trust, a registered charity. The house is a Grade II* listed building and the gardens are listed, also at Grade II*, on the Cadw/ICOMOS Register of Parks and Gardens of Special Historic Interest in Wales.

== Location ==
Aberglasney is located just off the busy A40 road between Llandeilo and Carmarthen town, 3 miles (4.8 km) from Llandeilo.

== History ==
The site was owned for ten generations of a family which by tradition could trace its origins to Elystan Glodrydd "Prince between Wye and Severn," and Gwenllian, granddaughter of Hywel Dda. After the triumphant return of Henry Tudor at the Battle of Bosworth, then owner William ap Thomas who was knighted by the king for his service, gained formal responsibilities in both North and South Wales, and decided to move permanently north to Coed Helen on the North Wales coast.

He sold what was then known as Llys Wen to members of the Rudd family sometime around 1600. Funded by the recently appointed Anthony Rudd (c. 1548–1614), Bishop of St David's Cathedral from 1594, the house was reconstructed in 1603, a time when it also probably gained its still standing Elizabethan promenade garden, the best preserved of its type in all of Great Britain. The house stayed in the family's hands for a few generations, but allegiance to the crown during the English Civil War and high hearth tax (with 13 chimneys, the highest paid in all of Carmarthenshire), the house was eventually bought by Robert Dyer, a successful Carmarthen lawyer, in 1710.

Dyer who was thought to have been living in the property at this time, had the house "rebuilt," although later investigation suggests he improved it greatly including the additional of a Queen Anne style facade. Dyer died before the works were completed in 1720, succeeded by his eldest son Robert, who married Frances Croft of Croft Castle, descended from Owain Glyndŵr. Pictures of the couple within the house are thought to have been painted by his brother, then painter and poet John Dyer. In 1726, John published two poems referencing Aberglasney: "The Country Walk" about Aberglasney, and "Grongar Hill" describing the Tywi valley. After ownership under mounting debts, the estate was put up for sale in 1798.

In 1803, the house was bought by John Philips, a lawyer from Llandeilo, on behalf of his brother Thomas, a surgeon returning home after a 30-year career as a surgeon with the East India Company. He and his married mistress lived in the house, and dying childless in 1824 left the property to his sister's son John Walters, who added Philipps to his surname and a portico to the Queen Anne façade. He had a son who died in childhood and three daughters, two of whom died leaving the property to be inherited by the middle daughter. Her daughter Mary Anne (also known as Marianne), inherited the property, while her father John Pugh Pryse of Bwlchbychan remarried Decima Dorothea Rice of Llwynybrain, after the death of Mary Anne's mother. The Yew tree promenade was the subject of a Gardeners' Chronicle article in 1860.

Marianne Pryse married soldier Charles Mayhew, and moving with him to Derbyshire, Aberglasney was let out. After his retirement in 1902, they moved to Aberglasney, where Colonel Mayhew planted the rare specimen trees that remain in the grounds. The couple were the local co-ordinators for the teetotalism movement, holding Temperance rallies, giving Llangathen its Temperance Hall, and turning out tenants who declined to sign the Pledge. Colonel Mayhew died in 1907, and in 1908 Marianne moved to London, where she spent the rest of her life, refusing to let out Aberglasney. She died in 1939.

Aberglasney was commandeered at the outbreak of World War II, becoming a mobile laundry for the RAOC. As the build-up to D Day occurred, the house was used as a holding-station for troops of the US Army, which included the sparring partner of Joe Louis, Top Sergeant Dawson. A stray Luftwaffe bomb fell on the property, after a raid on Swansea docks, in a field towards Lanlash.

After the end of World War II, a descendant of Decima Dorothea Rice, Eric Evans and his young family took up residence. But on his death in 1950, aged 30, the family trustees decided that the property was not economic, and hence decided to sell it.

== Present day ==
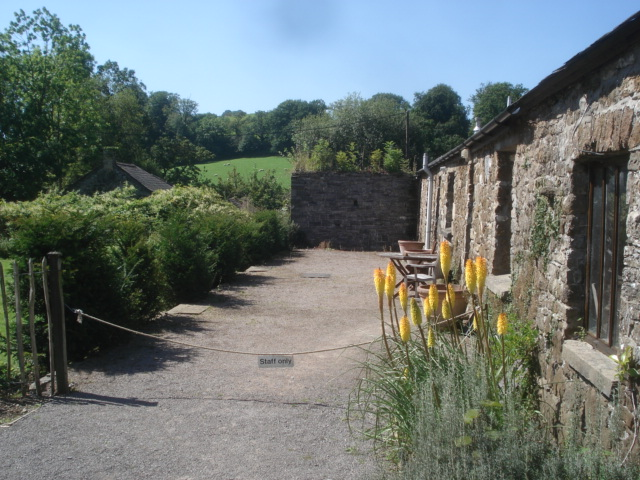
Cottages and offices at Aberglasney Garden

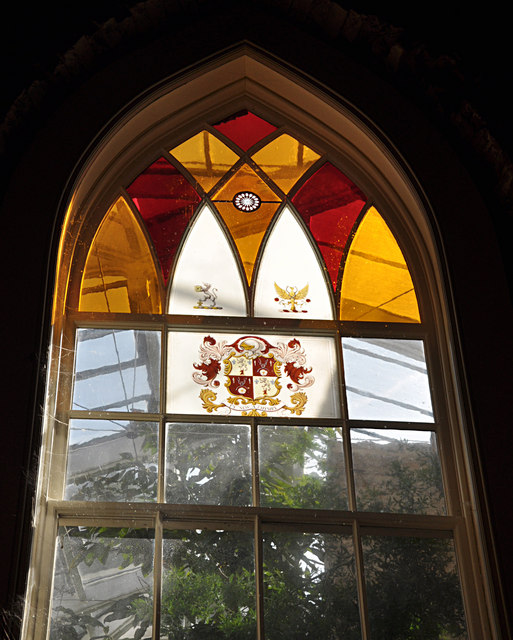
Stained glass window at Aberglasney House. The ninfarium glasshouse can be seen behind it

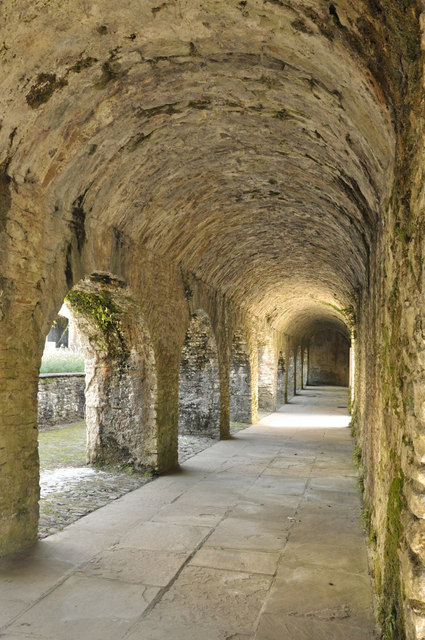
The Cloisters - Aberglasney House

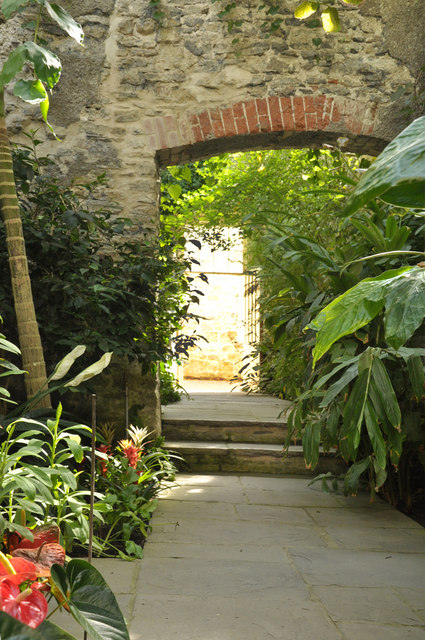
The ninfarium (tropical glasshouse) at Aberglasney Gardens

In 1955 the estate was broken up, with tenant farmers acquiring their rented land, while the house and farm was bought by Carmarthen lawyer David Charles. The house remained unoccupied, used occasionally for dances and balls, allowing the damp and decay that had set in under Marianne Pryce's ownership to accelerate. A further sale in 1977 reduced the size of the surrounding lands, in part to fund what became a short-lived effort to restore what was now a vandalised property that was subject to regular architectural theft. When the owners joined this effort by trying to sell the portico legally via Christie's auctioneers, the Welsh Office stepped in with a full prosecution to preserve the listed building. In 1995 a transfer was agreed with the Aberglasney Restoration Trust. As the house restoration had already started, it was ineligible for the BBC's Restoration series, and so director William Wilkins appealed to United States horticulturalists and benefactors Frank and Ann Cabot.

The 10 acres (4.0 ha) gardens opened to the public in July 1999, with several walled gardens:

- Elizabethan/Jacobean Cloister garden and rare parapet walk at its centre
- Cloister Garden, which based on an archaeological survey in 1999 took the possible age of the site back to the 13th century, with the discovery of a silver Long Cross Penny dating to the reign of Edward I
- Upper Walled Garden, designed by Penelope Hobhouse
- Ninfarium award-winning garden based on the Garden of Ninfa, south-east of Rome, built within the central ruins of the mansion and filled with a wide variety of exotic plants.

The gardens host a daffodil collection with over 450 varieties, and were the site of the BBC's Antiques Roadshow in 2009.

== See also ==
- List of gardens in Wales
