= James Grainger =

Scottish medical doctor, poet and translator (c. 1721–1766)

James Grainger (c. 1721–1766) was a Scottish medical doctor, poet and translator. He settled on St. Kitts from 1759 until his death of a fever on 16 December 1766. As a writer, he is best known for his poem The Sugar Cane, which is now valued as an important historical document.

== Early years and military career ==
James Grainger was born about 1721 in Duns, Berwickshire, the son of John Grainger, a former tax collector of Cumbrian origin. After studying medicine at Edinburgh University, he served as a surgeon's mate with John Hadzor under Harry Pulteney with the Pulteney's Regiment of Foot during the 1745 Rebellion. Despite his father having Jacobite sympathies, James had strong Hanoverian views. He attained the rank of surgeon in June 1746 and went on to serve in Holland until the end of the War of the Austrian Succession in 1748. He remained on the armies rolls for several years, although he appears to have travelled to Italy, probably on leave from the army. In 1753 he was in Edinburgh Edinburgh, where he graduated as Doctor of Medicine. He sold his army commission and then set up practice in London.

== Literary career ==
Entering literary circles, he befriended Samuel Johnson, William Shenstone, Thomas Percy and other authors. Grainger's first English poem, "Solitude: an ode", appeared in 1755. In May, 1756, he commenced writing in the Monthly Review, contributing articles chiefly on poetry and drama until 1758. He also published a medical work in Latin drawing on his army experience, namely an account of fevers encountered during his military service and on venereal diseases (Historia Febris Intermittentis Anomalæ Batavæ Annorum 1746, 1747, 1748: Accedunt Monita Syphilitica, Edinburgh 1757), as well as some other essays.

In 1758 his Poetical Translation of the Elegies of Tibullus and of the Poems of Sulpicia appeared in two volumes and was to be republished several times over the next century. Begun while he was still with the army, the work was prefaced with a brief life of the Latin poet and was dedicated to John Bourryau, with whom Grainger was soon to travel to the West Indies. The accompanying voluminous notes that crowd out the text were dismissed in a review by Tobias Smollett as "a huge farrago of learned lumber, jumbled together to very little purpose, seemingly calculated to display the translator's reading", and launched an acrimonious war of words between the former friends.

== Colonial career ==
In 1759 Grainger set out for the West Indian island of St. Kitts. On the voyage out he attended Louisa Burt, the widow of William Pym Burt, and married her daughter Daniel Mathew Burt shortly after arriving. By this he joined a family of plantation owners, having married the sister of William Mathew Burt, the island's governor, but did not gain a substantial dowry. Made manager of the estate of Daniel Mathew, his wife's cousin, he continued his medical practice as well. His georgic poem The Sugar Cane was completed by 1762 and represents all he had learned on that subject, and about his new home in general. As with his translation of Tibullus, at least half of the text was made up of explanatory footnotes. James Boswell recalled in his Life of Johnson that upon a reading of this poem he "had made all the assembled wits burst into a laugh, when, after much blank-verse pomp, the poet began a new paragraph ... 'Now, Muse, let's sing of rats.'" The poem did not appear until 1764, during a brief return visit to London. That year also, Grainger published anonymously his pioneering Essay on the more common West-India Diseases and the remedies which that country itself produces, to which are added some hints on the management of negroes. The only other poem surviving from this period was the ballad of "Bryan and Pereene", based on a local anecdote, which was published in Percy's Reliques.
