= John Dyer =

Welsh Church of England cleric, poet and painter

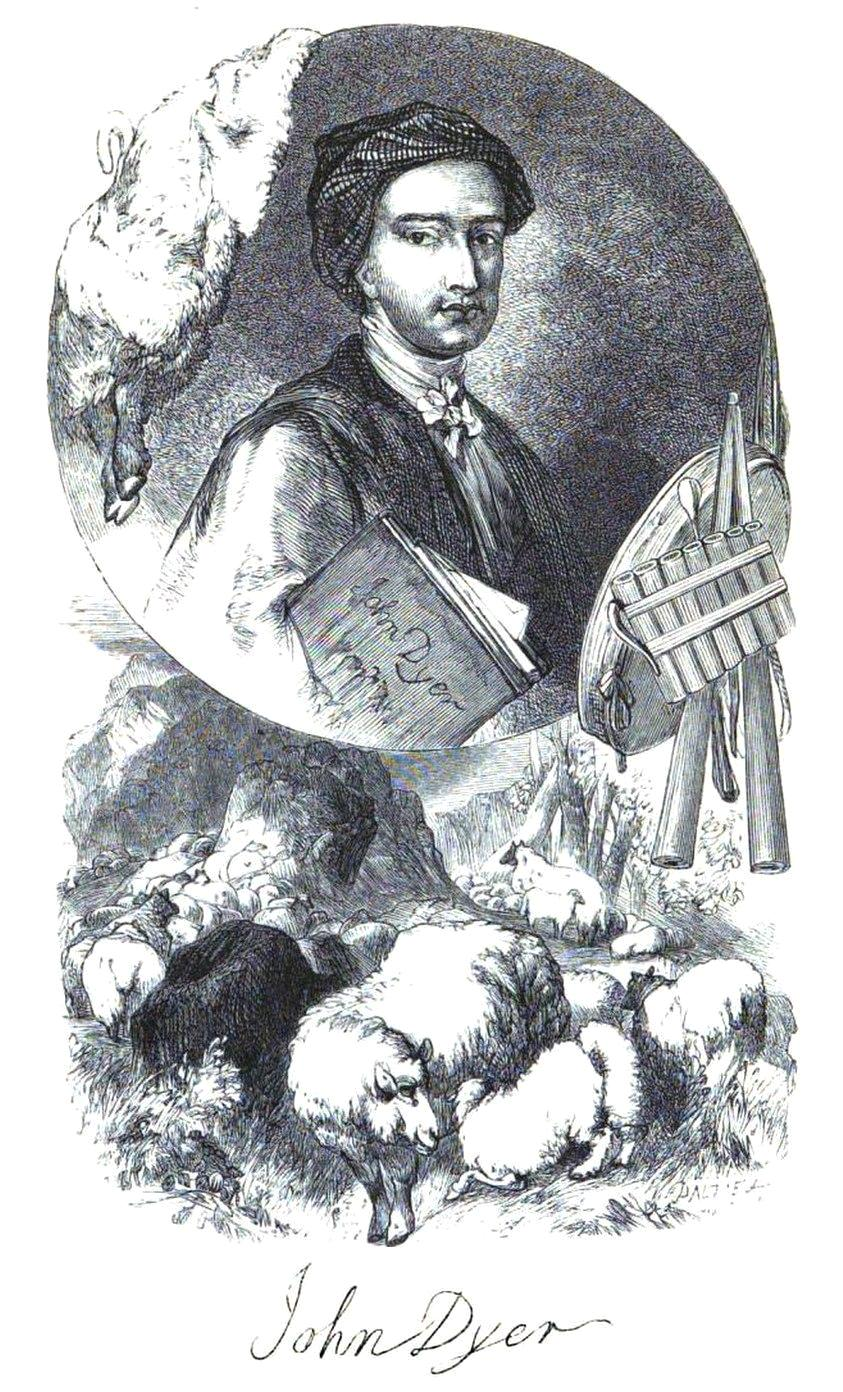
The Bard of the Fleece, a portrait provided by a relative and incorporated into a design engraved by the Brothers Dalziel, 1855

John Dyer (1699 – 15 December 1757) was a painter and Welsh poet who became a priest in the Church of England. He was most recognised for Grongar Hill, one of six early poems featured in a 1726 miscellany. Longer works published later include the less successful genre poems, The Ruins of Rome (1740) and The Fleece (1757). His work has always been more anthologised than published in separate editions, but his talent was later recognised by William Wordsworth among others.

== Life and career ==
=== Youth ===
John Dyer was the fourth of six children born to Robert and Catherine Cocks Dyer in Llanfynydd, Carmarthenshire, five miles from Grongar Hill. His exact birth date is unknown, but the earliest existing record of John Dyer dates his baptism on 13 August 1699 – within fourteen days after his birth as was the tradition of the time – in Llanfynnydd parish. His grandfather was churchwarden there and his father was a highly successful solicitor in Llanfynnydd and owned several properties in the neighbourhood. Presumably for financial opportunity and greater living space for six children, the family moved in 1710 to the mansion of Aberglasney in the nearby parish of Llangathen.

Dyer was first educated in an unknown school in the countryside before attending Westminster School under Dr. Robert Freind. Dyer's dislike for Westminster was chronicled in a 1714 entry in his Journal of Escapes: "Ran from school and my father, on a box of the ear being given me strolled for three or four days – found at Windsor." He retained little of what he learned, as evidenced later by his unfamiliarity with the Latin authors that were a school staple.

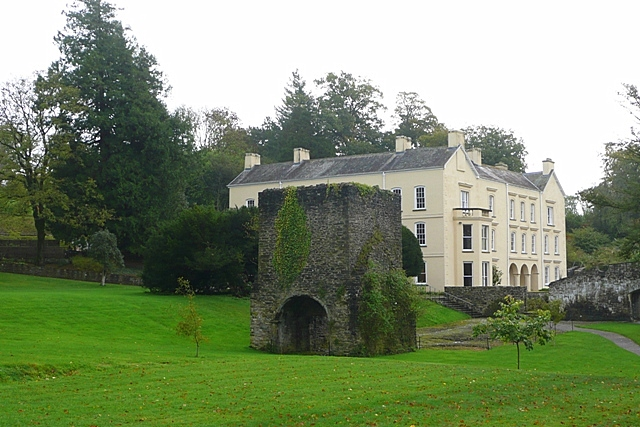
Aberglasney House, home of the Dyer family from 1710

After Westminster School, Dyer worked in his father's office, learning the business. His talent in the field of law was evidenced by the lawsuits in which he was involved and he was the only one of four sons to have managed his property well. John's father, who wanted his son to pursue a career as solicitor, subdued the poet's longing to channel his creativity through painting and writing. Ralph M. Williams comments that it was upon his return to Aberglasney "that we first begin to know something of his personality and see for the first time the conflict in him between the dreamy romantic and the practical man of business that runs through his life." Having grown up among the ancient stoneworks in the Aberglasney grounds, it was not surprising that Dyer had developed an interest in antiquities and the love of nature that characterises his work.

Robert Dyer's death on 8 July 1720 ended John's apprenticeship to the law and he was not named in his father's will, releasing him from handling the lawsuit riddled estate bequeathed to his brother, also called Robert. John then left Aberglasney for London in 1720 or 1721 to pursue painting and poetry.

=== Painting and poetry ===
In London, Dyer apprenticed himself under the artist Jonathan Richardson. Richardson's fundamental principle of painting was that all aspects of learning, from reading, observation of nature, studying works by masters in painting and writing poetry were necessary to provide artists with inspiration. As a result, Dyer retained such interests and translated his studies into verbal landscape art. His first attempt in writing Miltonic octosyllabic couplets was addressed to his mentor, "An Epistle to a Famous Painter", the same measure as in his second version of Grongar Hill. It was under Richardson that Dyer met his coffee house group of friends, Thomas Edwards, Daniel Wray, George Knapton and Arthur Pond. Pond would later be referred to in The Fleece (IV. 265).

Dyer, with Richardson's blessing, sailed to Italy in 1724 to continue his studies and made his way straight to Rome, where he admired its objects of antiquity. The Pantheon was a favourite building and preoccupied his time during the trip, while the Colosseum and the Baths of Caracalla were also held in high regard. Among sculptures and reliefs, he notes the Hercules, the Apollo, the "Venus de Medici," the Laocoön group, Trajan's Column, the temple of Pallas, the arches of Titus and Constantine and the Borghese Dancers (now in the Louvre). Such were the inspirations or objects of interest in Dyer's poem The Ruins of Rome, written in 1740. But though he appreciated the beauties about him, his staunch Protestantism was appalled by what he regarded as the superstitious practices of Catholicism: "God of our Fathers, keep us from the ways of these foul hirelings," he exclaimed in a poetic fragment written at the time.

To Aurelia

See, the flowery spring is blown,
Let us leave the smoky town;
From the mall, and from the ring,
Every one has taken wing;
Chloe, Strephon, Corydon,
To the meadows all are gone.
What is left you worth your stay?
Come, Aurelia, come away.

Come, Aurelia, come and see
What a lodge I've dressed for thee;
But the seat you cannot see,
'T is so hid with jessamy,
With the vine that o'er the walls,
And in every window crawls;
Let us there be blithe and gay!
Come, Aurelia, come away.

Come with all thy sweetest wiles,
With thy graces and thy smiles;
Come, and we will merry be,
Who shall be so blest as we?
We will frolic all the day,
Haste, Aurelia, while we may:
Ay! and should not life be gay?
Yes, Aurelia, — come away.

— By John Dyer

While there, Dyer fell ill with a malarial fever caught in the Campagna and began to contemplate his future. Resuming his journey northwards, he visited the ruins of Otricoli, where he found inspiration for his poem signifying this shift of mood, "Written at Ocriculum in Italy, 1725". Continuing on his journey to Florence, his visits to museums and buildings there instigated a shift in his interests from the classical to the Renaissance period to create one of his few surviving paintings, a copy of Antonio da Correggio's masterpiece, "Madonna Adoring the Christ Child."

On Dyer's return, a selection of six of his poems were published in Richard Savage's Miscellaneous Poems and Translations (1726), which largely consisted of the work of the coterie that had gathered about Aaron Hill, one of those literary groupings typical of the 18th century whose work interconnected and was often cross-referential. This was evident in the many 'collected' editions of Dyer's poems published after his death that were prefaced by poems addressed to him by these friends, in answer to or answered by the shorter poems of Dyer's placed at the end. Thus Dyer's poem "To Mr Savage, son of the late Earl Rivers", exhorting him to bear up under misfortune, is answered by Savage's "An epistle to My John Dyer in answer to his from the country". And Dyer's paean to living in country obscurity, "To a friend in town", becomes a Horatian exchange when complemented by Aaron Hill's "The Choice".

Another cluster of poems about Dyer's portrait of Martha Fowke, who went under the name of Clio in the group, is particularly rich. Both Dyer's "A Country Walk" and "The Inquiry" mention her with singular devotion. So also does "To Clio from Rome" (which remained uncollected in 18th century editions) with its reference to "the wreathed urn among the vines, whose form my pencil now designs." This comes aptly, since Dyer had recently painted her. Martha's reply apologises for her tardiness and compliments both his poetic and artistic tributes: "Your claim demands the bays in double wreath, Your poems lighten and your pictures breathe". Savage too paid his tribute "To Mr John Dyer, occasioned by seeing his picture of the celebrated Clio" in which, going beyond outward likeness, "You eye the Soul". The most that Dyer himself will admit in his epistle "To a Famous Painter" (his teacher Jonathan Richardson), also written from Rome, is the modest confession that "As yet I but in verse can paint".

Several later poems that only exist in manuscript were addressed to different ladies. His epistle "To Aurelia", another member of the coterie, is an appeal to "leave the smoky Town" with him for some rural retreat. Other poems cover pseudonymous flirtations with a Myra and a Celia.

=== Later life ===
Following his return to England after a year and half in Italy, and then the publication of his early poems in 1726, Dyer briefly returned to Aberglasney, where he became estranged from his brother Robert. The next several years were spent between London and Herefordshire or on painting trips. In 1734 he restored to profitability a rundown farm belonging to an aunt and spent several more years as a gentleman farmer in other counties. It was at this period too that Dyer began writing again. From then dates the anecdotal pastoral "My Ox Duke". He was also on the lookout for a suitable subject for a longer poem and began work on the unfinished fragment "The Cambro-Briton". Eventually, however, he fell back on the fruits of his Italian travels, published as The Ruins of Rome in 1740. It was only much later in his georgic The Fleece (1757) that he put to use the insight into the wool industry that he gained as a farmer.

The master theme of The Ruins of Rome had already suggested itself to Dyer in his earlier "Written at Ocriculum in Italy, 1725". Written in a mannered imitation of Miltonic blank verse, it opens with Dyer painting among the ruins, "studious to excel, of praise and fame ambitious". As night falls, a seer comes to remind him of his mortality by pointing to the downfallen architecture of the past. Instead he is exhorted to learn from the work of the eternal Creator spread in beauty across the skies and dedicate his life to goodness. The poem's religious conclusions were also to find expression in two unpublished poems of the 1750s, "A Night Prospect written on Lincoln Heath" and "On the Destruction of Lisbon".

Little is known about his paintings all this time, for most have been lost. Apart from family portraits attributed to him, two others on religious subjects are reported. One was a "Last Supper" at Newtown Church, the other a head of Christ owned by another family member. In 1741 Dyer travelled to Worcester to paint the portrait of Bishop John Hough and while there was persuaded to seek ordination in the Church of England. In September of that year he was created a deacon and by October was made priest of Catthorpe in Leicestershire, a position he held for the next nine years.

Now Dyer married a 26-year-old widow, Sarah Ensor Hawkins (said to be a descendant of Shakespeare), with whom he had several children. In 1751 patrons found him a more prosperous living in Belchford, Lincolnshire, and in the following year he ministered to Coningsby as well, later still moving to Kirkby on Bain, also in Lincolnshire. In 1752 he had been made a Bachelor of Laws of Cambridge and by now had begun writing The Fleece, on the title page of which the initials LL.B followed his name.

Living in the Lincolnshire fens, "among reeds and mud, begirt with dead brown lakes", as he reported in verses sent to a friend, proved fatal to Dyer's tubercular condition. Some months after the publication of his final poem, he died in December 1757. His major poems were published by Robert Dodsley in 1761, followed later by wider selections that included his earlier poems from Savage's miscellany. The contents of these varied little, until the appearance of The Poems of Mark Akenside and John Dyer, This included manuscript poems in the possession of a family descendant, William Hilton Longstaffe, who had earlier written a commentary on some of these in The Patrician. Edward Thomas brought out a shorter selection in 1903 for the Welsh Library and there have been American studies of his poetry since then.

== Poems ==
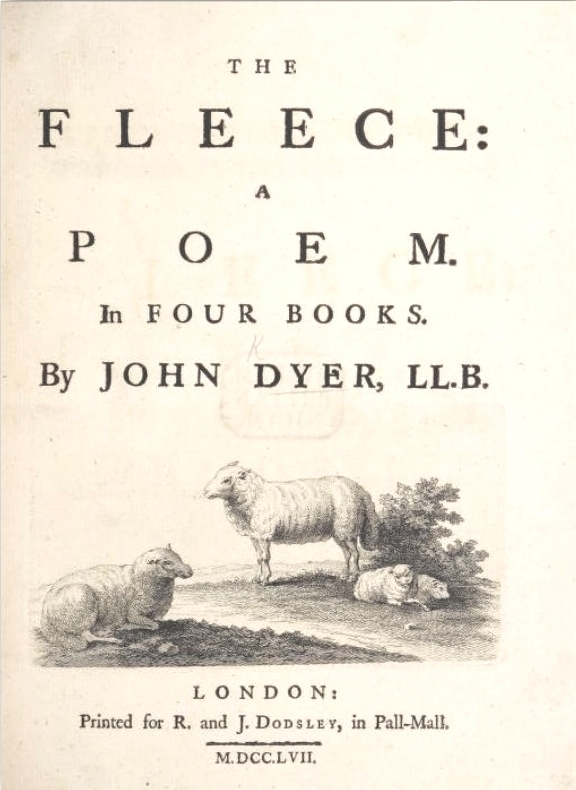
Title page of The Fleece

Among Dyer's papers is a transcription that he describes as "P't of Gron'. Hill as 'twas wrote first in ye year 1716". It is a discursive work in decasyllabic couplets with little relation to the Grongar Hill published a decade later and might just as well have served as the basis of "The Country Walk". The first published version of his celebration of the hill was written in Pindarics and originally appeared in Richard Savage's miscellany. In the same year, after having received some acclaim, Dyer rewrote Grongar Hill in four-stressed octosyllabic couplets roughly modelled on those of Milton's L'Allegro and contrasting strongly with the version of pastoral in Alexander Pope's Windsor Forest. Though the rhymes and grammar are uncertain, the poem was eventually to be accounted his best work and was recognised as a precursor of Romanticism. Dyer worked outside the trend of politically oriented work and kept his focus on the rural landscape, its colours and visual perspective, following his training as a painter.

The Ruins of Rome was a descriptive poem in 545 lines of Miltonic blank-verse. Though it was first published anonymously in 1740, its reference to the earlier "Grongar" in its opening lines establishes Dyer's authorship.

Enough of Grongar, and the shady dales
Of winding Towy, Merlin's fabled haunt,
I sung inglorious. Now the love of arts,
And what in metal or in stone remains
Of proud Antiquity, thro' various realms
And various languages and ages fam'd,
Bears me remote o'er Gallia's woody bounds.

As in that earlier poem, Dyer's approach to antiquity is personalised and a forerunner of the "Age of Sensibility" that led poetry in the direction of Romanticism. The poem has been described as "largely responsible for the eighteenth-century revival of a unique subgenre of landscape poetry dealing with the ruins of the ancient world."

The ambitious four-book The Fleece (1757) was also written in blank-verse. It was a georgic in the line of Virgilian imitations written during the 18th century that included John Philips' Cyder, Christopher Smart's The Hop-Garden (1752) and James Grainger's The Sugar Cane (1764). Dyer's poem deals with the tending of sheep, the shearing and preparation of the wool, weaving, and trade in woollen manufactures. Its lofty epic diction also addresses the reasons for England's prosperity and on a personal level reflects on the benefits that trade will bring to him. Poetic recognition, however, was not among such benefits at the time, although the work had its supporters, including Grainger, one of the few who reviewed Dyer's poem sympathetically. In the following century William Wordsworth was to address a sonnet to Dyer as the

Bard of the Fleece, whose skilful genius made
That work a living landscape fair and bright.

== Bibliography ==
- Cazamian, Louis. A History of English Literature Modern Times (1660–1950). New York: Macmillan Co., 1957. 824. Print.
- Goodridge, John. Rural Life in Eighteenth-Century English Poetry. Cambridge: Cambridge University Press, 2005. Print.
- Head, Dominic, ed. "Dyer, John." The Cambridge Guide to Literature in English. 3rd ed. New York: Cambridge UP, 2006. 336. Print.
- Humfrey, Belinda. John Dyer. Cardiff: University of Wales Press, 1980. Print.
- Longstaffe, William Hilton. "Notes on the life and writings of John Dyer, the poet", The Patrician vol.IV (1847)
- Saintsbury, George. "Dyer." Short History of English Literature. London: Macmillan & Co. Ltd., 1960. 572. Print.
- Sampson, George. "The Age of Johnson." The Concise Cambridge History of English Literature. New York: The Macmillan Company, 1941. 523. Print.
- Williams, Ralph M. Poet, Painter and Parson: the Life of John Dyer. New York: 1956. Print.
- Wilmott, Robert Aris (ed.). The Poetical Works of Mark Akenside and John Dyer, London 1885
