= Henry Gastineau =

English painter

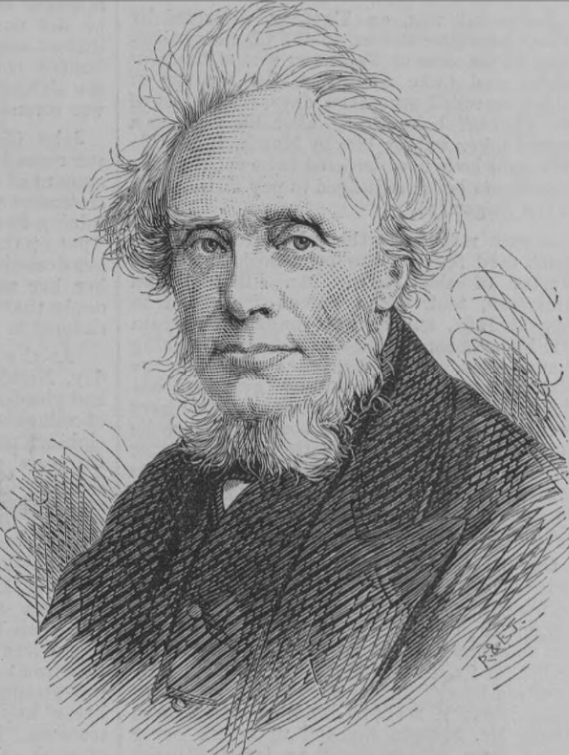
Henry Gastineau from 5 Feb 1876 in the Illustrated London News

Henry Gastineau (1791–1876) was an English engraver and prolific painter in water-colours. He was born in London to a family of Huguenot descent. One of his daughters, Maria Gastineau, painted in a similar style.

== Life ==
He was a student at the Royal Academy, and began as an engraver, but switched to painting in oils. He eventually settled down exclusively to working in water-colour. He first exhibited at the Royal Academy in 1812. A favourite subject was coastal scenery.

Gastineau joined the Society of Painters in Water-colours in 1818, when he exhibited for the first time. In 1821 he was elected an associate, and in 1823 a full member. He exhibited for 58 years without a break, showing eleven pictures when eighty-five years of age.

A contemporary of David Cox, Copley Fielding, George Cattermole, and Samuel Prout, he kept to the old manner of water-colour painting. Gastineau also devoted a great deal of his time to teaching, both privately and at various schools. Early in life he built for himself a house, Norfolk Lodge, in Cold Harbour Lane, Camberwell, and lived there until his death on 17 January 1876 in his eighty-sixth year. He was then the oldest living member of the Old Society of Painters in Water-colours. He left a family, one of whom, Maria Gastineau, was born in 1827 and she was also a water-colour painter.

Like Cox, Cattermole and Prout, he was buried at West Norwood Cemetery.

Gastineau's unsold works were auctioned at Christie's on 19 May 1876.

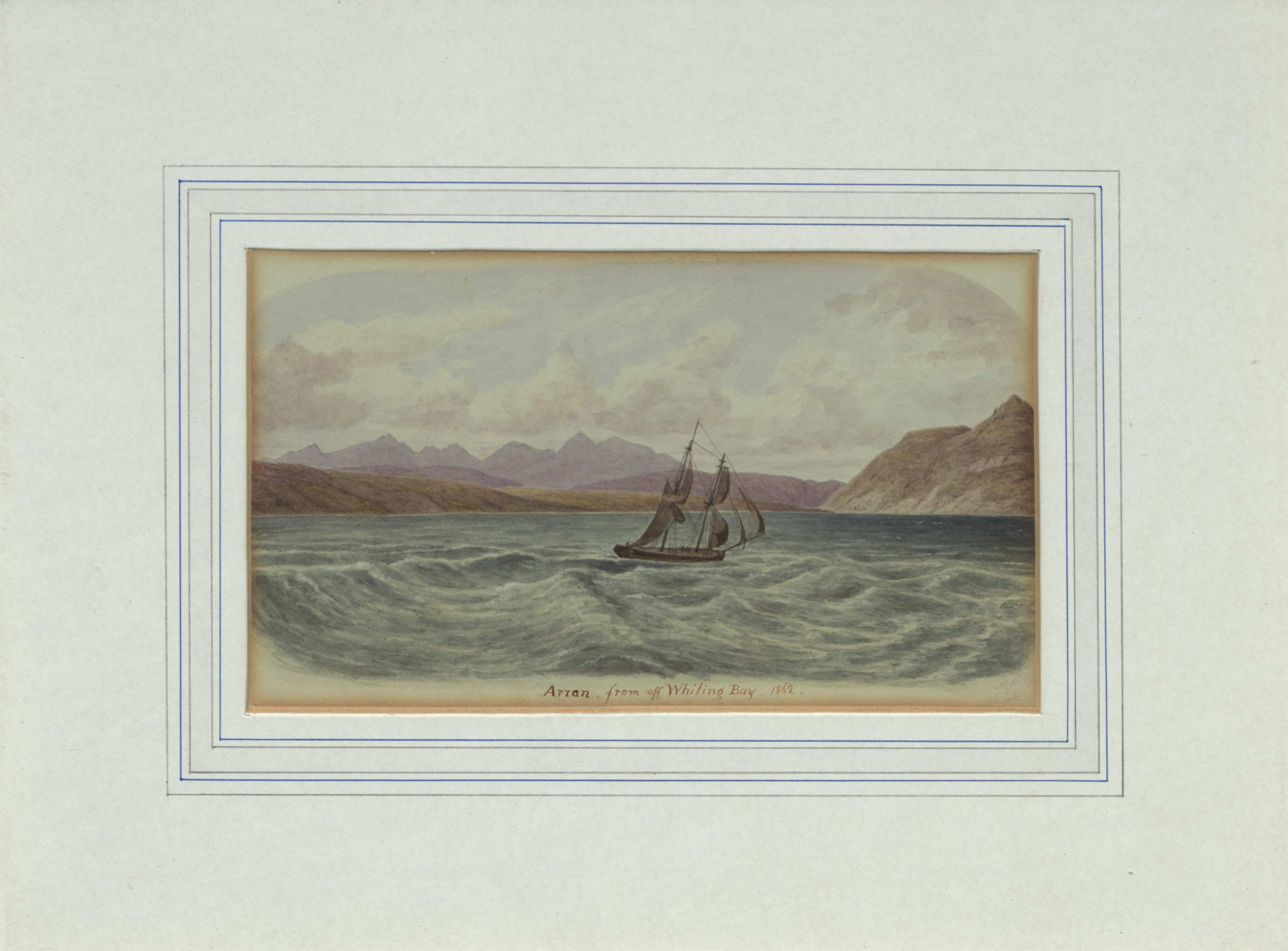
Arran from off Whiting Bay, Aberdeen Archives, Gallery & Museums Collection

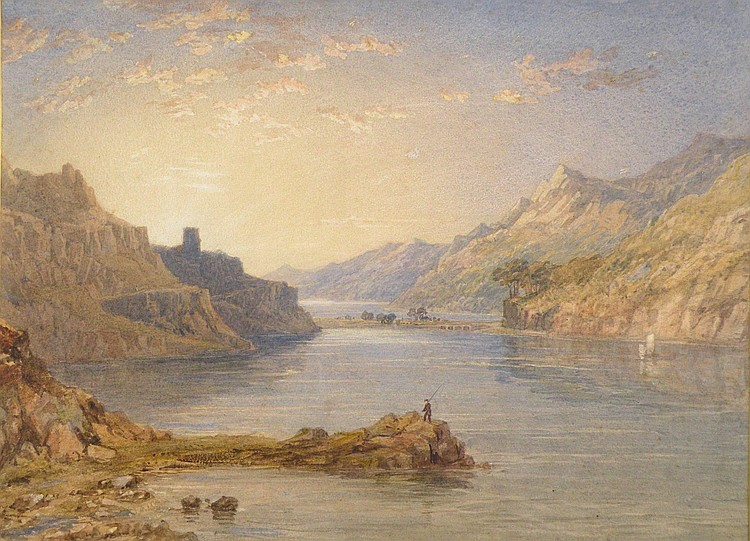
Maria G Gastineau's 1855 painting of Llyn Padarn

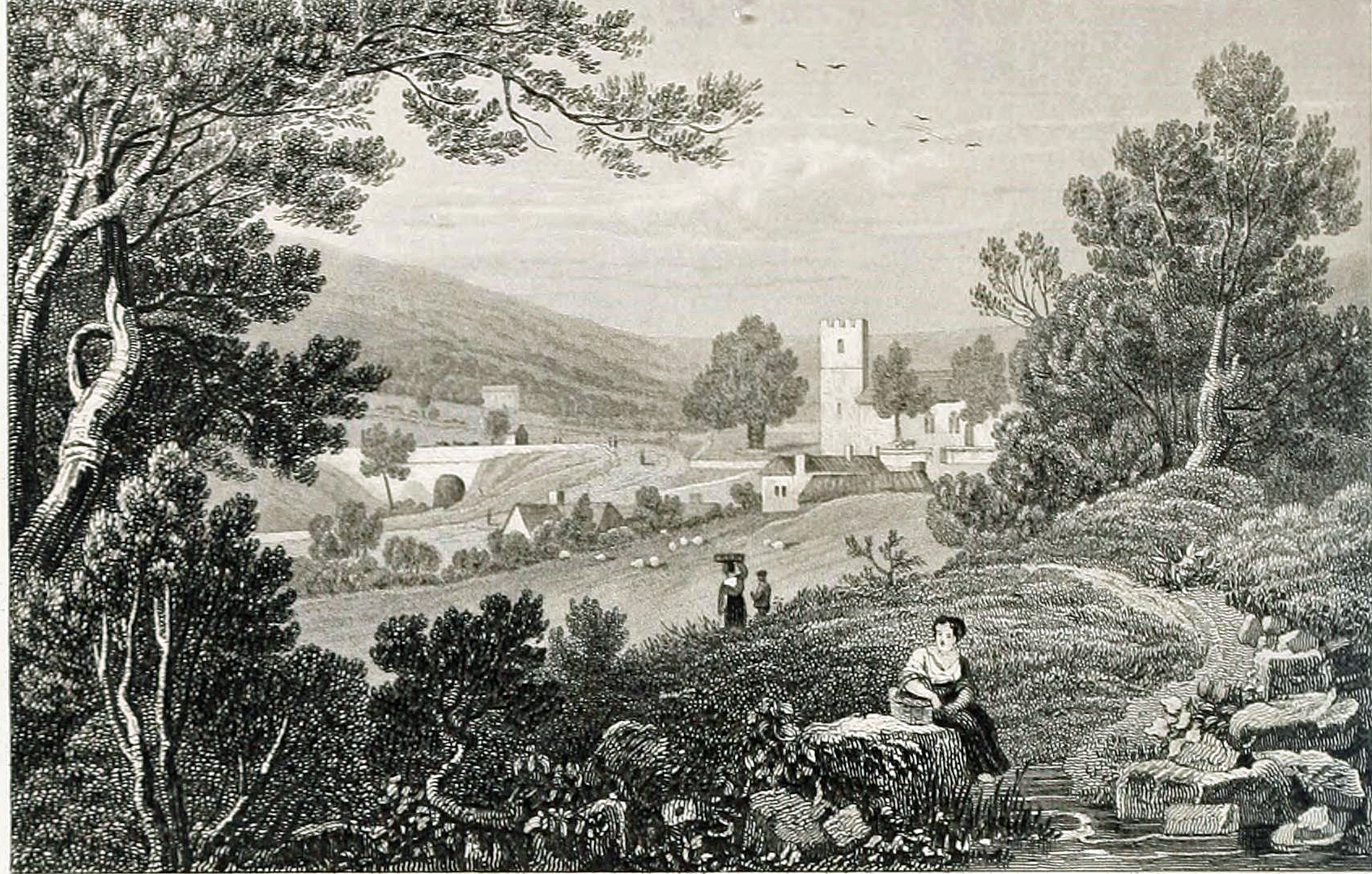
St Peter's, Blaina, Monmouthshire in 1820. Steel engraving from a drawing by Henry Gastineau.
