= Keith A. Sandiford =

Barbadian-born historian

Keith Albert Sandiford (born 1947) is a Barbadian-born historian. He has taught literature at Louisiana State University since 1986.

== Life and career ==
Sandiford was born in Barbados and educated at Combermere School in Bridgetown. He received a BA from the Interamerican University of Puerto Rico, and an MA and a PhD from the University of Illinois at Urbana–Champaign. His PhD dissertation was titled "The Evolution of Racial and Political Consciousness in Three Black Writers of Eighteenth-Century England."

After graduating, Sandiford taught at Combermere School, at the University of the West Indies in Cave Hill, Barbados, and at Coppin State University in Baltimore. Since 1986 he has taught 18th-century British Literature and Afro-American Literature at Louisiana State University. His research and publication interests have focused primarily on literature and 18th-century Caribbean society, especially in regards to the sugar industry and slavery.

== Books ==
- Measuring the Moment: Strategies of Protest in Eighteenth-Century Afro-English Writing (1988)
- The Cultural Politics of Sugar: Caribbean Slavery and Narratives of Colonialism (2000)
- Theorizing a Colonial Caribbean-Atlantic Imaginary: Sugar and Obeah (2011)
