= 1935 Llandeilo Rural District Council election =

1935 Welsh local government election

An election to the Llandeilo Rural District Council in Wales was held on 1 April 1935. The election was held following the merger of the Llandeilo and Llandovery rural districts and the need to reduce the total number of members on the new authority. Following a recommendation made in 1932, it was decided that the rural districts of Llandeilo and Llandovery would be merged. Elections were held in wards that had been amalgamated and also in wards where the number of councillors had been reduced.

It was preceded by the 1934 election and followed by the 1937 election which would be the first time that a whole council would be elected for the merged authority.

== Boundary changes ==
A number of boundary changes resulted from the amalgamation of Llandovery RDC into Llandeilo RDC. These included the amalgamation of some parishes in the Llandelio RDC area and the reduction in the number of councillors in certain wards.

In addition the whole of the Llandovery RDC area was amalgamated with Llandeilo RDC.

== Candidates ==
Most of the candidates who contested the election were sitting members. There were unopposed returns in five wards initially, Also, there were unopposed returns in Llanfynydd and Llangathen following withdrawals.

== Outcome ==
There was no change to the political composition of the authority as a result of the election.

== Ward results ==
=== Betws (two seats) ===
Betws 1935
Party	Candidate	Votes	%	±%
Labour	David Bowen	183		
Independent	David Emrys Harries*	156		
Independent	David Daniel Thomas*	150		
Independent Labour	D. Glyn Jenkins*	145		
Labour win (new seat)				
Independent win (new seat)				

=== Brechfa (one seat) ===
Brechfa 1935
Party	Candidate	Votes	%	±%
Independent	William Thomas	Unopposed		
Independent win (new seat)				

=== Cilycwm (one seat) ===
Cilycwm 1935
Party	Candidate	Votes	%	±%
Independent	Ivor Elystan Campbell-Davys	Unopposed		
Independent win (new seat)				

=== Conwil Caio (two seats) ===
Conwil Caio 1935
Party	Candidate	Votes	%	±%
Independent	Thomas Davies*	Unopposed		
Independent	Jane Williams*	Unopposed		
Independent win (new seat)				

=== Llanddeusant (one seat) ===
Llanddeusant 1935
Party	Candidate	Votes	%	±%
Independent	David Evans*	Unopposed		
Independent win (new seat)				

=== Llandebie (two seats) ===
Llandebie 1934
Party	Candidate	Votes	%	±%
Labour	Alfred Bowen Thomas	612		
Labour	William Morris*	509		
Independent	David Harries	494		
Independent	Frederick Davies*	395		
Labour win (new seat)				
Labour win (new seat)				

=== Llandeilo Fawr North Ward (two seats) ===
Llandeilo Fawr North Ward 1935
Party	Candidate	Votes	%	±%
Independent	James Thomas*	Unopposed		
Independent	William Williams*	Unopposed		
Independent win (new seat)				
Independent win (new seat)				

=== Llanegwad (two seats) ===
Llanegwad 1935
Party	Candidate	Votes	%	±%
Independent	Ben Davies*	Unopposed		
Independent	Dan Davies*	Unopposed		
Independent win (new seat)				
Independent win (new seat)				

=== Llanfair-ar-y-Bryn (one seat) ===
Llanfair-ar-y-Bryn 1935
Party	Candidate	Votes	%	±%
Independent	Daniel James Lewis*	Unopposed		
Independent hold		Swing		

=== Llanfihangel Aberbythych South Ward (one seat) ===
Llanfihangel Aberbythych South Ward 1935
Party	Candidate	Votes	%	±%
Independent	David Jones*	225		
Independent	Henry Jones*	202		
Independent win (new seat)				

=== Llanfynydd (one seat) ===
Llanfynydd 1935
Party	Candidate	Votes	%	±%
Independent	Rev Rhys Curzon Jones*	Unopposed		
Independent win (new seat)				

=== Llangadock (two seats) ===
Llangadock 1935
Party	Candidate	Votes	%	±%
Independent	William T. Morgan*	450		
Independent	Joseph Ll. Evans*	376		
Independent	Oliver J.N. Jones	167		
Independent	Victor Hugo Williams	77		
Independent	Henry William Seale*	67		
Independent win (new seat)				
Independent win (new seat)				

=== Llangathen (one seat) ===
Llangathen 1935
Party	Candidate	Votes	%	±%
Independent	Nurse Esther Anne Olley*	Unopposed		
Independent win (new seat)				

=== Llansadwrn (one seat) ===
Llansadwrn 1935
Party	Candidate	Votes	%	±%
Independent	Mrs R.M. Rees	160		
Independent	William John Davies	147		
Independent win (new seat)				

=== Llansawel (one seat) ===
Llansawel 1935
Party	Candidate	Votes	%	±%
Independent	John James Thomas*	140		
Independent	William Davies	113		
Independent win (new seat)				

=== Myddfai (one seat) ===
Myddfai 1935
Party	Candidate	Votes	%	±%
Independent	David Davies*	Unopposed		
Independent win (new seat)				

=== Talley (one seat) ===
Talley 1935
Party	Candidate	Votes	%	±%
Independent	Daniel Williams	Unopposed		
Independent	John Morgans	Unopposed		
Independent win (new seat)				
