= 1913 Llandeilo Rural District Council election =

Welsh local election

An election to the Llandeilo Rural District Council was held in April 1913. It was preceded by the 1910 election and, due to the scheduled 1916 election being postponed due to the First World War, was followed by the 1919 election. The majority of members were returned unopposed. The successful candidates were also elected to the Llandeilo Board of Guardians.

== Ward results ==
=== Bettws (three seats) ===
Bettws 1913
Party	Candidate	Votes	%	±%
Independent	Rev J. Edryd Jones	Unopposed		
Independent	David Morris*	Unopposed		
Independent	John Lewis Williams	Unopposed		
Independent hold		Swing		
Independent hold		Swing		
Independent hold		Swing		

=== Brechfa (one seat) ===
Brechfa 1913
Party	Candidate	Votes	%	±%
Independent	W. Thomas	Unopposed		
Independent hold		Swing		

=== Glynamman (one seat) ===
Glynamman 1913
Party	Candidate	Votes	%	±%
Independent	David William Lewis*	Unopposed		
Independent hold		Swing		

=== Llandebie (three seats) ===
An additional seat had been allocated to this ward.

Llandebie 1913
Party	Candidate	Votes	%	±%
Independent	Robert Matthews*	230		
Independent	Jacob Davies*	278		
Independent	J. Thomas	233		
Independent	Frederick Davies	175		
Independent	Captain Bright	105		
Independent hold		Swing		
Independent hold		Swing		

=== Blaenau (Llandebie) (two seats) ===
Blaenau (Llandebie) 1913
Party	Candidate	Votes	%	±%
Independent	William Williams*	362		
Independent	David Davies*	349		
Labour	John Bevan	227		
Independent hold		Swing		
Independent hold		Swing		

=== Llandeilo Fawr North Ward (three seats) ===
Llandeilo Fawr North Ward 1913
Party	Candidate	Votes	%	±%
Independent	Evan Davies*	254		
Independent	Rev Thompson Jenkins	228		
Independent	John Richards	228		
Independent	David Davies	205		
Independent hold		Swing		
Independent hold		Swing		

=== Llandeilo Fawr South Ward (two seats) ===
Llandeilo Fawr South Ward 1913
Party	Candidate	Votes	%	±%
Independent	L.N. Powell*	Unopposed		
Independent	Caleb Thomas	Unopposed		
Independent hold		Swing		
Independent hold		Swing		

=== Llandyfeisant (one seat) ===
Llandyfeisant 1913
Party	Candidate	Votes	%	±%
Independent	Lord Dynevor*	Unopposed		
Independent hold				

=== Llanegwad (three seats) ===
Llanegwad 1913
Party	Candidate	Votes	%	±%
Independent	Dan Davies*	Unopposed		
Independent	William Edwin Richards*	Unopposed		
Independent	Richard Thomas*	Unopposed		
Independent hold		Swing		
Independent hold		Swing		
Independent hold		Swing		

=== Llanfihangel Aberbythych (two seats) ===
Llanfihangel Aberbythych 1913
Party	Candidate	Votes	%	±%
Independent	James T. Stephens	Unopposed		
Independent	William Stephens	Unopposed		
Independent hold		Swing		
Independent hold		Swing		

=== Llanfihangel Cilfragen (one seat) ===
Llanfihangel Cilfragen 1913
Party	Candidate	Votes	%	±%
Independent	Thomas Evans*	Unopposed		
Independent hold		Swing		

=== Llanfynydd (two seats) ===
Llanfynydd 1913
Party	Candidate	Votes	%	±%
Independent	William Roberts*	Unopposed		
Independent	David Thomas*	Unopposed		
Independent hold		Swing		
Independent hold		Swing		

=== Llangathen (two seats) ===
Llangathen 1913
Party	Candidate	Votes	%	±%
Independent	William Griffiths*	Unopposed		
Independent	William Lewis*	Unopposed		
Independent hold		Swing		
Independent hold		Swing		

=== Llansawel (two seats) ===
Llansawel 1913
Party	Candidate	Votes	%	±%
Independent	Lewis Bowen*	Unopposed		
Independent	Thomas Humphreys	Unopposed		
Independent hold		Swing		
Independent hold		Swing		

=== Quarter Bach No.1 (one seat) ===
Quarter Bach 1913
Party	Candidate	Votes	%	±%
Independent	Gomer Harries	Unopposed		
Independent hold		Swing		

=== Quarter Bach No.2 (one seat) ===
Quarter Bach 1913
Party	Candidate	Votes	%	±%
Independent	Rees Powell*	Unopposed		
Independent hold		Swing		

=== Talley (two seats) ===
Talley 1910
Party	Candidate	Votes	%	±%
Independent	Rev J. Alban Davies*	90		
Independent	Evan Harries	83		
Independent	David Thomas	63		
Independent hold		Swing		
Independent hold		Swing		

== Llandeilo Board of Guardians ==
All members of the District Council also served as members of Llandeilo Board of Guardians. A further three Guardians were elected to represent the Llandeilo Urban District.

Three Guardians were elected to represent the Ammanford Urban District which also lay within the remit of the Llandeilo Guardians. All three sitting members were returned unopposed.

In addition, following the formation of the new Cwmamman Urban District in 1912, a further three members were elected to represent that area.

=== Ammanford (three seats) ===
Ammanford 1913
Party	Candidate	Votes	%	±%
Independent	John Lewis*	Unopposed		
Independent	Rev John Morgans*	Unopposed		
Independent	Henry Herbert*	Unopposed		
Independent hold		Swing		
Independent hold		Swing		
Independent hold		Swing		

=== Cwmamman (three seats) ===
Cwmamman 1913
Party	Candidate	Votes	%	±%
Labour	William Roberts	615		
Liberal	Dan Jones	531		
Liberal	Arthur Williams	503		
Liberal	William Jenkins	418		
Labour win (new seat)				
Liberal win (new seat)				
Liberal win (new seat)				

=== Llandeilo (three seats) ===
Llandeilo 1913
Party	Candidate	Votes	%	±%
Independent	Pritchard Davies*	Unopposed		
Independent	William Hopkins*	Unopposed		
Independent	Mrs E.A. Roberts*	Unopposed		
Independent hold		Swing		
Independent hold		Swing		
Independent hold		Swing		
