= 1925 Llandeilo Rural District Council election =

Local council election in Wales

An election to the Llandeilo Rural District Council was held in April 1925. It was preceded by the 1922 election and followed by the 1928 election. The successful candidates were also elected to the Llandeilo Board of Guardians.

== Overview of the result ==
As in the past many candidates stood without party affiliations although an increased number of Labour candidates contested the industrial wards but the party lost ground following the party's defeat at a national level at the 1924 General Election. As in previous elections a number of the members representing rural wards were returned unopposed.

== Ward results ==
=== Betws (three seats) ===
Betws 1925
Party	Candidate	Votes	%	±%
Labour	D. Glyn Jenkins*	128		
Independent	John Davies*	113		
Labour	Henry Davies*	108		
Labour	D. Bowen	92		
Labour hold		Swing		
Independent hold		Swing		
Labour hold		Swing		

=== Blaenau (three seats) ===
Blaenau 1922
Party	Candidate	Votes	%	±%
Independent	William Williams*	917		
Labour	John Bevan*	806		
Independent	David Davies*	745		
Labour	William Howells	440		
Labour	Enoch Hendy	196		
Majority				
Independent hold		Swing		
Labour hold		Swing		
Independent hold		Swing		

=== Brechfa (one seat) ===
Brechfa 1919
Party	Candidate	Votes	%	±%
Independent	Joseph Sivell	Unopposed		
Independent hold		Swing		

=== Glynamman (one seat) ===
Glynamman 1919
Party	Candidate	Votes	%	±%
Independent	William Walters	Unopposed		
Independent hold		Swing		

=== Llandebie (three seats) ===
Llandebie 1925
Party	Candidate	Votes	%	±%
Independent	Frederick Davies*	428		
Independent	John Lewis*	417		
Independent	David Lewis Thomas*	353		
Independent	David Harries	272		
Labour	Daniel Jenkins	259		
Independent	J. Johns	192		
Labour	Elizabeth Davies	181		
Labour	Tom Hind	177		
Independent hold		Swing		
Independent hold		Swing		
Independent hold		Swing		

=== Llandeilo Fawr North Ward (three seats) ===
Llandeilo Fawr North Ward 1919
Party	Candidate	Votes	%	±%
Independent	Evan Davies*	Unopposed		
Independent	Roderick Evans	Unopposed		
Independent	John Richards*	Unopposed		
Independent hold		Swing		
Independent hold		Swing		

=== Llandeilo Fawr South Ward (two seats) ===
Llandeilo Fawr South Ward 1919
Party	Candidate	Votes	%	±%
Independent	L.N. Powell*	238		
Independent	Thomas Morris*	228		
Independent	Mrs Phillips	195		
Independent	Thomas James	54		
Independent hold		Swing		
Independent hold		Swing		

=== Llandyfeisant (one seat) ===
Llandyfeisant 1919
Party	Candidate	Votes	%	±%
Independent	Lord Dynevor*	Unopposed		
Independent hold		Swing		

=== Llanegwad (three seats) ===
Llanegwad 1919
Party	Candidate	Votes	%	±%
Independent	Dan Davies*	Unopposed		
Independent	William Edwin Richards*	Unopposed		
Independent	Richard Thomas*	Unopposed		
Independent hold		Swing		
Independent hold		Swing		
Independent hold		Swing		

=== Llanfihangel Aberbythych (two seats) ===
Llanfihangel Aberbythych 1919
Party	Candidate	Votes	%	±%
Independent	Tom Rees*	203		
Independent	William Stephens*	140		
Independent	William John Evans	135		
Labour	Henry Jones	134		
Labour	James Thomas Stephens	60		
Independent hold		Swing		
Independent hold		Swing		

=== Llanfihangel Cilfragen (one seat) ===
Llanfihangel Cilfragen 1919
Party	Candidate	Votes	%	±%
Independent	Thomas Evans*	Unopposed		
Independent hold		Swing		

=== Llanfynydd (two seats) ===
Llanfynydd 1919
Party	Candidate	Votes	%	±%
Independent	Daniel Lloyd	Unopposed		
Independent	David Thomas*	Unopposed		
Independent hold		Swing		
Independent hold		Swing		

=== Llangathen (two seats) ===
Llangathen 1919
Party	Candidate	Votes	%	±%
Independent	David Williams	166		
Independent	William Lewis*	129		
Independent	William Rees	74		
Independent	D.W. Morgans	41		
Independent hold		Swing		
Independent hold		Swing		

=== Llansawel (two seats) ===
This was the only contest in a rural ward at the election.

Llansawel 1919
Party	Candidate	Votes	%	±%
Independent	J. Thomas	119		
Independent	Thomas Humphreys*	195		
Independent	John Morgan	85		
Independent	J. Jones	37		
Independent hold		Swing		
Independent hold		Swing		

=== Quarter Bach No.1 (one seat) ===
Quarter Bach 1919
Party	Candidate	Votes	%	±%
Labour	Enoch Isaac	Unopposed		
Labour hold		Swing		

=== Quarter Bach No.2 (one seat) ===
Quarter Bach No.2 1919
Party	Candidate	Votes	%	±%
Labour	John Hughes	Unopposed		
Labour hold		Swing		

=== Talley (two seats) ===
Talley 1919
Party	Candidate	Votes	%	±%
Independent	John Thomas Morgan	Unopposed		
Independent	David Edwin Thomas	Unopposed		
Independent hold		Swing		
Independent hold		Swing		

== Llandeilo Board of Guardians ==
All members of the District Council also served as members of Llandeilo Board of Guardians. In addition, three Guardians were elected to represent the Ammanford Urban District and another three to represent the Cwmamman Urban District, both of which also lay within the remit of the Llandeilo Guardians. A further three Guardians were elected to represent the Llandeilo Urban District.

Elected candidates at both Ammanford and Cwmamman stood specifically as Liberals, in contrast to the non-political nature of previous Guardians elections.

=== Ammanford (three seats) ===
The three sitting members, including Henry Herbert, a Guardian for nearly forty years, were re-elected.

Ammanford 1919
Party	Candidate	Votes	%	±%
Liberal	John Lewis*	1,325		
Liberal	Rev John Morgans*	1,144		
Liberal	Henry Herbert*	871		
Labour	William Cathan Davies	602		
Labour	D. Rufus Evans	424		
Labour	Arthur Edgar Thomas	417		
Liberal hold		Swing		
Liberal hold		Swing		
Liberal hold		Swing		

=== Cwmamman (three seats) ===
Cwmamman 1919
Party	Candidate	Votes	%	±%
Labour	William Roberts*	919		
Liberal	Arthur Williams*	786		
Labour	Thomas Henry Jones	623		
Independent	David Thomas David	514		
Labour	James Thomas	487		
Labour hold		Swing		
Liberal hold		Swing		
Labour hold		Swing		

=== Llandeilo (three seats) ===
Llandeilo 1919
Party	Candidate	Votes	%	±%
Independent	David Pritchard Davies*	416		
Independent	William Hopkins*	389		
Independent	Edith Jane Roberts*	377		
Independent	Alfred Fox	333		
Independent hold		Swing		
Independent hold		Swing		
Independent hold		Swing		
