= 1907 Llandeilo Rural District Council election =

Welsh local election

The fifth election to the Llandeilo Rural District Council was held in March 1907. It was preceded by the 1904 election and followed by the 1910 election. The successful candidates were also elected to the Llandeilo Board of Guardians.

There were a number of unopposed returns, especially in the rural parishes.

== Ward results ==
=== Bettws (three seats) ===
Bettws 1907
Party	Candidate	Votes	%	±%
Independent	David Thomas Jones*	Unopposed		
Independent	David Morris*	Unopposed		
Independent	Thomas Thomas*	Unopposed		
Independent hold		Swing		
Independent hold		Swing		
Independent hold		Swing		

=== Brechfa (one seat) ===
Brechfa 1904
Party	Candidate	Votes	%	±%
Independent	Joseph Sivell	Unopposed		
Independent hold		Swing		

=== Glynamman (one seat) ===
Glynamman 1907
Party	Candidate	Votes	%	±%
Independent	David William Lewis*	Unopposed		
Independent hold		Swing		

=== Llandebie (two seats) ===
Llandebie 1907
Party	Candidate	Votes	%	±%
Independent	John Jones*	137		
Independent	Jacob Davies*	131		
Independent	William Davies	123		
Independent	Moses Williams	70		
Independent	John Hopkins	45		
Independent hold		Swing		
Independent hold		Swing		

=== Llandebie, Blaenau (two seats) ===
Llandebie, Blaenau 1907
Party	Candidate	Votes	%	±%
Independent	David Davies*	Unopposed		
Independent	William Williams*	Unopposed		
Independent hold		Swing		
Independent hold		Swing		

=== Llandeilo Fawr North Ward (three seats) ===
Llandeilo Fawr North Ward 1907
Party	Candidate	Votes	%	±%
Independent	William Harries	235		
Independent	Evan Davies	233		
Independent	William Griffiths*	233		
Independent	John Perkins*	214		
Independent hold		Swing		
Independent hold		Swing		
Independent hold		Swing		

=== Llandeilo Fawr South Ward (two seats) ===
Llandeilo Fawr South Ward 1907
Party	Candidate	Votes	%	±%
Independent	Mary Anne Jones*	Unopposed		
Independent	Lewis Nathaniel Powell*	Unopposed		
Independent hold		Swing		
Independent hold		Swing		

=== Llandyfeisant (one seat) ===
Llandyfeisant 1907
Party	Candidate	Votes	%	±%
Independent	Walter FitzUryan Rice*	Unopposed		
Independent hold				

=== Llanegwad (three seats) ===
Llanegwad 1907
Party	Candidate	Votes	%	±%
Independent	Dan Davies*	Unopposed		
Independent	John George Davies*	Unopposed		
Independent	Richard Thomas*	Unopposed		
Independent hold		Swing		
Independent hold		Swing		
Independent hold		Swing		

=== Llanfihangel Aberbythych (two seats) ===
Llanfihangel Aberbythych 1904
Party	Candidate	Votes	%	±%
Independent	David Burnett*	Unopposed		
Independent	Roderick James*	Unopposed		
Independent hold		Swing		
Independent hold		Swing		

=== Llanfihangel Cilfragen (one seat) ===
Llanfihangel Cilfragen 1907
Party	Candidate	Votes	%	±%
Independent	Thomas Evans*	Unopposed		
Independent hold		Swing		

=== Llanfynydd (two seats) ===
Llanfynydd 1907
Party	Candidate	Votes	%	±%
Independent	David Gwynne*	Unopposed		
Independent	Cecil John Herbert Spence Jones	Unopposed		
Independent hold		Swing		
Independent hold		Swing		

=== Llangathen (two seats) ===
Llangathen 1904
Party	Candidate	Votes	%	±%
Independent	Ebenezer Griffiths*	Unopposed		
Independent	W.R. Thomas*	Unopposed		
Independent hold		Swing		
Independent hold		Swing		

=== Llansawel (two seats) ===
Llansawel 1907
Party	Candidate	Votes	%	±%
Independent	Lewis Davies Bowen*	Unopposed		
Independent	Thomas Davies*	Unopposed		
Independent hold		Swing		
Independent hold		Swing		

=== Quarter Bach No.1 (one seat) ===
Quarter Bach No.1 1907
Party	Candidate	Votes	%	±%
Independent	John Llewellyn*	Unopposed		
Independent hold		Swing		

=== Quarter Bach No.2 (one seat) ===
Quarter Bach No.2 1907
Party	Candidate	Votes	%	±%
Independent	Rees Powell*	Unopposed		
Independent hold		Swing		

=== Talley (two seats) ===
Talley 1907
Party	Candidate	Votes	%	±%
Independent	Rev J. Alban Davies	66		
Independent	J. B. Griffiths	51		
Independent	John Williams*	47		
Independent	J. Thomas	43		
Independent hold		Swing		
Independent hold		Swing		

== Llandeilo Board of Guardians ==
All members of the District Council also served as members of Llandeilo Board of Guardians. In addition, three Guardians were elected to represent the Ammanford Urban District which was established in 1903. A further three Guardians were elected to represent the Llandeilo Urban District.

=== Ammanford (three seats) ===
The three sitting members, including Henry Herbert, a Guardian for nearly twenty years, were re-elected.

Ammanford 1910
Party	Candidate	Votes	%	±%
Liberal	John Lewis*	1,325		
Liberal	Rev John Morgans*	1,144		
Liberal	Henry Herbert*	871		
Liberal hold		Swing		
Liberal hold		Swing		
Liberal hold		Swing		

=== Llandeilo (three seats) ===
Llandeilo 1907
Party	Candidate	Votes	%	±%
Independent	Mrs E.A. Roberts	313		
Independent	William Hopkins	289		
Independent	Pritchard Davies	277		
Independent	D. Evans	206		
Independent hold		Swing		
Independent hold		Swing		
Independent hold		Swing		
