= 1910 Llandeilo Rural District Council election =

Welsh local election

An election to the Llandeilo Rural District Council was held in April 1910. It was preceded by the 1907 election and followed by the 1913 election. Around half the members were elected unopposed. The successful candidates were also elected to the Llandeilo Board of Guardians.

== Ward results ==
=== Bettws (three seats) ===
Bettws 1910
Party	Candidate	Votes	%	±%
Independent	David Morris*	428		
Independent	Morgan Rees	365		
Independent	John Phillips	341		
Independent	Thomas Thomas*	263		
Independent	Morgan Morgan*	259		
Independent hold		Swing		
Independent hold		Swing		

=== Brechfa (one seat) ===
Brechfa 1910
Party	Candidate	Votes	%	±%
Independent	W. Thomas	Unopposed		
Independent hold		Swing		

=== Glynamman (one seat) ===
Glynamman 1910
Party	Candidate	Votes	%	±%
Independent	David William Lewis*	Unopposed		
Independent hold		Swing		

=== Llandebie (two seats) ===
Llandebie 1910
Party	Candidate	Votes	%	±%
Independent	Robert Matthews	228		
Independent	Jacob Davies*	190		
Independent	Arthur Williams	174		
Independent hold		Swing		
Independent hold		Swing		

=== Blaenau (Llandebie) (two seats) ===
Blaenau (Llandebie) 1910
Party	Candidate	Votes	%	±%
Independent	William Willimas*	362		
Independent	David Davies*	349		
Labour	John Bevan	227		
Independent hold		Swing		
Independent hold		Swing		

=== Llandeilo Fawr North Ward (three seats) ===
Llandeilo Fawr North Ward 1910
Party	Candidate	Votes	%	±%
Independent	Evan Davies*	244		
Independent	Dvid Watkins	216		
Independent	Tom Rees Morgan	199		
Independent	Rees Perkins	189		
Independent	William Griffiths	157		
Independent hold		Swing		
Independent hold		Swing		

=== Llandeilo Fawr South Ward (two seats) ===
Llandeilo Fawr South Ward 1910
Party	Candidate	Votes	%	±%
Independent	Mary Anne Jones	Unopposed		
Independent	L.N. Powell	Unopposed		
Independent hold		Swing		
Independent hold		Swing		

=== Llandyfeisant (one seat) ===
Llandyfeisant 1910
Party	Candidate	Votes	%	±%
Independent	Walter FitzUryan Rice*	Unopposed		
Independent hold				

=== Llanegwad (three seats) ===
Llanegwad 1910
Party	Candidate	Votes	%	±%
Independent	Richard Thomas*	207		
Independent	William Edwin Richards*	189		
Independent	Dan Davies*	182		
Independent	Mrs Nina Gwynne-Hughes	128		
Independent	Ivor Lloyd Davies	126		
Independent hold		Swing		
Independent hold		Swing		
Independent hold		Swing		

=== Llanfihangel Aberbythych (two seats) ===
Llanfihangel Aberbythych 1910
Party	Candidate	Votes	%	±%
Independent	David Watkins*	134		
Independent	David Morris	109		
Independent	William J. Evans	57		
Independent	James T. Stephens	53		
Independent hold		Swing		
Independent hold		Swing		

=== Llanfihangel Cilfragen (one seat) ===
Llanfihangel Cilfragen 1910
Party	Candidate	Votes	%	±%
Independent	Thomas Evans*	Unopposed		
Independent hold		Swing		

=== Llanfynydd (two seats) ===
David Thomas was re-elected on the returning officer's casting vote.

Llanfynydd 1910
Party	Candidate	Votes	%	±%
Independent	William Roberts*	93		
Independent	David Thomas*	85		
Independent	William Lewis	85		
Independent	Thomas Griffiths	36		
Independent hold		Swing		
Independent hold		Swing		

=== Llangathen (two seats) ===
Llangathen 1910
Party	Candidate	Votes	%	±%
Independent	William Griffiths*	79		
Independent	William Lewis*	79		
Independent	W. Rees Thomas			
Independent	John F. James	29		
Independent hold		Swing		
Independent hold		Swing		

=== Llansawel (two seats) ===
Llansawel 1910
Party	Candidate	Votes	%	±%
Independent	Thomas Davies*	Unopposed		
Independent	Lewis Bowen	Unopposed		
Independent hold		Swing		
Independent hold		Swing		

=== Quarter Bach No.1 (one seat) ===
Quarter Bach 1910
Party	Candidate	Votes	%	±%
Independent	Gomer Harries	77		
Independent	J.W. Morgan	76		
Independent	Thomas Howells	71		
Independent	J.D. Rees	17		
Independent hold		Swing		

=== Quarter Bach No.2 (one seat) ===
Quarter Bach 1910
Party	Candidate	Votes	%	±%
Independent	Rees Powell*	Unopposed		
Independent hold		Swing		

=== Talley (two seats) ===
Talley 1910
Party	Candidate	Votes	%	±%
Independent	Rev J. Alban Davies	Unopposed		
Independent	J.P. Griffiths	Unopposed		
Independent hold		Swing		
Independent hold		Swing		

== Llandeilo Board of Guardians ==
All members of the District Council also served as members of Llandeilo Board of Guardians. A further three Guardians were elected to represent the Llandeilo Urban District.

In addition, three Guardians were elected to represent the Ammanford Urban District which also lay within the remit of the Llandeilo Guardians. All three sitting members were returned although Henry Herbert, a member of the Guardians for 25 years, only secured a narrow majority over a Labour candidate.

=== Ammanford (three seats) ===
Ammanford 1910
Party	Candidate	Votes	%	±%
Independent	John Lewis*	689		
Independent	Rev John Morgans*	644		
Independent	Henry Herbert*	403		
Labour	R. Leonard	392		
Independent hold		Swing		
Independent hold		Swing		
Independent hold		Swing		

=== Llandeilo (three seats) ===
Llandeilo 1910
Party	Candidate	Votes	%	±%
Independent	Pritchard Davies*	Unopposed		
Independent	William Hopkins*	Unopposed		
Independent	Mrs E.A. Roberts*	Unopposed		
Independent hold		Swing		
Independent hold		Swing		
Independent hold		Swing		
