= 1901 Llandeilo Rural District Council election =

Welsh local election

The third election to the Llandeilo Rural District Council was held in March 1901. It was preceded by the 1898 election and followed by the 1904 election. The successful candidates were also elected to the Llandeilo Board of Guardians.

There were a number of unopposed returns in the rural parishes. In the industrial areas where the population was rapidly growing due to the anthracite coal industry most wards were contested.

== Boundary changes ==
Following the growth of the population in the parishes of Betws and Llandybie, boundaries were re-arranged and additional seats created. A notable casualty of this change was Henry Herbert, Chair of the Llandeilo Board of Guardians, who was defeated in the Llandybie Ward by two other sitting members.

== Ward results ==
=== Bettws (one seat) ===
Betws 1901
Party	Candidate	Votes	%	±%
Independent	David Morris	90		
Independent	Samuel Callard*	76		
Independent win (new seat)				

=== Bettws, Upper Ward (two seats) ===
Bettws, Upper Ward 1901
Party	Candidate	Votes	%	±%
Independent	Thomas Jones			
Independent	Lewis Jenkins			
Independent	John Evans			
Independent	Job Phillips			
Independent	William Roberts			
Independent win (new seat)				
Independent win (new seat)				

=== Brechfa (one seat) ===
Brechfa 1901
Party	Candidate	Votes	%	±%
Independent	Joseph Sivell	Unopposed		
Independent hold		Swing		

=== Glynamman (one seat) ===
Glynamman 1901
Party	Candidate	Votes	%	±%
Independent	David William Lewis*	Unopposed		
Independent hold		Swing		

=== Llandebie No.1 Ward (two seats) ===
Llandebie No.1 Ward 1901
Party	Candidate	Votes	%	±%
Independent	Jacob Davies*	159		
Independent	John Jones*	121		
Independent	Henry Herbert*	112		
Independent win (new seat)				
Independent win (new seat)				

=== Llandebie No.2, Ammanford (two seats) ===
Llandebie No.2, Ammanford 1901
Party	Candidate	Votes	%	±%
Independent	Maurice Ivor Morris	280		
Independent	John Thomas	188		
Independent	John Jones	127		
Independent	John Davies	101		
Independent win (new seat)				
Independent win (new seat)				

=== Llandebie No.3, Blaenau (two seats) ===
Llandebie No.3, Blaenau 1901
Party	Candidate	Votes	%	±%
Independent	David Davies*	256		
Independent	J. Lloyd	155		
Independent	George Rees	129		
Independent	T. Evans	94		
Independent win (new seat)				
Independent win (new seat)				

=== Llandeilo Fawr North Ward (three seats) ===
Llandeilo Fawr North Ward 1901
Party	Candidate	Votes	%	±%
Independent	John Perkins	224		
Independent	Joseph Harries*	213		
Independent	William Griffiths*	187		
Independent	David Watkins*	176		
Independent	Rev Thompson Jenkins (Caledfwlch)	127		
Independent	Evan Thomas	122		
Independent hold		Swing		
Independent hold		Swing		

=== Llandeilo Fawr South Ward (two seats) ===
Llandeilo Fawr South Ward 1901
Party	Candidate	Votes	%	±%
Independent	Mary Anne Jones	152		
Independent	L.N. Powell	141		
Independent	Caleb Thomas	121		
Independent hold		Swing		
Independent hold		Swing		

=== Llandyfeisant (one seat) ===
Llandyfeisant 1901
Party	Candidate	Votes	%	±%
Independent	James Ticehurst	Unopposed		
Independent hold		Swing		

=== Llanegwad (three seats) ===
Llanegwad 1901
Party	Candidate	Votes	%	±%
Independent	J. Morris	172		
Independent	Richard Thomas*	155		
Independent	Dan Davies	129		
Independent	J.G. Davies*	105		
Independent	W. Evans*	93		
Independent hold		Swing		
Independent hold		Swing		
Independent hold		Swing		

=== Llanfihangel Aberbythych (two seats) ===
Llanfihangel Aberbythych 1901
Party	Candidate	Votes	%	±%
Independent	D. Burnett	128		
Independent	R. James*	122		
Independent	D. Jones	96		
Independent hold		Swing		
Independent hold		Swing		

=== Llanfihangel Cilfragen (one seat) ===
Llanfihangel Cilfragen 1901
Party	Candidate	Votes	%	±%
Independent	Thomas Evans*	Unopposed		
Independent hold		Swing		

=== Llangathen (two seats) ===
Llangathen 1901
Party	Candidate	Votes	%	±%
Independent	Ebenezer Griffiths	121		
Independent	John Thomas	103		
Independent	Nathaniel Williams	57		
Independent hold		Swing		
Independent hold		Swing		

=== Llansawel (two seats) ===
Llansawel 1901
Party	Candidate	Votes	%	±%
Independent	Lewis Bowen	94		
Independent	Thomas Davies*	78		
Independent	James Thomas	66		
Independent hold		Swing		
Independent hold		Swing		

=== Quarter Bach No.1 (one seat) ===
Quarter Bach No.1 1901
Party	Candidate	Votes	%	±%
Independent	John Richard Jones	Unopposed		
Independent win (new seat)				

=== Quarter Bach No.2 (one seat) ===
Quarter Bach No.2 1901
Party	Candidate	Votes	%	±%
Independent	John Protheroe	Unopposed		
Independent win (new seat)				

=== Talley (two seats) ===
Talley 1901
Party	Candidate	Votes	%	±%
Independent	Thomas Rees*	Unopposed		
Independent	John Williams	Unopposed		
Independent hold		Swing		
Independent hold		Swing		
