= 1904 Llandeilo Rural District Council election =

Welsh local election

The fourth election to the Llandeilo Rural District Council was held in March 1904. It was preceded by the 1901 election and followed by the 1907 election. The successful candidates were also elected to the Llandeilo Board of Guardians.

There were a number of unopposed returns in the rural parishes.

== Boundary Changes ==
Following the formation of Ammanford Urban District Council in 1903, the number of seats for the Betws and Llandybie parishes were reduced as parts of these parishes formed the new Urban District.

== Ward results ==
=== Bettws (two seats) ===
Bettws, Upper Ward 1904
Party	Candidate	Votes	%	±%
Independent	Thomas Jones*			
Independent	David Morris*			
Independent	Job Phillips			
Independent	Thomas Thomas			
Independent win (new seat)				
Independent win (new seat)				

=== Brechfa (one seat) ===
Brechfa 1904
Party	Candidate	Votes	%	±%
Independent	Joseph Sivell	Unopposed		
Independent hold		Swing		

=== Glynamman (one seat) ===
Glynamman 1904
Party	Candidate	Votes	%	±%
Independent	David William Lewis*	Unopposed		
Independent hold		Swing		

=== Llandebie (two seats) ===
Llandebie 1904
Party	Candidate	Votes	%	±%
Independent	Jacob Davies*	179		
Independent	John Jones*	157		
Independent	John Hopkins	110		
Independent win (new seat)				
Independent win (new seat)				

=== Llandebie, Blaenau (two seats) ===
Llandebie, Blaenau 1904
Party	Candidate	Votes	%	±%
Independent	David Davies*	256		
Independent	J. Lloyd	155		
Independent	George Rees	129		
Independent	T. Evans	94		
Independent win (new seat)				
Independent win (new seat)				

=== Llandeilo Fawr North Ward (three seats) ===
Llandeilo Fawr North Ward 1904
Party	Candidate	Votes	%	±%
Independent	William Griffiths*	305		
Independent	John Perkins*	285		
Independent	Joseph Harries*	246		
Independent	Rev Thompson Jenkins	144		
Independent hold		Swing		
Independent hold		Swing		
Independent hold		Swing		

=== Llandeilo Fawr South Ward (two seats) ===
Llandeilo Fawr South Ward 1904
Party	Candidate	Votes	%	±%
Independent	Mary Anne Jones*			
Independent	Lewis Nathaniel Powell*			
Independent	William Simon			
Independent hold		Swing		
Independent hold		Swing		

=== Llandyfeisant (one seat) ===
Llandyfeisant 1904
Party	Candidate	Votes	%	±%
Independent	James Ticehurst	Unopposed		
Independent hold		Swing		

=== Llanegwad (three seats) ===
J.G. Davies won back the seat he lost three years previously.

Llanegwad 1904
Party	Candidate	Votes	%	±%
Independent	Dan Davies*	216		
Independent	John George Davies	180		
Independent	Richard Thomas*	175		
Independent	William Evans	105		
Independent hold		Swing		
Independent hold		Swing		
Independent hold		Swing		

=== Llanfihangel Aberbythych (two seats) ===
Llanfihangel Aberbythych 1904
Party	Candidate	Votes	%	±%
Independent	David Burnett*	Unopposed		
Independent	Roderick James*	Unopposed		
Independent hold		Swing		
Independent hold		Swing		

=== Llanfihangel Cilfragen (one seat) ===
Llanfihangel Cilfragen 1904
Party	Candidate	Votes	%	±%
Independent	Thomas Evans*	Unopposed		
Independent hold		Swing		

=== Llanfynydd (two seats) ===
Llanfynydd 1904
Party	Candidate	Votes	%	±%
Independent	David Davies*	91		
Independent	David Gwynne*	84		
Independent	Evan Lewis	77		
Independent	John Jones	19		
Independent hold		Swing		
Independent hold		Swing		

=== Llangathen (two seats) ===
Llangathen 1904
Party	Candidate	Votes	%	±%
Independent	Ebenezer Griffiths*	Unopposed		
Independent	W.R. Thomas*	Unopposed		
Independent hold		Swing		
Independent hold		Swing		

=== Llansawel (two seats) ===
Llansawel 1904
Party	Candidate	Votes	%	±%
Independent	Lewis Bowen*	Unopposed		
Independent	Thomas Davies*	Unopposed		
Independent hold		Swing		
Independent hold		Swing		

=== Quarter Bach No.1 (one seat) ===
Quarter Bach No.1 1904
Party	Candidate	Votes	%	±%
Independent	John Llewellyn	Unopposed		
Independent hold		Swing		

=== Quarter Bach No.2 (one seat) ===
Quarter Bach No.2 1904
Party	Candidate	Votes	%	±%
Independent	Rees Powell	Unopposed		
Independent hold		Swing		

=== Talley (two seats) ===
Talley 1901
Party	Candidate	Votes	%	±%
Independent	Thomas Rees*	Unopposed		
Independent	John Williams	Unopposed		
Independent hold		Swing		
Independent hold		Swing		
