= 1934 Llandeilo Rural District Council election =

1934 Welsh local government election

An election to the Llandeilo Rural District Council was held on 26 March 1934. It was preceded by the 1931 election and followed by the 1937 election.

This was the last election conducted prior to the implementation of a review into district boundaries in Carmarthenshire. Following a recommendation made in 1932, it was decided that the rural districts of Llandeilo and Llandovery would be merged.

A partial election would be held in 1935 in seats where wards would be amalgamated or the number of seats reduced as a result of re-organization. Members unaffected by the changes would remain in post. The 1937 election would be the first time that a whole council would be elected for the merged authority.

There were unopposed returns in eleven wards.

== Candidates ==
Independents continued to be the only candidates nominated in the rural wards; many of whom were returned unopposed. Labour contested all of the industrial area wards and won the majority of them. No nominations were initially received for the Heolddu ward.

== Outcome ==
A similar pattern to recent elections was observed at the election, with Labour candidates contesting the urban wards but Independents being returned for the rural areas.

The only change was in the Betws ward where Labour lost a seat to an Independent candidate. In Llandeilo South Ward, Thomas Morris lost his seat after over twenty years.

== Ward results ==
=== Betws (three seats) ===
Betws 1934
Party	Candidate	Votes	%	±%
Independent	David Emrys Harries	240		
Independent	David Daniel Thomas*	193		
Independent Labour	D. Glyn Jenkins*	187		
Labour	David Bowen*	181		
Independent gain from Labour		Swing		
Independent hold		Swing		
Independent Labour hold		Swing		

=== Brechfa (one seat) ===
Brechfa 1934
Party	Candidate	Votes	%	±%
Independent	Joseph Sivell	Unopposed		
Independent hold		Swing		

=== Glynamman (one seat) ===
Glynamman 1934
Party	Candidate	Votes	%	±%
Independent	John George*	401		
Labour	William Connick	350		
Independent	John Walters	179		
Labour	Jeffrey H. Moses	132		
Independent hold		Swing		
Labour hold		Swing		

=== Heolddu (one seat) ===
Heolddu 1931
Party	Candidate	Votes	%	±%
Independent	Moses Williams	Unopposed		
Independent hold		Swing		

=== Llandebie (three seats) ===
Llandebie 1934
Party	Candidate	Votes	%	±%
Labour	Benjamin Bevan*	Unopposed		
Independent	Frederick Davies*	Unopposed		
Labour	William Morris	Unopposed		
Labour hold		Swing		
Independent hold		Swing		
Labour hold		Swing		

=== Llandeilo Fawr North Ward (three seats) ===
Llandeilo Fawr North Ward 1934
Party	Candidate	Votes	%	±%
Independent	Thomas Morgan*	Unopposed		
Independent	James Thomas*	Unopposed		
Independent	William Williams*	Unopposed		
Independent hold		Swing		
Independent hold		Swing		
Independent hold		Swing		

=== Llandeilo Fawr South Ward (two seats) ===
Llandeilo Fawr South Ward 1934
Party	Candidate	Votes	%	±%
Independent	John Lewis Evans	325		
Labour	Robert A. Allan	295		
Independent	Thomas Morris*	260		
Independent hold		Swing		
Labour gain from Independent		Swing		

=== Llandyfeisant (one seat) ===
Llandyfeisant 1934
Party	Candidate	Votes	%	±%
Independent	Henry Brookshaw	Unopposed		
Independent hold		Swing		

=== Llanegwad (three seats) ===
Llanegwad 1934
Party	Candidate	Votes	%	±%
Independent	Ben Davies*	Unopposed		
Independent	Dan Davies*	Unopposed		
Independent	Richard Thomas*	Unopposed		
Independent hold		Swing		
Independent hold		Swing		
Independent hold		Swing		

=== Llanfihangel Aberbythych North Ward (one seat) ===
Llanfihangel Aberbythych North Ward 1934
Party	Candidate	Votes	%	±%
Independent	Tom Hopkins	Unopposed		
Independent hold		Swing		

=== Llanfihangel Aberbythych South Ward (two seats) ===
Llanfihangel Aberbythych South Ward 1934
Party	Candidate	Votes	%	±%
Independent	David Jones*	Unopposed		
Independent	Henry Jones*	Unopposed		
Independent hold		Swing		
Independent hold		Swing		

=== Llanfihangel Cilfragen (one seat) ===
Llanfihangel Cilfragen 1934
Party	Candidate	Votes	%	±%
Independent	T.W. Griffiths*	Unopposed		
Independent hold		Swing		

=== Llanfynydd (two seats) ===
Llanfynydd 1919
Party	Candidate	Votes	%	±%
Independent	Daniel Lloyd	Unopposed		
Independent	David Thomas*	Unopposed		
Independent hold		Swing		
Independent hold		Swing		

=== Llangathen (two seats) ===
Llangathen 1934
Party	Candidate	Votes	%	±%
Independent	T.J. Williams	165		
Independent	Nurse E.A. Olley	161		
Independent	Thomas Lewis	131		
Independent hold		Swing		
Independent hold		Swing		

=== Llansawel (two seats) ===
Llansawel 1934
Party	Candidate	Votes	%	±%
Independent	John James Thomas	142		
Independent	Thomas Humphreys*	123		
Independent	David Morgan*	116		
Independent hold		Swing		
Independent hold		Swing		

=== Penygroes (two seats) ===
Penygroes 1934
Party	Candidate	Votes	%	±%
Independent	William Williams*	594		
Labour	Rees Rees*	464		
Labour	David Davies	407		
Independent hold		Swing		
Labour hold		Swing		

=== Quarter Bach No.1 (one seat) ===
Quarter Bach 1934
Party	Candidate	Votes	%	±%
Labour	William W. Davies*	Unopposed		
Labour	Enoch Isaac*	Unopposed		
Labour hold		Swing		
Labour hold		Swing		

=== Quarter Bach No.2 (two seats) ===
Quarter Bach No.2 1934
Party	Candidate	Votes	%	±%
Labour	David Davies*	Unopposed		
Labour	Ioan Pugh*	Unopposed		
Labour hold		Swing		
Labour hold		Swing		

=== Talley (two seats) ===
Talley 1934
Party	Candidate	Votes	%	±%
Independent	John Davies	Unopposed		
Independent	Simon M. Jones	Unopposed		
Independent hold		Swing		
Independent hold		Swing		

=== Saron (two seats) ===
Saron 1934
Party	Candidate	Votes	%	±%
Labour	Evan Bevan*	Unopposed		
Labour	John Bevan*	Unopposed		
Labour hold		Swing		
Labour hold		Swing		
