= 1931 Llandeilo Rural District Council election =

1931 Welsh local government election

An election to the Llandeilo Rural District Council was held in April 1931. It was preceded by the 1928 election and followed by the 1934 election. There were unopposed returns in eight wards.

The Llandeilo Board of Guardians had been abolished in 1930.

== Candidates ==
The vast majority of candidates were either Independent or Labour (the latter all in the rural areas). Some Independent Labour candidates contested seats, usually as a result of disagreements between trade unions. In Glynamman, the two retiring members stood on different platforms to three years earlier, with former Independent William Watkin Davies running as a Labour candidate and D.J. Pritchard, elected as a British Legion candidate, defending his seat as an Independent.

== Overview of the result ==
A similar pattern to recent elections was observed at the election, with Labour candidates contesting the urban wards but Independents being returned for the rural areas.

== Ward results ==
=== Betws (three seats) ===
Betws 1931
| Party | Candidate | Votes | % | ±% |
|---|---|---|---|---|
| Labour | David Bowen* | Unopposed | | |
| Independent Labour | D. Glyn Jenkins* | Unopposed | | |
| Independent | David Daniel Thomas* | Unopposed | | |
| Labour hold | | Swing | | |
| Independent Labour hold | | Swing | | |
| Independent hold | | Swing | | |

=== Brechfa (one seat) ===
Brechfa 1931
| Party | Candidate | Votes | % | ±% |
|---|---|---|---|---|
| Independent | Joseph Sivell | Unopposed | | |
| Independent hold | | Swing | | |

=== Glynamman (one seat) ===
Glynamman 1931
| Party | Candidate | Votes | % | ±% |
|---|---|---|---|---|
| Independent | John George* | 417 | | |
| Labour | William Connick | 276 | | |
| Independent | Rhys Thomas | 244 | | |
| Independent hold | | Swing | | |
| Labour hold | | Swing | | |

=== Heolddu (one seat) ===
Heolddu 1931
| Party | Candidate | Votes | % | ±% |
|---|---|---|---|---|
| Independent | Moses Williams | Unopposed | | |
| Independent hold | | Swing | | |

=== Llandebie (three seats) ===
Llandebie 1931
| Party | Candidate | Votes | % | ±% |
|---|---|---|---|---|
| Labour | Dr J. Shibko | 595 | | |
| Independent | Frederick Davies* | 510 | | |
| Labour | Benjamin Bevan | 508 | | |
| Independent | David Lewis Thomas* | 448 | | |
| Independent | Theophilus Harris | 385 | | |
| Labour hold | | Swing | | |
| Independent hold | | Swing | | |
| Labour gain from Independent | | Swing | | |

=== Llandeilo Fawr North Ward (two seats) ===
Llandeilo Fawr North Ward 1928
| Party | Candidate | Votes | % | ±% |
|---|---|---|---|---|
| Independent | T. Morgan* | 444 | | |
| Independent | W. Williams* | 433 | | |
| Independent | James Thomas | 350 | | |
| Independent | Roderick Evans | 246 | | |
| Independent hold | | Swing | | |
| Independent hold | | Swing | | |

=== Llandeilo Fawr South Ward (two seats) ===
Llandeilo Fawr South Ward 1931
| Party | Candidate | Votes | % | ±% |
|---|---|---|---|---|
| Independent | Thomas Morris* | 295 | | |
| Independent | David G. Williams | 260 | | |
| Labour | Robert A. Allan | 230 | | |
| Independent hold | | Swing | | |
| Independent hold | | Swing | | |

=== Llandyfeisant (one seat) ===
Llandyfeisant 1931
| Party | Candidate | Votes | % | ±% |
|---|---|---|---|---|
| Independent | Lord Dynevor* | Unopposed | | |
| Independent hold | | Swing | | |

=== Llanegwad (three seats) ===
Llanegwad 1931
| Party | Candidate | Votes | % | ±% |
|---|---|---|---|---|
| Independent | Ben Davies | Unopposed | | |
| Independent | Dan Davies* | Unopposed | | |
| Independent | Richard Thomas* | Unopposed | | |
| Independent hold | | Swing | | |
| Independent hold | | Swing | | |
| Independent hold | | Swing | | |

=== Llanfihangel Aberbythych (two seats) ===
Llanfihangel Aberbythych 1931
| Party | Candidate | Votes | % | ±% |
|---|---|---|---|---|
| Independent | David Jones* | 231 | | |
| Independent | Henry Jones | 206 | | |
| Independent | William A. Jones* | 197 | | |
| Independent hold | | Swing | | |
| Independent hold | | Swing | | |

=== Llanfihangel Cilfragen (one seat) ===
Llanfihangel Cilfragen 1931
| Party | Candidate | Votes | % | ±% |
|---|---|---|---|---|
| Independent | T.W. Griffiths | Unopposed | | |
| Independent hold | | Swing | | |

=== Llanfynydd (two seats) ===
Llanfynydd 1919
| Party | Candidate | Votes | % | ±% |
|---|---|---|---|---|
| Independent | Daniel Lloyd | Unopposed | | |
| Independent | David Thomas* | Unopposed | | |
| Independent hold | | Swing | | |
| Independent hold | | Swing | | |

=== Llangathen (two seats) ===
Llangathen 1931
| Party | Candidate | Votes | % | ±% |
|---|---|---|---|---|
| Independent | Nurse E.A. Olley | Unopposed | | |
| Independent | T.J. Williams | Unopposed | | |
| Independent hold | | Swing | | |
| Independent hold | | Swing | | |

=== Llansawel (two seats) ===
Llansawel 1919
| Party | Candidate | Votes | % | ±% |
|---|---|---|---|---|
| Independent | J. Thomas | 119 | | |
| Independent | Thomas Humphreys* | 195 | | |
| Independent | John Morgan | 85 | | |
| Independent | J. Jones | 37 | | |
| Independent hold | | Swing | | |
| Independent hold | | Swing | | |

=== Penygroes (two seats) ===
Penygroes 1931
| Party | Candidate | Votes | % | ±% |
|---|---|---|---|---|
| Independent | William Williams* | 603 | | |
| Labour | Rees Rees* | 391 | | |
| Labour | William H. Williams | 334 | | |
| Independent hold | | Swing | | |
| Labour hold | | Swing | | |

=== Quarter Bach No.1 (one seat) ===
Quarter Bach 1931
| Party | Candidate | Votes | % | ±% |
|---|---|---|---|---|
| Labour | William W. Davies* | 391 | | |
| Labour | Enoch Isaac | 374 | | |
| Independent | Daniel Bowen | 190 | | |
| Independent | D.J. Pritchard* | 75 | | |
| Labour gain from British Legion | | Swing | | |
| Labour gain from Independent | | Swing | | |

=== Quarter Bach No.2 (two seats) ===
Quarter Bach No.2 1931
| Party | Candidate | Votes | % | ±% |
|---|---|---|---|---|
| Labour | David Davies* | Unopposed | | |
| Labour | Ioan Pugh | Unopposed | | |
| Labour hold | | Swing | | |
| Labour hold | | Swing | | |

=== Talley (two seats) ===
Talley 1919
| Party | Candidate | Votes | % | ±% |
|---|---|---|---|---|
| Independent | John Thomas Morgan | Unopposed | | |
| Independent | David Edwin Thomas | Unopposed | | |
| Independent hold | | Swing | | |
| Independent hold | | Swing | | |

=== Saron (two seats) ===
Saron 1931
| Party | Candidate | Votes | % | ±% |
|---|---|---|---|---|
| Labour | Evan Bevan* | Unopposed | | |
| Labour | John Bevan* | Unopposed | | |
| Labour hold | | Swing | | |
| Labour hold | | Swing | | |
