= 1928 Llandeilo Rural District Council election =

Welsh local election

An election to the Llandeilo Rural District Council was held in April 1928. It was preceded by the 1925 election and followed by the 1931 election. The successful candidates were also elected to the Llandeilo Board of Guardians. A small number of seats were unopposed.

== Overview of the result ==
A similar pattern to recent elections was observed at the election, with Labour candidates contesting the urban wards but Independents being returned for the rural areas.

== Ward results ==
=== Betws (three seats) ===
Betws 1928
Party	Candidate	Votes	%	±%
Independent Labour	D. Glyn Jenkins*	146		
Labour	David Bowen	128		
Independent	David Daniel Thomas	119		
Labour	G. Davies	101		
Labour	T. Rees	94		
Labour	Henry Davies*	64		
Independent Labour gain from Labour		Swing		
Independent hold		Swing		
Labour hold		Swing		

=== Brechfa (one seat) ===
Brechfa 1928
Party	Candidate	Votes	%	±%
Independent	Cyril Joynson	17		
Independent	James Davies	13		
Independent hold		Swing		

=== Glynamman (one seat) ===
Glynamman 1919
Party	Candidate	Votes	%	±%
Independent	William Walters	Unopposed		
Independent hold		Swing		

=== Heolddu (one seat) ===
Heolddu 1925
Party	Candidate	Votes	%	±%
Independent	D. Thomas*	Unopposed		
Independent hold		Swing		

=== Llandebie (three seats) ===
Llandebie 1928
Party	Candidate	Votes	%	±%
Independent	David Lewis Thomas*	534		
Independent	Frederick Davies*	510		
Labour	Dr J. Shibko	476		
Independent	John Lewis*	450		
Labour	Daniel Jenkins	301		
Labour	G. Thomas	297		
Independent hold		Swing		
Independent hold		Swing		
Labour gain from Independent		Swing		

=== Llandeilo Fawr North Ward (two seats) ===
Llandeilo Fawr North Ward 1928
Party	Candidate	Votes	%	±%
Independent	Thomas Morgan*	444		
Independent	William Williams*	433		
Independent	James Thomas	350		
Independent	Roderick Evans	246		
Independent hold		Swing		
Independent hold		Swing		
Independent hold		Swing		

=== Llandeilo Fawr South Ward (two seats) ===
Llandeilo Fawr South Ward 1919
Party	Candidate	Votes	%	±%
Independent	L.N. Powell*	238		
Independent	Thomas Morris*	228		
Independent	Mrs Phillips	195		
Independent	Thomas James	54		
Independent hold		Swing		
Independent hold		Swing		

=== Llandyfeisant (one seat) ===
Llandyfeisant 1928
Party	Candidate	Votes	%	±%
Independent	Lord Dynevor*	Unopposed		
Independent hold		Swing		

=== Llanegwad (three seats) ===
Llanegwad 1919
Party	Candidate	Votes	%	±%
Independent	Dan Davies*	Unopposed		
Independent	William Edwin Richards*	Unopposed		
Independent	Richard Thomas*	Unopposed		
Independent hold		Swing		
Independent hold		Swing		
Independent hold		Swing		

=== Llanfihangel Aberbythych (two seats) ===
Llanfihangel Aberbythych 1919
Party	Candidate	Votes	%	±%
Independent	Tom Rees*	203		
Independent	William Stephens*	140		
Independent	William John Evans	135		
Labour	Henry Jones	134		
Labour	James Thomas Stephens	60		
Independent hold		Swing		
Independent hold		Swing		

=== Llanfihangel Cilfragen (one seat) ===
Llanfihangel Cilfragen 1919
Party	Candidate	Votes	%	±%
Independent	Thomas Evans*	Unopposed		
Independent hold		Swing		

=== Llanfynydd (two seats) ===
Llanfynydd 1919
Party	Candidate	Votes	%	±%
Independent	Daniel Lloyd	Unopposed		
Independent	David Thomas*	Unopposed		
Independent hold		Swing		
Independent hold		Swing		

=== Llangathen (two seats) ===
Llangathen 1919
Party	Candidate	Votes	%	±%
Independent	David Williams	166		
Independent	William Lewis*	129		
Independent	William Rees	74		
Independent	D.W. Morgans	41		
Independent hold		Swing		
Independent hold		Swing		

=== Llansawel (two seats) ===
This was the only contest in a rural ward at the election.

Llansawel 1919
Party	Candidate	Votes	%	±%
Independent	J. Thomas	119		
Independent	Thomas Humphreys*	195		
Independent	John Morgan	85		
Independent	J. Jones	37		
Independent hold		Swing		
Independent hold		Swing		

=== Penygroes (two seats) ===
Penygroes 1928
Party	Candidate	Votes	%	±%
Independent	William Williams*	559		
Labour	Rees Rees*	433		
Liberal	D.J. Lake	238		
Labour	William H. Williams	211		
Independent hold		Swing		
Labour hold		Swing		

=== Quarter Bach No.1 (one seat) ===
Quarter Bach 1928
Party	Candidate	Votes	%	±%
British Legion	D.J. Pritchard	343		
Independent	William W. Davies	312		
Labour	Enoch Isaac*	260		
Labour	Daniel Bowen*	165		
British Legion gain from Labour		Swing		
Independent gain from Labour		Swing		

=== Quarter Bach No.2 (two seats) ===
Quarter Bach No.2 1928
Party	Candidate	Votes	%	±%
Labour	David Davies*	Unopposed		
Labour	John Hughes*	Unopposed		
Labour hold		Swing		
Labour hold		Swing		

=== Talley (two seats) ===
Talley 1919
Party	Candidate	Votes	%	±%
Independent	John Thomas Morgan	Unopposed		
Independent	David Edwin Thomas	Unopposed		
Independent hold		Swing		
Independent hold		Swing		

=== Saron (two seats) ===
Saron 1928
Party	Candidate	Votes	%	±%
Labour	Evan Bevan*	649		
Labour	John Bevan*	648		
Independent	J. Jenkins	228		
Labour hold		Swing		
Labour hold		Swing		

== Llandeilo Board of Guardians ==
All members of the District Council also served as members of Llandeilo Board of Guardians. In addition, three Guardians were elected to represent the Ammanford Urban District and another three to represent the Cwmamman Urban District, both of which also lay within the remit of the Llandeilo Guardians. A further three Guardians were elected to represent the Llandeilo Urban District.

Elected candidates at both Ammanford and Cwmamman stood specifically as Liberals, in contrast to the non-political nature of previous Guardians elections.

=== Ammanford (three seats) ===
The three sitting members, including Henry Herbert, a Guardian for nearly forty years, were re-elected.

Ammanford 1919
Party	Candidate	Votes	%	±%
Liberal	John Lewis*	1,325		
Liberal	Rev John Morgans*	1,144		
Liberal	Henry Herbert*	871		
Labour	William Cathan Davies	602		
Labour	D. Rufus Evans	424		
Labour	Arthur Edgar Thomas	417		
Liberal hold		Swing		
Liberal hold		Swing		
Liberal hold		Swing		

=== Cwmamman (three seats) ===
Cwmamman 1928
Party	Candidate	Votes	%	±%
Labour	Thomas Henry Jones*	Unopposed		
Labour	William Roberts*	Unopposed		
Liberal	Arthur Williams*	Unopposed		
Labour hold		Swing		
Labour hold		Swing		
Liberal hold		Swing		

=== Llandeilo (three seats) ===
Llandeilo 1928
Party	Candidate	Votes	%	±%
Independent	Elizabeth Evans*	414		
Independent	David Pritchard Davies*	410		
Independent	Edith Jane Roberts*	397		
Independent	John Harries	296		
Independent	Percy Hopkins	289		
Independent hold		Swing		
Independent hold		Swing		
Independent hold		Swing		
