= 1937 Llandeilo Rural District Council election =

1937 Welsh local government election

An election to the Llandeilo Rural District Council in Wales was held on 5 April 1937.

It was preceded by the 1934 election but some wards had been contested in 1935 following the amalgamation of Llandovery RDC. Due to the Second World War it was followed by the 1946 election.

== Candidates ==
Independents continued to be the only candidates nominated in the rural wards; many of whom were returned unopposed. Labour contested all of the industrial area wards and won the majority of them. Seventeen members were returned unopposed; fourteen of whom were Independents.

== Outcome ==
A similar pattern to recent elections was observed at the election, with Labour candidates contesting the urban wards but Independents being returned for the rural areas.

Labour lost two seats, at Glynamman and in the Llandeilo South Ward, where Robert Allan lost the seat he captured from long-standing member Thomas Morris three years earlier.

== Ward results ==
=== Betws Lower (one seat) ===
Betws Lower 1937
Party	Candidate	Votes	%	±%
Labour	David Bowen*	146		
Independent	D. Glyn Jenkins	128		
Labour win (new seat)				

=== Betws Upper (one seat) ===
Betws Upper 1937
Party	Candidate	Votes	%	±%
Independent	David Daniel Thomas	70		
Labour	George David	63		
Independent win (new seat)				

=== Brechfa (one seat) ===
Brechfa 1937
Party	Candidate	Votes	%	±%
Independent	David Davies	Unopposed		
Independent hold		Swing		

=== Cilycwm (one seat) ===
Cilycwm 1937
Party	Candidate	Votes	%	±%
Independent	Ivor Elystan Campbell-Davys	Unopposed		
Independent hold		Swing		

=== Conwil Caio (two seats) ===
Conwil Caio 1935
Party	Candidate	Votes	%	±%
Independent	Thomas Davies*	Unopposed		
Independent	Jane Williams*	Unopposed		
Independent win (new seat)				
Independent win (new seat)				

=== Glynamman (one seat) ===
Glynamman 1937
Party	Candidate	Votes	%	±%
Independent	John George*	Unopposed		
Labour	William Connick	Unopposed		
Independent hold		Swing		
Labour hold		Swing		

=== Heolddu (one seat) ===
Heolddu 1937
Party	Candidate	Votes	%	±%
Independent	Olney Morgan Bevan	Unopposed		
Independent hold		Swing		

=== Llanddeusant (one seat) ===
Llanddeusant 1937
Party	Candidate	Votes	%	±%
Independent	David Evans*	119		
Independent	John Thomas	61		
Independent hold		Swing		

=== Llandebie (two seats) ===
Llandebie 1937
Party	Candidate	Votes	%	±%
Labour	Alfred Bowen Thomas*	776		
Labour	William Morris*	648		
Independent	David Harries	534		
Labour hold		Swing		
Labour hold		Swing		

=== Llandeilo Fawr North Ward (three seats) ===
Llandeilo Fawr North Ward 1934
Party	Candidate	Votes	%	±%
Independent	Thomas Morgan*	Unopposed		
Independent	James Thomas*	Unopposed		
Independent	William Williams*	Unopposed		
Independent hold		Swing		
Independent hold		Swing		
Independent hold		Swing		

=== Llandeilo Fawr South Ward (two seats) ===
Llandeilo Fawr South Ward 1937
Party	Candidate	Votes	%	±%
Independent	William John Thomas	506		
Independent	Thomas John Jones	407		
Labour	Robert A. Allan*	230		
Independent	A. Thomas	139		
Independent hold		Swing		
Independent gain from Labour		Swing		

=== Llandingat Without (one seat) ===
Llandingat Without 1937
Party	Candidate	Votes	%	±%
Independent	Douglas T.M. Jones	Unopposed		
Independent hold		Swing		

=== Llandyfeisant (one seat) ===
Llandyfeisant 1937
Party	Candidate	Votes	%	±%
Independent	Henry Brookshaw*	Unopposed		
Independent hold		Swing		

=== Llanegwad (three seats) ===
Llanegwad 1937
Party	Candidate	Votes	%	±%
Independent	Ben Davies*	Unopposed		
Independent	Dan Davies*	Unopposed		
Independent hold		Swing		
Independent hold		Swing		

=== Llanfair-ar-y-Bryn (one seat) ===
Llanfair-ar-y-Bryn 1937
Party	Candidate	Votes	%	±%
Independent	Rees Evans	Unopposed		
Independent hold		Swing		

=== Llanfihangel Aberbythych North Ward (one seat) ===
Llanfihangel Aberbythych North Ward 1937
Party	Candidate	Votes	%	±%
Independent	Tom Hopkins	Unopposed		
Independent hold		Swing		

=== Llanfihangel Aberbythych South Ward (one seat) ===
Llanfihangel Aberbythych South Ward 1937
Party	Candidate	Votes	%	±%
Independent	David Jones*	Unopposed		
Independent hold		Swing		

=== Llanfynydd (two seats) ===
Llanfynydd 1919
Party	Candidate	Votes	%	±%
Independent	Daniel Lloyd	Unopposed		
Independent	David Thomas*	Unopposed		
Independent hold		Swing		
Independent hold		Swing		

=== Llangadock (two seats) ===
Llangadock 1937
Party	Candidate	Votes	%	±%
Independent	Thomas Jones	268		
Independent	Joseph Llewelleyn Evans*	299		
Independent	David John Daniel	246		
Independent	Willam Jones	242		
Independent	Henry William Seale*	42		
Independent hold		Swing		
Independent hold		Swing		

=== Llangathen (one seat) ===
Llangathen 1937
Party	Candidate	Votes	%	±%
Independent	Nurse E.A. Olley	Unopposed		
Independent hold		Swing		

=== Llansadwrn (one seat) ===
Llansadwrn 1937
Party	Candidate	Votes	%	±%
Independent	Benjamin Tudor Lewis	166		
Independent	Rachel M. Rees*	141		
Independent hold		Swing		

=== Llansawel (two seats) ===
Llansawel 1934
Party	Candidate	Votes	%	±%
Independent	John James Thomas	142		
Independent	Thomas Humphreys*	123		
Independent	David Morgan*	116		
Independent hold		Swing		
Independent hold		Swing		

=== Llanwrda (one seat) ===
Llanwrda 1937
Party	Candidate	Votes	%	±%
Independent	Thomas Rees Griffiths	Unopposed		
Independent hold		Swing		

=== Myddfai (one seat) ===
Myddfai 1937
Party	Candidate	Votes	%	±%
Independent	David Davies*	Unopposed		
Independent hold		Swing		

=== Penygroes (two seats) ===
Penygroes 1937
Party	Candidate	Votes	%	±%
Independent	William Williams*	776		
Labour	Rees Rees*	597		
Labour	John Evans	541		
Independent hold		Swing		
Labour hold		Swing		

=== Quarter Bach No.1 (one seat) ===
Quarter Bach No.1 1937
Party	Candidate	Votes	%	±%
Labour	Enoch Isaac*	374		
Independent	Walter Howells	314		
Labour	Henry J. Thomas	264		
Independent	Mrs C.M. Jones	190		
Independent	David John Bowen	111		
Labour hold		Swing		
Independent gain from Labour		Swing		

=== Quarter Bach No.2 (two seats) ===
Quarter Bach No.2 1934
Party	Candidate	Votes	%	±%
Labour	David Davies*	Unopposed		
Labour	Ioan Pugh*	Unopposed		
Labour hold		Swing		
Labour hold		Swing		

=== Talley (one seat) ===
Talley 1937
Party	Candidate	Votes	%	±%
Independent	Daniel Williams*	Unopposed		
Independent hold		Swing		

=== Saron (two seats) ===
Saron 1937
Party	Candidate	Votes	%	±%
Labour	Evan Bevan*	Unopposed		
Labour	John Bevan*	Unopposed		
Labour hold		Swing		
Labour hold		Swing		
