= Trelech (electoral ward) =

Electoral ward in Carmarthenshire, Wales

Coordinates: 51.884°N 4.467°W

Trelech is an electoral ward for Carmarthenshire County Council in Carmarthenshire, Wales. It is represented by one county councillor.

== Description ==
As well as the community of Trelech, the ward also covers the neighbouring communities of Abernant, Llanwinio, Meidrim and Newchurch and Merthyr. It includes the villages and settlements of Abernant, Blaenwaun, Cwmbach, Drefach, Felin-pandy, Gellywen, Llanwinio, Merthyr, Pen-y-bont, Talog and Trelech. The population of this ward at the 2011 census was 2,072.

A 2019 boundary review by the Local Government Boundary Commission for Wales recommended the Newchurch and Merthyr community be added to the Trelech ward. Newchurch and Merthyr had previously been part of the neighbouring Cynwyl Elfed ward. The change was to take effect from the May 2022 local elections.

== Representation ==
Trelech has been an electoral ward to Carmarthenshire County Council since 1995, represented by one county councillor.

== Elections ==
No elections took place in 1995, 1999 or 2004 because only one candidate stood for the ward, William David (Dai) Thomas, standing as an independent.

=== 2014 by-election ===
Thomas stood down as county councillor in late 2014, shortly after his 90th birthday. He had been a councillor for the area for 50 years and was known as Dai Trelech. A by-election was called, which was won by Plaid Cymru with a 33.6% increase in the party's vote share.

Trelech by-election, 11 December 2014
Party	Candidate	Votes	%	±%
Plaid Cymru	Jean Lewis	598	68.3	
Independent	Hugh Phillips	181	20.7	
Liberal Democrats	Selwyn John Runnett	96	11.0	
