= Trelech =

Village and community in Carmarthenshire, Wales

Coordinates: 51°56′43″N 4°30′02″W

- Village and community
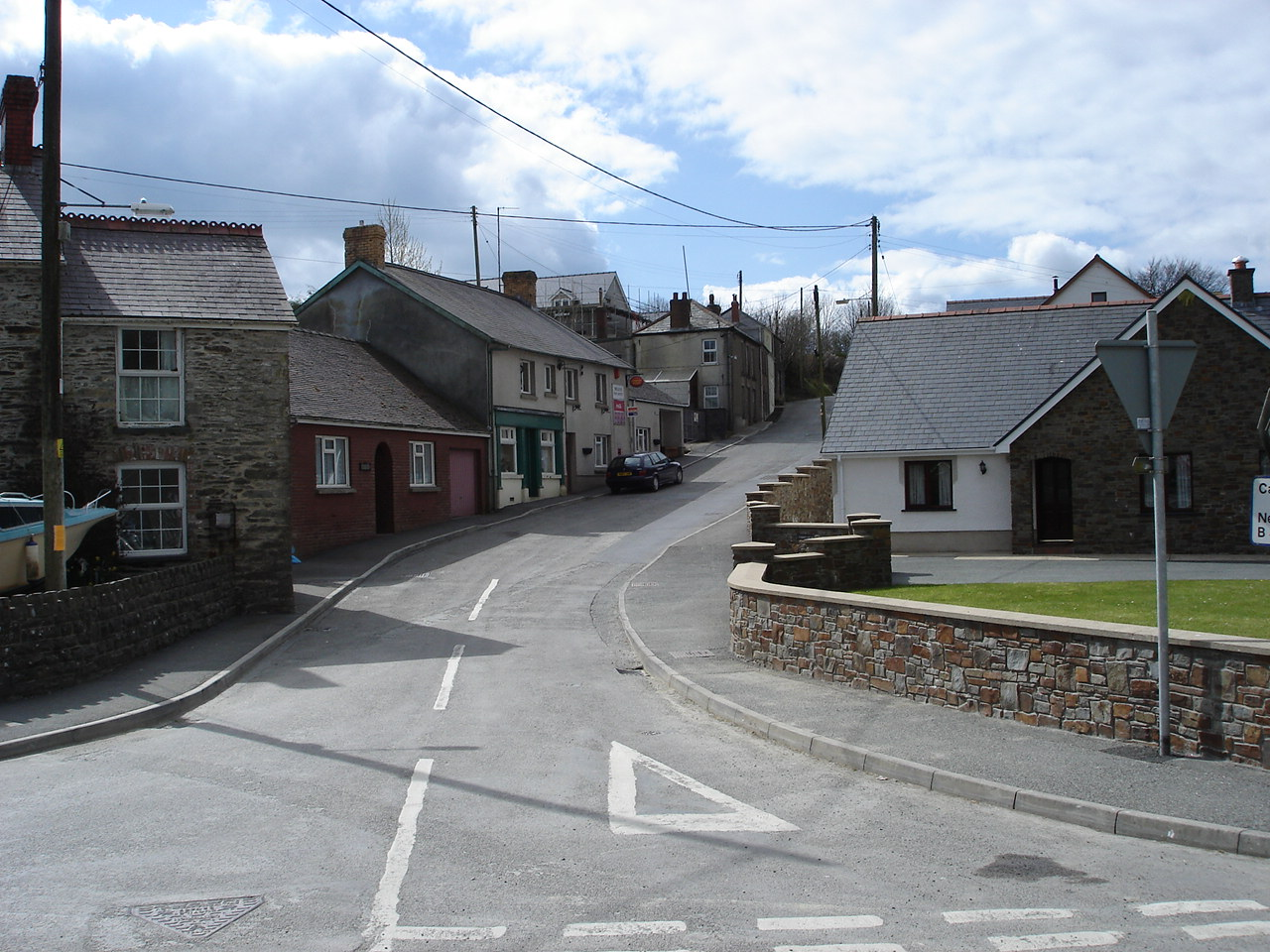
- Trelech village

- Location within Carmarthenshire
- Principal area: Carmarthenshire
- Country: Wales
- Sovereign state: United Kingdom
- Police: Dyfed-Powys
- Fire: Mid and West Wales
- Ambulance: Welsh
- List of places UK Wales Carmarthenshire Map of the community

Trelech (Welsh: Tre-lech) is a village and community in Carmarthenshire, in south-west Wales. Trelech is located some 10 miles north-west of Carmarthen and 6.5 miles south of Newcastle Emlyn, and in the parish of Tre-lech a'r Betws.

== Description ==
The population taken at the 2011 census was 745.

The community is bordered by the communities of: Cenarth; Cynwyl Elfed; Abernant; Meidrim; and Llanwinio, all being in Carmarthenshire; and by Clydau in Pembrokeshire.

The village is home to the Welsh-medium Ysgol Hafodwenog (Hafodwenog Community Primary School), which has around 60 pupils aged 4 to 11, and was opened in 1972 to serve the children of the surrounding settlements of Alma, Bryn Iwan, Cilrhedyn, Dinas, Gelliwen, Pandy, Penybont, and Talog, as well as those of Trelech itself.

Trelech has a community centre (in the building, across the road, which housed the modern school's predecessor) and a pub, the Tafarn Beca. However, given the area's very rural and lightly populated nature, the village no longer has a shop or post office. There is a children's play area, and the school also has a small soccer field.

== Governance ==
A Trelech electoral ward exists which covers the area. This ward stretches beyond the confines of Trelech community with a total population at the 2011 Census of 2,072.

== Notable people ==
- David Rees, (1801–1869), a reforming Welsh Congregationalist minister, also known as Y Cynhyrfwr
- Perceval Gibbon (1879–1926), an author, journalist, poet and short-story writer.
- David Nott OBE OStJ FRCS (born 1956) a Welsh consultant surgeon in London, he volunteers to work in disaster and war zones. He grew up with his grandparents in Trelech

== History ==
Trelech was one of the major cities of medieval Wales. In the 1230s, the de Clare family established it as a manufacturing town, producing iron and coal. By 1288, the town had 378 burgage plots. A raid in 1291, followed by the impact of the Black Death , destroyed much of the town. The remaining town was fully destroyed by Owain Glyndŵr in the early 1400s. Afterwards, the town became mostly abandoned, with the exception of a few people who helped restore the St. Nicholas parish.
