= St Clears Town Hall =

Municipal Building in St Clears, Wales

- Neuadd y Dref Sanclêr (Welsh)
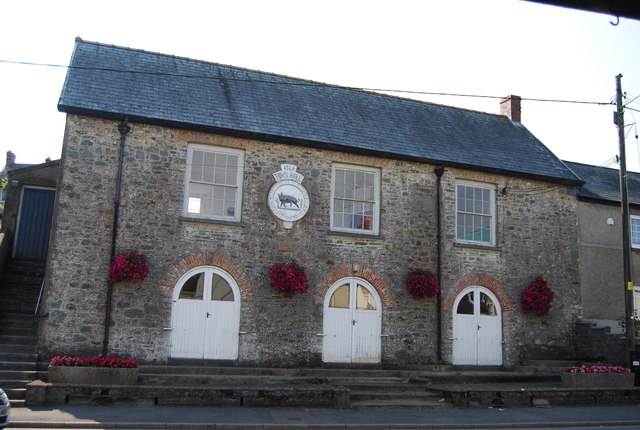
- St Clears Town Hall

- Shown in Carmarthenshire
- 51.8135°N 4.4962°W
- Location: High Street, St Clears

History
- Built: 1848

Site notes
- Architect: John Rogers
- Architectural style: Vernacular style

Listed Building – Grade II
- Official name: The Town Hall
- Designated: 11 June 2001
- Reference no.: 25481

St Clears Town Hall (Welsh: Neuadd y Dref Sanclêr) is a municipal building in the High Street, St Clears, Carmarthenshire, Wales. The structure, which is currently disused, is a Grade II listed building.

== History ==
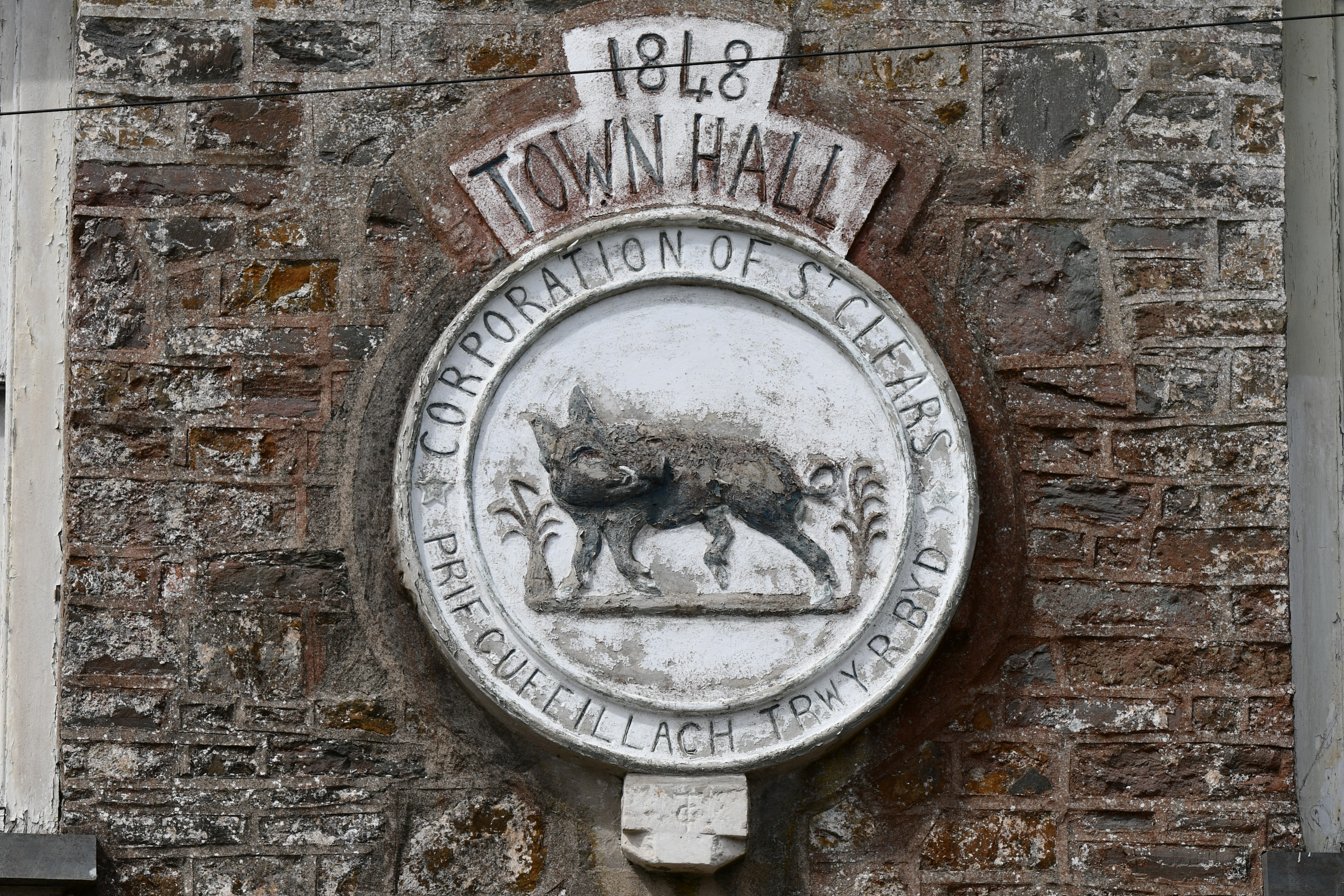
Plaque on the main frontage

The building was originally commissioned a storehouse for a residential building opposite, Cross House. The site selected was on the west side of the High Street opposite to the lychgate of the Priory Church of St Mary Magdalene. It was designed in the vernacular style, built in rubble masonry and was completed in the early 19th century.

The storehouse was acquired by the St Clears Corporation for £130 and converted into a municipal building at a cost of £119 at the corporation's expense in 1848. The architect was John Rogers, the son of a local entrepreneur, James Rogers. The design involved a broadly symmetrical main frontage of three bays facing onto the High Street. The ground floor was arcaded, with three round headed openings headed by red brick voussoirs, so that markets could be held. It was fenestrated by three sash windows on the first floor. A coped external staircase, leading up to a porch on the first floor, was erected at the south end of the building. A circular plaque was placed between the first two windows: it depicted a legendary wild boar, known as the Twrch Trwyth, around which was inscribed the name of the owner of the building, in English and in Welsh, "Corporation of St. Clears. Prif Cufeillach Trwy'r Byd". Internally, the principal rooms were a market hall on the ground floor and an assembly room on the first floor.

In the 19th century, the building was also used for public meetings and for religious services held on behalf of the Church of Jesus Christ of Latter-day Saints. The borough council, which was managed by a court leet that had held its meetings in the town hall, was abolished under the Municipal Corporations Act 1883. The assets of the corporation, including the town hall, were transferred to a newly established body, the St Clears Town Trust, in around 1890.

The building was used as a children's classroom from the 1960s and then as a carpenter's workshop in the early 21st century. However, it is currently disused and the condition of the fabric of the building is deteriorating.
