= Land of Thirst =

South African television drama

- Release dates: 2008
- Country: South Africa

Land of Thirst is a South African television drama written and directed by Meg Rickards, who is based in Cape Town. The drama was broadcast on SABC2 in Jan/Feb 2008 in three segments and was produced by Durban-based Vuleka Productions. It is also available as a 94-minute film which is slightly different in its opening style.

The drama was adapted from a novel published nearly a century ago, Margaret Harding, by Perceval Gibbon, who came to South Africa as a Boer War journalist and later wrote this work.

A historical romance set in the Karoo in 1913, Land of Thirst is a love story about two people far ahead of their time, caught in the cross-currents of emergent South Africa. Margaret leaves England and moves to Africa for the treatment of her tuberculosis in the dry air of the Karoo, while Khanyiso goes there to search for his African roots. Romance flourishes for them in this “land of thirst” but the drama comes with pressure on that romance.

Margaret and Khanyiso independently leave England and travel to South Africa. The consumptive Margaret seeks treatment at a sanatorium. Khanyiso is the son of a Xhosa chief executed by the British twenty years earlier who was taken to London as a child, raised as an English gentleman and given a medical training. He is returning home to unearth what happened to his father – and to serve his people as a doctor.

Margaret and Khanyiso both feel alienated in the deeply parochial society of the Karoo. The decrepit sanatorium where Margaret is being treated is run by an alcoholic doctor and his mean-spirited wife, while Khanyiso must stay in a brothel after being shunned by the racist proprietors of every guesthouse in town. Khanyiso and Margaret meet through a shy teenager named Paul – a naïve farm boy who latches onto both of them as his only friends. Khanyiso and Margaret find in each other refuge from the harsh world of the Karoo, and fall passionately in love. But their love puts both their lives at risk.

== Cast ==
- Hlomla Dandala as Khanyiso Phalo
- Lucy Wylde as Margaret Harding
- Ian Roberts as Christiaan Di Preez
- Stephen Jennings as Doctor Jakes
- Mrs Jakes as Terri Norton
- Susan Danford as Vivie du Preez
- Pierre Malherbe as Ford
