= St Clears Castle =

Castle in St Clears, Carmarthenshire

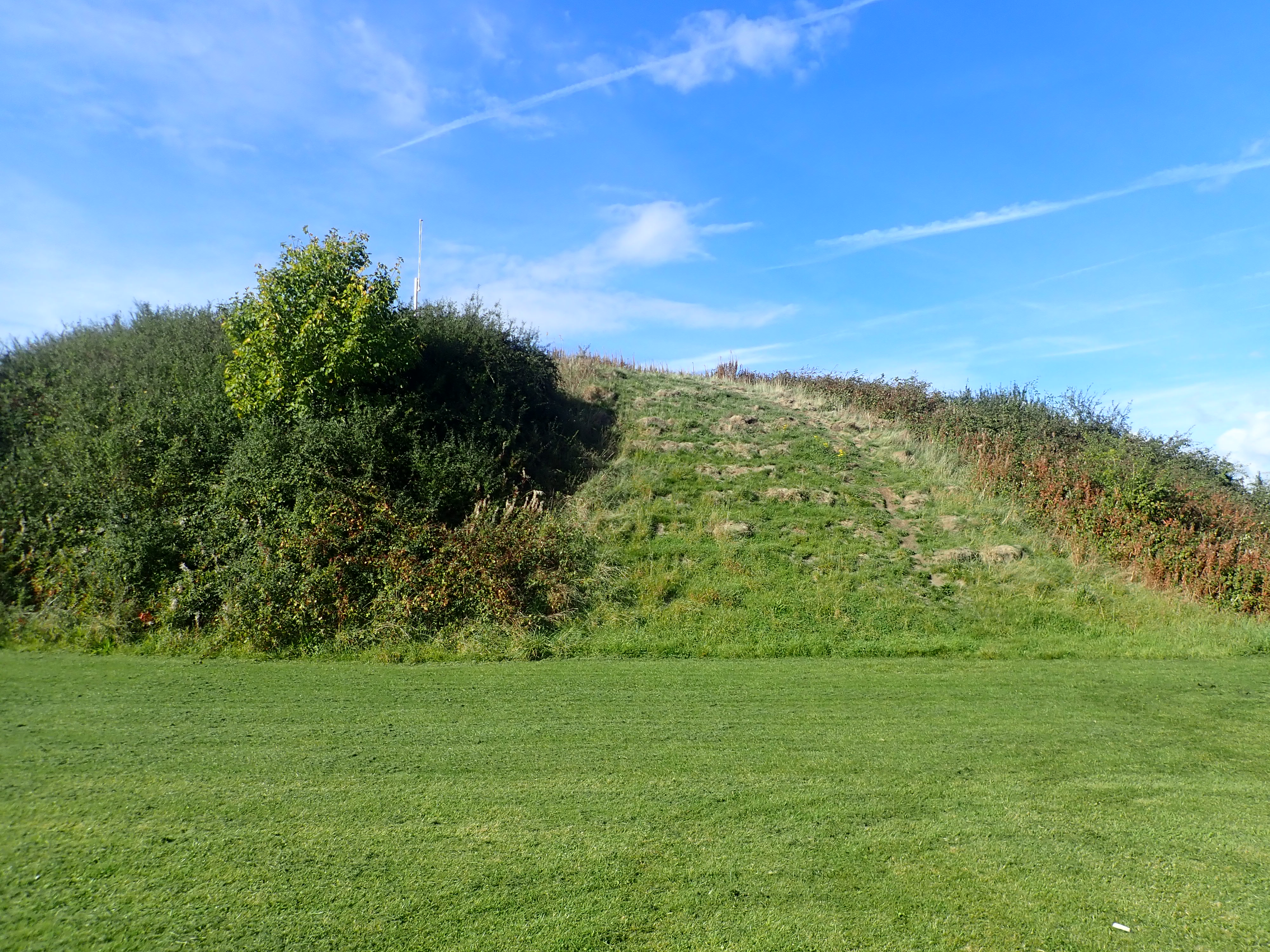
- The remains of St Clears Castle in 2022
- Alternative names: Banc y Beili, Ystrad Cyngen, Rhyd Y Gors, St Clare

General information
- Location: St Clears, Carmarthenshire, South Wales
- Coordinates: 51.81095°N 4.49515°W
- Year built: Late 11th century

Scheduled monument
- Official name: St Clears Mound and Bailey Castle
- Designated: 09 November 1950
- Reference no.: CM095

St Clears Castle, also known as Banc y Beili, is a castle ruin in Carmarthenshire, Wales. It is a scheduled monument on the outskirts of St Clears.

== History ==
The castle was built in the late 11th century during the Norman conquest of Wales, with a Cluniac priory established at St Clears around 1100. It was likely known as Ystrad Cyngen in its early history, a castle captured in 1153 by Rhys ap Gruffydd, the Welsh prince of Deheubarth.

Giraldus Cambrensis names St Clears Castle as the home of 12 English archers who murdered a young Welshman in 1188. The following year, the castle was recaptured by Rhys ap Gruffydd, who gave it to his son Hywel Sais.

In 1195, the castle was captured by the Anglo-Norman Baron William de Braose.

During his campaign in South Wales, Llywelyn ap Iorwerth, the Prince of Gwynedd, captured the castle in 1215 and destroyed it.

During the Anglo-Welsh War, William Marshal recaptured the castle for the English in 1223. It then remained in English hands until the 14th century, when it slowly fell into ruin.

In 1405, it was besieged and captured by the Welsh rebel Owain Glyndŵr, along with Carmarthen Castle, but the following year the rebels suffered a defeat against the English at St Clears, which forced them to abandon the castle. After that, the castle was abandoned and fell into ruin.

== Site ==
The castle was built as a motte-and-bailey mediaeval-era military stronghold at the confluence of the Taf and Cynin rivers, which was probably the limit for navigable water at the time. The motte lies to the north of the former castle, while the large rectangular bailey extends 50 metres to the south. Originally a timber tower, it was probably replaced by a masonry keep. The bailey would have included a Great Hall, kitchens, a chapel, stables and workshop, as well as a gate by the river with a turret over it. In later years, lime kilns were built near the ramparts.

Only the motte and the area of the bailey remain of the castle. The earthen motte measures 37–38 by 46–48 meters and is 8–12.2 meters high; the area at its summit measures 10 by 15–20 meters. The bailey measures 70–75 by 45–85 meters. There was a ditch around the motte and a bank and ditch around the bailey, but these have been rendered inconspicuous by modern soil movement.

The site was designated as a scheduled monument on 9 November 1950. It is located about 200 m south of the parish church in the centre of St Clears and surrounded by residential buildings.
