= Llangynin =

Village and community in Carmarthenshire, Wales

Coordinates: 51°51′N 4°33′W

- Village and community
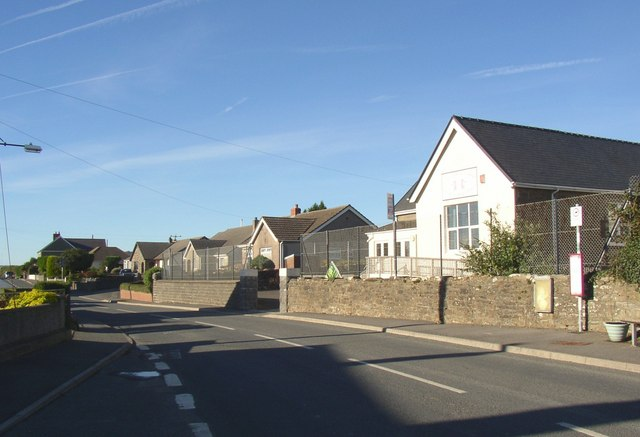
- Llangynin school

- Location within Carmarthenshire
- Principal area: Carmarthenshire
- Country: Wales
- Sovereign state: United Kingdom
- Police: Dyfed-Powys
- Fire: Mid and West Wales
- Ambulance: Welsh
- List of places UK Wales Carmarthenshire Map of the community

Llangynin (Welsh for 'the church of St. Cynin') is a village and community located in Carmarthenshire, Wales. The population of the community taken at the 2011 census was 284.

St Cynin's church is a grade II* listed building which stands some 2 km south of the centre of the village.

The community is bordered by the communities of: Llanwinio; Meidrim; St Clears; and Llanboidy, all being in Carmarthenshire.
