= Newchurch and Merthyr =

Community in Carmarthenshire, Wales

Coordinates: 51.894°N 4.351°W

- Community
- Location within Carmarthenshire
- Principal area: Carmarthenshire
- Country: Wales
- Sovereign state: United Kingdom
- Police: Dyfed-Powys
- Fire: Mid and West Wales
- Ambulance: Welsh
- List of places UK Wales Carmarthenshire Map of the community

Newchurch and Merthyr (Welsh: Llannewydd a Merthyr) is a community located in Carmarthenshire, Wales including the villages of Newchurch (Welsh: Llannewydd) and Merthyr. The community population at the 2011 census was 676.

The community is bordered by the communities of: Cynwyl Elfed; Bronwydd; Carmarthen; Llangynog; St Clears; Meidrim; and Abernant, all being in Carmarthenshire.

In May 2022 the community was transferred from the Cynwyl Elfed electoral ward to the county ward of Trelech. The Trellech ward elects one councillor to Carmarthenshire County Council.
