= Perceval Gibbon =

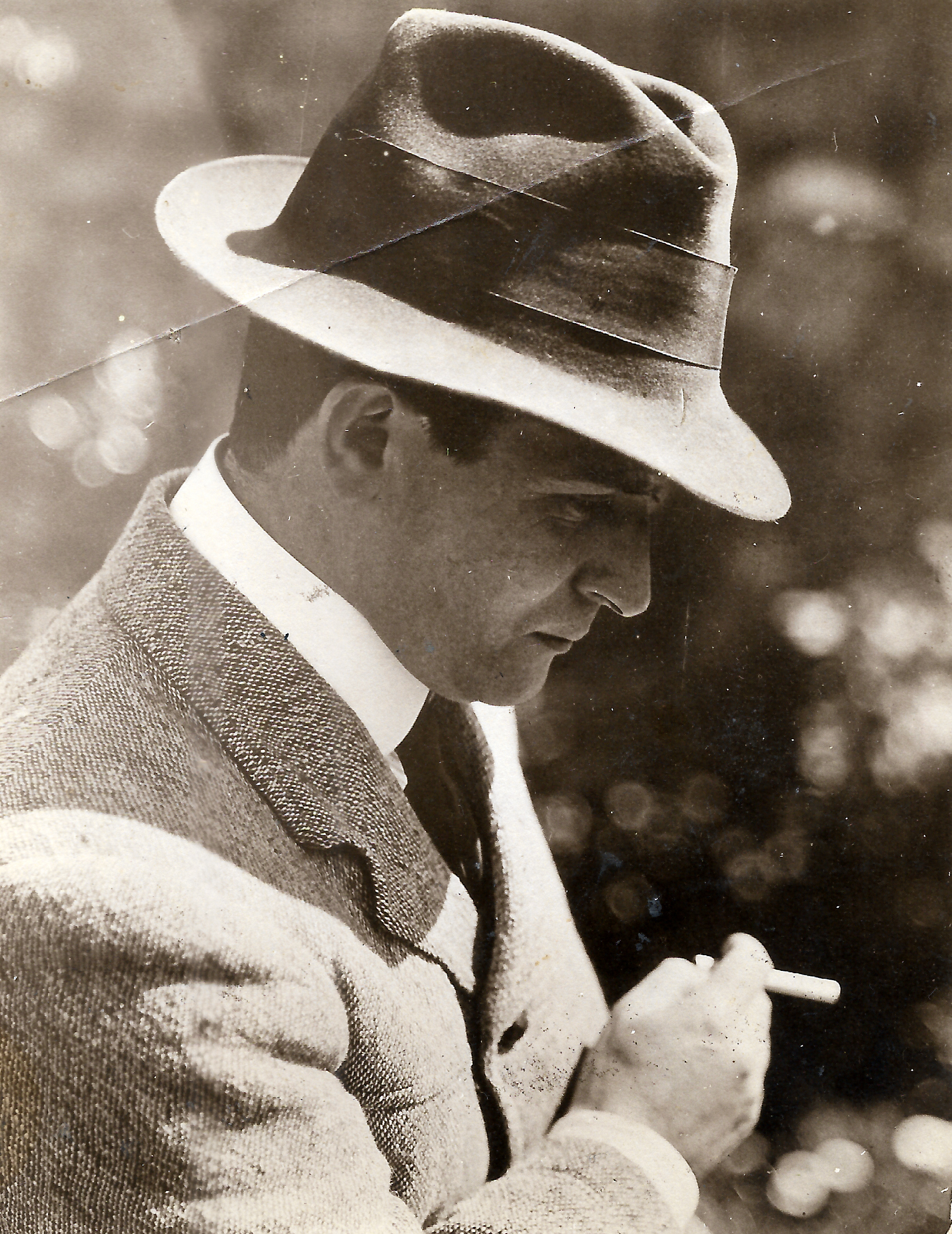
Perceval Gibbon, 1913

Perceval Gibbon (4 November 1879 – 30 May 1926) was an author and journalist, serving for the Rand Daily Mail in South Africa, as well as for other publications. Gibbon had travelled to South Africa in 1898, moved to the war front and became the representative of a syndicate of colonial newspapers at the outbreak of the Anglo-Boer War. He is best remembered for his short stories, which often contained an ironic twist at the end. Gibbon's influence on the work of later South African authors has been acknowledged. For instance, the fictional narrator of Vrouw Grobelaar's Leading Cases (1905) is said to be a forerunner of Herman Charles Bosman's character Oom Schalk Lourens.

== Early life ==
Gibbon was born in Trelech, Carmarthenshire, Wales, and was educated in the Moravian School, in Königsfeld, Baden, Germany.

During World War I he was a war correspondent with the Italian Army from 1917 to 1918. From 1918–1919, Perceval Gibbon was a Major in the British Royal Marines. After leaving school at Königsfeld, Gibbon joined the Merchant Navy as a cadet under sail, travelling in Europe, Africa, and the Americas. He writes with authority about the sea, ships and sailing and continued to retain close associations with the Navy throughout his writing life. His first acquaintance with the Royal Navy was as a young journalist reporting on courts-martial held aboard HMS Victory at Portsmouth. During the First World War he was given a commission as a Major in the Royal Marine Artillery, employed as a sort of official eyewitness with the Navy. One outcome of this period was his authorship of The triumph of the Royal Navy (1919).

== Career and adult life ==
Perceval Gibbon was a friend of the writer Joseph Conrad, and dedicated his novel Flower o' the Peach (1911) to Joseph Conrad and Jessie Conrad. Conrad dedicated his novel Victory (1915) to Perceval and Maisie Gibbon.

Gibbon's early works were influenced by his extensive travels throughout Europe, America, and Africa.

In 2007 the work Margaret Harding was adapted into a screenplay by Meg Rickards who directed the mini-series and the made-for-TV feature film for the South African Broadcasting Corporation (SABC), under the title Land of Thirst.

== Selected works ==
- African Items, 1903 (verse)
- Souls in Bondage, 1904 (novel)
- Salvator, 1905 (novel)
- Vrouw Grobelaar's Leading Cases, 1905 (stories)
- Flower o' the Peach, 1911 (novel). (Published in Britain by Methuen, London under the title Margaret Harding).
- The Adventures of Miss Gregory, 1911 (stories)
- Margaret Harding, 1911 (novel), (published in the US by The Century Co, New York under the title Flower o' the Peach). adapted into television series, Land of Thirst in 2008.
- The Triumph of the Royal Navy: Official Record of the Surrender of the German Fleet, 1918, Hodder & Stoughton, 48pp.
- The Second Class Passenger, 1913 (stories) at Project Gutenberg
- The Dark Places, 1926 (stories)
