= River Cywyn =

River in Carmarthenshire, Wales

Coordinates: 51.79264°N 4.45307°W

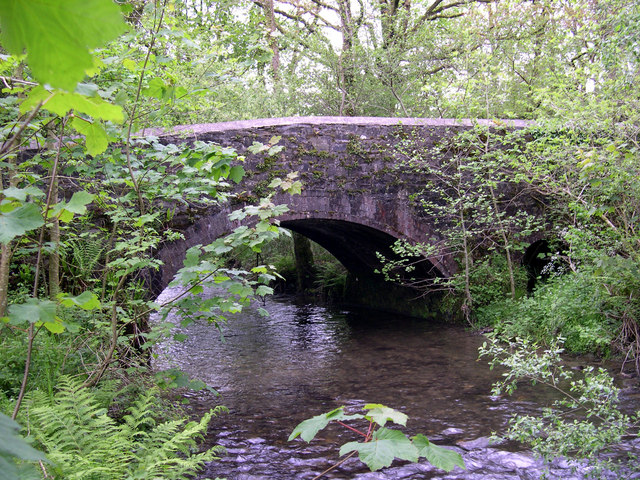
Bridge over the Cywyn near Blaen-y-coed

The River Cywyn (Welsh: Afon Cywyn) is a river that flows through Carmarthenshire, south Wales. It rises some seven miles west-north-west of Carmarthen and flows in a southerly direction to join the River Tâf near its estuary at St Clears.
