= Jacob Thomas (VC) =

Welsh military official

- Born: February 1833; Llanwinio, Carmarthenshire
- Died: 3 March 1911 (aged 78); Hooghly, British India
- Burial place: Bandel Churchyard, Hooghly
- Military career
- Allegiance: United Kingdom
- Branch: Bengal Army
- Rank: Quartermaster-Sergeant
- Units: Bengal Artillery
- Conflicts: Indian Mutiny
- Awards: Victoria Cross

Jacob Thomas VC (February 1833 – 3 March 1911) was a Welsh recipient of the Victoria Cross, the highest and most prestigious award for gallantry in the face of the enemy that can be awarded to British and Commonwealth forces.

== Details ==
Thomas was about 24 years old, and a bombardier in the Bengal Artillery, Bengal Army during the Indian Mutiny when the following deed took place on 27 September 1857 at the Siege of Lucknow, British India for which he was awarded the VC:

For distinguished gallantry at Lucknow on the 27th September, 1857, in having brought off on his back, under a heavy fire, under circumstances of considerable difficulty, a wounded soldier of the Madras Fusiliers, when the party to which he was attached was returning to the Residency from a sortie, whereby he saved him from falling into the hands of the enemy.

== Further information ==
He later achieved the rank of quartermaster-sergeant. He was born in Llanwinio near Carmarthen and died near Darjeeling aged 77.

== The medal ==
His Victoria Cross is displayed at the Royal Artillery Museum, Woolwich, England.
