= Cynwyl Elfed (electoral ward) =

Electoral ward in Carmarthenshire, Wales

Cynwyl Elfed is an electoral ward, representing the communities of Bronwydd, Cynwyl Elfed and Llanpumpsaint, Carmarthenshire, Wales.

== Profile ==
In 2014, the Cynwyl Elfed electoral ward had an electorate of 2,550. The total population was 2,985, of whom 66.0% were born in Wales. The 2011 census indicated that 54.3% of the population were able to speak Welsh.

A 2019 boundary review by the Local Government Boundary Commission for Wales recommended the Newchurch and Merthyr community be removed from Cynwyl Elfed and added to the neighbouring Trelech ward. The change was to take effect from the May 2022 local elections.

== Current Representation ==
Cynwyl Elfed is a single-member ward for the purposes of Carmarthenshire County Council elections. Between 2012 and 2022 it was represented by Independent councillor Irfon Jones. Since 2022 Bryan Davies from Plaid Cymru has represented the ward.
