= Meidrim =

Village and community in Carmarthenshire, Wales

- Village and community
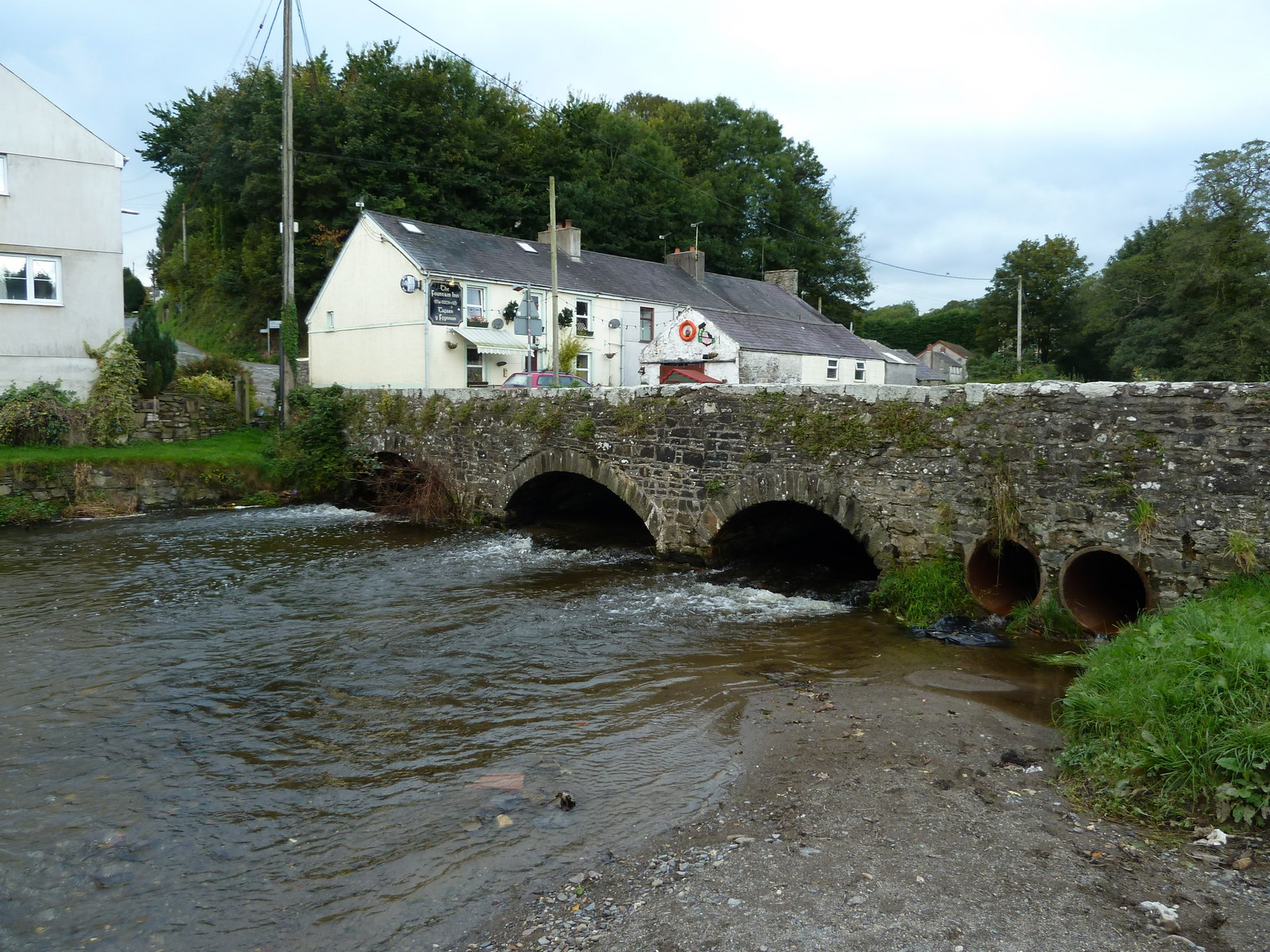
- The bridge crossing Afon Dewi Fawr, which runs through the centre of Meidrim

- Location within Carmarthenshire
- Population: 582
- OS grid reference: SN290209
  - Cardiff: 76 mi (122 km)
- Community: Meidrim
- Principal area: Carmarthenshire
- Preserved county: Dyfed
- Country: Wales
- Sovereign state: United Kingdom
- Post town: CARMARTHEN
- Postcode district: SA33
- Dialling code: 01994
- Police: Dyfed-Powys
- Fire: Mid and West Wales
- Ambulance: Welsh
- UK Parliament: Caerfyrddin
- Senedd Cymru – Welsh Parliament: Carmarthen West and South Pembrokeshire
- List of places UK Wales Carmarthenshire 51.860°N 4.485°W Map of the community

Meidrim is a village and community some 8 miles (13 km) west of Carmarthen and 3.3 miles (5.3 km) north of St Clears in Carmarthenshire, Wales. Meidrim (formerly also spelled 'Mydrim') and its twin village of Drefach are situated either side of the Afon Dewi Fawr at the point where this small river is crossed by the B4298 road and meets with the B4299 road.

Meidrim has a parish church, a Nonconformist chapel, a pub, a primary school, a village green or common and a park. It also boasts a number of self-catering cottages in the surrounding area making it popular for tourists visiting Pembrokeshire National Park and the Brecon Beacons as well as a number of local walks.

The name was first attested in 1612 as 'Midrim' (modern Welsh 'Meidrim') in a volume entitled 'Llyfr Plygain 1612'. As explained by the Welsh scholar Ifor Williams in his treatise on Welsh place-names (Enwau Lleoedd, 1945), it is a compound name derived from 'mei' (half, middle, cf. Latin 'medius') and the mutated form of the noun 'trum' (slope, ridge, peak, range of hills etc., Old Irish 'druimm'; cf. the Cornish place-name 'Pendrim').

The community is bordered by the communities of: Trelech; Abernant; Newchurch and Merthyr; St Clears; Llangynin; and Llanwinio, all being in Carmarthenshire.

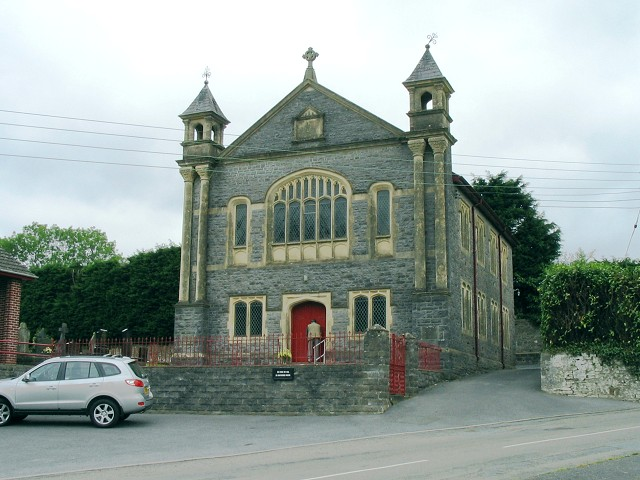
Chapel in Meidrim
