= St Clears =

Town in Carmarthenshire, Wales

St Clears: Welsh: Sanclêr
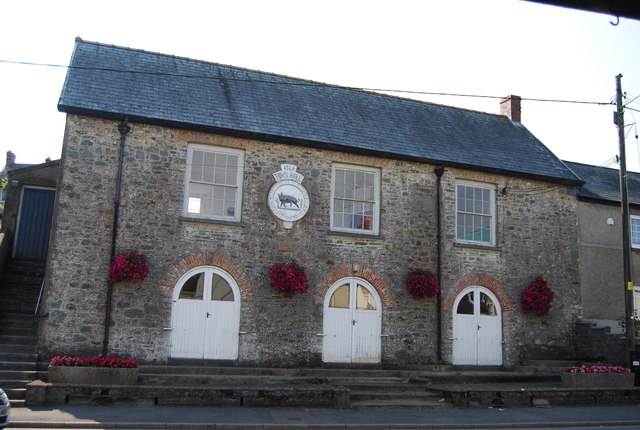
- St Clears Town Hall

- Location within Carmarthenshire
- Population: 3,216 (2021 census)
- OS grid reference: SN275165
- Community: St Clears
- Principal area: Carmarthenshire
- Preserved county: Dyfed
- Country: Wales
- Sovereign state: United Kingdom
- Post town: CARMARTHEN
- Postcode district: SA33
- Dialling code: 01994
- Police: Dyfed-Powys
- Fire: Mid and West Wales
- Ambulance: Welsh
- UK Parliament: Caerfyrddin
- Website: stclearstowncouncil.co.uk
- List of places UK Wales Carmarthenshire 51.82043°N 4.50424°W Map of the community

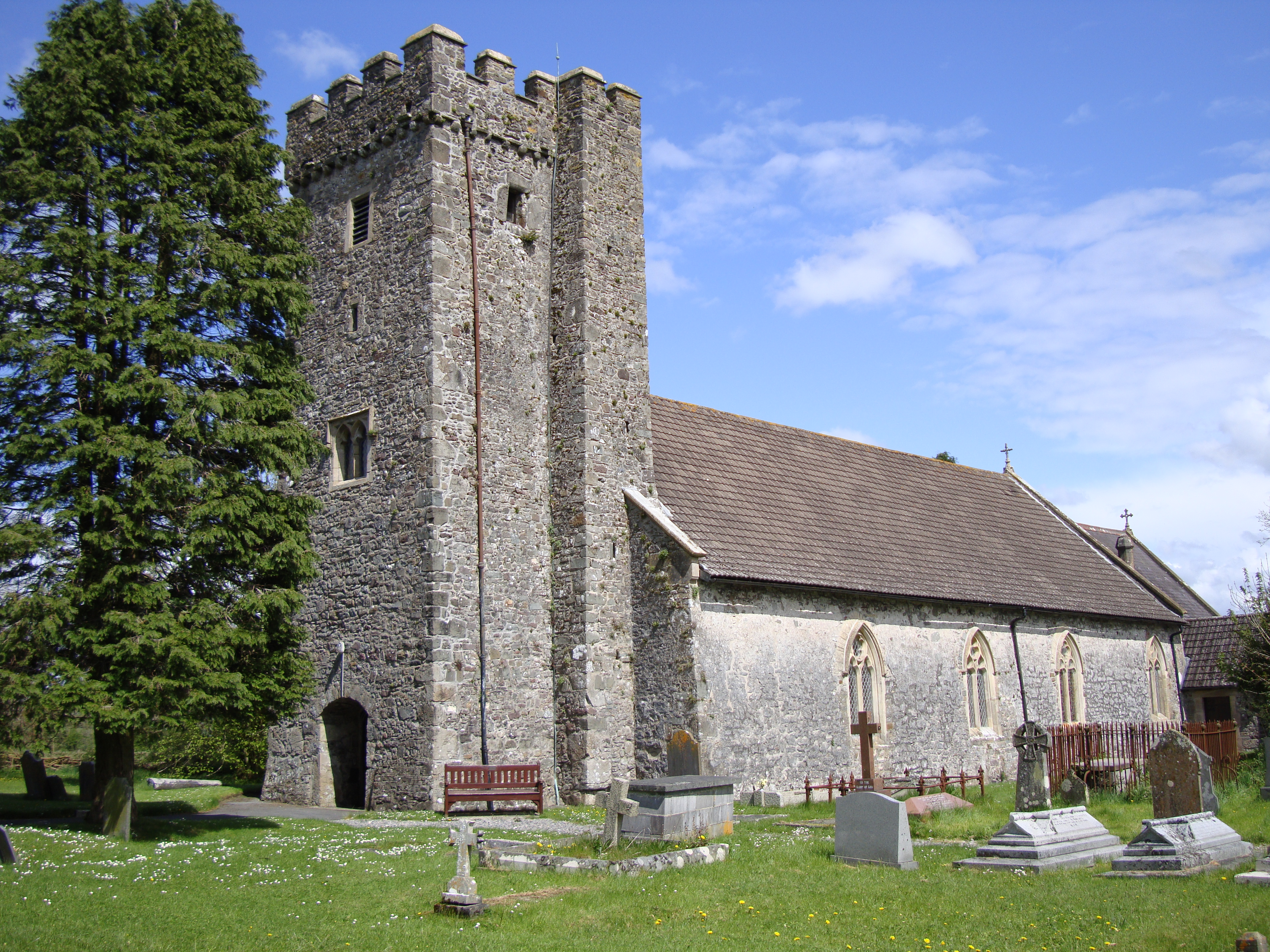
Priory Church of St Mary Magdalene

St Clears (/ˈklɛərz/ KLAIRZ; Welsh: Sanclêr) is a town on the River Taf and a community in Carmarthenshire, Wales. At the 2011 census, the population was 2,995. The community includes the small settlements of Bancyfelin, Backe and Pwlltrap. It is bordered by the Carmarthenshire towns and villages of Meidrim, Newchurch and Merthyr, Llangynog, Laugharne Township, Llanddowror, Eglwyscummin, Llanboidy and Llangynin.

== Toponymy ==
St Clare was either a church founder in the 5th/6th century (Clara), or an assembly of the Welsh bards (Clair – in Welsh).

== History ==
The Priory Church of St Mary Magdalene (Church in Wales) is a grade II* listed building and was founded c. 1100; a Cluniac priory of St Martin-des-Champs. It is considered to have the best surviving Norman stone carving in Carmarthenshire. The church was restored in 1853-55 and again in 1883–84. The stained glass is from c. 1929.

Around 1093 Norman newcomers under Bretel de St Clair, a knight from north‑Devon, threw up a timber‑and‑earth motte‑and‑bailey castle at St Clears, a simple fortress in which a wooden tower sat on a high artificial mound (the motte) and an adjoining yard (bailey) was ringed by a palisade. William de St Clair inherited the St Clair estates in England, yet by 1175 most of his Devon lands had passed to the Ashleigh (Ashley) family. Because neither family is later documented in Carmarthenshire, the next lord of St Clears is uncertain. The 1130 Pipe Roll, the earliest surviving annual Exchequer account, recording payments owed to and by the Crown under Henry I, lists several men responsible for supplying small contingents of knights to Carmarthen Castle. While many can be linked to specific lordships, none are recorded for St Clears, Ystlwyf, or Llansteffan. One explanation, advanced by historian Bob Joyce, is that these lords paid a local magnate, possibly Simon fitz Hugh, to meet their obligations. Simon, accountable for 12 knights and perhaps lord of Laugharne, Joyce states, may have been the son of Hugh de Rennes, who held a few south‑Devon manors in 1086 that later passed to the de Brians, though this has not been conclusively established by historians.

St Clears, a Marcher borough, grew around the fortress. The castle eventually surrendered to Owain Glyndŵr in 1405.

Nearby, Trefenty House became the home of a branch of the Perrot family in the 16th century, and it was here that the amateur astronomer Sir William Lower and a neighbour, John Protheroe, set up one of Britain's first telescopes in 1609, which they used to study the craters of the Moon and Halley's Comet.

Thomas Charles (1755–1814) was a Welsh Calvinistic Methodist clergyman of considerable importance in the history of modern Wales. He was born of humble parentage at Longmoor, in the parish of Llanfihangel Abercywyn, near St Clears.

In 1842, St Clears was an epicentre of the "Rebecca Riots". At least one local toll gate was destroyed there.

The building of the South Wales Railway in the 1850s was responsible for the decline of many of the small ports along the Bristol Channel coast, and St Clears was no exception. The railway passed about two miles north of the castle, and the new building at the north end of the High Street spread eastwards along Pentre Road, and then northwards to the station. Pentre Road is now the main commercial centre of St Clears and was formerly part of the A40 road until the bypass opened.

The town's cattle market was important until its closure, but the town still has a large agricultural cooperative store. The town has also hosted an oil distribution centre and milk processing plant. Now, smaller industrial units provide the main local employment.

Photographer and film-maker Stanley Phillips lived in St Clears and documented life in the town and the surrounding area (active 1910–1961). His work appeared in the News Chronicle, Daily Mirror, and Sunday Mirror, as well as local newspapers. His films include The Last March of Mr. Jonah Rees at St Clears (1930), which is in the collection of the National Library of Wales. He worked closely with Colonel William Buckley (whose work is also in the National Library of Wales) and E.V. Williams, both keen filmmakers. The permanent exhibition of Phillips' photographs and film at the Mezzanine Gallery in St. Clears includes photographs of the aviator Amy Johnson, World War I flying ace Wing Commander Ira Jones, and racing drivers Sir Malcolm Campbell and J. G. Parry-Thomas, who both attempted world land speed records at nearby Pendine Sands.

Neville Hughes (1945–2015) was born in St Clears. He was a British actor and later a successful businessman in the motor manufacturer sales and marketing sector.

== Governance ==
St Clears is also an electoral ward, electing councillors to Carmarthenshire County Council and St Clears Town Council. St Clears Town Hall, which is no longer used for civic purposes, is a grade II listed building.

== Railway ==
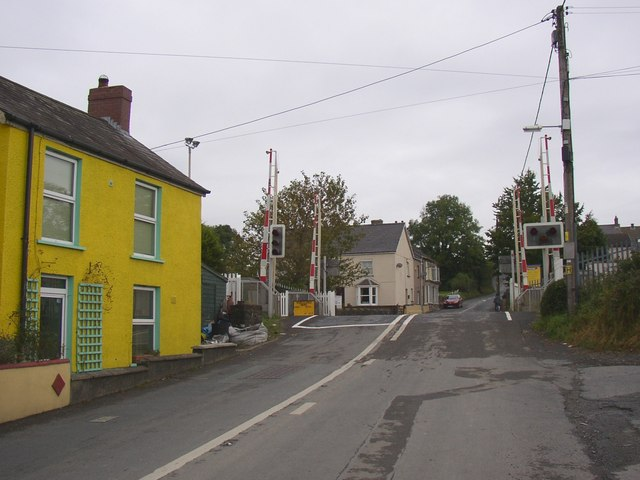
St Clears railway station was on the right

The original railway was constructed by the South Wales Railway. Although trains travel on the West Wales line through St Clears, they have not stopped since 1964. After a local campaign to persuade the Welsh Government and Network Rail to reopen St Clears railway station, funding was secured to do so by 2024.

== Amenities ==
The town has a large bilingual primary school, Ysgol Griffith Jones.

There are a variety of local shops including two prize-winning traditional butchers and two craft centres. There are several pubs.

The surrounding countryside is mainly rolling grassland consisting of moderate-sized fields with well-kept hedges. The main agricultural enterprise is dairying, but sheep and beef are very important as well. The soils are deep and productive and will grow good crops of potatoes and cereals, and the climate allows fruit growing as well. Although most of the land is farmed commercially the area is a haven for wildlife.

The highlight of the farming year is the St Clears YFC annual show which is held in May.

== Sport ==
St Clears AFC is an association football club playing in the Pembrokeshire League.
