= Talog, Carmarthenshire =

Village in Carmarthenshire, Wales

Coordinates: 51°54′05″N 4°25′38″W

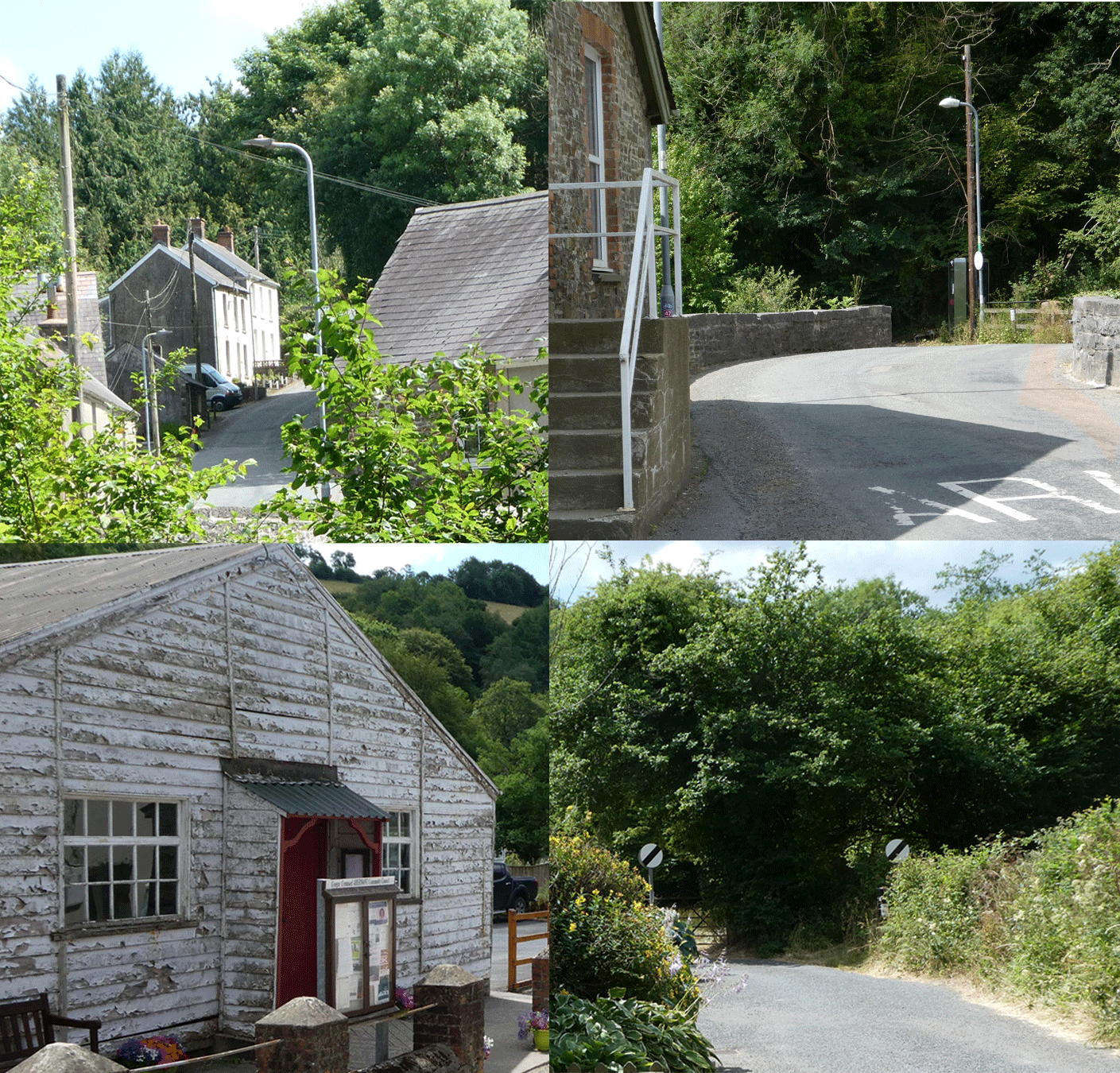
Some views of Talog

Talog is a small rural village in Carmarthenshire, Wales, located on the River Cywyn, about seven miles north-west of the town of Carmarthen. It is in the community of Abernant.

Talog was one of many west Wales villages involved in the Rebecca Riots of the early 19th century. A local miller, John Harries, was tried for his involvement in an ambush of the police and army pensioners at Talog, on 12 June 1843, after a reward of £300 had been offered for his capture. Sentenced along with him were two other local men, Thomas Thomas and Sam Brown.

The village store was originally established in 1836 by Thomas Thomas and incorporated a post office. The village is now served by a mobile Post Office which visits 2 days a week. Bethania Baptist Church was built in 1839. A First World War building, purchased from the War Department in Monmouth, was brought to the village and set up for use as a village hall in 1920.

Talog is the home of Jin Talog, a small gin distillery which won 3 Stars in the 2019 Great Taste awards, one of only four winners of the top mark. It was also nominated for a Golden fork award that year.
