= Llanwinio =

Village and community in Carmarthenshire, Wales

Coordinates: 51°55′N 4°32′W

- Village and community
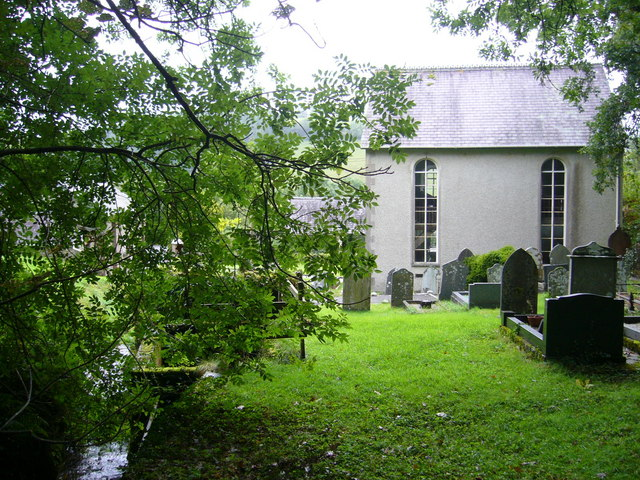
- Ainon Baptist Chapel, Gellywen. The baptismal tank for the chapel, just visible at bottom left, is fed directly from the stream which flows through the graveyard

- Location within Carmarthenshire
- Principal area: Carmarthenshire
- Country: Wales
- Sovereign state: United Kingdom
- Police: Dyfed-Powys
- Fire: Mid and West Wales
- Ambulance: Welsh
- List of places UK Wales Carmarthenshire Map of the community

Llanwinio is a village and community in Carmarthenshire, Wales, 2.7 miles (4.3 km) north of the hamlet of Gellywen.

The population recorded at the 2011 census was 448. The 2011 census showed 46.0% of the population could speak Welsh, a fall from 62.3% in 2001.

In 1844 Samuel Lewis's A Topographical Dictionary of Wales described Llanwinio as being divided into two sections – an Eastern Division and a Western Division, with a population of 1035: with a population of 422 in the Eastern and 613 in the Western Division.

The community is bordered by the communities of Trelech, Meidrim, Llangynin and Llanboidy, all in Carmarthenshire, and by Crymych and Clydau, both in Pembrokeshire.

Gellywen is home of Ainon Baptist Church, built in 1828 and re-built in 1880.

== Notable people ==
- Nathaniel Williams (1656 or 1657 – ca.1679), Baptist minister, author and hymn-writer, was born in Llanwinio.
- Jonathan Reynolds (bardic name Nathan Dyfed), author, poet and father of Llywarch Reynolds, was born in Llanwinio in April 1814.
- Jacob Thomas (VC) (1833–1911), Welsh recipient of the Victoria Cross following the Siege of Lucknow in 1857
- William Evans (1883–1968), bardic name Wil Ifan, poet and bard, was born in Cwmbach, near Llanwinio.
