= Abernant, Carmarthenshire =

Village and community in Carmarthenshire, Wales

Abernant
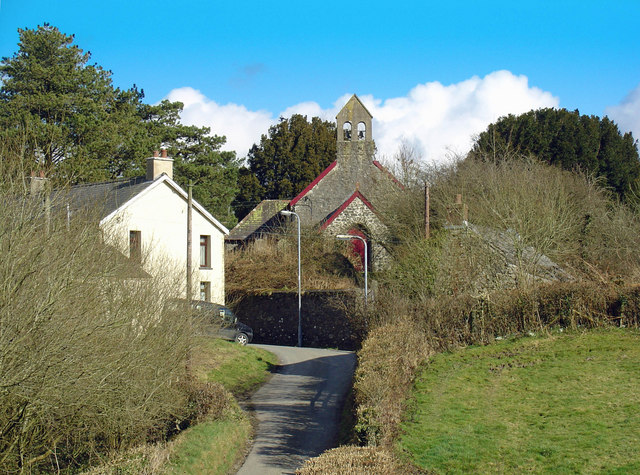

- Location within Carmarthenshire
- Population: 297
- Community: Abernant
- Principal area: Carmarthenshire
- Preserved county: Dyfed
- Country: Wales
- Sovereign state: United Kingdom
- Post town: Carmarthen
- Postcode district: SA33
- Police: Dyfed-Powys
- Fire: Mid and West Wales
- Ambulance: Welsh
- UK Parliament: Caerfyrddin
- Senedd Cymru – Welsh Parliament: Carmarthen West and South Pembrokeshire
- List of places UK Wales Carmarthenshire 51°52′53″N 4°25′00″W Map of the community

Abernant is a hamlet and community in Carmarthenshire, Wales. The population taken at the 2011 census was 297.

== Location ==
Abernant is a small hamlet located four miles north west of the traditional county town of Carmarthen.

The community is bordered by the communities of: Cynwyl Elfed; Newchurch and Merthyr; Meidrim; and Trelech, all being in Carmarthenshire.

== History & Amenities ==
It has a parish church and a small primary school.

Abernant has the oldest and vastest graveyard in Wales.

Abernant is situated near Talog, Bwlchnewydd and Cynwyl Elfed, all of which have more facilities than Abernant.

Abernant used to have a pub and a post office, but due to the ever-decreasing number of residents these no longer exist.
