= Prehistoric Wales =

History of Wales before AD 48

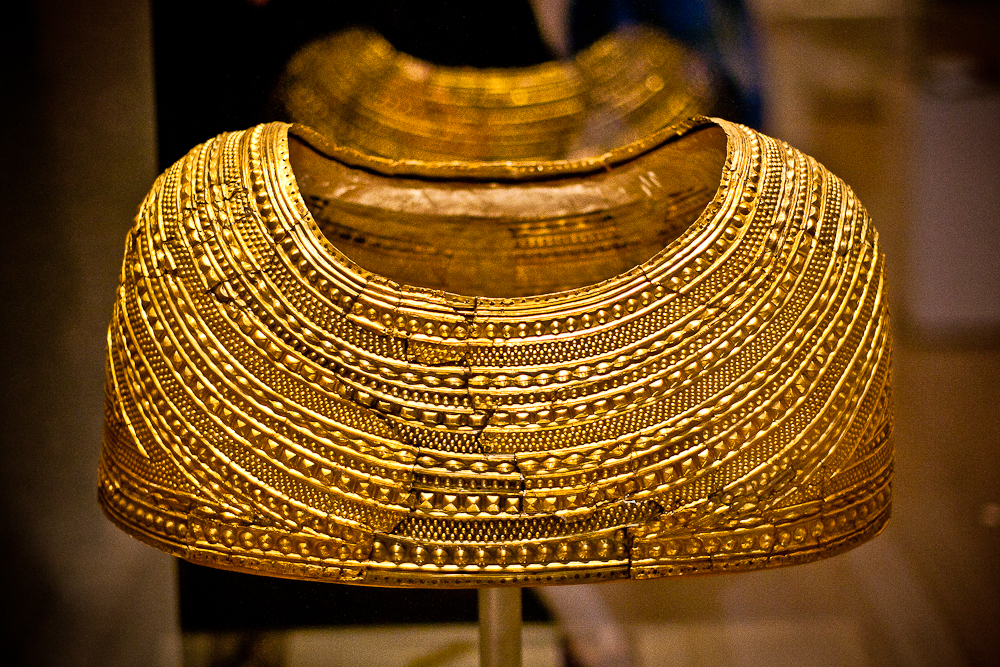
The Mold cape, a gold cape from Wales dating to 1900–1700 BC.

Prehistoric Wales in terms of human settlements covers the period from about 230,000 years ago, the date attributed to the earliest human remains found in what is now Wales, to the year AD 48 when the Roman army began a military campaign against one of the Welsh tribes. Traditionally, historians have believed that successive waves of immigrants brought different cultures into the area, largely replacing the previous inhabitants, with the last wave of immigrants being the Celts. However, studies of population genetics now suggest that this may not be true, and that immigration was on a smaller scale.

== Palaeolithic ==
The earliest known human remains discovered in modern-day Wales date from 230,000 years ago. An early Neanderthal upper jaw fragment containing two teeth, whose owner probably lived during an interglacial period in the Lower Palaeolithic, was found in a cave in the River Elwy valley, at the Bontnewydd Palaeolithic site, near St Asaph (Welsh: Llanelwy), Denbighshire. Excavations of the site between 1978 and 1995 revealed a further 17 teeth belonging to five individuals, a total of seven hand axes and some animal bones, some of which show signs of butchery. This site is the most north-westerly in Eurasia at which the remains of early hominids have been found, and is considered to be of international importance. Late Neanderthal hand axes were also found at Coygan Cave, Carmarthenshire and have been dated to between 60,000 and 35,000 years old.

The Paviland limestone caves of the Gower Peninsula in south Wales are by far the richest source of Aurignacian material in Britain, including burins and scrapers dated to about 28,500 years ago. The first remains of modern humans, Homo sapiens sapiens, to be found in Wales was the famous Red Lady of Paviland, discovered in the 1820s. This was a human skeleton dyed in red ochre discovered in 1823 in one of the Paviland caves in Gower. Despite the name, the skeleton is actually that of a young man who lived about 33,000-34,000 years ago, coincident with a warmer period at the end of the Upper Paleolithic Period (Old Stone Age). He is considered to be the oldest known ceremonial burial in Western Europe. The skeleton was found along with fragments of small cylindrical ivory rods, fragments of ivory bracelets and seashells. Some will call this finding the "Goat's Hole".

Settlement in Wales was apparently intermittent, as periods of cooling and warming led to the ice sheets advancing and retreating. Wales appears to have been abandoned from about 21,000 years ago until after 13,000 years ago, with a burial found at Kendrick's Cave on the Great Orme dating to about 12,000 years ago.

== Mesolithic ==
Following the last ice age, Wales became roughly the shape it is today by about 7000 BC and was inhabited by Mesolithic hunter-gatherers. Wales has many sites where Mesolithic material has been found, but securely stratified material is rare. The earliest dated Mesolithic site in Wales is Nab Head, Pembrokeshire, around 9,200 years ago. Many of the sites from this period are coastal, although 9,000 years ago they would have been some distance inland from the sea. There is a particular concentration in Pembrokeshire, but there are also a good number of upland sites, most apparently seasonal hunting locations, for example around Llyn Brenig. There is evidence of arrows and the use of simplistic tools in the Llŷn Peninsula. Some decorated pebbles found at Rhuddlan represent the earliest art found in Wales.

Anglesey's permanent settlement has a history beginning c. 9,000 years ago during the Mesolithic (European) period at the Aberffraw bay, Trwyn Du (Welsh: Black nose) excavated site. Millennia later, around 2,000 BC was when a Bronze Age kerb cairn (bowl barrow) was built covering the original Trwyn Du artifact deposit of 7,000 thousand Mesolithic flint tools and 2 axes.

== Neolithic ==
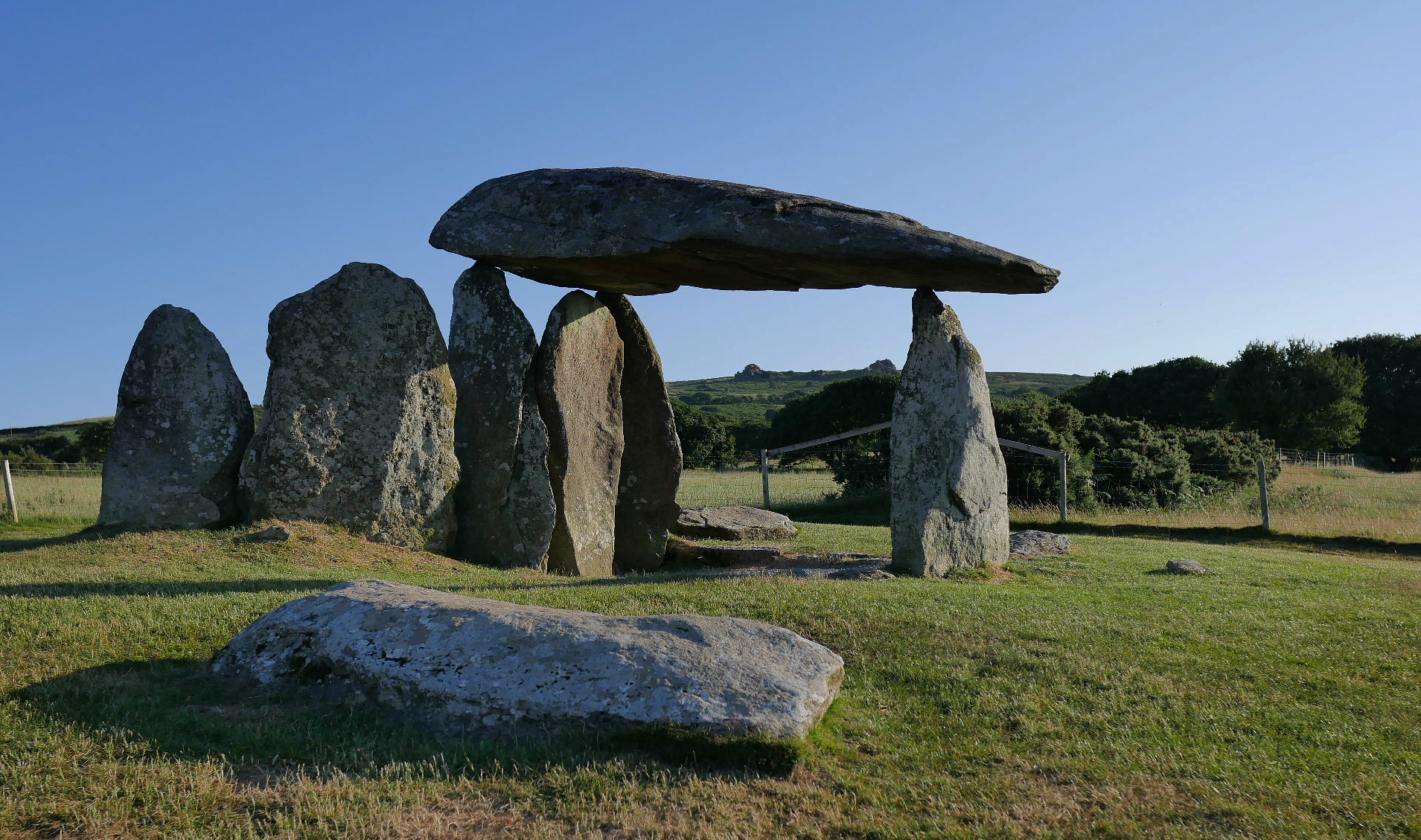
Pentre Ifan

The earliest farming communities are now believed to date from about 4000 BC, marking the beginning of the Neolithic period. Pollen evidence indicates the clearing of forests on an increasing scale during this period. The Neolithic saw the construction of many chambered tombs, the most notable including Bryn Celli Ddu and Barclodiad y Gawres on Anglesey. Also on the isle is one of the earliest settlements in Wales (potentially Wales' first village). The wooden long houses near Llanfaethlu is the remains of a Neolithic village dated to 4,000 BC. Flint tools were also found at the site.

Three main types of megalithic tomb are found in Wales, the Severn-Cotswold type in the south-east, the Portal dolmen type and the Passage graves which are characteristic of the Irish Sea area and the Atlantic façade of Europe and Morocco. Megalithic tombs are most common in the western lowlands. There is evidence of close cultural links with Ireland, particularly in the Early Neolithic period.

A number of houses from the Neolithic period have also been found in Wales, most notably the settlement at Clegyr Boia near St David's in Pembrokeshire. Many artefacts have also been found, particularly polished stone axeheads. There were a number of "factories" in Wales producing these axeheads, the largest being the Graig Lwyd factory at Penmaenmawr on the north coast which exported its products as far afield as Yorkshire and the English midlands. Pottery finds also indicate a relationship with Ireland.

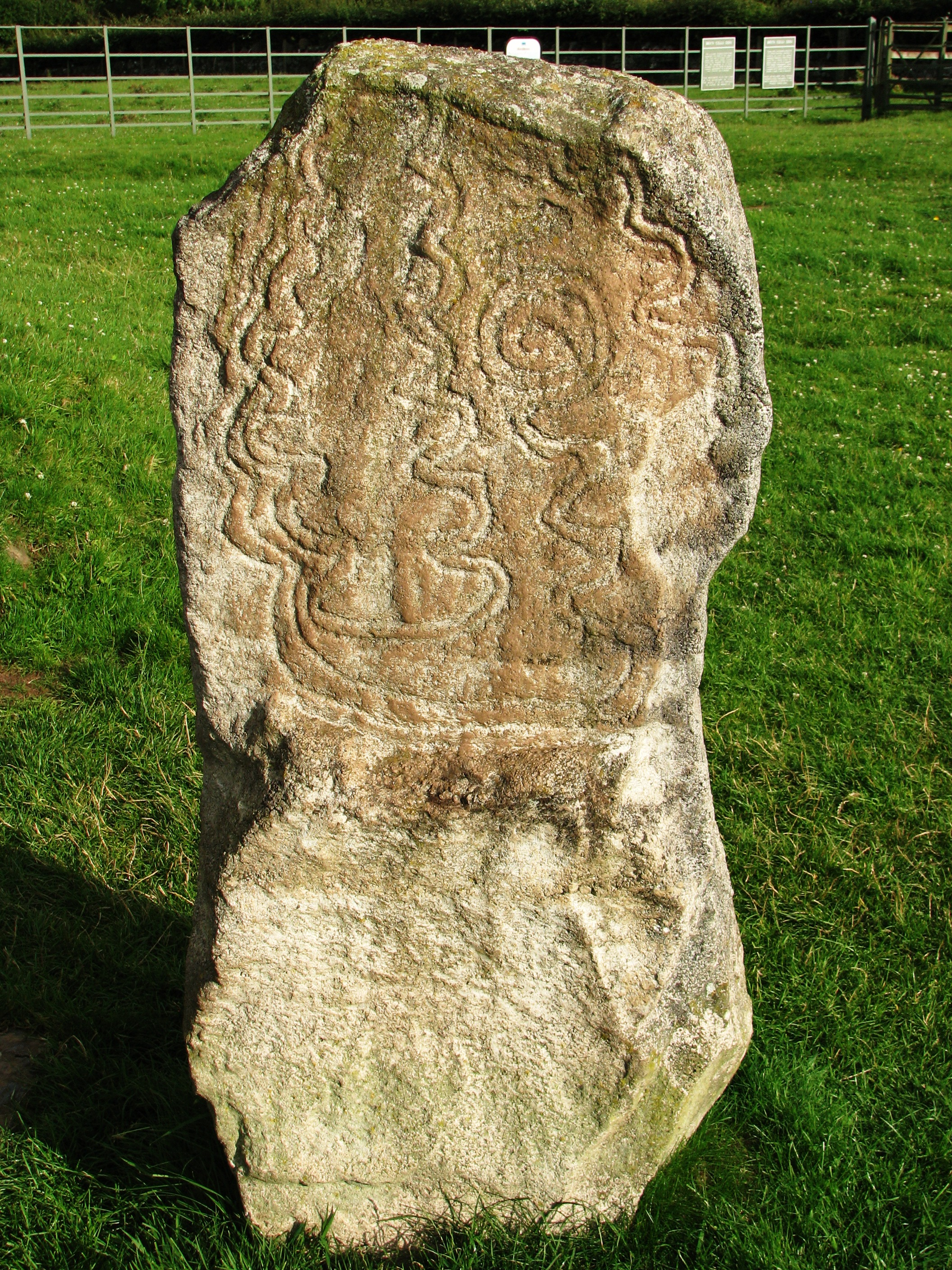
Bryn Celli Ddu 'Pattern Stone' (replica)

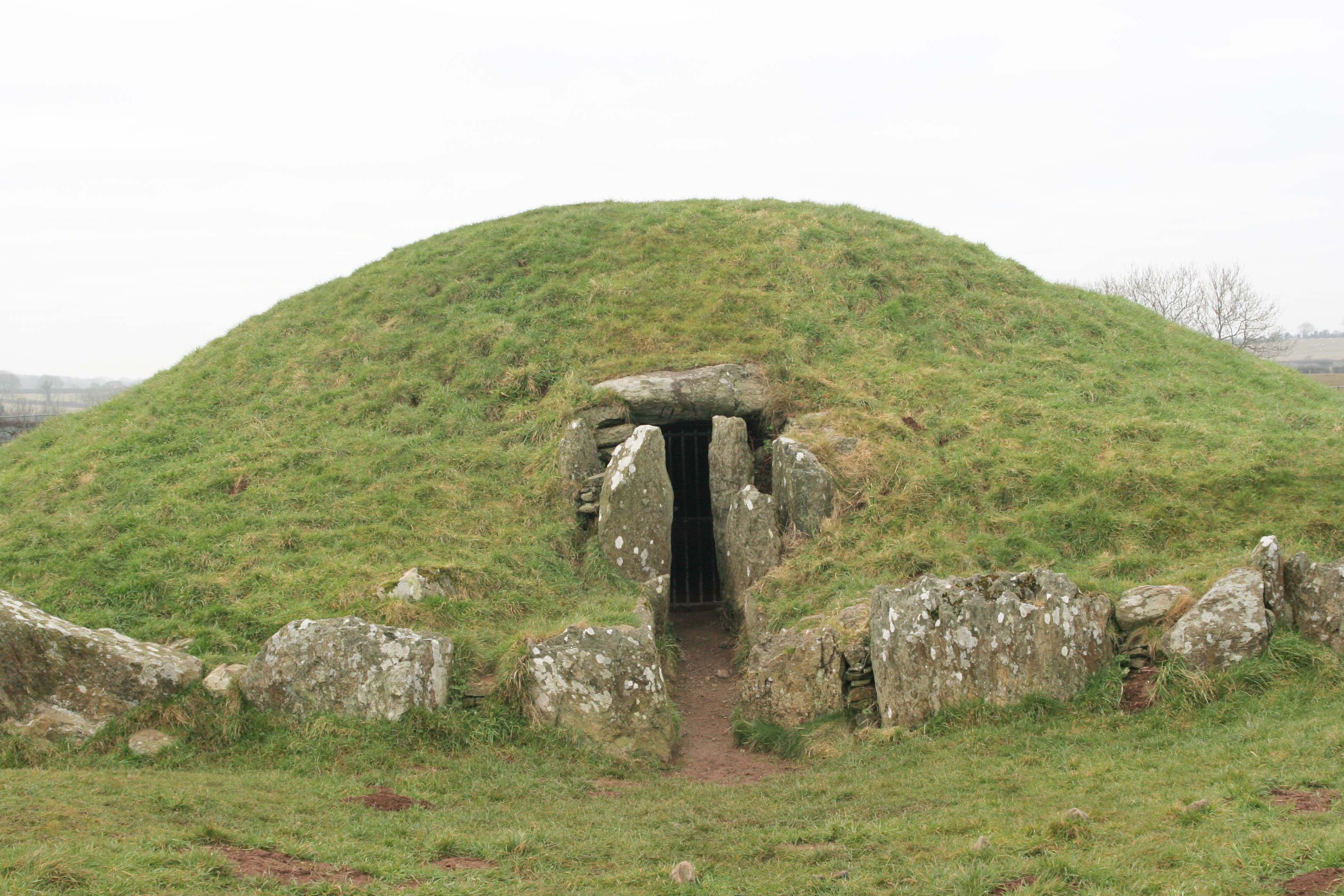
Bryn Celli Ddu, a late Neolithic chambered tomb on Anglesey.

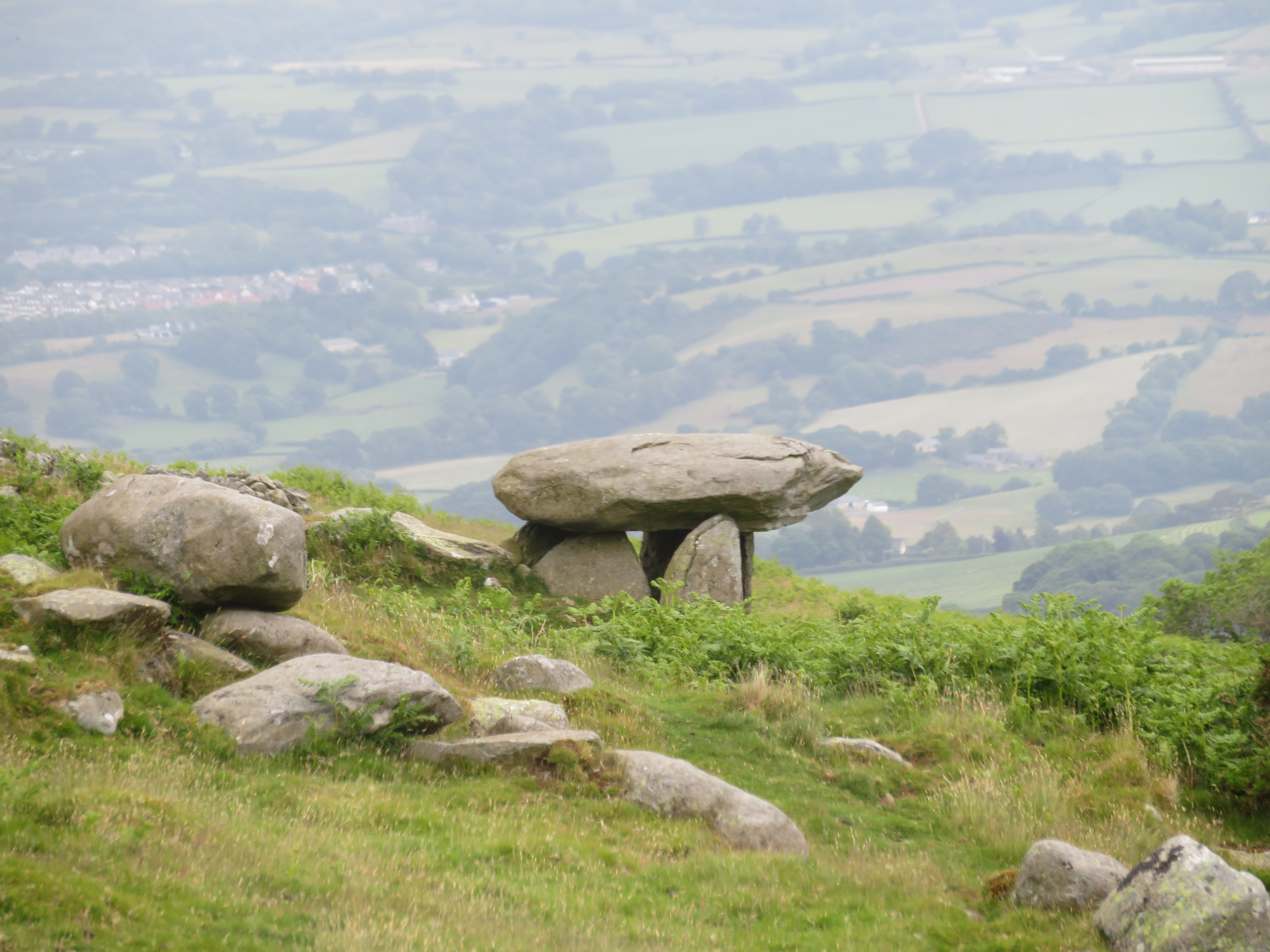
Siambr gladdu Oes y Cerrig, dolmen, c. 3000 BC.

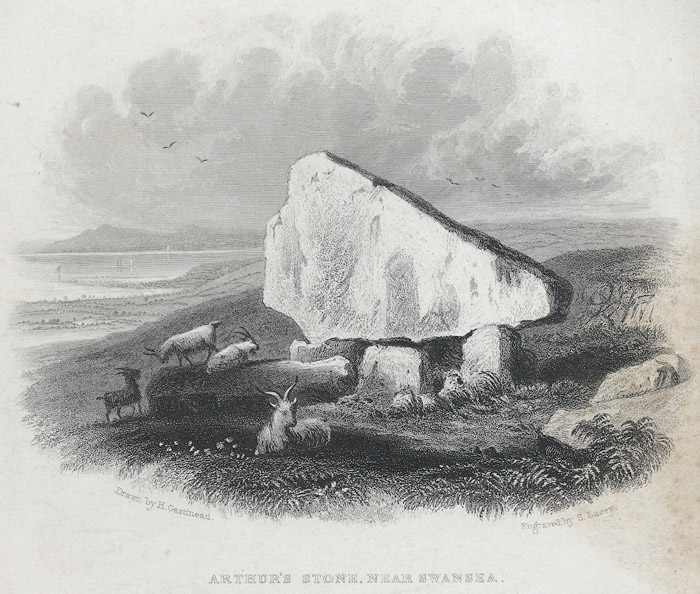
Maen Ceti (Arthur's stone) burial site, Gower

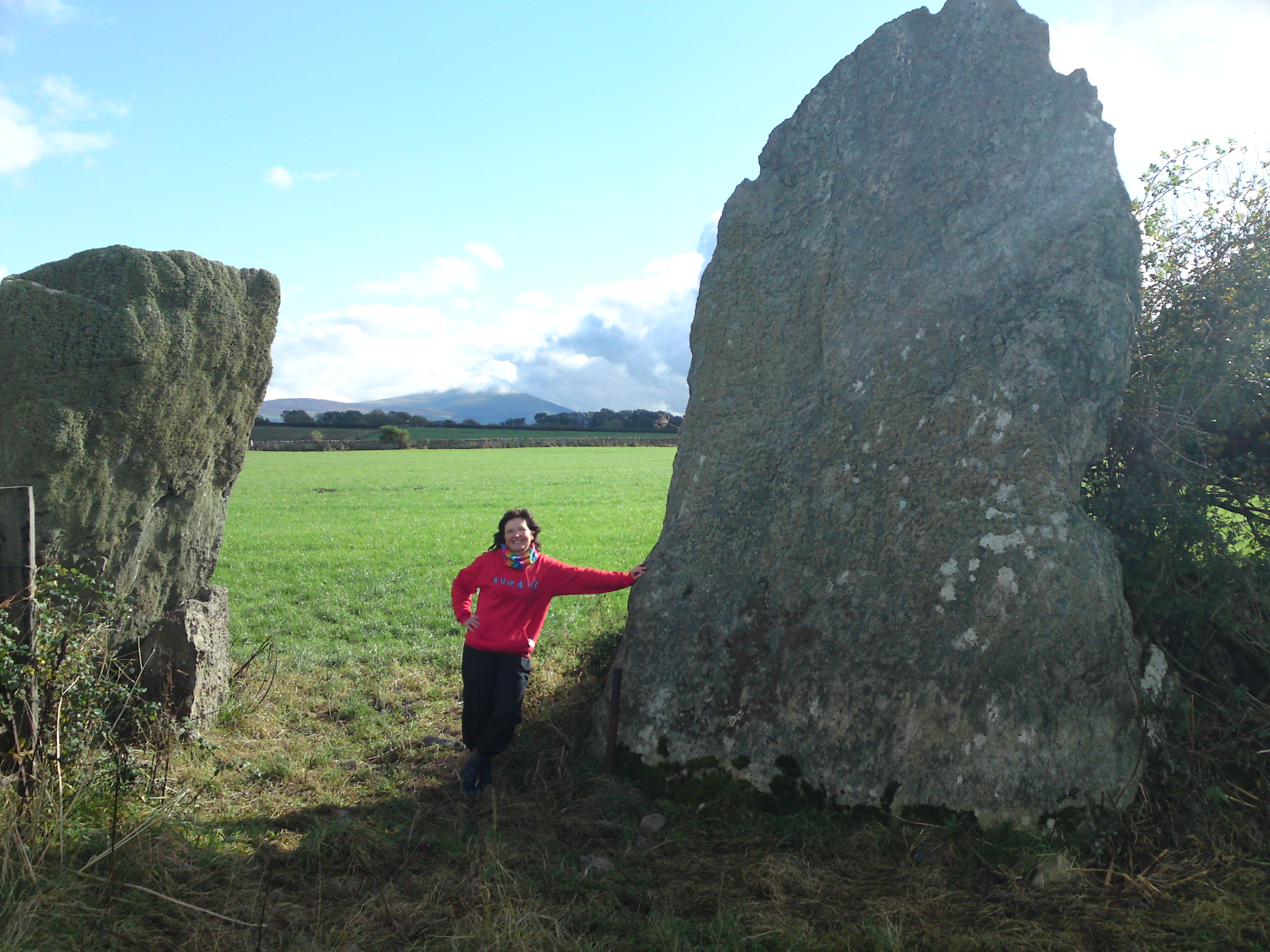
Bryn Gwyn stones

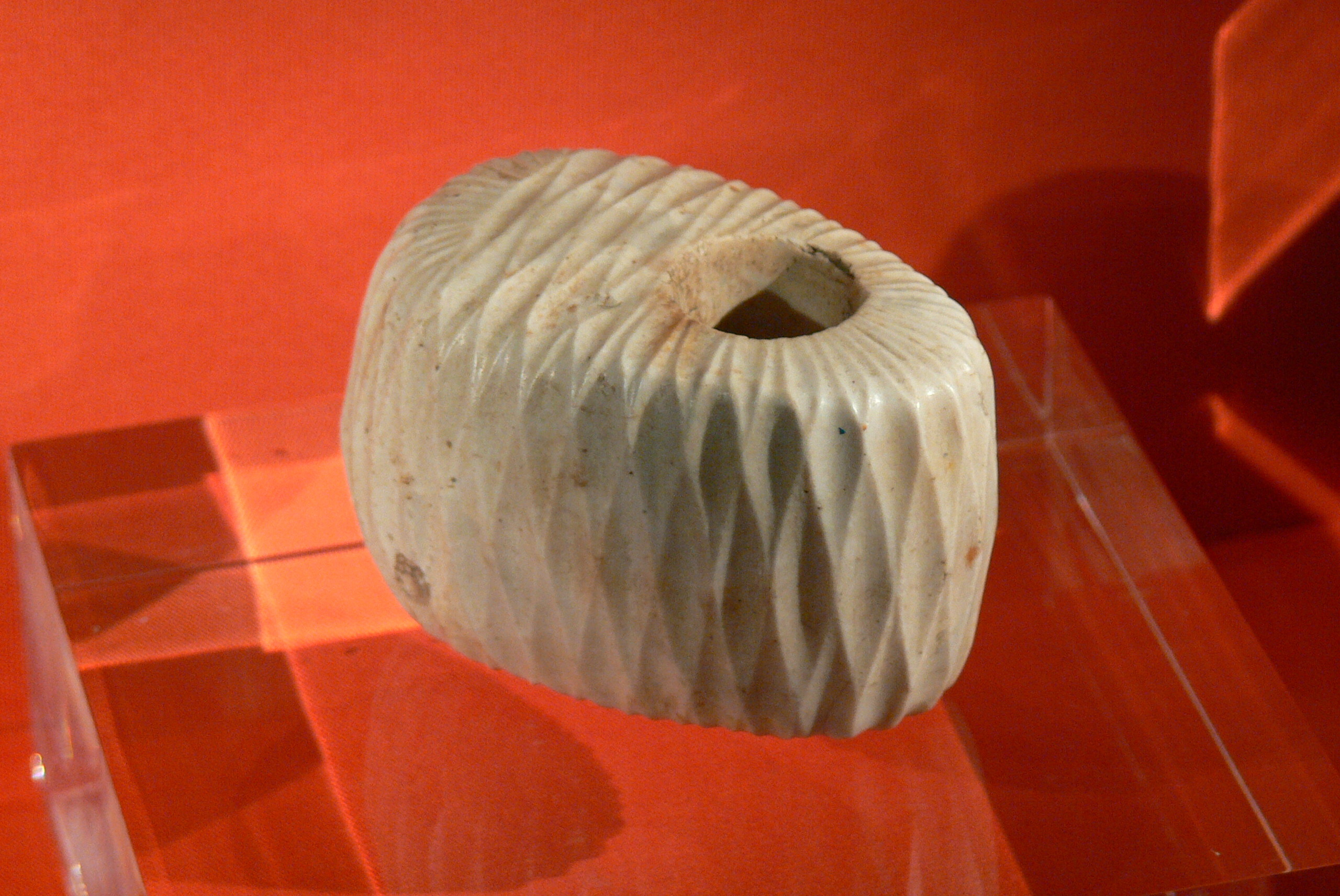
The Maesmor mace-head, c. 3000-2500 BC.

== The Bronze Age ==
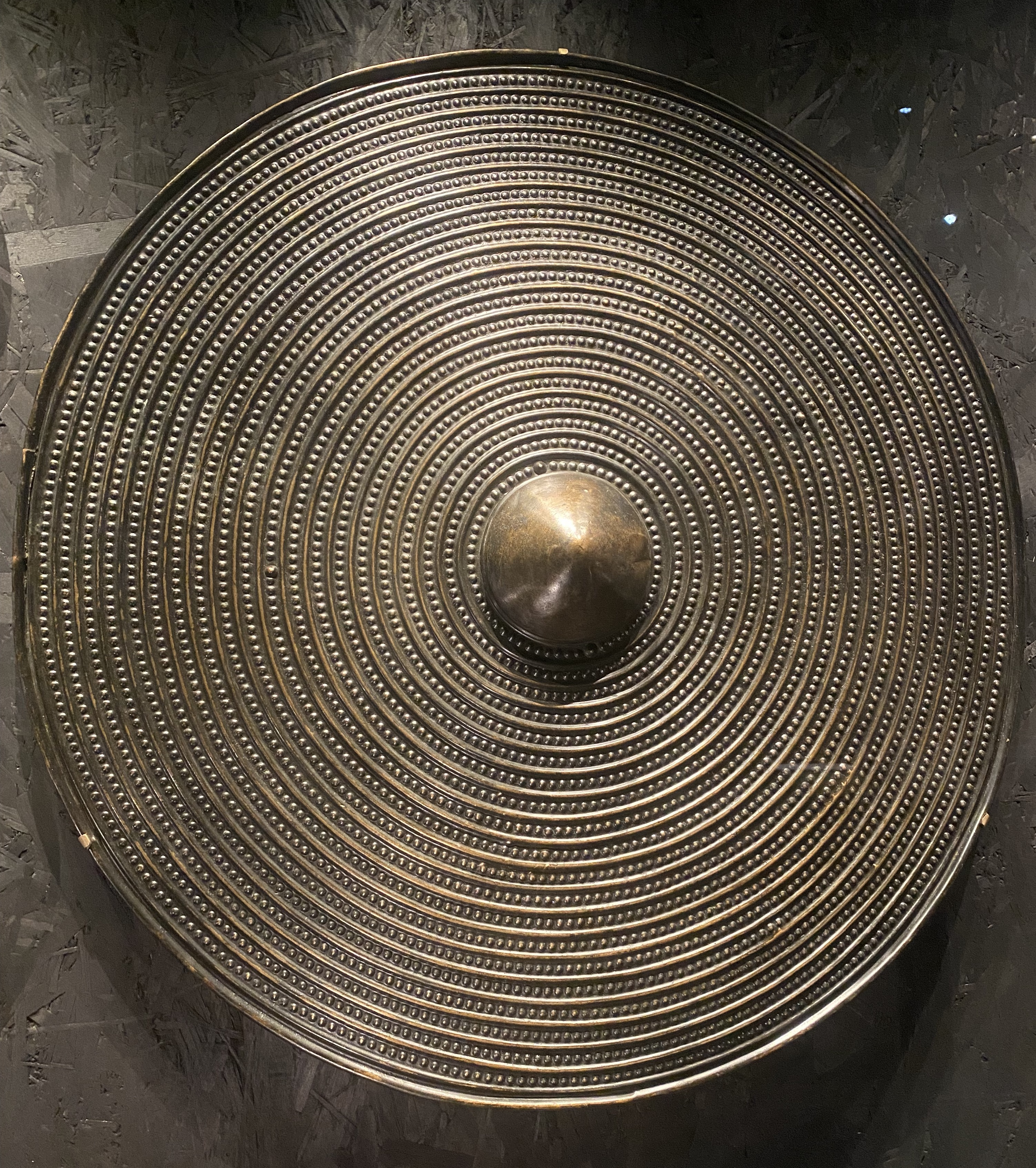
Rhyd y Gors Shield. Wales, 1200-1000 BC. On display at the British Museum.

Metal tools first appeared in Wales about 2500 BC with the Bell Beaker culture, initially copper followed by bronze. The climate during the Early Bronze Age (c. 2100-1400 BC) is thought to have been warmer than at present, as there are many remains from this period in what are now bleak uplands. Much of the copper for the production of bronze probably came from the copper mine on the Great Orme, where prehistoric mining on a very large scale dates largely from the middle Bronze Age. In particular copper from the Great Orme mines appears to have been used for the production of bronze implements of the Acton Park Complex, named after a hoard found at Acton Park near Wrexham. These tools, particularly axeheads, were developed towards the end of the Early Bronze Age and are innovative in both metallurgy and design. They were widely exported, with examples being found along the continental coast from Brittany to north Germany.

Burial practices in the Bronze Age differed from the communal tombs of the Neolithic period, with a change to burial in round barrows and the provision of grave goods. Inhumation was soon replaced by cremation and in Wales the cemetery mound with a number of burials had become the standard form by about 2000 BC. One of the most striking finds from Bronze Age Wales was the gold cape found in a tomb at Bryn yr Ellyllion, Mold, Flintshire dated to 1900-1600 BC, weighing 560 g and produced from a single gold ingot. Very few weapons have been found in Early Bronze Age graves in Wales compared with other objects, and the lack of traces of earlier Bronze Age settlements is thought to indicate that farms or hamlets were undefended.

From about 1250 BC, there was a deterioration in the climate, which became more marked from about 1000 BC, with higher rainfall and much lower summer temperatures. This led to an increase in peat formation and probably the abandonment of many upland settlements. It has been suggested that this led to conflict and to changes in social organization, with the earliest hillforts appearing about 800 BC.

The Late Bronze Age saw the development of more advanced bronze implements, with weapons becoming increasingly common. While the weapons reflect introduced styles, there are pronounced regional variations in the styles of tools, particularly axes. On the basis of tool types, Wales can be divided into four regions, These were, the Ordovices (Mid to North Wales & Anglesey), the Deceangli (North East Wales), the Demetae (South West Wales), and the Silures (South East Wales). These regions show an approximate correspondence to the territories of the tribes later recorded in these areas by the Romans.

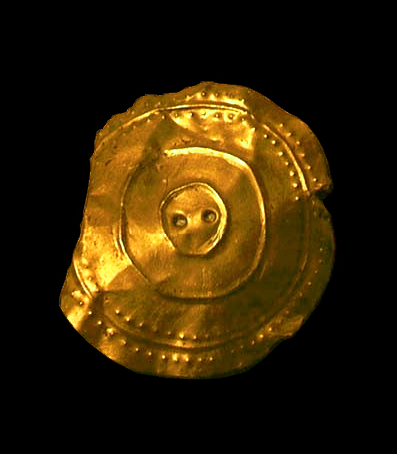
Gold Banc Ty'nddôl sun-disc. Bell Beaker culture, 2450-2150 BCE.

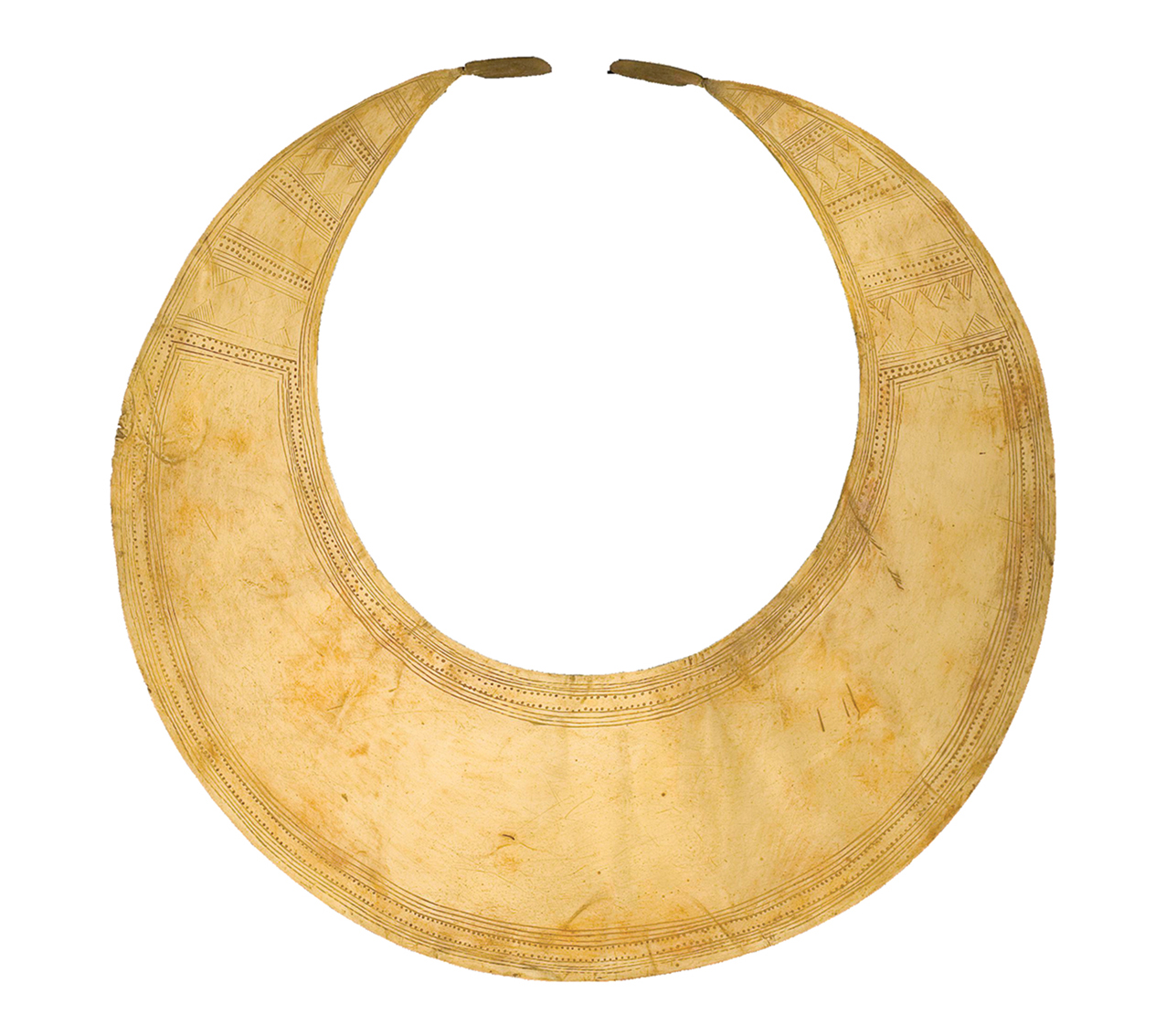
Gold lunula, Bell Beaker culture, 2400-2000 BC

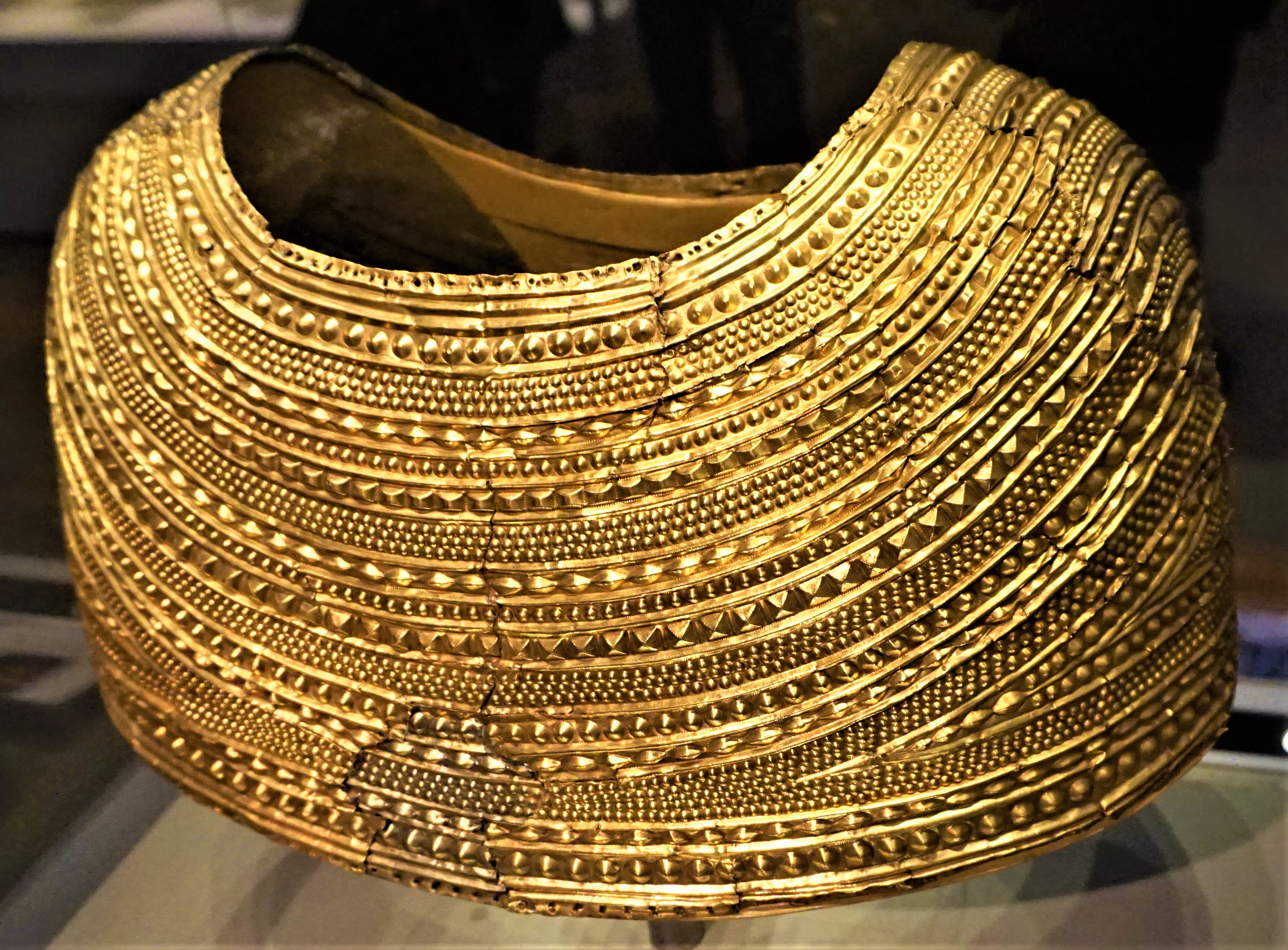
The Mold Cape, c. 1900-1700 BC

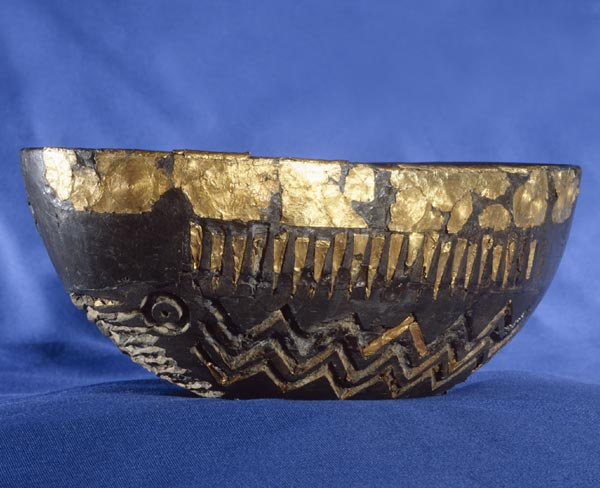
The Caergwrle Bowl, c. 1300 BC

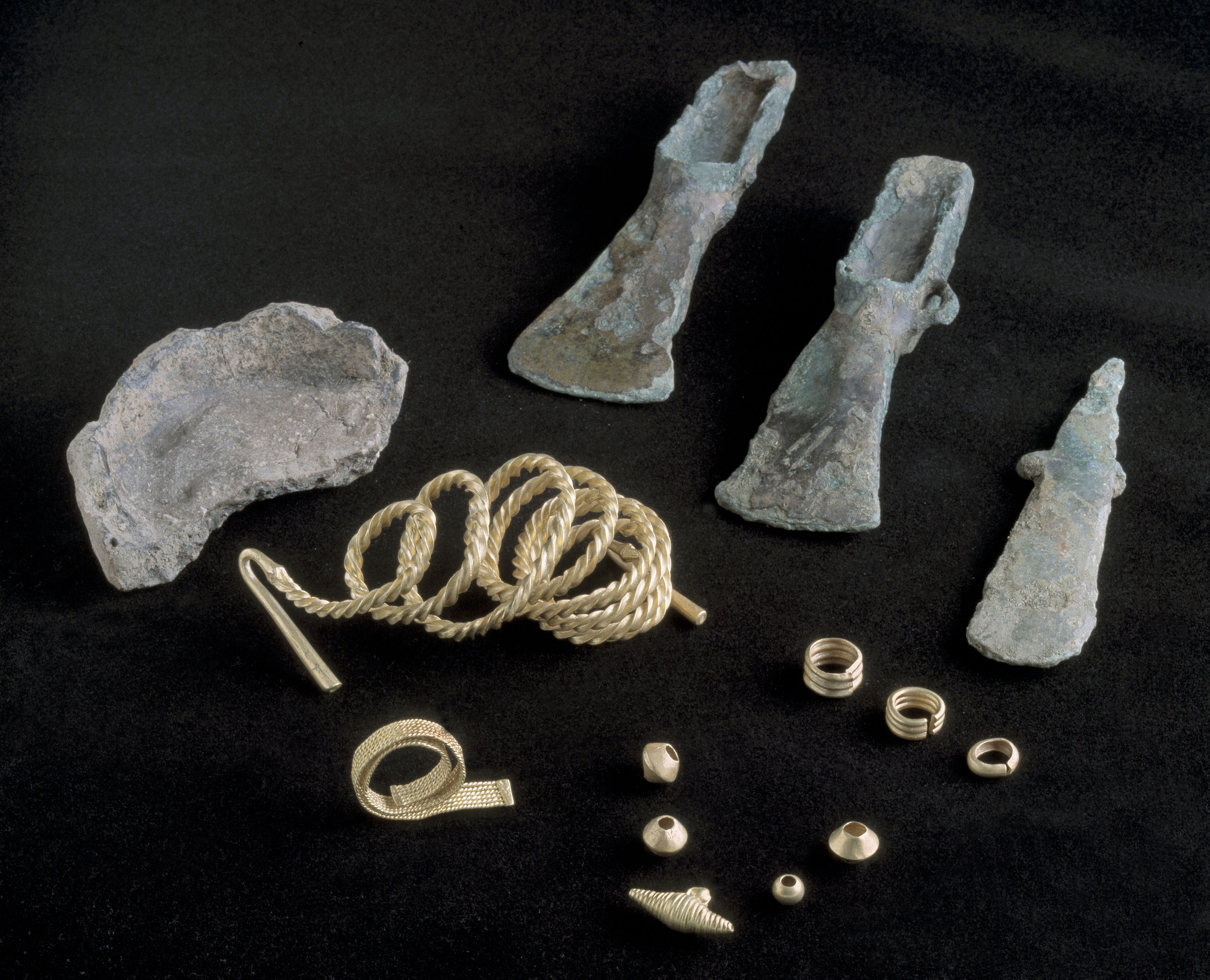
Gold and Bronze hoard from Wrexham, 1300-1150 BC

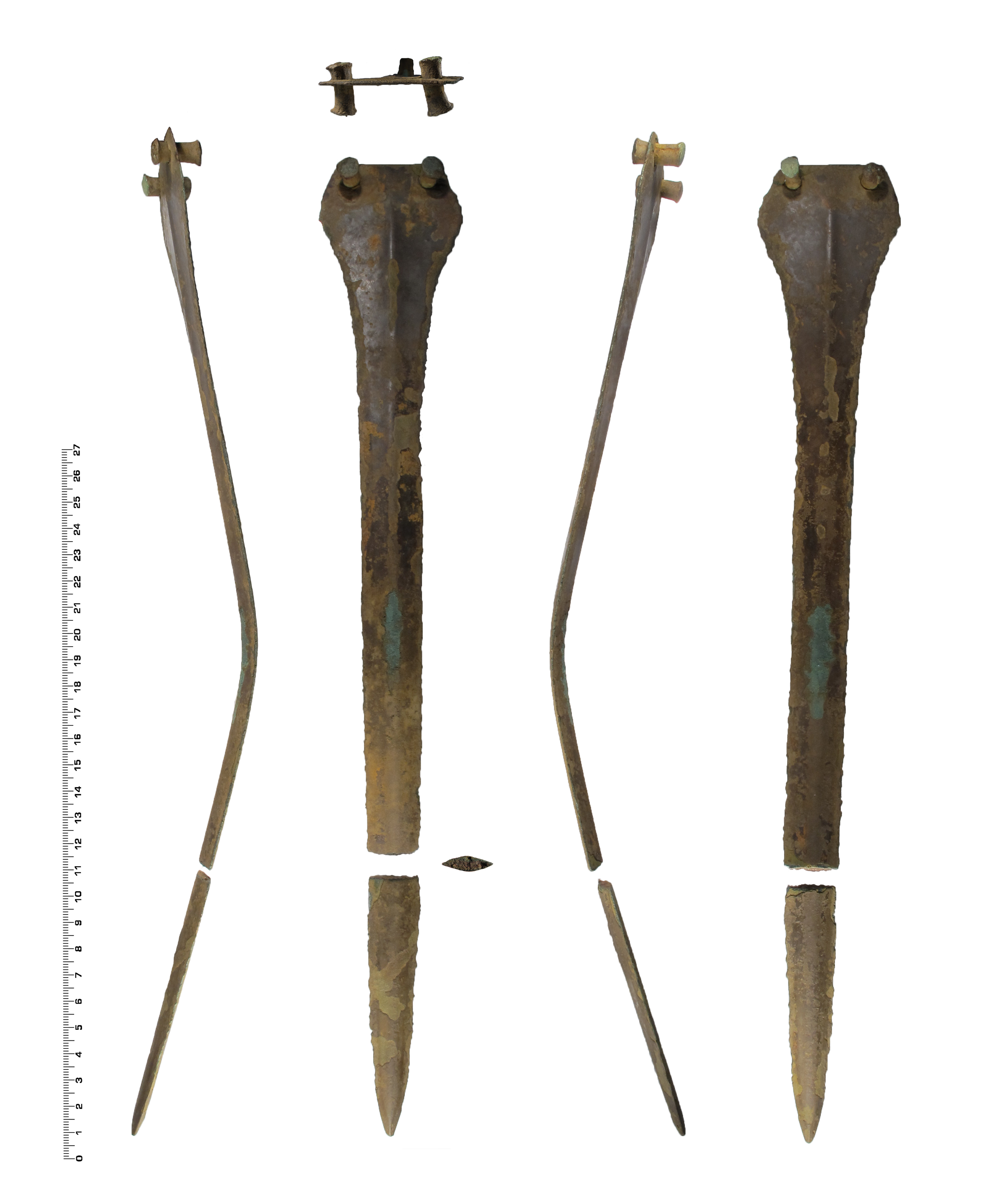
Bronze rapier sword

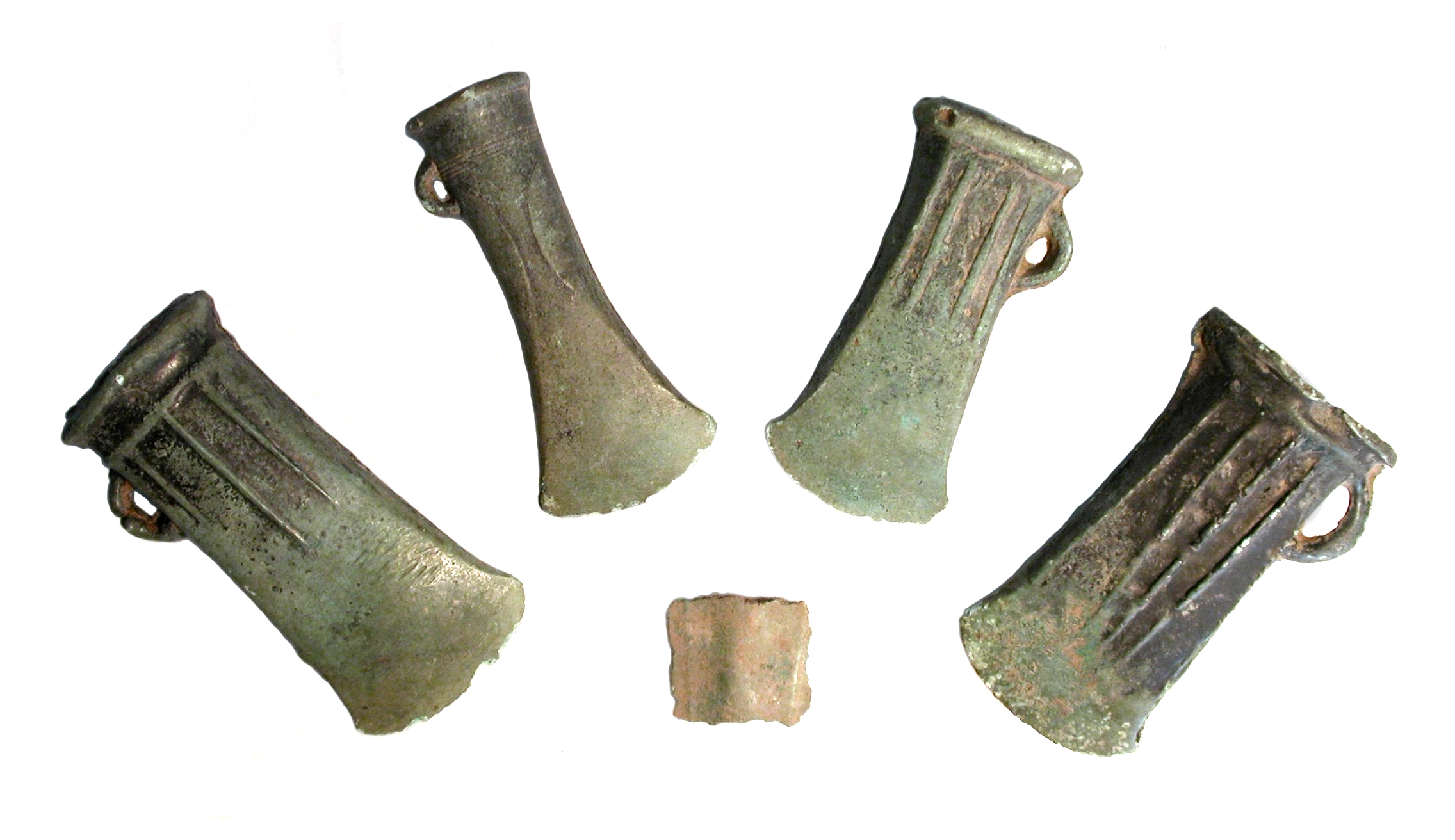
Bronze socketed axes

== The Iron Age ==
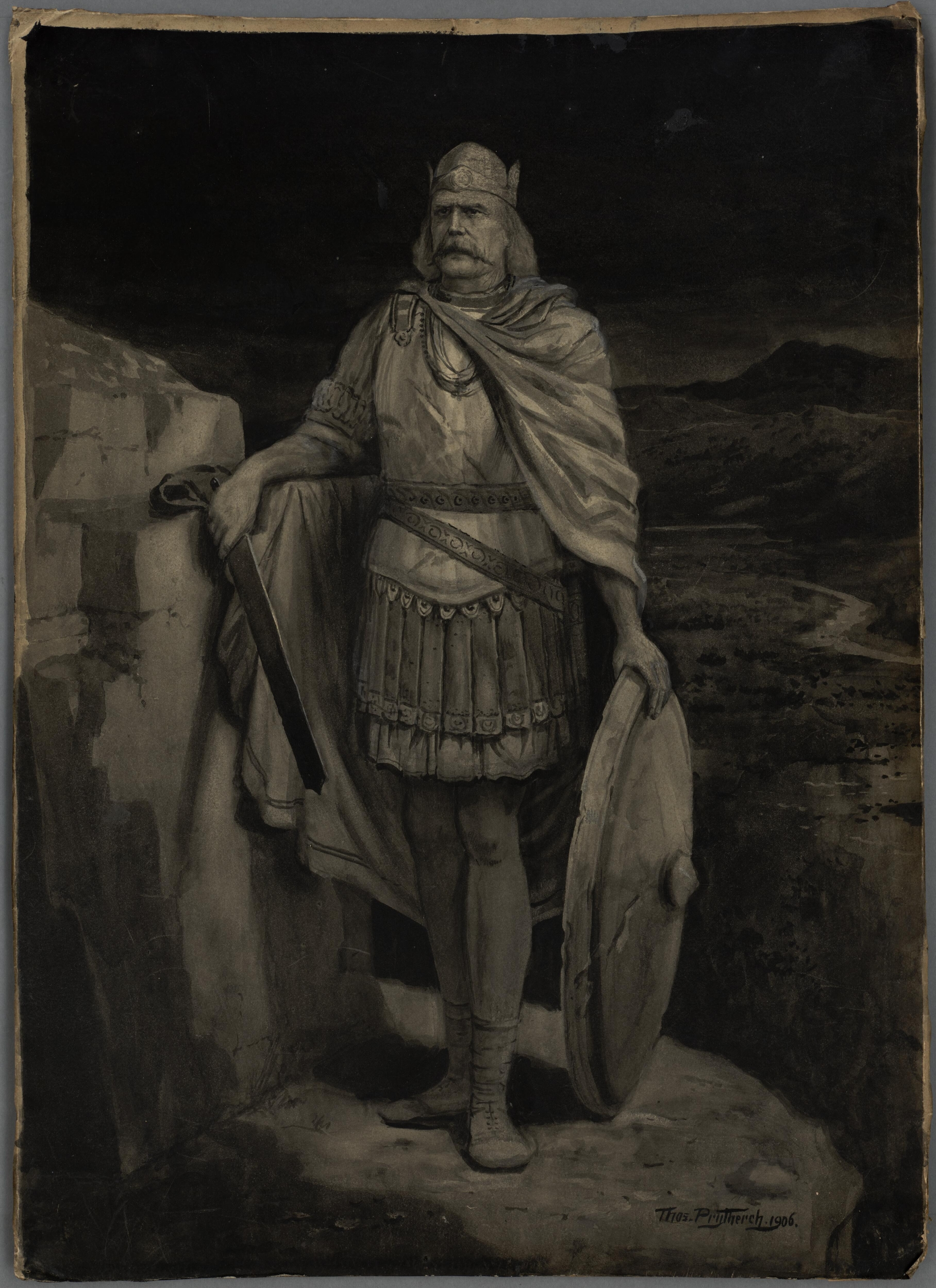
Caradog, leader of the Ordovices who fought his last battle against the Romans in 50 AD.

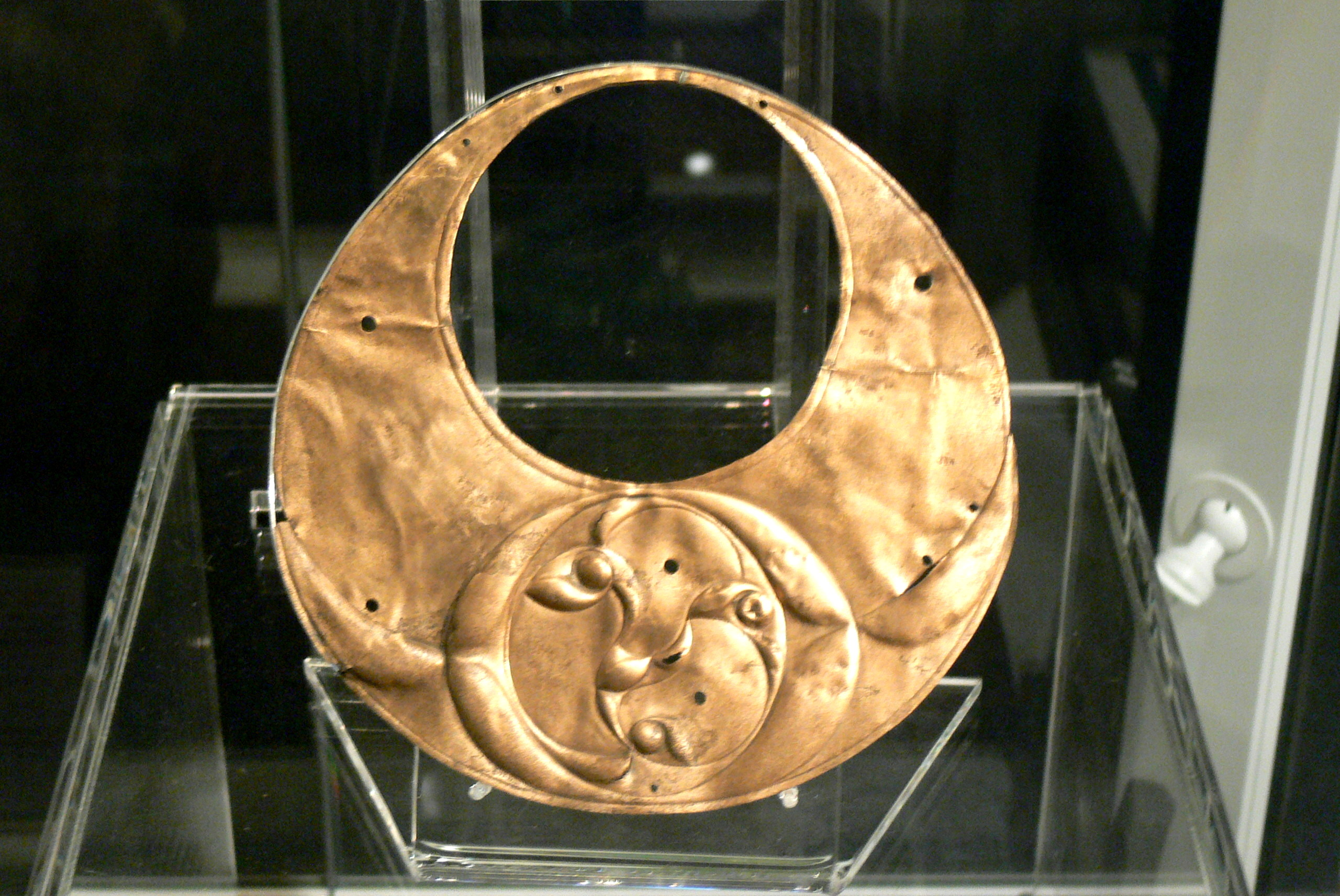
Llyn Cerrig Bach Plaque, 200BC-100 AD

The earliest iron implements found in Wales come from Llyn Fawr at the head of the Rhondda Valley, where objects apparently deposited as votive offerings include three made of iron: a sword, a spearhead and a sickle. These items are thought to date to about 650 BC, and while the sword appears to be imported, the sickle is an imitation of a native bronze prototype.

Over 600 hillfort were built in Wales and throughout the British Isles from c. 800 BC. The Iron Age saw the building of hillforts which are particularly numerous in Wales, including Pen Dinas near Aberystwyth and Tre'r Ceiri on the Llŷn Peninsula. The earliest distinctively Iron Age settlement in Wales is considered to be Castell Odo (modern-day Aberdaron), a small hillfort on the tip of the Llŷn Peninsula, the fort dates to about 400 BC but was actually settled during the late Bronze Age. The largest hillforts are most numerous along the eastern border of Wales, with some large examples also found in the lowlands of north-west Wales. In the south-west, by contrast, hillforts are very numerous but mainly small, with an area of under 1.2 hectares. An example on Anglesey is Arthur's Table (Welsh: Bwrdd Arthur / Din Sylwy) hillfort, it's an Iron Age settlement that was inhabited for a millennium until after the Roman period (c. 4 AD).

Din Lligwy, Iron Age hut circle ruins, Anglesey.

Some Celtic tribes originated in Germany and migrated throughout Western Europe, also to Britain and Ireland. These western European Iron Age tribes in Britain were established in the late Iron Age between c. 500 BC - 200 BC. Later in the Iron Age, stone roundhouses were being built from c. 500 BC (earliest). Hut circles were found throughout Wales and Celtic Europe. These stone-built roundhouses were occupied for nearly a thousand years and were used until the end of the Roman occupation of Great Britain during the 5th century. A well-preserved hut circle on Anglesey is Din Lligwy, the small village was dated from the Iron Age to Roman occupation. A hoard of Roman era pottery and coins were discovered in the 1905-07 archaeological excavation of Din Lligwy.

A particularly significant find from this period was made in 1943 at Llyn Cerrig Bach on Anglesey, when the ground was being prepared for the construction of a Royal Air Force base. The cache included weapons, shields, chariots along with their fittings and harnesses, and slave chains and tools. Many had been deliberately broken and seem to have been votive offerings. These finds are considered to be one of the most important collections of La Tène metalwork discovered in Britain. Pottery on the other hand is fairly rare in Wales during this period and most of what has been found appears to be imported. In 2018, the first-ever Celtic chariot burial found in southern Britain was discovered in Llanstadwell — associated with other burials and a multivallate fort. It has been dated to the second half of the first century AD

The La Tène culture is traditionally associated with the Celts, and the general view until fairly recently was that the appearance of this culture indicated a large-scale invasion by peoples who also brought a Celtic language which later developed into Welsh. The currently more popular view is that any movement of peoples was on a smaller scale, with cultural diffusion responsible for most of the changes. There is some evidence to support the latter model, such as burials associated with earlier religious sites. It has been suggested that a Celtic language was being spoken in Wales by about 700 BC.

=== Roman Iron Age ===
The prehistoric period ended with the arrival of the Roman army, who began their campaigns against the Welsh tribes in 48 AD with an attack on the Deceangli in north-east Wales, the era was deemed the Roman Iron Age. Wales was divided between a number of tribes, of which the Silures and the Ordovices put up the most stubborn resistance. The Roman conquest of Wales was complete by 79 AD. The reports of Roman historians such as Tacitus give a little more information about Wales in this period, such as that the island of Anglesey was apparently a stronghold of the Druids. The impact of the arrival of the Romans may have varied from one part of Wales to another; for example there is evidence that some hillforts, such as Tre'r Ceiri, continued to be occupied during the Roman period. An example of that era is the Welsh pre-Celtic (Goidelic) Silures tribe, who occupied their lands from the ancient times of Britain. The tribe later established a home in the Malvern Hills building earthworks to protect themselves from Ostorius Scapula and his Roman army. However, later in 78 AD, the Silures tribe was defeated by the Romans led by Frontinus from his nearby camp at the Roman fort of Ariconium which was then inhabited for 300 more years.

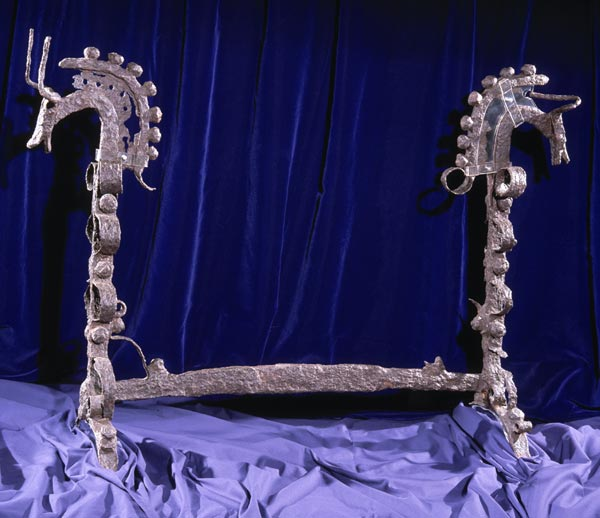
Capel Garmon Firedog, from Conwy.

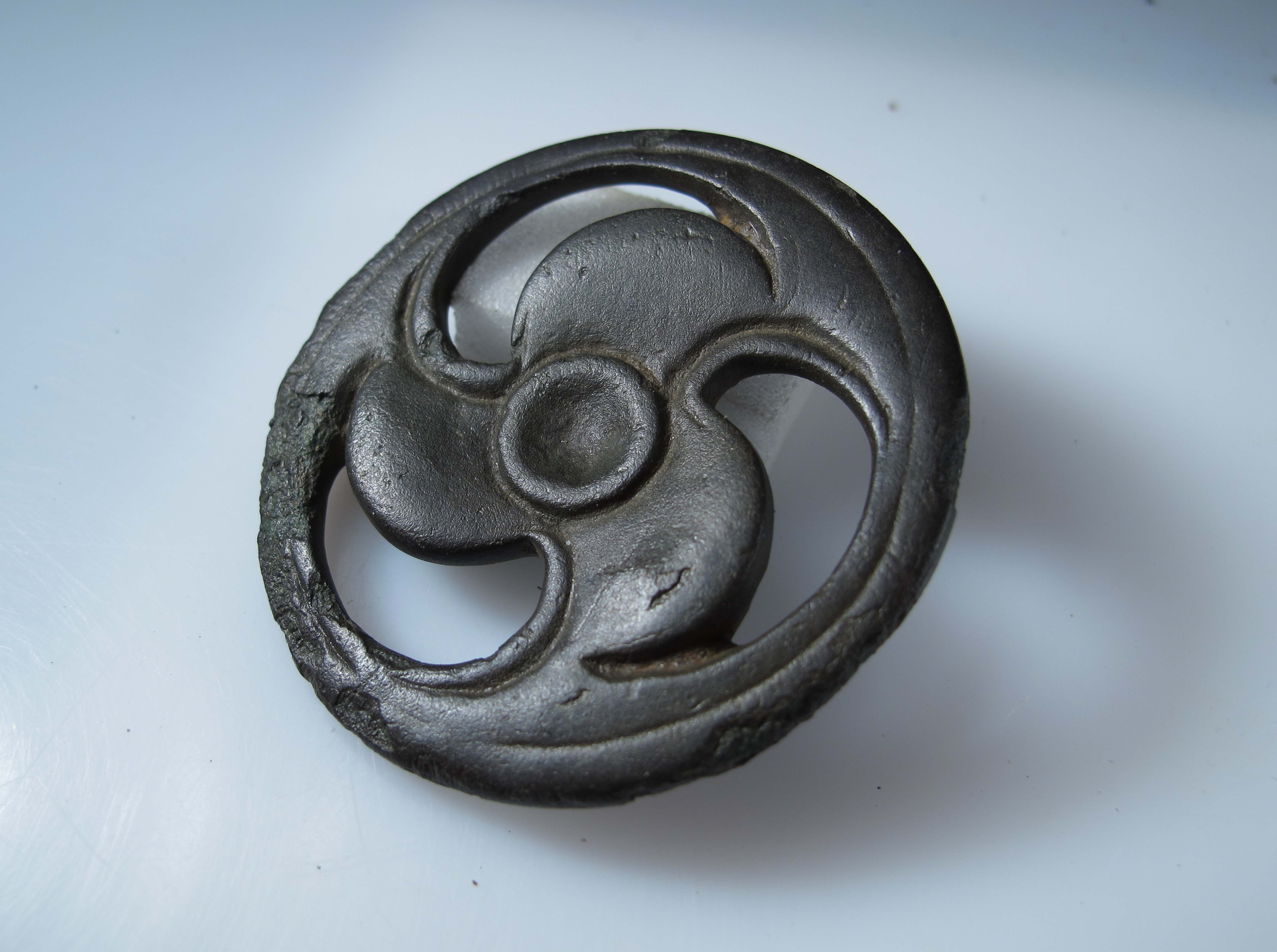
Copper alloy fob with triskele design

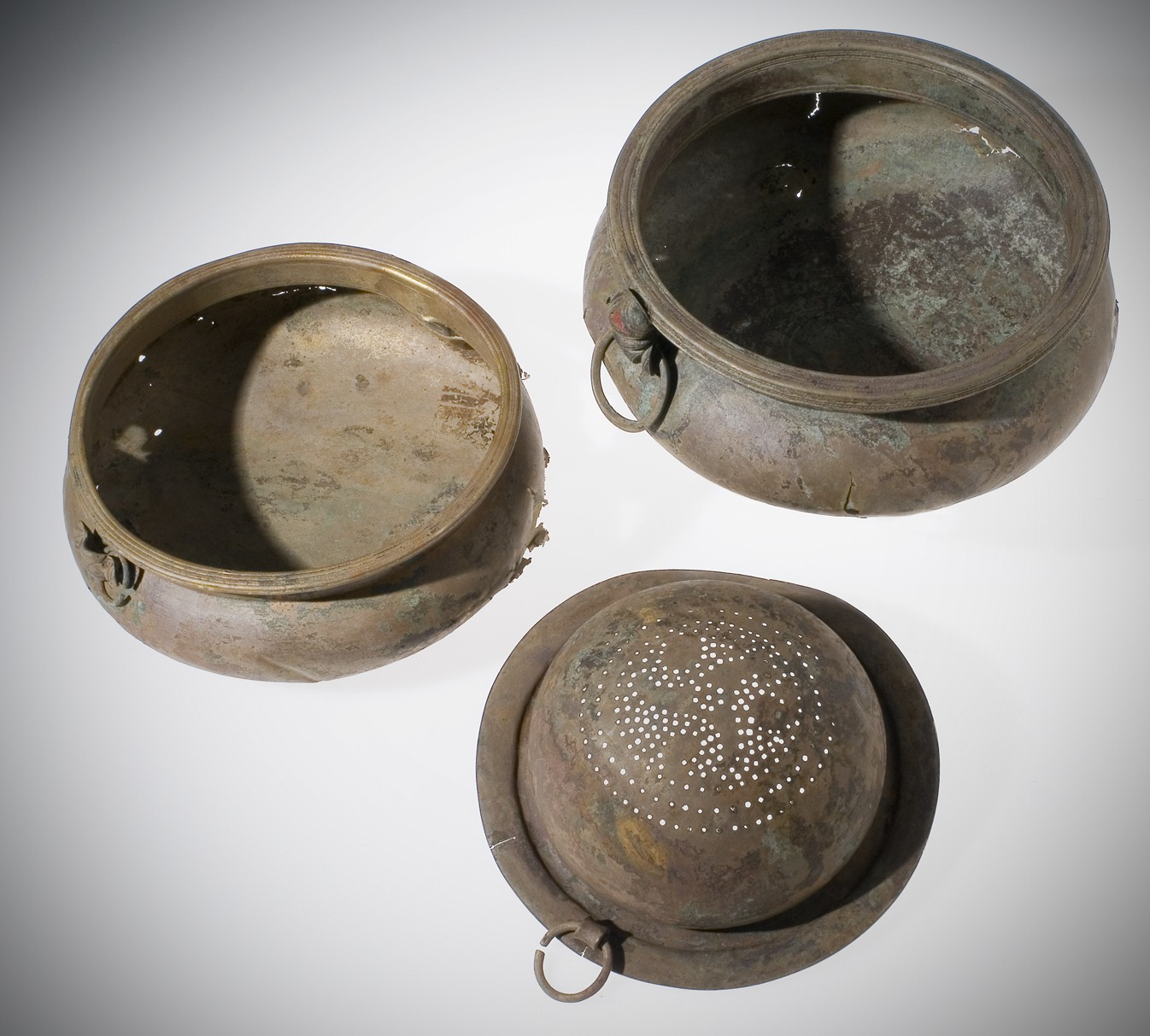
Bronze bowls and wine strainer with triskele design from Langstone, Newport.

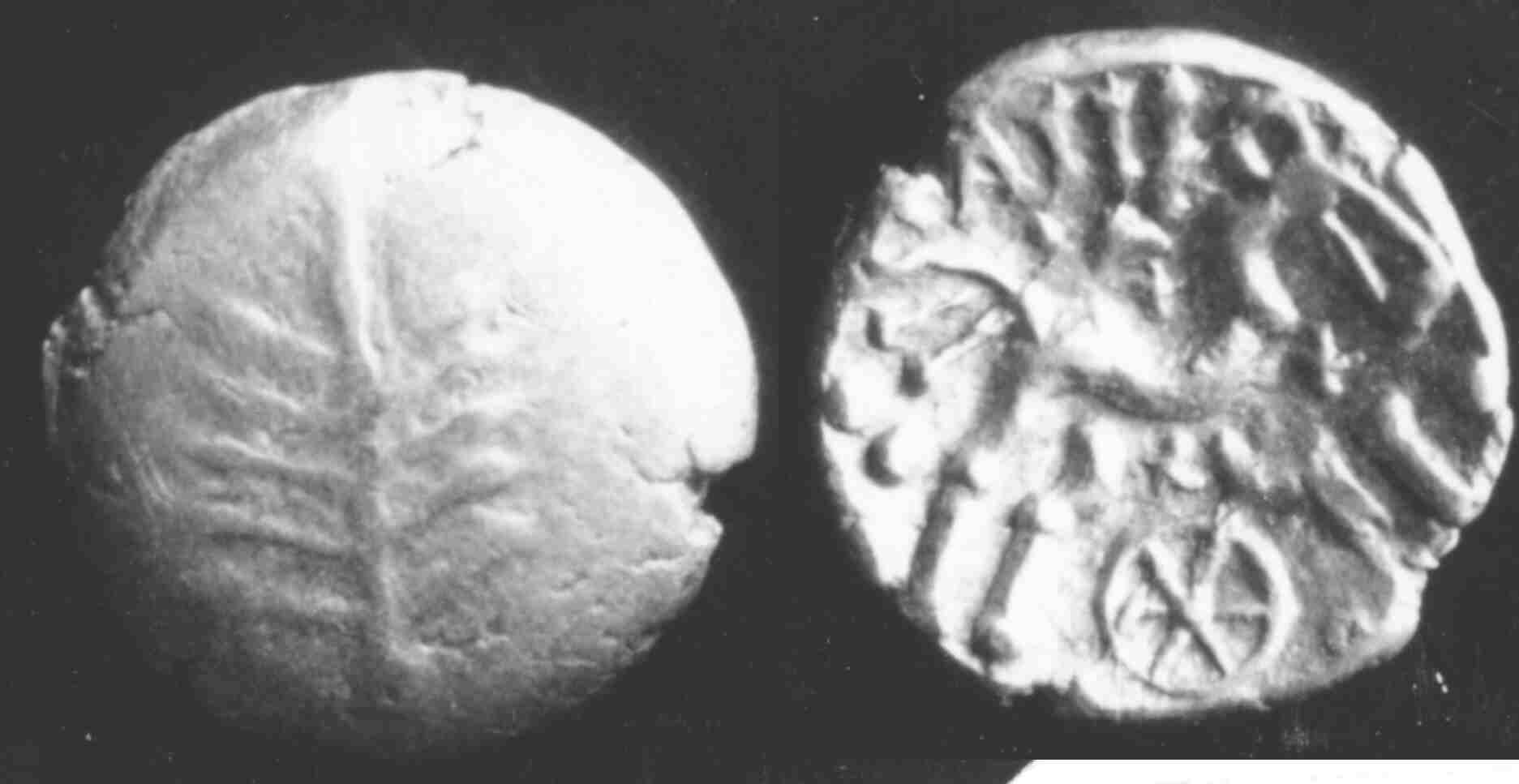
Gold coin of the Dobunni, found in Torfaen

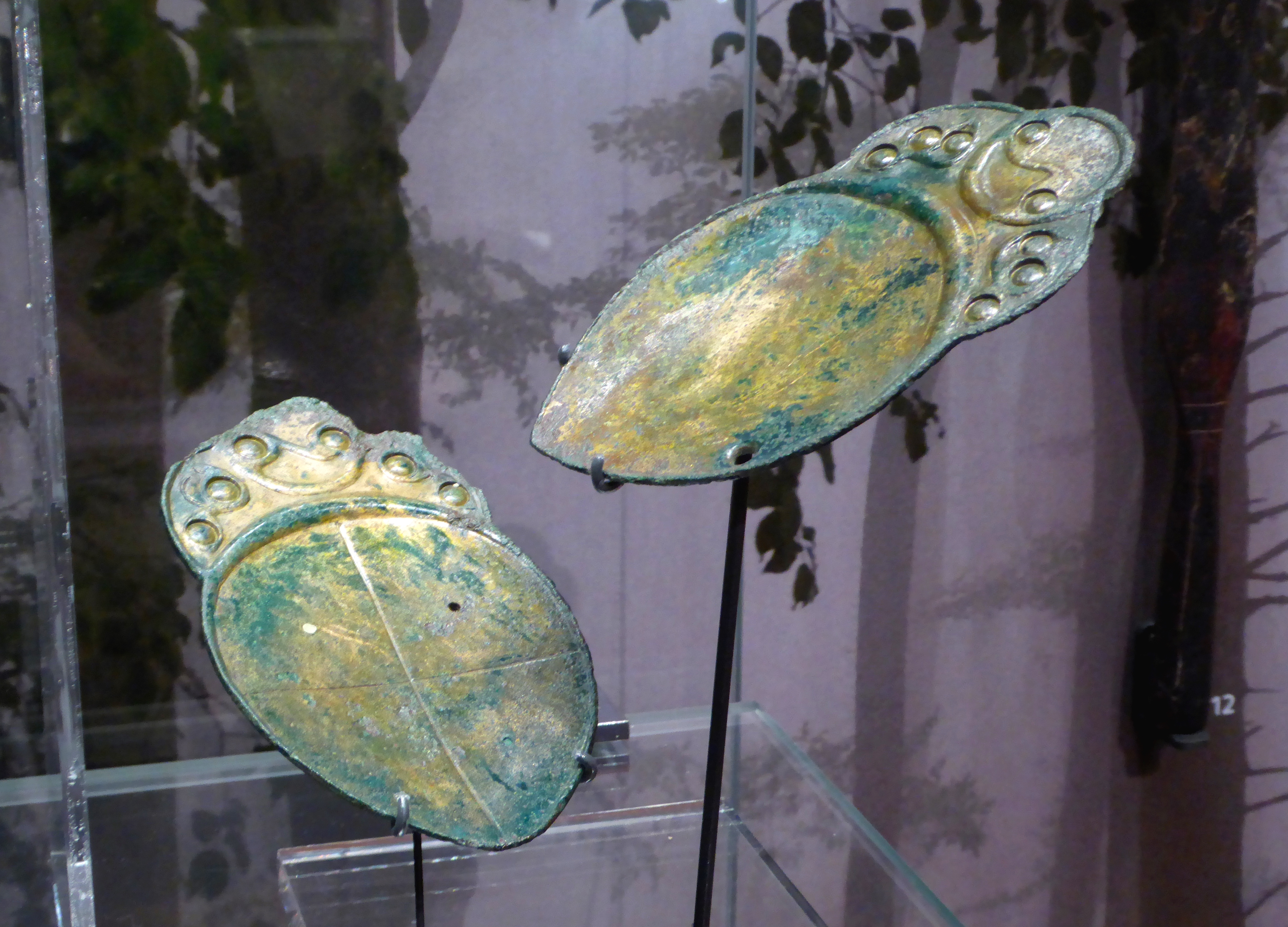
The Penbryn Spoons from Castell Nadolig, possibly used for divination.

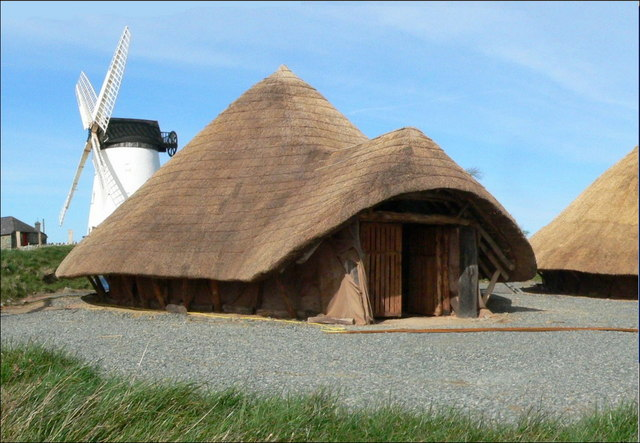
Reconstruction of an Iron Age roundhouse at Melin Llynon, Anglesey

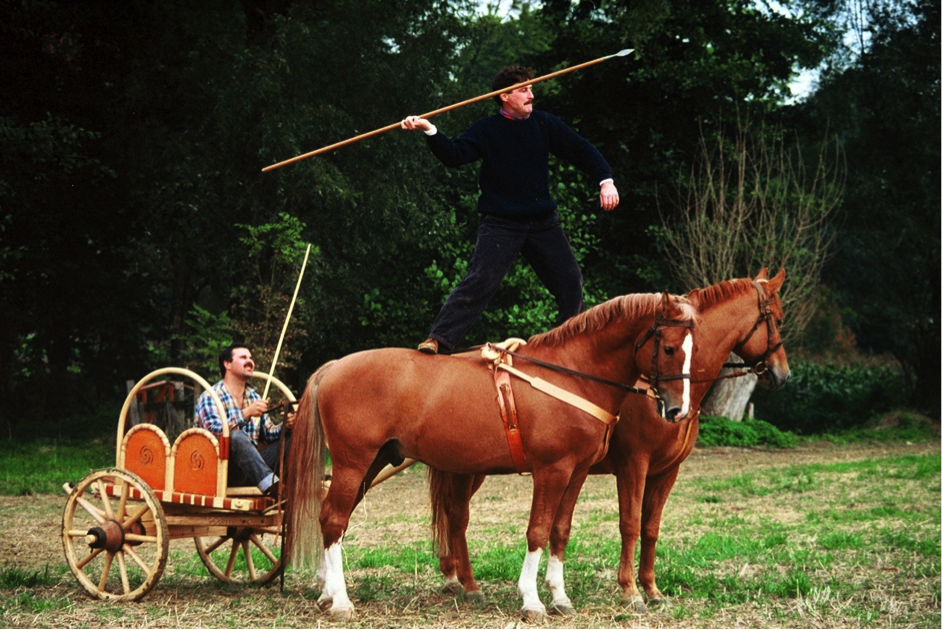
Reconstruction of an Iron Age chariot.

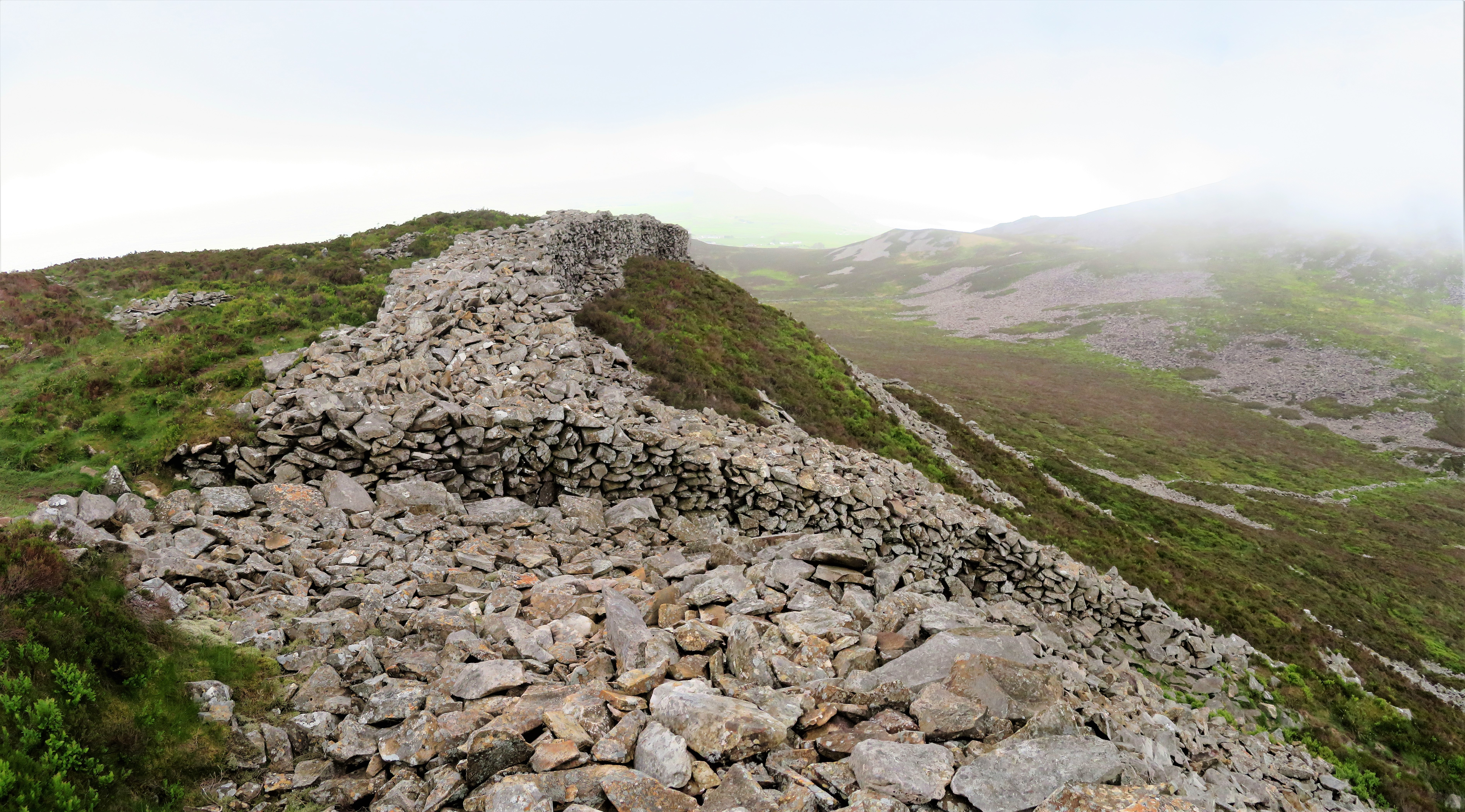
Remains of dry-stone fortifications at Tre'r Ceiri hillfort, Gwynedd

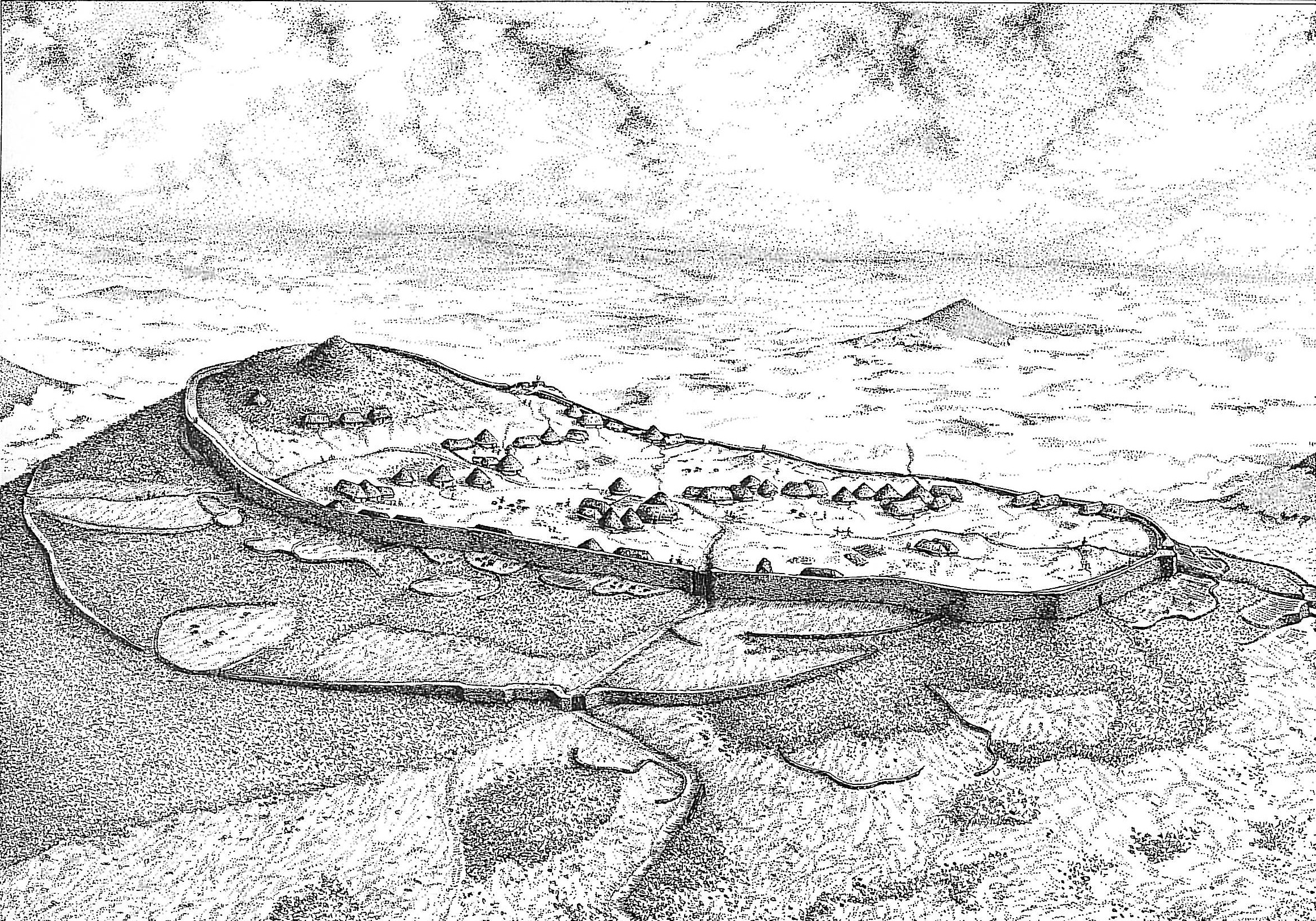
Tre'r Ceiri hillfort, artist's reconstruction

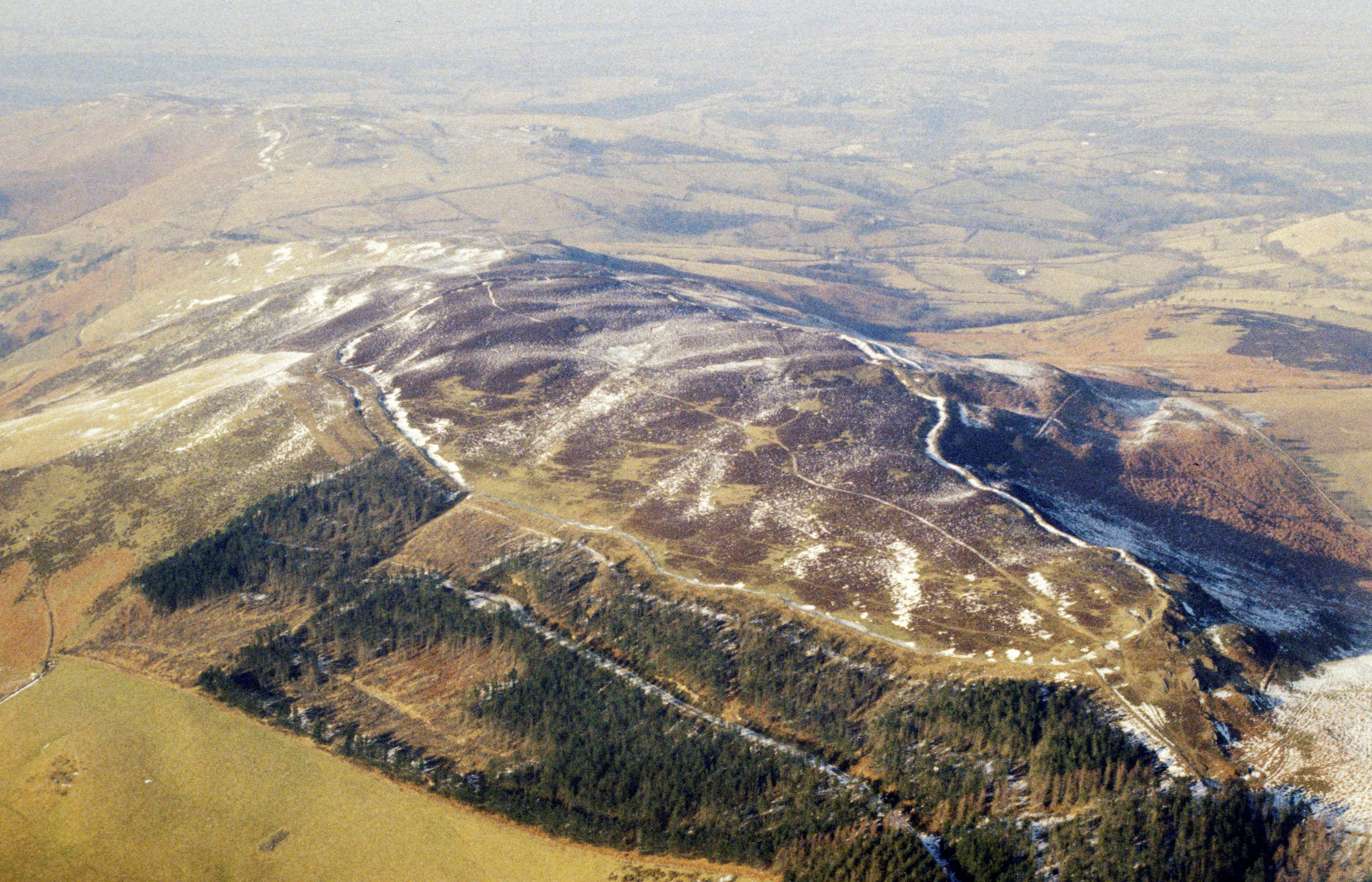
Penycloddiau hillfort remains,

== See also ==
- List of Cadw properties
- Archaeology of Wales
- Early history of Ireland
- Prehistoric Britain
- Prehistoric Scotland
- Prehistoric Europe

== Bibliography ==
- Bannister, Arthur Thomas (1861). "1". The history of Ewias Harold. Jakeman & Carver.
- Cunliffe, Barry W. (1978). Iron age communities in Britain : an account of England, Scotland, and Wales from the seventh century BC until the Roman conquest (2d ed.). London: Routledge & Kegan Paul. ISBN 071008725X.
- Davies, John (1994). A history of Wales. London: Penguin Books. ISBN 0-14-014581-8.
- Driver, Toby (6 August 2008). "Tre'r Ceiri Hillfort, Llanaelhaearn". RCAHMW.
- Driver, Toby (March 2024). "Axe Factory, Graig Lwyd;Graiglwyd". RCAHMW.
- Foster, I.Ll.; Daniel, Glyn (24 October 2014). Prehistoric and Early Wales (1st ed.). London: Routledge.
- Grimes, W. (1951). The Prehistory of Wales. Cardiff: The National Museum of Wales. ISBN 0-72-000042-4.
- Jacobi, R.M.; Higham, T.F.G. (November 2008). "The "Red Lady" ages gracefully: new ultrafiltration AMS determinations from Paviland". Journal of Human Evolution. 55 (5): 898–907. Bibcode:2008JHumE..55..898J. doi:10.1016/j.jhevol.2008.08.007. PMID 18929395.
- Jones, J. Graham (2014). The history of Wales. Cardiff, Wales : University of Wales Press. ISBN 978-1-78316-169-0.
- Koch, Thomas (2005). Celtic Culture: a Historical Encyclopedia. ABC-Clio. p. 945. ISBN 1851094407.
- Koch, John; Cunliffe, Barry; Cleary, Kerry; Gibson, Catriona (1 September 2016). "opper mining, prospection and the Beaker Phenomenon in Wales – The significance of the Banc Tynddol gold disc". Celtic from the West 3: Atlantic Europe in the Metal Ages — questions of shared language. Oxbow Books. pp. 111–138. doi:10.2307/j.ctvh1dhg7.7. ISBN 978-1-78570-230-3.
- Lloyd, John Edward (1911). A History of Wales: From the Norman Invasion to the Edwardian Conquest. Barnes & Noble Publishing. ISBN 978-0-7607-5241-8.
- Lynch, Frances (1995). Gwynedd. London: H.M.S.O. ISBN 0-11-701574-1.
- Lynch, F. M. (1991). Prehistoric Anglesey : the archaeology of the island to the Roman conquest (2nd ed.). Llangefni: Anglesey Antiquarian Society. ISBN 0950019976.
- Lynch, Frances (2000). Prehistoric Wales. Stroud [England]: Sutton Pub. ISBN 0-7509-2165-X.
- Pitts, M (2006). "Sensational new discoveries at Bryn Celli Ddu". British Archaeology. 89: 6.
- RCAHMW, An Inventory of the Ancient Monuments in Anglesey. Vol. 2. Royal Commission on the Ancient and Historical Monuments of Wales. 1960.
- Richards, MP; Trinkaus, E (September 2009). "Out of Africa: modern human origins special feature: isotopic evidence for the diets of European Neanderthals and early modern humans". Proc. Natl. Acad. Sci. U.S.A. 106 (38): 16034–9. Bibcode:2009PNAS..10616034R. doi:10.1073/pnas.0903821106. PMC 2752538. PMID 19706482.
- Smith, George (February 2018). "Hillforts and Hut Groups of North-West Wales". Internet Archaeology (48). doi:10.11141/ia.48.6.
- Taylor, J. A. (1980). Culture and environment in prehistoric Wales : selected essays. Oxford, Eng.: B.A.R. ISBN 0-86054-079-0.
- Wiles, John (2007). "Trwyn Du Cairn near Aberffraw, Overlying A Mesolithic Site (302323)". Coflein. RCAHMW.
- Wiles, John (2007). "Din Sylwy or Bwrdd Arthur (93842)". Coflein. RCAHMW.
- Williams, Emyr. W. (2015). "The Roman Conquest of the Ordovices reconsidered" (PDF). NLW Journal. XXXVI (2).
- Whittle, Elisabeth (1992). A guide to ancient and historical Wales. Glamorgan and Gwent. London: HMSO. ISBN 0117012211.

=== Online ===
- "Wales' earliest village?". Current Archaeology. London: Current Publishing. 5 October 2017.
- "Early Celtic Societies in North Wales project – Excavations at Meillionydd 2010". Prifysgol Bangor University. 2010. Archived from the original on 20 December 2016.
- "The Penbryn Spoons". British Archaeology at the Ashmolean Museum.
- "Prehistoric Wales". cadw.gov.wales.
- "Bryn Celli Ddu". cadw.gov.wales. Cadw.
- "Siambr Gladdu Tŷ Newydd". cadw.llyw.cymru.
- "Din Lligwy Hut Group". cadw.gov.wales.
- Hotchin, Becky (23 June 2022). "Pembrokeshire Iron Age chariot Celtic finds are treasure". Western Telegraph.
- "Trustees' Report for the year ended 31st March 2019" (PDF). dyfedarchaeology.org.uk. Dyfed Archaeological Trust. 2019. p. 24.
- "Early Bronze Age gold disc". National Museum Wales.
- "A Stone Age masterpiece - A Mace-head from North Wales". National Museum of Wales.
- "The Capel Garmon Firedog". museum.wales.
- "The Langstone treasure". museum.wales.
- "Iron Age chariot". museum.wales.
- "Gods and War" (PDF). museum.wales.
- "The 'Red Lady' of Paviland". oumnh.ox.ac.uk. Oxford University.
- "Upper jaw of a Neanderthal child aged around 8 years old". Peoples Collection Wales.
- "The oldest people in Wales - Neanderthal teeth from Pontnewydd Cave". Peoples Collection Wales.
- "Coygan Cave (Carmarthenshire). No human remains have been found here, just a handful of tools that show that Neanderthals used the cave briefly". Peoples Collection Wales.
- "The Cave Men of Ice Age Wales". Peoples Collection Wales.
- "A Tale as Ancient as Time: Exploring the Archaeology of Early Societies in the Llŷn Peninsula". 20 January 2023.
- "Mesolithic main page". Dyfed Archaeological Trust. 2024.
