= Llyn Cerrig Bach Plaque =

Iron Age bronze plaque found in Wales

- Cilgant Llyn Cerrig Bach
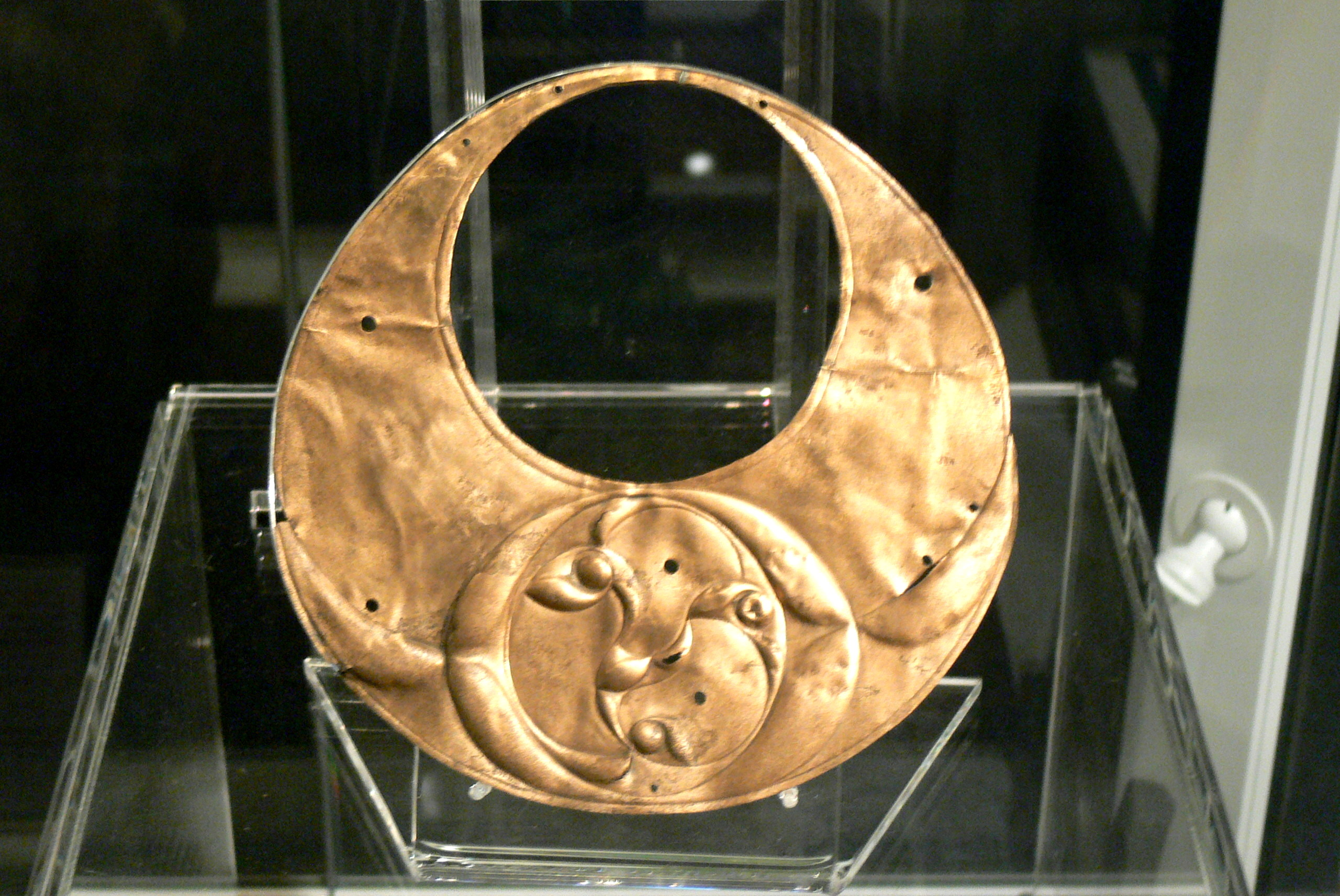
- Material: Bronze
- Symbols: triskele
- Period/culture: Iron Age 200BC - 100AD
- Discovered: Llyn Cerrig Bach

Llyn Cerrig Bach Plaque (Welsh: Cilgant Llyn Cerrig Bach) is a bronze plaque that dates from 200BC to AD100 in the Iron Age, found at Llyn Cerrig Bach.

The plaque is a decorative sheet bronze mount of insular La Tène design which may have been used to decorate a shield.

== History ==
The Llyn Cerrig Bach Plaque is a bronze plaque which may have been used to decorate a shield, that dates between 200BC and AD100. It was thrown into Llyn Cerrig Bach, Anglesey (Ynys Môn). The three legged triskele symbol, which may be inspired by a puffin, and also referred to as a trumpet motif, could represent the living, the dead and the gods or the cycle of birth life and death.

Others believe the triskele symbol on the plaque to represent earth, wind and water. The pattern has been beaten from the reverse skillfully and it may have been placed on a chariot, shield or musical instrument in the Iron Age.

Amgueddfa Cymru's, Dr Mark Redknap stated that the plaque is "widely recognised to be of profound ‘dynamic character and significance’ for understanding Early Celtic art in Britain". The plaque is one of the most significant of 181 pieces of insular La Tène metalwork discovered in Llyn Cerrig Bach that were found during the construction of RAF Valley in 1942 as a result of peat extraction.

John Creighton suggests that druids may have influenced artistic design and on coins, demonstrating their expressive power and authority, with the Llyn Cerrig Bach plaque being an example of this.

Llyn Cerrig Bach finds were displayed at Oriel Ynys Môn in Llangefni from July 14 until November 11, 2012.

== See also ==
- Archaeology of Wales
- Celtic Britons
- Celtic art

== Bibliography ==
- "Llyn Cerrig Bach treasures to be exhibited at Oriel Ynys Mon". Museum Wales.
- Aldhouse-Green, Miranda (15 September 2021). Rethinking the Ancient Druids: An Archaeological Perspective. University of Wales Press. ISBN 978-1-78683-799-8.
- "BBC - A History of the World - Object : Crescentic plaque from Llyn Cerrig Bach". www.bbc.co.uk.
- Fox, C. "A Group of Bronzes of the Eartly Iron Age in Yeovil Museum" (PDF).
- Garrow, Duncan; Gosden, Chris (2012). Technologies of Enchantment?: Exploring Celtic Art : 400 BC to AD 100. Oxford University Press. ISBN 978-0-19-954806-4.
- Koch, John T. (2006). Celtic culture : a historical encyclopedia. Santa Barbara, Calif.: ABC-CLIO. ISBN 978-1851094400.
- Macdonald, Philip (2007). Llyn Cerrig Bach: A study of the Copper Alloy Artefacts from the Insular La Tène Assemblage. University of Wales Press.
- "Treasures discovered in Anglesey lake to be displayed". North Wales Chronicle. 17 May 2012.
- "Crescentic plaque". Peoples Collection Wales. 2011.
- Piggott, Stuart; Daniel, Glyn E. (28 April 2011). A Picture Book of Ancient British Art. Cambridge University Press. ISBN 978-0-521-17640-8.
