= Capel Garmon Firedog =

Likely Iron Age artefact found in Wales

- Pentan Capel Garmon
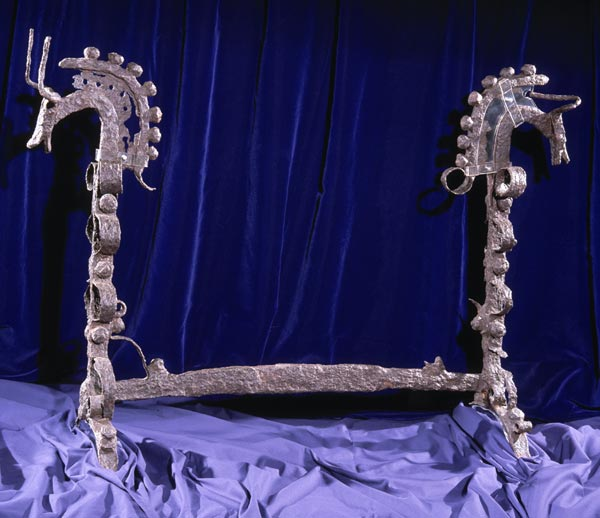
- Material: Iron
- Weight: Originally ~38kg
- Period/culture: Late Iron Age
- Discovered: Capel Garmon, Conwy, Wales
- Present location: Sain Ffagan

The Capel Garmon Firedog (Welsh: Pentan Capel Garmon) is likely to be a late Iron Age Andiron found in Capel Garmon, Wales.

== History ==
The firedog was found in a field at Carreg Goedog Farm in Capel Garmon, Conwy. It was deeply buried on its side when found, with a large stone at both ends. The way in which the artefact was placed suggests it may have been an offering to a Celtic god.

The Antiquaries Journal notes that the firedog was found in a peat bog in Denbighshire in 1852, and had been familiar with students who studied Iron Age art since it was published by J. Romilly Allen in 1901. The firedog was preserved nearby in Voelas Hall upon its discovery.

Colonel J. C. Wynne Finch, who owned the firedog and was a governor of the National Museum of Wales, lent it to the National Museum in Cardiff for a period of two years beginning in April 1939.

The firedog was transferred to Amgueddfa Cymru – National Museum Wales as an Acceptance in Lieu (AIL) scheme which enables a taxpayer to transfer art and heritage objects into public ownership as part or full payment of inheritance tax.

== Proposed use ==
The firedog was originally one of a pair at the hearth of a roundhouse of a chieftain. The animal head on each side of the fire dog could be a representation of a horse, dog or mythical beast.

J. Evans quotes an opinion on the potential use of the firedog: "I would suggest that this instrument is intended to hold the spits for roasting fowls, game or other small animals. … The loops on the side are evidently intended for that purpose, and it is probable that the horns of the two heads are intended for supporting a larger one".

X-ray scans of the firedog performed alongside a replica-making process demonstrated that the original blacksmith who forged it was highly skilled; the experiment found that 85 separately shaped elements were used to create the piece, originally weighing about 38 kilograms. It is estimated to have taken around three years to create.

== See also ==
- Archaeology of Wales
- Celtic art
- Celtic Britons

== Bibliography ==
- Fox, Cyril (October 1939). "The Capel Garmon Firedog". The Antiquaries Journal. 19 (4): 446–448. doi:10.1017/S0003581500095196. ISSN 1758-5309.
- Peate, Iorwerth C. (March 1942). "The Double-ended Fire-dog". Antiquity. 16 (61): 64–70. doi:10.1017/S0003598X0001601X. ISSN 0003-598X.
- "Stunning ironwork firedog uncovered in farmer's field". Museum Wales.
- "Tax bill paid with 2,000-year-old Iron Age fire guard". BBC News. 2011-12-19.
- "Prehistoric Fire-Dog" (PDF). Nature. 143: 552. 1 April 1939.
- "Capel Garmon Firedog". Peoples Collection Wales.
