= Llyn Cerrig Bach =

Lake in Anglesey, Wales, United Kingdom

Coordinates: 53.25885°N 4.540288°W

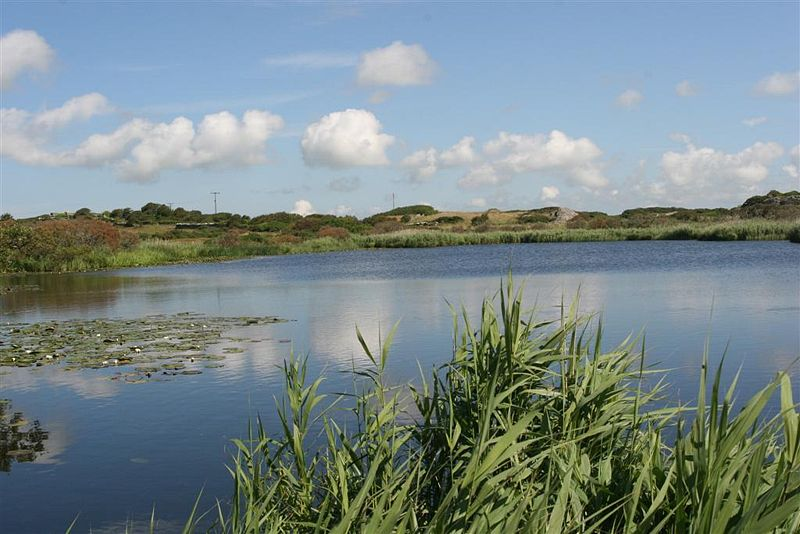
Llyn Cerrig Bach in 2007

Llyn Cerrig Bach is a small lake located between Rhosneigr and Valley in the west of Anglesey, Wales.

Whilst it is not one of the largest lakes on the island (around 1.8 acres), its claim to fame is the group of over 150 Iron Age metal objects discovered there in 1942, apparently placed in the lake as votive offerings. These finds are considered to be one of the most important collections of La Tène style metalwork, or Early Celtic art discovered in the British Isles, and the most important in Wales.

== Archaeological site ==
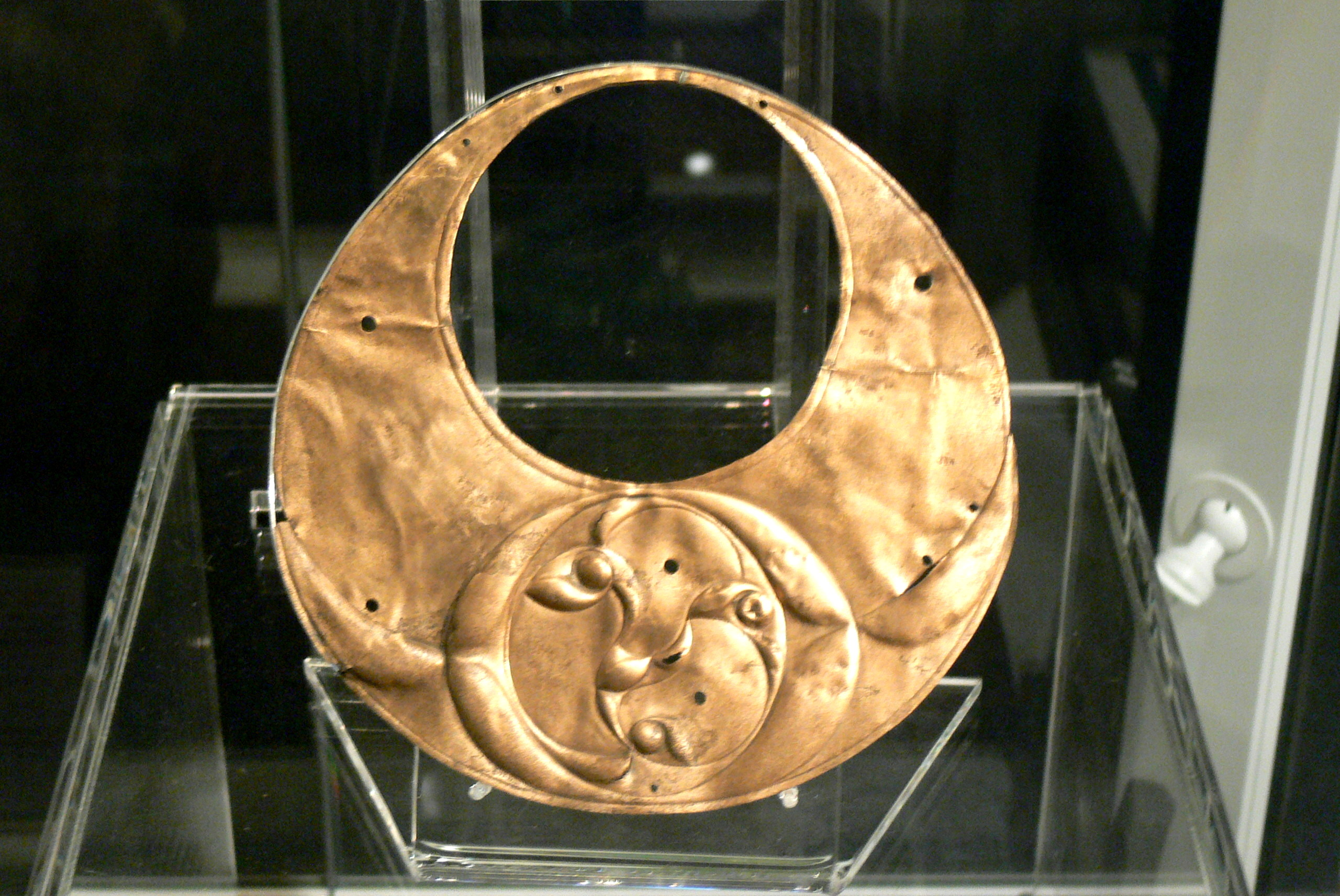
Llyn Cerrig Bach Plaque or "Crescentic bronze plaque" in the shape of a gold lunula, with triskele-like decoration

The discovery was made by William Owen Roberts, head groundsman of RAF Valley, when ground was being cleared for a runway extension. This involved spreading peat over the sandy ground, and the items were discovered during the extraction of peat from the Cors yr Ynys bog on the southern margin of Llyn Cerrig Bach. The first object to be found was an iron gang chain, used for slaves. This was caught up in the teeth of a harrow and was not at first identified as being ancient. It was attached to a tractor and used to pull lorries out of the mud. Despite its age, the chain performed this function well. The slave chain is over 3 metres long, with five neck-rings to hold five captives, and weighs 6.66 kilograms. Cyril Fox argued that the chain was evidence of human sacrifice by Druids as reported by Tacitus who writes that the Roman army landing on Anglesey "urged by their general's appeals and mutual encouragements not to quail before a troop of frenzied women, bore the standards onwards, smote down all resistance, and wrapped the foe in the flames of his own brands. A force was next set over the conquered, and their groves, devoted to inhuman superstitions, were destroyed. They deemed it indeed a duty to cover their altars with the blood of captives and to consult their deities through human entrails."

Once the chain had been identified, a search of the area produced a large number of other objects, mainly of iron but some of bronze or copper alloy. A total of 181 artefacts are known to have been recovered, described by the National Museum as including: "seven swords, six spearheads, fragments of a shield, part of a bronze trumpet, [one further gang chain], fragments of iron wagon tyres and horse gear. In addition, blacksmith's tools, fragments of two cauldrons, iron bars for trading and animal bones were also found."

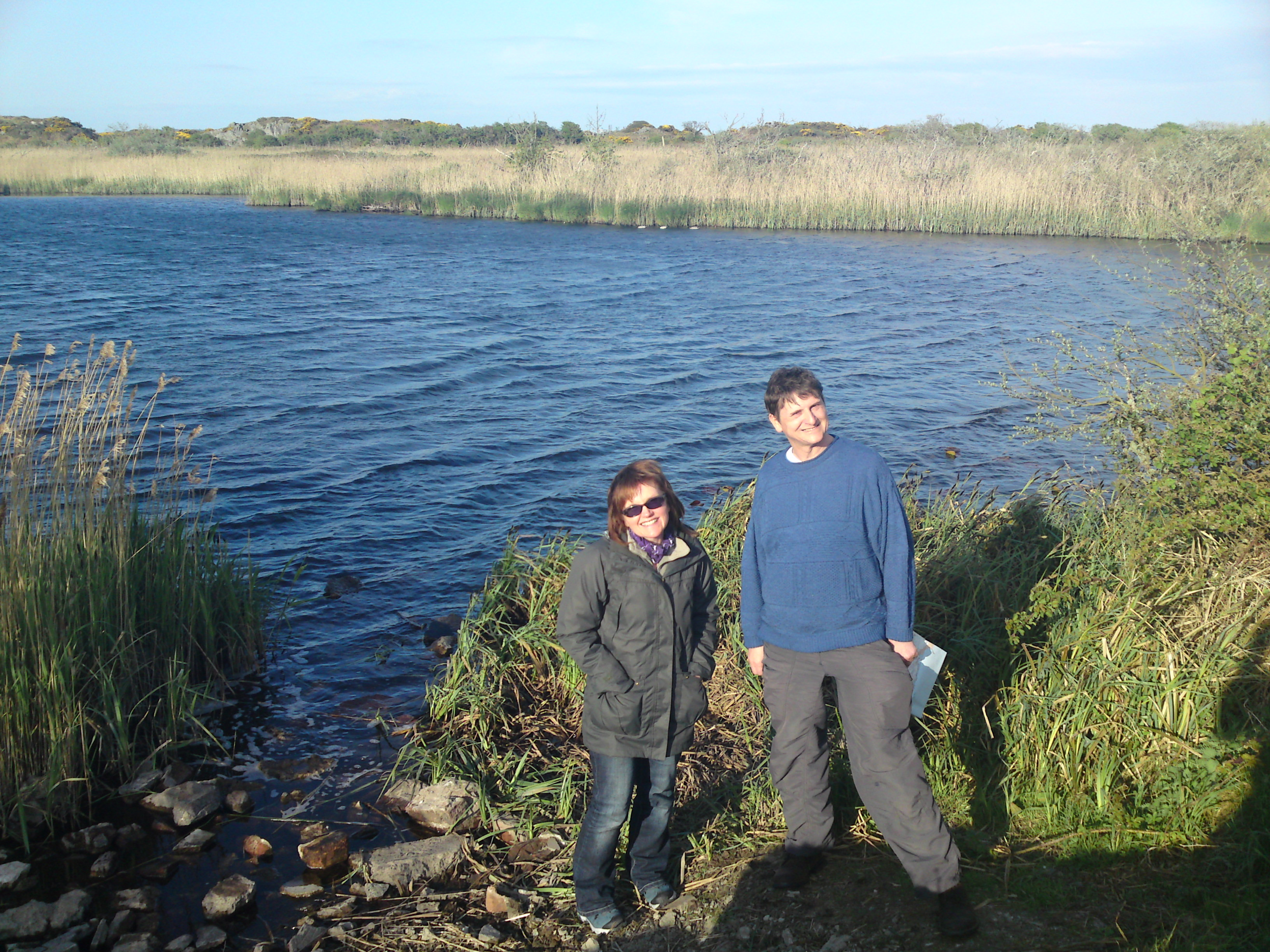
Llyn Cerrig Bach in 2010, view from the roadside

Many of these items had been deliberately broken and are thought to have been placed in the lake as votive offerings. Some of the items appear to have been of local manufacture, a few were manufactured in Ireland, but many originate from southern England, suggesting that the fame of Llyn Cerrig Bach as a holy site may have spread well beyond the immediate area. However it is also possible that they were traded or plunder captured in warfare by the local tribes. No direct Roman influence can be seen on any of the objects found.

A recent re-assessment of the objects now sees them as a collection of different offerings deposited over a long period from about 300 BC to 100 AD, rather than a single group deposited together, as was previously thought. Most of the items found at Llyn Cerrig Bach can usually be seen in the National Museum of Wales in Cardiff, which holds all but four of the objects discovered, although until November 2012 most have been loaned to the Oriel Ynys Môn museum in Anglesey.
