= Register of Landscapes of Historic Interest in Wales =

Welsh heritage register

The Register of Landscapes of Historic Interest in Wales is a non-statutory heritage register of 58 landscapes of outstanding or special historic interest published in two volumes (1998 and 2001). It was produced by a partnership between Cadw, the Countryside Council for Wales, (Note: From 1991 until 2013 (when it became part of Natural Resources Wales) the Countryside Council for Wales was responsible for matters relating to countryside conservation.) and the International Council on Monuments and Sites (ICOMOS UK) working in collaboration with the Welsh Archaeological Trusts (Note: The Archeological Trusts were educational charities and limited companies whose roles included maintaining Historic Environment Records (HERs) on behalf of the Welsh Ministers. In April 2024 they merged under the name Heneb.) and several other organisations with the intention of aiding in the protection and conservation of the most important and significant historic landscape areas in Wales.

== The Register ==
Welsh Archaeological Trusts shown within Wales. Key: 1. Clwyd-Powys; 2. Dyfed; 3. Glamorgan-Gwent; 4. Gwynedd

The register was compiled as part of a joint initiative that involved Cadw, the Countryside Council for Wales (CCW) and the International Council on Monuments and Sites working in collaboration with Welsh unitary authorities, the Royal Commission on the Ancient and Historical Monuments of Wales and the Welsh Archaeological Trusts (WATs). The four trusts, Clwyd-Pows, Dyfed, Glamorgan-Gwent and Gwynedd, each covered an area of Wales based on the 1974 county areas. The first volume of the register, Part 2.1 Register of Landscapes of Outstanding Historic Interest in Wales, (Note: Part 2 because the register is a component of the Register of Landscapes, Parks and Gardens of Special Historic Interest in Wales. Part 1 is the Cadw/ICOMOS Register of Parks and Gardens of Special Historic Interest in Wales) was published in January 1998 and listed 36 "outstanding" landscapes (numbered 1–36 on the list). It was followed in 2001 by a second volume, Part 2.2 Register of Landscapes of Special Historic Interest in Wales, which identified a further 22 landscapes of "special" historic interest (numbers 37–58). These 22 areas of national significance are generally smaller than those of outstanding historic interest identified in the first volume. The CCW website gave five criteria used for identifying the historic landscapes on the register:

1. Landscapes which have been changed in major ways showing human endeavour on a grand scale, including cities, conurbations, industrial areas and civil engineering projects.
2. Landscapes which show change during a particular period and where change has since stopped.
3. Landscapes which show the effect of changes over several periods, including a range of different features or different versions of the same feature.
4. Landscapes where historical evidence has been buried or lost.
5. Landscapes which have 'cultural merit' – through links with important cultural trends or achievements.

The "special" landscapes often match a single criterion, whereas the "outstanding" landscapes may represent one or more of them. Both types are considered to be of equal value in terms quality of historic interest and Cadw notes that the register highlights the best examples, but "does not reduce the importance of the rest of Wales’s rich historic landscape". The distinction between the two volumes has been described as the equivalent of Grade I and II designations used in other Welsh heritage registers, however, the register is non-statutory so, unlike National parks and Areas of Outstanding Natural Beauty, the landscapes have no special protection, though several registered historic landscapes share geographic areas with the protected sites, for example in the Gower Peninsula.

=== Historic landscape characterisation ===
The initial research for the publication of the register was expanded with a further initiative to produce a collection of detailed landscape reports, compiled by the WATs with grant aid from Cadw. This used a process developed by Cadw, the CCW and the WATs known as historic landscape characterisation. The development of this technique included methods introduced through research studies of the Llŷn Peninsula and the Gwent Levels, and it was used to describe geographic areas of historic character based on factors including the range and distribution of surviving archaeological and historical features. The register was aimed at increasing recognition of the value of historic landscapes, and raising awareness of their importance. The register and the reports were seen as the first steps in a larger project of historic landscape characterisation used to identify the characteristics of the areas. The reports are used to inform recommendations for managing, rather than preventing, changes to the landscape, and were complied with the intention that they would be compatible with the CCW's LANDMAP system and could be used to enhance rural initiatives such as the Tir Gofal agri-environment scheme.

== List of registered historic landscapes ==
Key:

- CPAT: Clwyd-Powys Archaeological Trust
- DAT: Dyfed Archaeological Trust
- GGAT: Glamorgan-Gwent Archaeological Trust
- GAT: Gwynedd Archaeological Trust

List of historic landscapes
No.	Name	Reference number	Register type	Archaeological trust	
No.	Name	Reference number	Register type	Trust	HLC report
1	The Vale of Clwyd	HLW (C) 1	Outstanding	CPAT	The Vale of Clwyd
2	Hollywell Common and Halkyn Mountain	HLW (C) 2	Outstanding	CPAT	Holywell Common and Halkyn Mountain
3	Black Mountain and Mynydd Myddfai	HLW (D) 1	Outstanding	DAT	Tywi Valley, Myddfai and Black Mountain
4	Upland Ceredigion	HLW (D) 2	Outstanding	DAT	Upland Ceredigion
5	Milford Haven Waterway	HLW (D) 3	Outstanding	DAT	Milford Haven
6	St Davids Peninsula and Ramsey Head	HLW (D) 4	Outstanding	DAT	St David's and Ramsey Island (Note: The DAT historic landscape area of St David's covers the registered landscapes of St Davids Peninsula and Ramsey Head and Skomer Island)
7	Tywi Valley	HLW (D) 5	Outstanding	DAT	Towy Valley
8	Skomer Island	HLW (D) 6	Outstanding	DAT	Skomer Island
9	Preseli	HLW (D) 7	Outstanding	DAT	Preseli
10	Dolaucothi	HLW (D) 8	Outstanding	DAT	Dolaucothi
11	Taf and Tywi Estuary	HLW (D) 9	Outstanding	DAT	Taf and Tywi Estuary
12	Merthyr Mawr, Kenfig & Margam Burrows	HLW (MGI) 1	Outstanding	GGAT	Merthyr Mawr, Kenfig and Margam Burrows
13	Merthyr Tydfil	HLW (MGL) 2	Outstanding	GGAT	Merthyr Tydfil
14	Lancarfan, Vale of Glamorgan	HLW (SG) 1	Outstanding	GGAT	Llancarfan
15	Gower	HLW (WGL) 1	Outstanding	GGAT	Gower
16	Blaenavon	HLW (Gt) 1	Outstanding	GGAT	Blaenavon
17	Gwent Levels	HLW (Gt) 2	Outstanding	GGAT	The Gwent Levels
18	The Lower Wye Valley	HLW (Gt) 3	Outstanding	GGAT	Lower Wye Valley
19	Amlwch and Parys Mountain	HLW (Gw) 1	Outstanding	GAT	Amlwch
20	Ardudwy	HLW (Gw) 2	Outstanding	GAT	Ardudwy
21	Blaenau Ffestiniog	HLW (Gw) 3	Outstanding	GAT	Ffestiniog (Note: The GAT historic landscape area of the Vale of Ffestiniog covers the registered landscapes of Aberglaslyn and Blaenau Ffestiniog)
22	Lower Conwy Valley	HLW (Gw) 4	Outstanding	GAT	Creuddyn and Arllechwedd (Note: The GAT historic landscape area Creuddyn and Arllechwedd covers registered landscapes of Creuddyn and Conwy, the Lower Conwy Valley, and part of North Arllechwedd)
23	Creuddyn and Conwy	HLW (Gw) 5	Outstanding	GAT	Creuddyn and Arllechwedd
24	Dinorwig	HLW (GW) 6	Outstanding	GAT	Arfon (Note: The GAT historic landscape area of Arfon covers the registered landscapes of Dinorwig, Ogwen Valley, and part of North Arllechwedd)
25	Aberglaslyn	HLW (Gw) 7	Outstanding	GAT	Ffestiniog
26	Lleyn and Bardsey Island	HLW (Gw) 8	Outstanding	GAT	Llŷn
27	Nantlle Valley	HLW (Gw) 9	Outstanding	GAT	Caernarfon and Nantlle
28	Ogwen Valley	HLW (Gw) 10	Outstanding	GAT	Arfon
29	Transfynydd Basin and Cwm Prysor	HLW (Gw) 11	Outstanding	GAT	Trawsfynydd
30	North Arllechwedd	HLW (Gw) 12	Outstanding	GAT	Arfon and Creuddyn and Arllechwedd
31	Vale of Dolgellau	HLW (Gw) 13	Outstanding	GAT	Dolgellau
32	Mawddach	HLW (Gw) 14	Outstanding	GAT	Mawddach
33	Penmon	HLW (Gw) 15	Outstanding	GAT	Penmon
34	Tanat Valley	HLW (P/C) 1	Outstanding	CPAT	The Tanat Valley
35	Vale of Montgomery	HLW (P) 2	Outstanding	CPAT	The Vale of Montgomery
36	Middle Wye Valley	HLW (P) 3	Outstanding	CPAT	The Middle Wye Valley
37	Berwyn	HLW (C) 3	Special	CPAT	Berwyn
38	Lower Elwy Valley	HLW (C) 4	Special	CPAT	The Lower Elwy Valley
39	Denbigh Moors	HLW (C) 5	Special	CPAT	Mynydd Hiraethog
40	Vale of Llangollen and Eglwyseg	HLW (C) 6	Special	CPAT	Vale of Llangollen and Eglwyseg
41	Maelor	HLW (C) 7	Special	CPAT	Maelor Saesneg
42	Drefach and Felindre	HLW (D) 10	Special	DAT	Drefach-Felindre
43	Pen Gaer: Garn Fawr and Stumble Head	HLW (D) 11	Special	DAT	Pencaer
44	Stackpole Warren	HLW (D) 12	Special	DAT	Stackpole Warren
45	Manobier	HLW (D) 13	Special	DAT	Manorbier
46	Lower Teifi Valley	HLW (D) 14	Special	DAT	Lower Teifi Valley
47	Newport and Carningli	HLW (D) 15	Special	DAT	Newport and Carningli
48	East Fforest Fawr and Mynydd-y-Glog	HLW (MGl) 3	Special	CPAT	East Fforest Fawr and Mynydd-y-glôg
49	Gelli-Gaer Common	HLW (MGl) 4	Outstanding (Note: Although it appears at 49 on the index, the Cadw report gives the register type as Outstanding)	GGAT	Gelligaer
50	The Rhondda	HLW (MGl) 5	Special	GGAT	The Rhondda
51	Margam Mountain	HLW (WGl/MGl) 2	Special	GGAT	Margam Mountain
52	Clydach George	HLW (Gt) 4	Special	GGAT	Clydach George
53	Bala and Bala Lakesides	HLW (Gw) 16	Special	GAT	Bala and Llyn Tegid
54	Dysynni Valley	HLW (GW) 17	Special	GAT	Dysynni
55	Elan Valley	HLW (P) 4	Special	CPAT	The Elan Valley
56	Caersws Basin	HLW (P) 5	Special	CPAT	The Caersws Basin
57	Clywedog Valley	HLW (P) 6	Special	CPAT	The Clywedog Valley
58	Middle Usk Valley: Brecon and Llangorse	HLW (P) 7	Special	CPAT	Middle Usk Valley: Brecon and Llangorse

== Documents ==
- Register of landscapes of outstanding historic interest in Wales. Cadw. 1998. ISBN 185760007X.
- Register of landscapes of special historic interest in Wales. Cadw. 2001. ISBN 1857601874.
