= County archaeologist =

Role in local government in the United Kingdom

A county archaeologist is a local government employee in the United Kingdom responsible for overseeing development-led archaeological investigations as required by PPG16. Nominated as the archaeological advisor by each local planning authority, the County Archaeologist recommends which developments are likely to threaten archaeological sites, and advises methods of mitigating their impact, usually through the imposition of planning conditions. The role developed in the 1970s in response to damage done to Britain's archaeological resources in the 1960s.

Other responsibilities include maintaining the Sites and Monuments Record, managing the Portable Antiquities Scheme, education and outreach activities and co-ordinating research agendas. It has become more common for this position to lead a team or staff in carrying out their responsibilities in these areas.

In London the County Archaeologist's role is filled by English Heritage except in Southwark and The City.

== See also ==
- Association of Local Government Archaeological Officers
