= Archaeology of Wales =

Study of human occupation in Wales

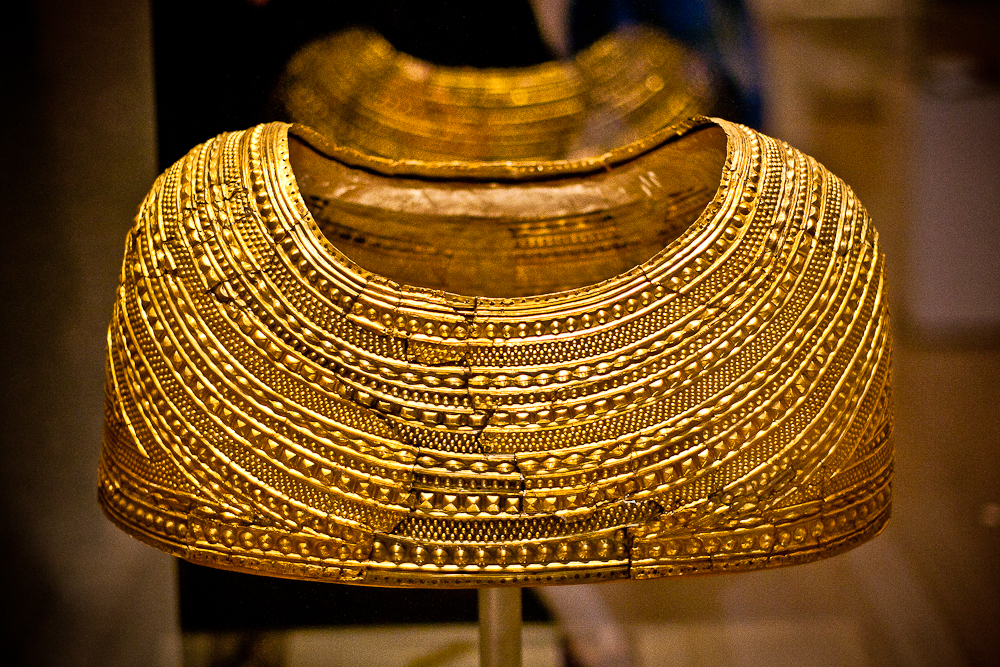
The Mold gold cape, which is a Bronze Age gold cape from Wales dating to 1900–1600 BC. It is now in the British Museum.

The archaeology of Wales (Welsh: Archaeoleg Cymru) is the study of human occupation within the country of Wales which has been occupied by modern humans since 225,000 BC, with continuous occupation from 9,000 BC. Analysis of the sites, artefacts and other archaeological data within Wales details its complex social landscape and evolution from Prehistoric times to the Industrial period. This study is undertaken by academic institutions, consultancies, charities as well as government organisations.

== Timeline ==
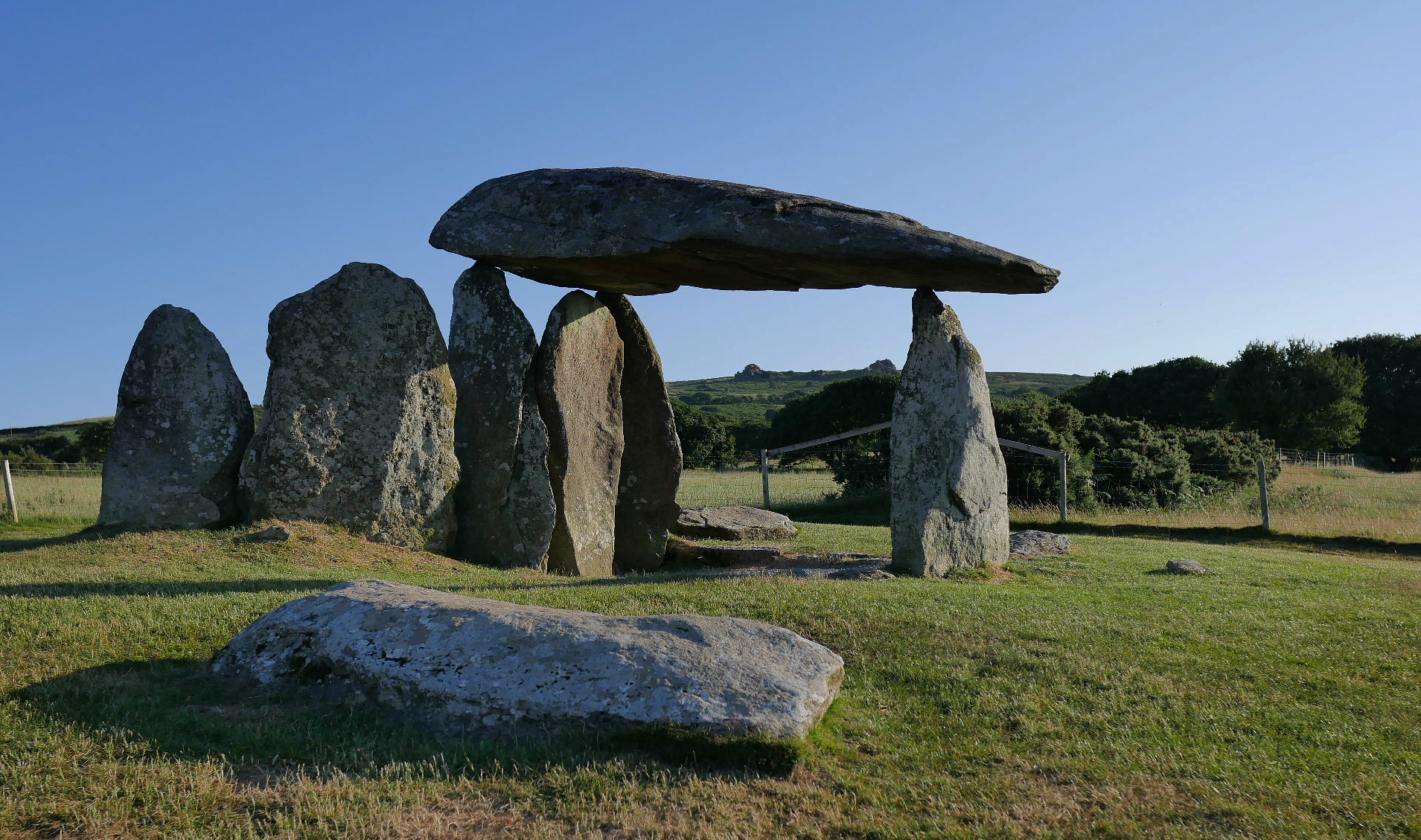
Pentre Ifan, Neolithic dolmen in Wales.

=== Ancient Wales ===
In Palaeolithic times evidence of human activity is scant; this is due in part to geological factors, with deposits being washed away or overridden. From the surviving evidence, human occupation can still be determined, with significant artefacts such as the Red Lady of Paviland, discovered in 1823. Its original discovery resulted in many false theories about its origin, but subsequent re-examinations using increasingly sophisticated technology led to "The Red Lady" (now known to be a male skeleton) being confirmed as the oldest skeleton of a modern human to be discovered in the UK, dating back 33–34,000 years according to Oxford University's Museum of Natural History.

There is greater Neolithic evidence, including the 150 cromlechs found throughout Wales and dolmens such as Pentre Ifan. Settlements are also present in the archaeological record, with a Neolithic neighbourhood in Llanfaethlu being the possible "earliest village" in Wales. Evidence of mining industry is also evident: a Neolithic quarry was recently discovered in St. Dyfnog’s Well.

=== Bronze Age Wales ===
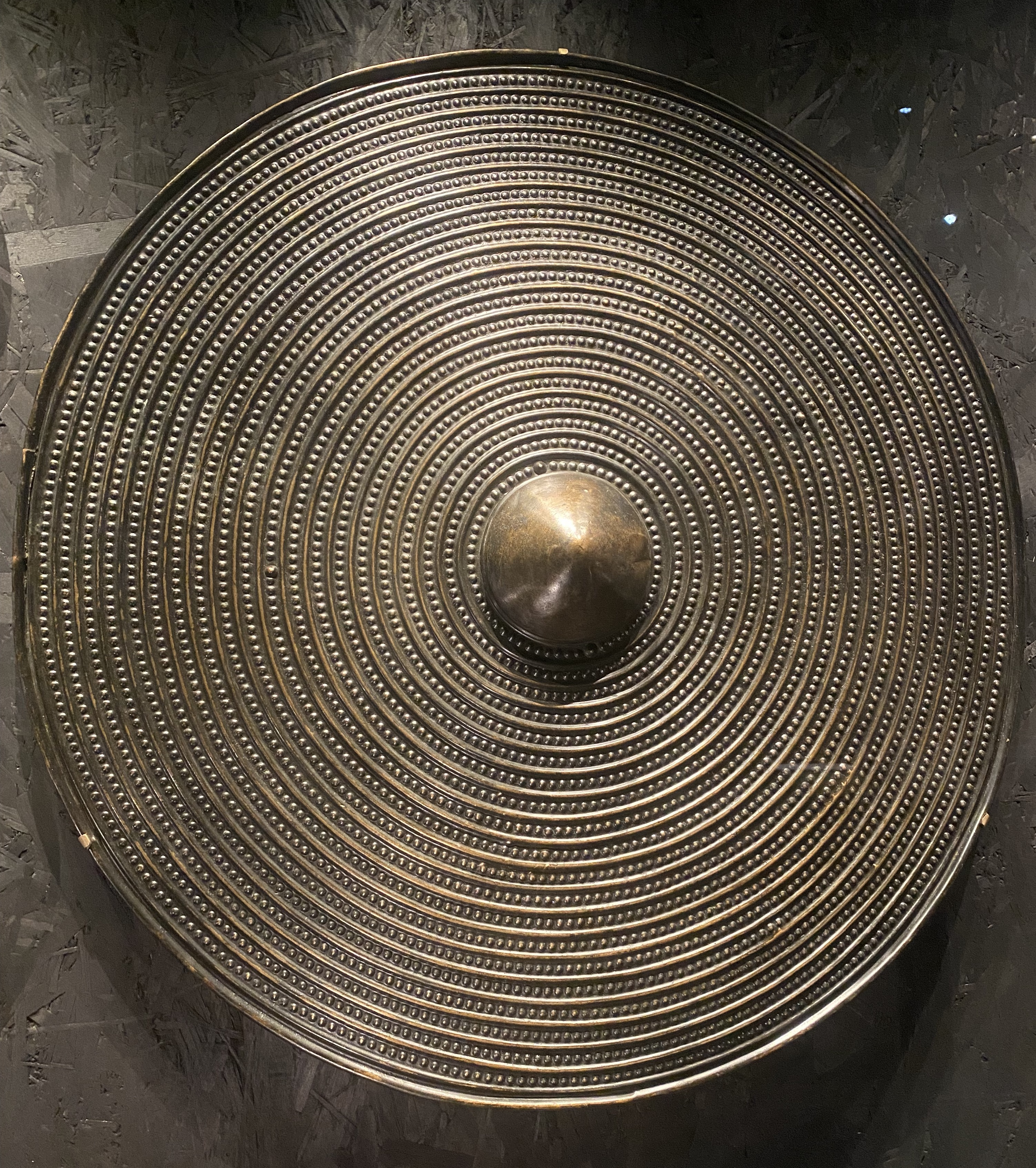
Rhyd-y-Gors Shield. Wales, 1300-1000 BC. On display at the British Museum.

The Rhyd y Gors shield is large beaten copper alloy shield 67 cm wide dating from the 12th to the 10th century BC, which is currently held in the British Museum. The shield has twenty concentric ribs alternating with rows of bosses. The shield was discovered at Rhyd y Gors, Ceredigion and was donated to the British Museum by Sir Augustus Wollaston Frank in 1873. This shield is an example of early Bronze Age copper alloy use. The Llanwrthwl gold hoard including multiple Celtic golden torcs was discovered on 21 February 1954 in Case- gwyllt Bank on Talwrn Farm in Llanwrthwl. Two golden torcs were found under two small stones below a very large stone of approximately 100 kg nearer the surface. Beneath the upper two torcs was another small stone above another two golden torcs. The marker stone suggests that these torcs were hidden with the intent of later retrieval. Almost 5 years later, a middle Bronze Age gold ring was discovered around 2.5 km away.

Around 2000 BCE the use of bronze to make tools became common in Wales, superseding copper. During this period, the greatest archaeological evidence of human activity is through artefacts and burial sites, rather than settlement sites. These artefacts include many metalwork hoards, such as the Broadward hoard. Such artefacts also demonstrate the metallurgical capacities present in Bronze Age Wales, such as the sheet-gold working on the Mold Cape. This industry is also seen at the Great Orme, where copper was mined in the largest Bronze Age mine in the world.

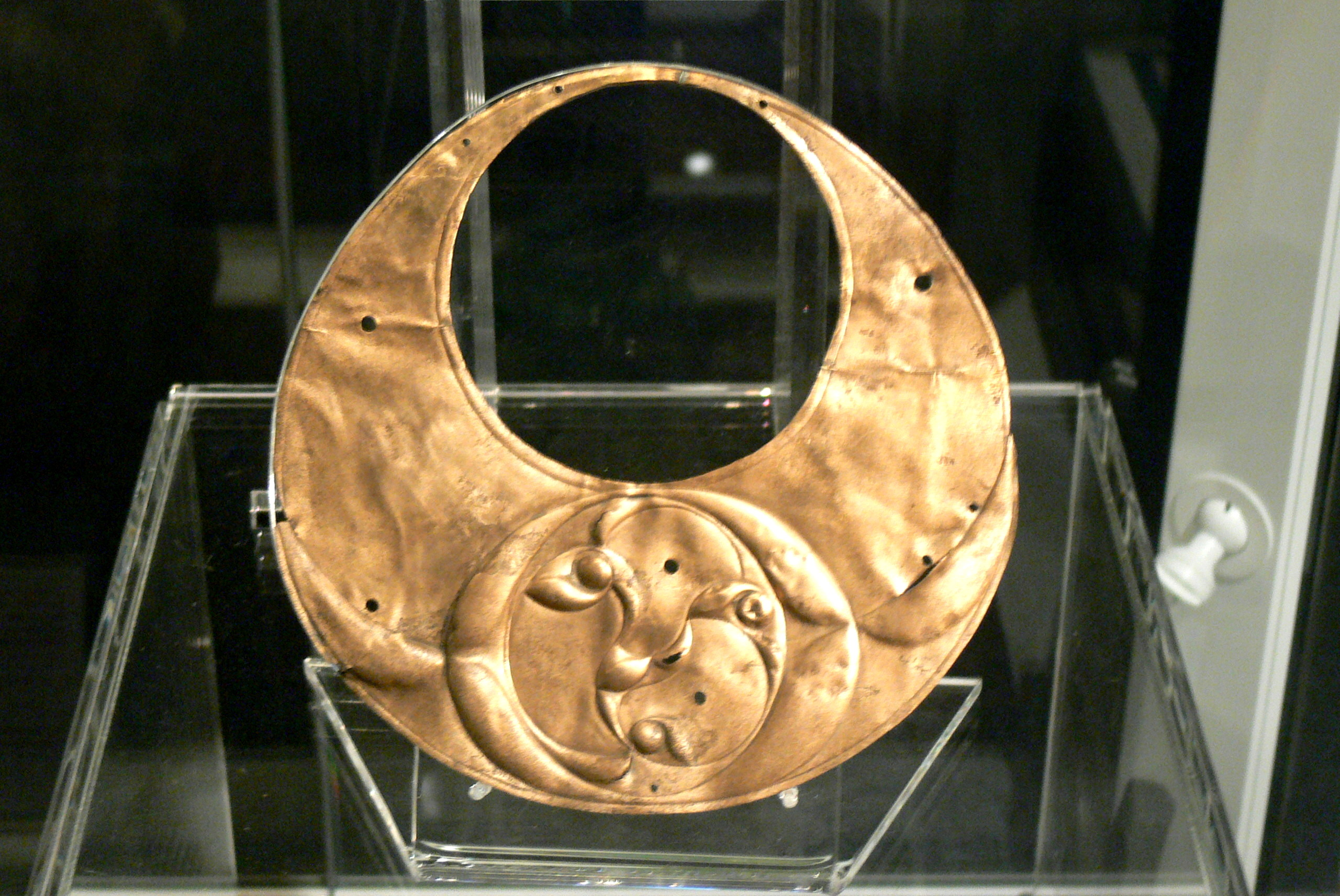
Llyn y Cerrig Bach Plaque dating from the Iron Age. National Museum of Wales.

=== Iron Age Wales ===
Iron Age Wales, from 800 BCE to 74 CE, has not been subject to as extensive archaeological excavations as other periods. Evidence for the period comes predominantly from settlement and hillfort sites, as well as status items; but artefacts relating to local societies and domestic life are scarce. Of current findings, there is evidence of an elite warrior class as well as cross-cultural contact The use of Celtic symbolism such as the Triskele existed in the Iron Age in Wales. One of the best examples of this is the crescentic plaque discovered at Llyn y Cerrig Bach in Anglesey. This symbol is thought to represent a triple limb and is considered by some to represent earth, wind and water. The triskele symbol of this particular artefact was beaten into the metal from the reverse side of the plaque. The exact purpose of this plaque is unclear; however, it seems decorative and may have been used to adorn a chariot, a shield, or even a musical instrument. This artefact remains an important example of Celtic symbolism in Wales.

A Bronze reign guide from a Celtic chariot dating to 50–80 CE was discovered near Pentyrch in 1965. Celtic chariots were a sign of high status and this type of bronze work with red glass was also discovered in 2018 in Llanstadwell, with the first-ever Celtic chariot burial found in southern Britain. It is possible these chariots were used to battle against Romans by the Celts in Wales.

=== Roman Wales ===
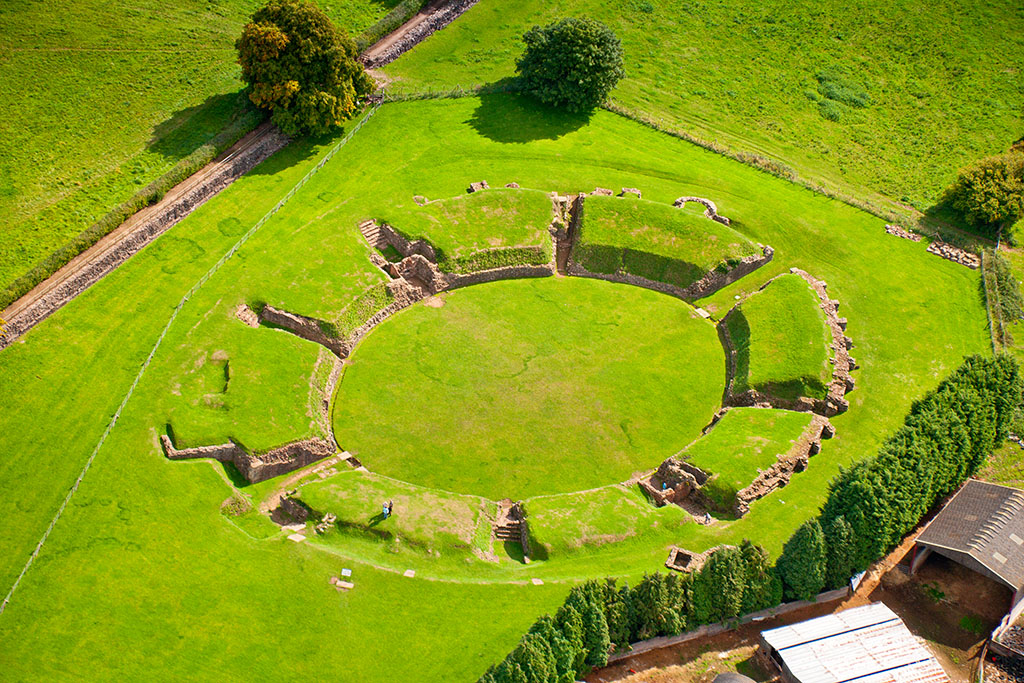
Aerial view of the Roman amphitheatre of Caerleon, near Newport.

Wales was occupied by Rome from 78 CE, leaving many sites throughout Wales that have since been excavated. After conquering the local Celtic tribes of Deceangli, the Ordovices and the Silures, control was solidified through military strength, social assimilation and fortified infrastructure. This includes the South Wales town of Caerleon, known in Roman times as Isca Augusta, with prominent sites such as military barracks, baths, and one of the best-preserved amphitheatres in Britain. Existing settlements in Wales were also subject to romanisation, with the population at Tre’r Ceiri, where many Roman artefacts have been found, growing during the Roman occupation. Mining also occurred in Roman times, for example in Carmarthenshire, where archaeological fieldwork and excavation have established complex gold mining.

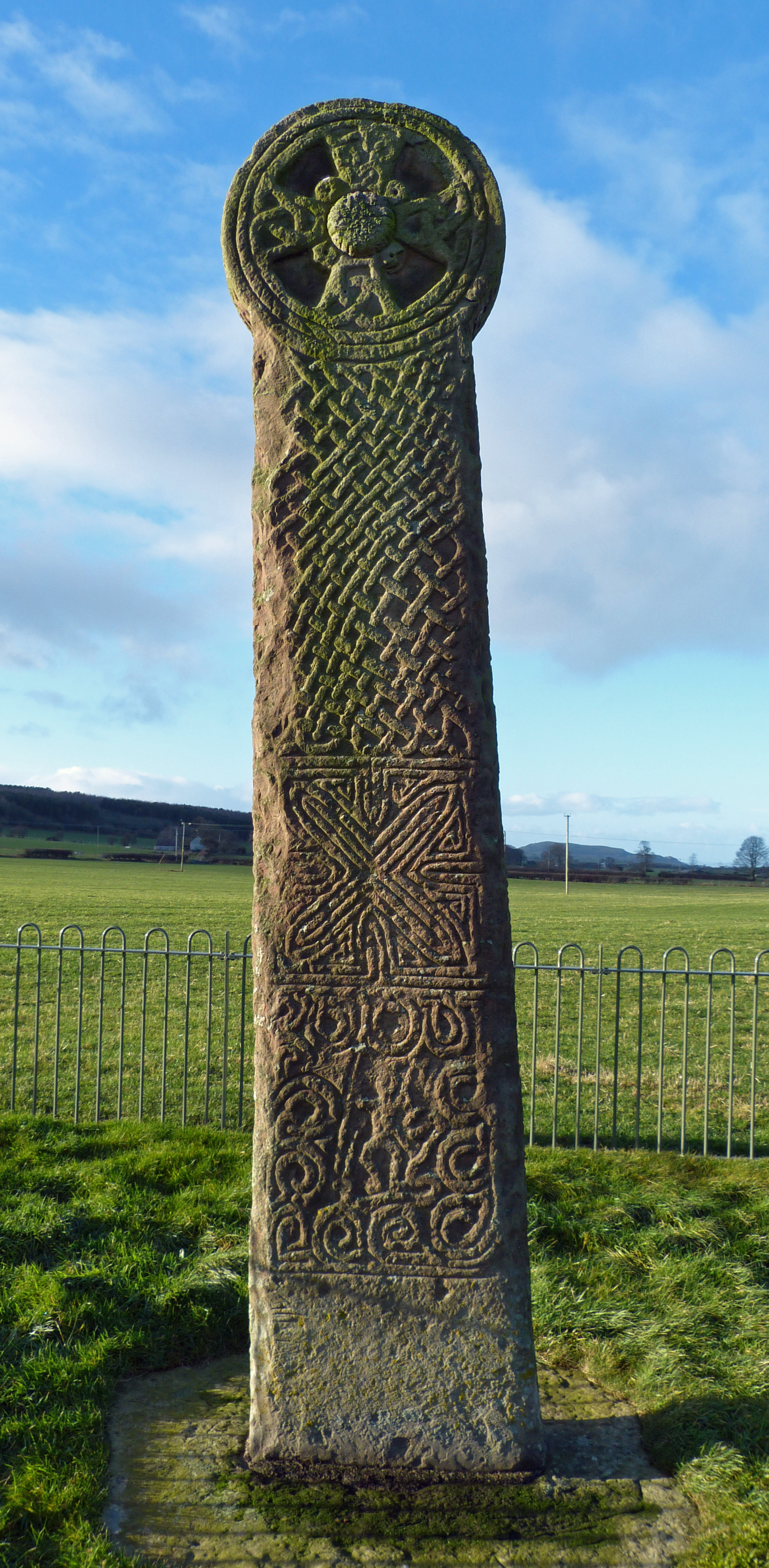
Maen Achwyfan (probably 10th century).

=== Medieval Wales ===
The large-scale occupation of Wales by England in the Medieval period is reflected in the archaeological record, particularly in the political architecture of castles. Wales has over 600 castles, many in stone built by the English during or following the Norman conquest. It is consequently known to many as the castle capital of the world. During that period the various Kingdoms of Wales and later the Principality of Wales formed, both leaving significant archaeological remains. There were also Vikings raids in Wales throughout the Medieval period, particularly in coastal areas. Archaeological evidence also establishes non-violent interaction between the Norse and Welsh peoples, such as the Viking settlement at Llanbedrgoch. A Viking sword guard was found underwater in Smalls Reef, Pembrokeshire Coast which dates to 1100-1125 CE. This guard is archaeological evidence of Viking influence and presence on the Pembrokeshire coast.

Artefacts from the medieval period also show evidence of Celtic Christianity. Augustine become the bishop of Canterbury in 590 AD, however, St Illtud was already spreading Christianity in Celtic Wales, perhaps very soon after Roman departure in 383 AD. Celtic Christian stone crosses are now held within the 13th century Galilee chapel at St Illtud's church in Llanilltud Fawr (Llantwit Major) and are thought to date from the 8th to 10th centuries. Perhaps the most famous Celtic cross in Wales and the tallest wheel cross in Britain is the Maen Achwyfan (Stone of (Saint) Cwyfan) which most likely dates from the 10th century. This monument contains Celtic- and Norse-influenced carvings of an armed warrior and is considered nationally important in the story of Christianity in Wales.

=== Early Modern Period ===
A gold ring with the image of a skull was discovered in Carreghofa, Powys in 2019. According to the National Museum of Wales, this ring is a memento more and is a reminder of the inevitability of death and also signifies the high mortality rates during this period (dated 1550–1650) compared to the modern-day.

=== Industrial Wales to Present ===
Wales had a 400 year period of industrialisation, including major industries of stone quarrying, coal and metal mining and smelting among others. These industries have left tangible archaeological remains, such as the Llangollen Canal in North Wales which was used to transport raw materials as well as other products from Wales into England. Many sites from this time are highly preserved, with some such as Blaenavon and Llanberis now housing industrial museums.

== Notable sites ==
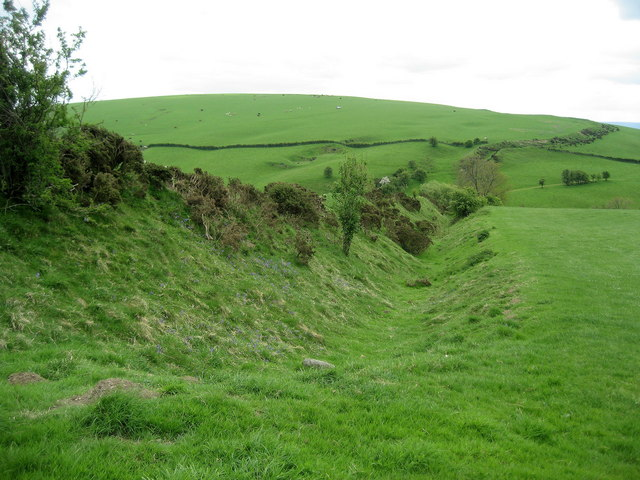
Offa's Dyke, near Clun

Pentre Ifan, a Neolithic cromlech, is symbolic of Welsh heritage, and is called one of Wales' most well known prehistoric monuments.

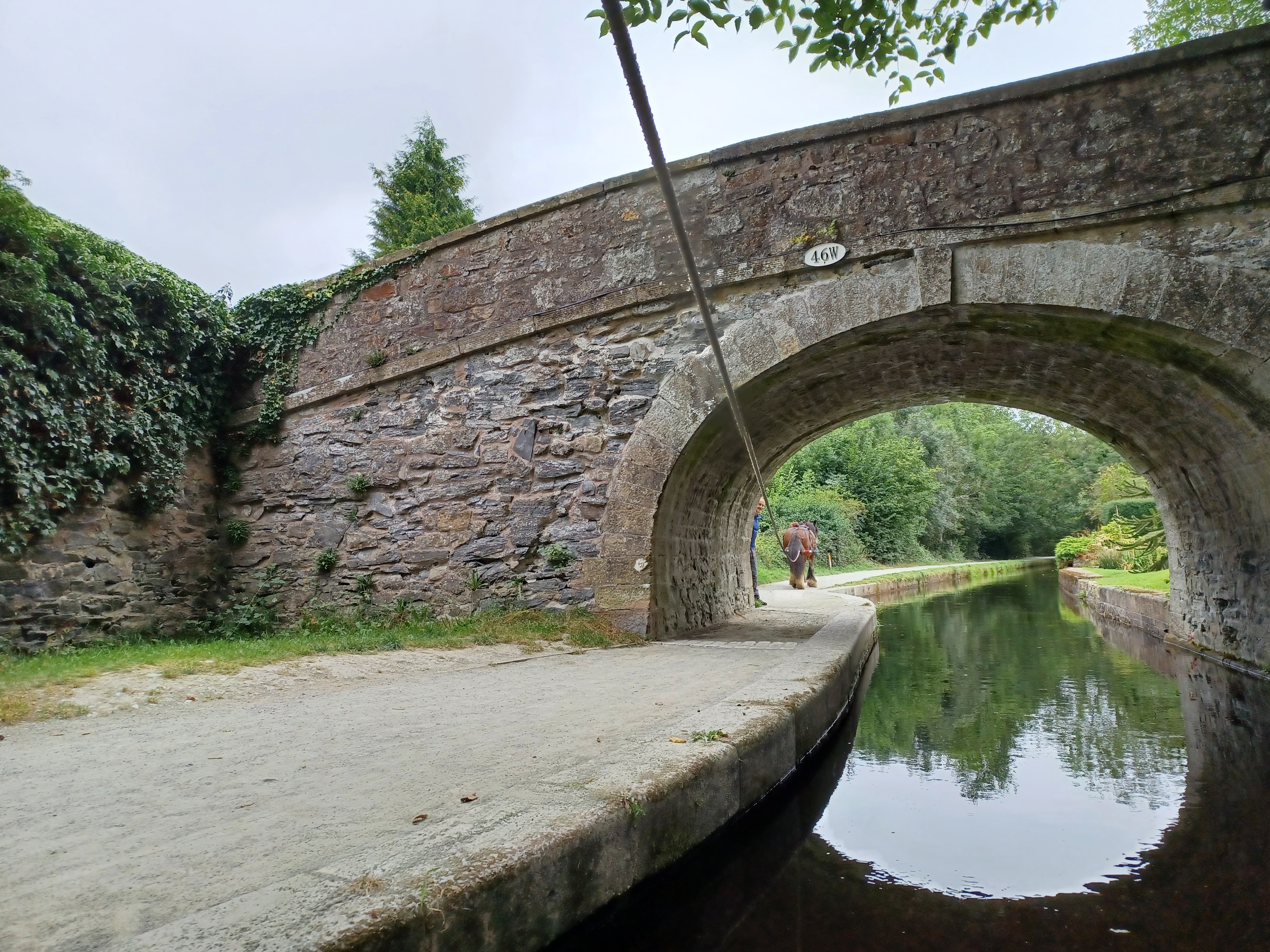
Llangollen Canal. A barge is being pulled by a horse.

The site has been studied since 1603 and was likely a communal burial site and sacred space throughout its use. In Anglesey, the Neolithic site of Bryn Celli Ddu, which consists of a henge and chambered tomb, is also frequently visited.

A notable Bronze Age site is the Great Orme Copper Mines, which had the capacity to produce nearly 2,000 tons of bronze as the largest mine of its time currently known in the world. The site was used throughout the Bronze Age before production ceased, and was also briefly mined in the Roman period. The copper produced was used to make bronze objects which were then traded and dispersed throughout Europe.

The iron age fort of Tre'r Ceiri is one of the best-preserved and most intact sites of its kind within the UK. Over time it has been the focus of intense archaeological study, with the earliest evidence for a human occupation being a Bronze Age cairn. The site was occupied during Roman times, with large amounts of Roman artefacts being excavated. Occupation ended in the 4th century CE; however, the site is still a major tourist destination.

There are several prominent Roman sites that have been excavated in Wales. In North Wales, Segontium, near Caernarfon, is of note: it is the largest Roman fort in the area and a big tourist attraction. The site also includes a temple and town. Isca Augusta, modern Caerleon, is a similar military site and is also the location of the National Roman Legion Museum. Another site, Venta Silurum, demonstrates the best-preserved Roman defensive walls within the UK.

Offa's Dyke, a medieval earthwork created as a demarcation border between England and Wales, and its route is now followed by a popular long-distance path. Other popular medieval sites include Tintern Abbey, Carreg Cennen, and the castles at Conwy, Caerphilly, Caernarfon, Cardiff and Pembroke.

There are four UNESCO World Heritage Sites relating to archaeology within Wales, meeting UNESCO's criteria of Outstanding Universal Value: Pontcysyllte Aqueduct and Canal, The Castles and Town Walls of King Edward in Gwynedd, the Slate Landscape of Northwest Wales and Blaenavon Industrial Landscape. The "Castles and Town Walls of King Edward" includes a number of medieval sites, while Pontcysyllte, the Slate Quarries and Blaenavon are examples of industrial sites, with the Big Pit National Coal Museum at Blaenavon hosting 113,324 visitors in 2019–2020.

== Institutions ==
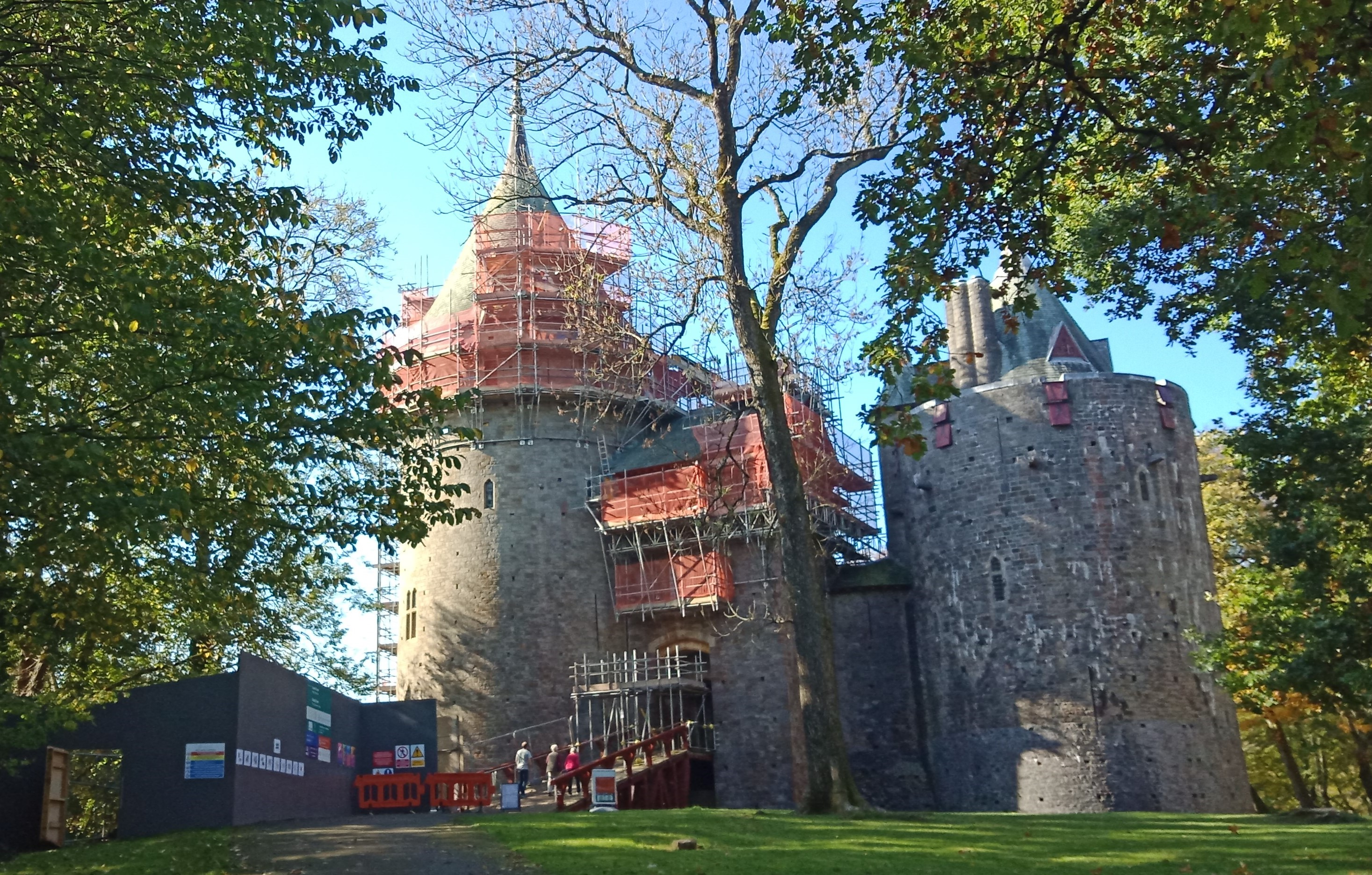
Restoration of Castell Coch in 2018 by Cadw

There are many institutions involved with archaeology in Wales. The dominant institutions form a 'tripod' for protecting, recording and understanding archaeology and cultural heritage: these are Cadw, the Royal Commission on the Ancient and Historical Monuments of Wales (RCAHMW), and the four Welsh Archaeological Trusts.

Cadw is the government agency responsible for the historic environment of Wales, involved with caring for and maintaining historic sites while also encouraging public access and engagement. They are also responsible for promoting archaeological research throughout Wales, such as their support for excavations at Dryslwyn Castle. The Royal Commission on the Ancient and Historical Monuments of Wales (RCAHMW) is another government body, which by Royal Warrant collects, maintains and distributes archaeological and historic information in addition to its responsibilities regarding national standards on these topics. The four Welsh Archaeological Trusts are independent charities that deliver some services that in other parts of the UK are delivered by central or local government: they are the Clwyd-Powys Archaeological Trust, the Dyfed Archaeological Trust, the Glamorgan-Gwent Archaeological Trust and the Gwynedd Archaeological Trust; each trust focuses on their its respective region to help manage, research, promote and educate the public about archaeology.

Other charities include the Council for British Archaeology Wales Cymru which is the Welsh branch of a UK wide charity, involved in supporting archaeologists and promoting heritage in Wales, such as through their initiative. the Young Archaeologists Club. Another notable charity is the Cambrian Archaeological Association, which studies and educates on Welsh archaeology as well as publishing a yearly journal, Archaeologia Cambrensis.

Universities in Wales that offer courses on archaeology include the University of Wales Trinity Saint David, Bangor University, Swansea University, Aberystwyth University and Cardiff University

== Return of artefacts to Wales ==
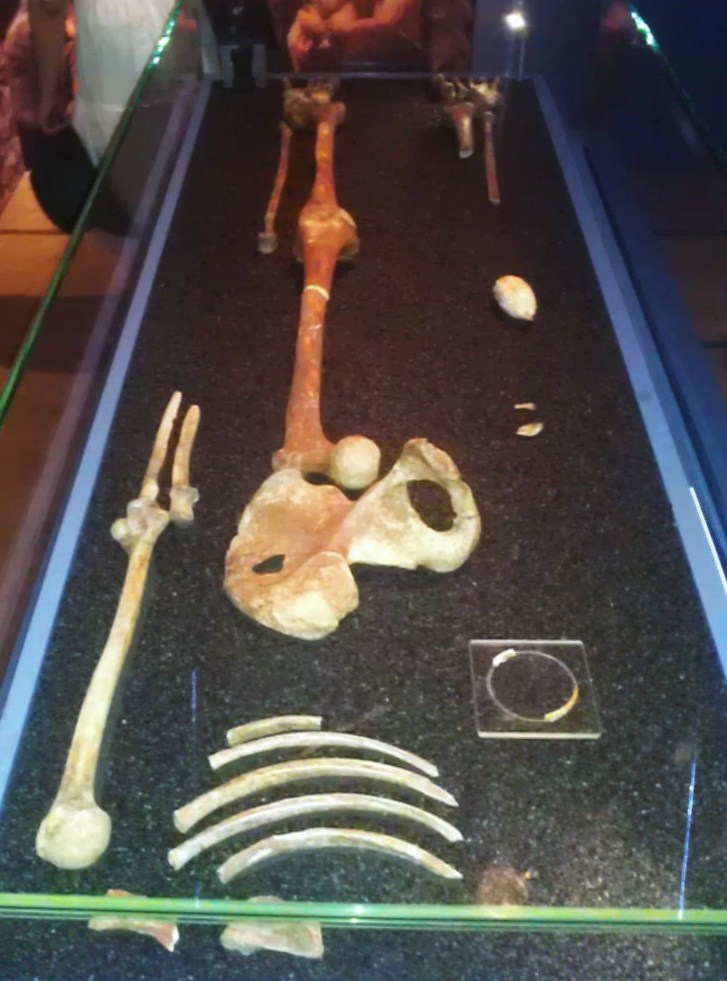
Palaeolithic human remains from the Red Lady of Paviland, excavated in South Wales. The image was taken when they were exhibited at the Natural History Museum in Summer 2014.

There have been calls in Welsh media to return some of the more significant artefacts back to Wales from English museums. These artefacts include the Mold Cape, Llanllyfni lunula, Rhos Rydd shield, Moel Hebog shield and Welsh buckler shields from the British museum in London. The Red Lady of Paviland (currently in Oxford) Trawsfynydd Tankard (currently in Liverpool) have also been identified as items for return to Wales.

== Public engagement ==
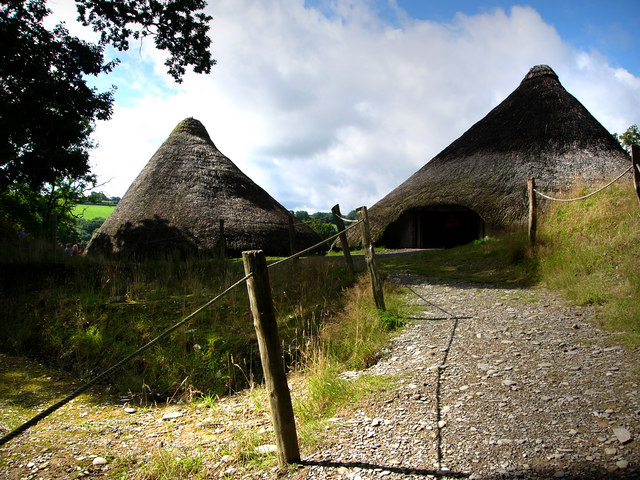
Recreated roundhouses at Castell Henllys

Around Wales, a variety of museums, organisations and charities help promote archaeology to the public. This includes access to many sites, monuments and museums, such as the 121 sites Cadw manages. Public engagement is also encouraged by re-enactment and living history demonstrations and museums, such as Castell Henllys, a reconstructed Iron Age hillfort, and the St Fagans Folklore Museum, which recreates various aspects of Welsh history, with the latter receiving 683,613 visitors in 2018/19. Similar sites include Cosmeston Medieval Village, a 14th-century living history museum. Accessibility is also improved with free online heritage databases, such as Coeflin or Archwilio, run by the Royal Commission on the Ancient and Historical Monuments of Wales and the Welsh Archaeological Trusts respectively.

The Council for British Archaeology hosts a Festival of Archaeology, which includes events in Wales. Other organisations have also hosted archaeological days, such as the Pembrokeshire Coast National Park Archaeology Day.

Volunteer community projects also encourage public engagement in archaeology throughout Wales. These are mainly delivered by the Welsh Archaeological Trusts and partner organisations. Examples are:

- the Chirk Castle Community Archaeology Project run by the Clwyd-Powys Archaeological Trust and the National Trust with funding from Cadw
- the excavations at St Patrick's Chapel by the Dyfed Archaeological Trust and the University of Sheffield with support from Cadw, the Nineveh Charitable Trust and Pembrokeshire Coast National Park Authority
- the North-East Wales Community Archaeology projects run by the Clwyd-Powys Archaeological Trust with funding from Cadw
- the Dinas Dinlle hillfort excavations being undertaken by the Gwynedd Archaeological Trust and the RCAHMW with funding from the EU 'CHERISH' project

== List of archaeologically related museums ==
- Big Pit National Coal Museum
- Blaenavon Ironworks
- Caerleon Roman Fortress and Baths
- Castell Henllys
- Ceredigion Museum
- Cosmeston Medieval Village
- Dolaucothi Gold Mines
- Gower Heritage Centre
- Kidwelly Industrial Museum
- Llancaiach Fawr
- National Museum Cardiff
- National Roman Legion Museum
- National Waterfront Museum
- Radnorshire Museum
- Rhondda Heritage Park
- Segontium
- St Fagans National Museum of History
- Strata Florida Abbey
- Swtan Heritage Museum
- Sygun Copper Mine
- Tenby Museum and Art Gallery
- Y Gaer
