= Clwyd-Powys Archaeological Trust =

Welsh archaeological charity (1975–2024)

- Map of Wales showing the area covered by the Clwyd-Powys Archaeological Trust
- Abbreviation: CPAT
- Successor: Heneb
- Formation: 1975
- Dissolved: April 1, 2024; 2 years ago
- Legal status: Independent non-profit research and education body
- Purpose: To educate the public in archaeology
- Region served: United Kingdom
- Website: https://www.cpat.org.uk/

The Clwyd-Powys Archaeological Trust (CPAT; Welsh: Ymddiriedolaeth Archeolegol Clwyd-Powys; YACP) was an educational charity, the objective of which was ‘to advance the education of the public in archaeology’. CPAT was established in 1975 and dissolved in 2024, when it merged with the three other Welsh Archaeological Trusts (WATs) to create Heneb: the Trust for Welsh Archaeology.

== History ==
CPAT was established in 1975 along with three other Welsh Archaeological Trusts. It emerged from the ‘Rescue Archaeology Group’ (RAG) which was set up in 1970 by Chris Musson, who became the first Chief Executive of CPAT. The Trust undertook pioneering work on prehistoric sites in mid-Wales, beginning with the excavation of the Breidden hillfort (Powys) which was being destroyed by quarrying. This was followed by the excavation of a late Iron Age hillslope enclosure at Collfryn (Powys), which found evidence for intensive occupation and remodelling of the site, including round-houses and ‘four-poster’ structures that were probably granaries. CPAT has also undertaken extensive excavations of medieval sites such as Offa's Dyke and Hen Domen, near Montgomery.

CPAT and the other Welsh Archaeological Trusts were pioneers in developing Historic Environment Records (HERs). In the 1970s Wales was the first part of the UK to develop a fully national system of what were then called ‘Sites and Monuments Records’; this fully computerised system was pioneered by Don Benson who was then Chief Executive of the Dyfed Archaeological Trust. During the 1980s there had been good support from government for archaeology, including from Cadw which had been established in 1984. However, with the decline of the Manpower Services Commission funding models began to shift to a more ‘development driven’ model during this period. With the rise of planning-related archaeology in the 1990s CPAT evolved to develop commercial ‘contract’ archaeology services, whilst at the same time maintaining the HER, planning services and other public-facing project work.

In the 2010s the main focus of CPAT's fieldwork moved away from large-scale thematic studies of Welsh monuments and landscapes, to more site-specific work undertaken as part of development-led projects. This has led to a wider portfolio of projects across Wales, and in adjacent areas of England. CPAT has also diversified funding and partnerships for public archaeology projects, including long-running and successful partnerships with the National Trust and the Clwydian Range and Dee Valley AONB.

On 1 April 2024 the four Welsh Archaeological Trusts merged to create 'Heneb: the Trust for Welsh Archaeology'. The legal entity 'Heneb' was created by renaming of the Dyfed Archaeological Trust (DAT); it then subsumed the other three Trusts. As a result control of the merged organisation passed to the former Director of DAT, and then subsequently to a new CEO who had been appointed in February 2024. Therefore the role of Director of CPAT was made redundant.

== Operation and organisation ==
The four Welsh Archaeological Trusts formed part of a ‘tripod’ of institutions which help understand, conserve and interpret archaeology and cultural heritage in Wales. The Trust system in Wales was characterised by depth of regional knowledge and expertise, which partly comes from having many different roles in one organisation.

The Clwyd-Powys Archaeological Trust was organised into three principal departments.

- The Historic Environment Advisory Service undertook work that in other parts of the UK are delivered by local authorities or by state heritage bodies. The three key areas of operation were: maintaining the regional Historic Environment Record (HER); providing planning advice for local authorities, developers and other bodies; and undertaking heritage management work for Welsh Government, local authorities, landowners, and others.
- The Education and Outreach team ran a series of events and activities for the general public, providing education about the archaeological history of the region, and also giving an insight into the work of archaeologists. Some of this work was targeted at areas of social and economic exclusion, including recent work in north-east Wales.
- The Field Services team were responsible for the delivery of archaeological projects funded by private- and public-sector bodies. These included historic environment characterisation, site assessment surveys, field evaluation and excavation, and threat-related excavation and survey.

CPAT was a Registered Organisation with the Chartered Institute for Archaeologists.

CPAT was both a limited company (1212455) and a registered charity (508301). It therefore provided publicly-accessible accounts to Companies House and to the Charity Commission in the UK. The governing body was the Board of Trustees, who were voluntary non-executive directors. The Trustees delegated their authority for the day-to-day running of the Trust to the Director (Chief Executive). The third and final Director of CPAT was appointed in 2013.

On 1 April 2024, the Trustees of CPAT resigned and were replaced by the Trustees of Heneb, with CPAT becoming a regional office of the organisation.

=== Notable people ===
- Philip Barker, Chair of the Trust 1984-1991
- Paul Belford, Director of the Trust 2013-2024
- Bill Britnell, Director of the Trust 1986-2013
- Frances Lynch, Chair of the Trust 1991-2017
- Christopher R. Musson, Director of the Trust 1974-1986, and Trustee 2005-2021
- Sian Rees, Chair of the Trust since 2017

== Beacon Ring ==
Since 2008 the Trust owned Beacon Ring, a hillfort on the Long Mountain near Welshpool. The site was purchased to help safeguard the earthworks for the future. In recent years CPAT had undertaken some archaeological excavations on the site. Fieldwork in 2018 and 2019 investigated the ramparts and entrances.

In 2020 a mound at the centre of the site was investigated. Some accounts had suggested that this was a prehistoric burial mound. However excavation found that this was probably the location of the eponymous beacon, almost certainly of post-medieval date. The mound had later been re-used by the Ordnance Survey as a trig point, both in the 19th century Principal Triangulation of Great Britain and subsequently, with the most recent trig point being installed in 1948.

== Notable projects ==
- Breidden hillfort excavations
- Collfryn enclosure excavations
- Walton Basin (Hindwell) excavations
- Roman and later Deeside
- Offa's Dyke and Wat's Dyke
- Four Crosses bypass
- Upland landscapes
- Roman roads
- North-east Wales Community Archaeology

== Dissolution ==
In September 2023, the four Welsh Archaeological Trusts agreed to merge. As part of this process, in November 2023 the Dyfed Archaeological Trust changed its name to Heneb: the Trust for Welsh Archaeology. In April 2024 the other three Welsh Archaeological Trusts joined Heneb: the Trust for Welsh Archaeology. The resulting organisation is a national body, with regional offices.

== See also ==
- Dyfed Archaeological Trust
- Glamorgan-Gwent Archaeological Trust
- Gwynedd Archaeological Trust
- Cadw
- Royal Commission on the Ancient and Historical Monuments of Wales
- Welsh Archaeological Trusts
