= Glamorgan-Gwent Archaeological Trust =

Welsh archaeological charity (1975–2024)

- Map of Wales showing the area covered by the Glamorgan-Gwent Archaeological Trust
- Successor: Heneb
- Formation: 1975
- Dissolved: April 1, 2024; 2 years ago
- Website: www.ggat.co.uk

The Glamorgan-Gwent Archaeological Trust (Welsh: Ymddiriedolaeth Archeolegol Morgannwg-Gwent) was an archaeological organisation established in 1975, until its dissolution in 2024, as part of the merger of the four Welsh Archaeological Trusts, into Heneb.

== Overview ==
The Trust is a charitable company (Registered in Wales, No: 1276976; Registered Charity No. 505609) whose principal objective is to educate the public in archaeology which it achieves by such diverse means as are allowed in its Articles and Memorandum of Association.

It owns, maintains and continually enhances the Regional Historic Environment Record, which includes information on more than 25,000 known archaeological and historic sites and monuments, and is a prime tool for education and research.

The Trust provides an archaeological planning service jointly funded by the Unitary Authorities and Cadw, Currently more than 22,000 planning applications are checked each year for implications to the Historic Environment. Actions are advised to ensure that proper assessments are carried out and appropriate measures implemented to ensure that Historic Environment interests are protected. As a result of potential conflicts of interest this area of work is separately staffed and funded and governed by a Code of Conduct approved by Cadw.

The Trust also provides general advice through its Heritage Management Services to a variety of institutions and organisations including the Forestry Authority, CCW, Statutory Undertakers, the Environment Agency, National Trust, and the Church in Wales. The Trust is also a reporting station for the Portable Antiquities scheme.

The Trust through its Projects teams undertakes assessments, evaluations, surveys, watching-briefs, building recording and excavations in South Wales and elsewhere. It has had extensive involvement with many major developments in the area. In addition Projects staff carry out area wide monument assessment and historic landscape characterisation works with the intention of improving the information and evidence base to support enhanced protection of the historic environment. The Trust has an active commercial archaeology team, based in a separate office in Newport. This is the location of one of the archaeological projects undertaken in Wales - the Newport Ship, which was excavated in 2002.

The Trust has also contributed to developing research agendas through publication of its work. It promotes knowledge and learning about the past through publication, displays, leaflets, lectures and talks and seeks to involve the community of southeast Wales in its work.

The Trust is a Registered Organisation with the Chartered Institute for Archaeologists and requires all employees, whether corporate members of the Institute or not, to adhere to the Institute's Codes and Standards as a condition of employment.

== Notable people ==
- Henry Owen-John, Deputy Director of the Trust 1977-1991
- H.N. Savory, Chair of the Trust 1976-1984
- Andrew Marvell, Director of the Trust since 2004

== Dissolution ==
In September 2023 the four Welsh Archaeological Trusts agreed to merge. As part of this process, in November 2023 the Dyfed Archaeological Trust changed its name to Heneb: the Trust for Welsh Archaeology. In April 2024 the other three Welsh Archaeological Trusts will join Heneb: the Trust for Welsh Archaeology. The resulting organisation will have a pan-Wales overview, whilst maintaining regionally-based operations.

== See also ==
- Clwyd-Powys Archaeological Trust
- Dyfed Archaeological Trust
- Gwynedd Archaeological Trust
- Cadw
- Royal Commission on the Ancient and Historical Monuments of Wales
- Welsh Archaeological Trusts
- Archaeology of Wales
