= Nancy Edwards =

British archaeologist and academic

Professor Nancy Edwards FSA FBA FLSW
- Born: Nancy Margaret Edwards; 8 January 1954 (age 72); Portsmouth, Hampshire, England
- Title: Professor of Medieval Archaeology

Academic background
- Education: Portsmouth High School
- Alma mater: University of Liverpool; Durham University

Academic work
- Discipline: Archaeology
- Sub-discipline: Medieval archaeology Archaeology of Britain; Archaeology of Ireland; Early medieval Wales; Medieval inscribed stones and stone sculpture Early medieval church History of archaeology
- Institutions: Bangor University

Nancy Margaret Edwards, FSA, FBA, FLSW (born 8 January 1954) is a British archaeologist and academic, who specialises in medieval archaeology and ecclesiastical history. From 2008 to 2020, she was Professor of Medieval Archaeology at Bangor University; having retired, she is now emeritus professor.

== Early life and education ==
Edwards was born on 8 January 1954 in Portsmouth, Hampshire, England to David Cyril Bonner Edwards and Ann Edwards. She was educated at Portsmouth High School, an all-girls private school in Southsea, Portsmouth. She then studied archaeology, ancient history, and medieval history at the University of Liverpool, graduating with a Bachelor of Arts (BA) degree in 1976. She undertook postgraduate research in archaeology at Durham University, and completed her Doctor of Philosophy (PhD) degree in 1982. Her doctoral thesis was titled "A reassessment of the early medieval stone crosses and related sculpture of Offaly, Kilkenny and Tipperary".

== Academic career ==
Edwards has spent all her academic career at Bangor University (or its predecessors University College of North Wales and University of Wales, Bangor). She was a lecturer from 1979 to 1992, a senior lecturer from 1992 to 1999, and a reader from 1999 to 2008. In 2008, she was appointed Professor of Medieval Archaeology. She retired in December 2020, and was made emeritus professor.

In addition to her full-time positions at Bangor, Edwards has held a number of temporary visiting appointments. She was a visiting fellow at Clare Hall, Cambridge in 1991 and at All Souls College, Oxford in 2007. She was the O'Donnell Lecturer in Celtic Studies at the University of Oxford in 1999/2000; lecturing on "Early Medieval Stones and Stone Sculpture in Wales: Context and Connections".

Edwards is Chair of the Royal Commission on the Ancient and Historical Monuments of Wales. She also served as the Chair of the Gwynedd Archaeological Trust from 2004 until 2018.

== Personal life ==
In 1983, Edwards married Anthony Huw Pryce. Together they have one son.

== Honours ==
On 4 May 1989, Edwards was elected a Fellow of the Society of Antiquaries of London (FSA). In 2012, she was elected a Fellow of the Learned Society of Wales (FLSW). In July 2016, she was elected a Fellow of the British Academy (FBA), the UK's national academy for the humanities and the social sciences.

== Selected works ==
- Edwards, Nancy; Lane, Alan, eds. (1988). Early medieval settlements in Wales A.D.400–1100: a critical reassessment and gazetteer of the archaeological evidence for secular settlements in Wales. Bangor: U.C.N.W. Research Centre Wales. ISBN 978-0951183410.
- Edwards, Nancy (1990). The archaeology of early medieval Ireland. University of Pennsylvania Press. ISBN 978-0812230857.
- Edwards, Nancy, ed. (1992). The early church in Wales and the west: recent work in early Christian archaeology, history and place names. Oxford: Oxbow Books. ISBN 978-0946897377.
- Edwards, Nancy, ed. (1997). Landscape and settlement in medieval Wales. Oxford: Oxbow Books. ISBN 978-1900188364.
- Redknap, Mark; Edwards, Nancy; Youngs, Susan; Lane, Alan; Knight, J., eds. (2001). Pattern and purpose in insular art: proceedings of the Fourth International Conference on Insular Art, held at the National Museum & Gallery, Cardiff 3–6 September 1998. Oxford: Oxbow Books. ISBN 978-1842170588.
- Edwards, Nancy (2007). A corpus of early medieval inscribed stones and stone sculpture in Wales, Vol II: South-West Wales. Cardiff: University of Wales Press. ISBN 978-0708319635.
- Edwards, Nancy (2013). A corpus of early medieval inscribed stones and stone sculpture in Wales, Vol III: North Wales. Cardiff: University of Wales Press. ISBN 978-0708325506.
