= Gwynedd Archaeological Trust =

Welsh archaeological charity (1974–2024)

- Map of Wales showing the area covered by the Gwynedd Archaeological Trust
- Successor: Heneb
- Formation: 1974
- Dissolved: April 1, 2024; 2 years ago
- Chief Archaeologist: Andrew Davidson
- Website: www.heneb.co.uk

The Gwynedd Archaeological Trust (Welsh: Ymddiriedolaeth Archeolegol Gwynedd) was an archaeological organisation established in 1974, until its dissolution in 2024 as the four Welsh Archaeological Trusts merged as Heneb.

== Overview ==
The organisation was one of four Welsh Archaeological Trusts in Wales.

The trust maintained Historic Environment Records for their area to provide archaeological advice to central government, planning authorities and other public bodies. The Gwynedd Archaeological Trust along with the other Welsh Archaeological Trusts were pioneers in developing Historic Environment Records (HERs). In the 1970s Wales was the first part of the UK to develop a fully national system of what were then called ‘Sites and Monuments Records’; this fully computerised system was pioneered by Don Benson who was then Chief Executive of the Dyfed Archaeological Trust. The Welsh Government is required to maintain HERs as a statutory obligation under the Historic Environment (Wales) Act 2016; these active databases are an essential component of the planning system in Wales.

== Notable people ==
- Andrew Davidson, Director of the Trust 2011-2024
- Nancy Edwards, Chair of the Trust 2004-2018
- A.H.A Hogg, Chair of the Trust 1982-1983
- David Longley, Director of the Trust 1992-2011

== Dissolution ==
In September 2023 the four Welsh Archaeological Trusts agreed to merge. As part of this process, in November 2023 the Dyfed Archaeological Trust changed its name to Heneb: the Trust for Welsh Archaeology. On 1 April 2024 the other three Welsh Archaeological Trusts merged into Heneb: the Trust for Welsh Archaeology. The resulting organisation has a pan-Wales overview, whilst maintaining regionally-based operations.

== See also ==
- Clwyd-Powys Archaeological Trust
- Dyfed Archaeological Trust
- Glamorgan-Gwent Archaeological Trust
- Cadw
- Royal Commission on the Ancient and Historical Monuments of Wales
