= Royal Commission on the Ancient and Historical Monuments of Wales =

Archival institution in Wales

- Commisiwn Brenhinol Henebion Cymru (Welsh)

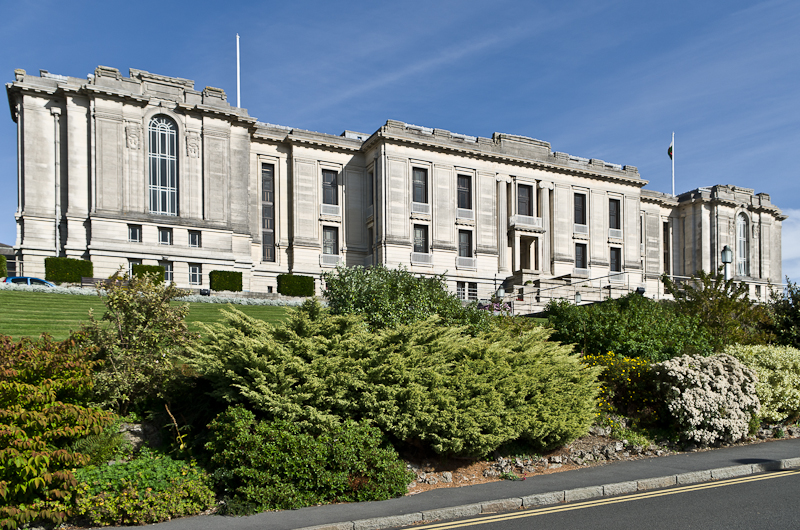
- Co-located at The National Library of Wales, Aberystwyth
- 52°24′52″N 4°4′8″W
- Location: Aberystwyth
- Type: National archives
- Established: 1908
- Reference to legal mandate: Established by Royal Warrant on 10 August 1908

Collection
- Items collected: Printed works, maps, archives, manuscripts, photographs, paintings
- Size: 2M photographs, 530,000 pages of text and reports, 125,000 drawings, 32,000 maps
- Criteria for collection: Acquisition through purchase, bequest and archival deposit
- Legal deposit: Yes

Access and use
- Access requirements: Library open to all

Other information
- Director: Christopher Catling
- Employees: around 30 FTE
- Website: rcahmw.gov.uk

The Royal Commission on the Ancient and Historical Monuments of Wales (RCAHMW; Welsh: Comisiwn Brenhinol Henebion Cymru; CBHC), established in 1908, is a Welsh Government sponsored body concerned with some aspects of the archaeological, architectural and historic environment of Wales. It is based in Aberystwyth.

The RCAHMW maintains and curates the National Monuments Record of Wales (NMRW), an archive with an online platform called Coflein. Professor Nancy Edwards is Chair of the Commissioners.

== Mission statement ==
The Royal Commission has a national role in the management of the archaeological, built and maritime heritage of Wales, as an originator, curator and supplier of information for individual, corporate and governmental decision-makers, researchers and the general public. To this end it:

- Surveys, interprets and records the man-made environment of Wales
- Compiles, maintains and curates the National Monuments Record of Wales
- Promotes an understanding of this information by all appropriate means

The Royal Commission is committed to close partnership working with other organisations in Wales, in particular Cadw and the Welsh Archaeological Trusts.

== History ==
In 1882 Sir John Lubbock pioneered the Ancient Monuments Protection Act 1882. This Act, concerned principally with prehistoric monuments rather than with later, medieval structures, encouraged owners to voluntarily transfer important sites into the safekeeping of Her Majesty's Commissioners of Works. It also discouraged the public from damaging monuments by threatening to impose stiff penalties.

The first Schedule of monuments resulted from a nationwide inquiry among interested local antiquarian societies. In order to add monuments to this Schedule, the First Inspector of Ancient Monuments, General Pitt-Rivers, travelled the British Isles examining the known sites, and searching for new ones. Unfortunately, only limited information was available to him and his helpers about the nature, location and condition of many monuments, and there was no easy way to assess the potential national significance or value of any given site.

In Wales, there were only three monuments on the first Schedule. These were Plas Newydd megalith, Anglesey; Arthur's Quoit, Gower, Glamorgan; and the megalith at Pentre Ifan, Pembrokeshire.

By the turn of the century it was becoming clear that a census of archaeological sites was needed, so that a selection of the best could be put forward for Statutory Protection. Consequently, by 1908 the administrative frameworks were in place to establish individual Royal Commissions on Ancient Monuments separately in Scotland, England and Wales. Significantly, their original remit was to encompass not only Historic Monuments, but also Constructions.

On 10 August 1908 a Royal Commission was authorised and appointed by King Edward VII to "make an inventory of the Ancient and Historical Monuments and Constructions connected with or illustrative of the contemporary culture, civilisation and conditions of life of the people in Wales and Monmouthshire from the earliest times, and to specify those which seem most worthy of preservation". This last injunction was the most urgent purpose of the Commission in the eyes of the legislators, but the inventory was its essential preliminary. The protection of significant sites under the Ancient Monuments Act of Queen Victoria's reign had been severely hampered by a basic lack of knowledge of the country's stock of monuments. So it was felt that an independent and official body was needed to prepare a reliable inventory from which examples could be selected and recommended for statutory protection.

This need was not peculiar to Wales, and in 1908 identical Royal Commissions were established for Scotland and England too.

=== Commissioners ===
The early commissioners were distinguished men (there was no woman) who were notable figures in Welsh cultural life, each with a distinctive contribution to make to the task ahead. Their involvement in such long-established scholarly institutions as the Cambrian Archaeological Association and the Honourable Society of Cymmrodorion proved invaluable to the Royal Commission from the beginning.

For the first four decades of its existence it was based, like other Royal Commissions, in London, which allowed easy access to the British Museum, the Public Record Office and the Cymmrodorion Society, which also had its headquarters in the capital.

The Royal Commission's first chairman was Sir John Rhŷs (died 1915), philologist and professor of Celtic at Oxford University. He oversaw the publication of the first four inventory volumes, which appeared in quick succession: for Montgomeryshire (1911), Flintshire (1912), Radnorshire (1913) and Denbighshire (1914). The second chairman (until his death in 1934) was Sir Vincent Evans. By profession an accountant and journalist, he was a friend of Welsh politicians and a stalwart of eisteddfodau and the Cymmrodorion.

The early commissioners, included Edward Anwyl (died 1914), another philologist, professor of Welsh and Comparative Philology at the University College of Wales, Aberystwyth. Griffith Hartwell Jones (died 1944) was an Anglican clergyman living in Surrey but also chairman of the Honourable Society of Cymmrodorion. Robert Hughes was a former lord mayor of Cardiff, which had recently been created a city. Henry Owen, a lawyer, was a notable Pembrokeshire historian and another leading light of the Cymmrodorion. J. A. (later Sir Joseph) Bradney, who was the pre-eminent historian of Monmouthshire, was appointed a commissioner during the Great War, when he was also a lieutenant-colonel in the militia. The last of these early commissioners to be appointed (in 1920) was John Morris-Jones, poet and professor of Welsh in the University College of North Wales, Bangor.

None of these men were practising archaeologist by the later definition of the term. Two other commissioners, however, included W. E. Llewellyn Morgan, who was on the army retired list, had spent several decades penning field descriptions of monuments; those which he made for the Royal Commission, drawing on his earlier notes, were sufficiently respected to be included in the Pembrokeshire inventory (1925).

Finally, Robert Carr Bosanquet (died 1935) was professor of Classical Archaeology at the University of Liverpool.

The day-to-day work of the new Commission required specialist staff, and its first secretary was Edward Owen. Between 1908 and 1928 he did much to establish the Commission on sound and respected foundations. A reputable historian of Anglesey origins, he was trained as a lawyer and had served, like many a British civil servant, in the India Office, where he supervised the military store accounts and prepared statistical statements for India. As overall editor of the inventories, he was at pains to extend his knowledge beyond his own expertise in medieval and later manuscripts. His scholarship was widely admired by the Cymmrodorion and the Carmarthenshire Antiquarian Society among others. He was also closely involved with the University of Liverpool, where he became reader in Welsh Medieval Antiquities (1921) during his time as the Commission's secretary.

Owen's staff included his assistant in 1908, Edward Thomas, was a fine writer and observer of the landscape but he found the Commission's work uncongenial (he regarded himself "a fish out of water") and resigned to concentrate on literature. Thomas proved to be one of Britain's finest war poets, but in 1917 he was killed in action at Arras. Three other of the early staff made greater contributions to the Commission. George Eyre Evans's life (1857–1939) spanned the formative years of modern archaeology. As a prolific antiquary with many publications to his name before he joined the Commission, he was most closely associated with Carmarthenshire, particularly the county museum and the antiquarian society. Alfred Neobard Palmer (1847–1915) was appointed in 1910 as a "temporary assistant inspector of Ancient Monuments" for six months, at 15s. a day with a guinea for subsistence and travelling. Palmer suffered ill health, and his appointment was an act of kindness by Edward Owen, who had earlier secured him a government pension in recognition of his historical researches. A chemist by profession, Palmer turned himself into a local historian, particularly of Wrexham, where the local studies library is named after him.

Ivor Mervyn Pritchard, an architect employed by HM Office of Works and Public Buildings, made a long lasting contribution. His services were loaned to the Commission to make plans and drawings for the inventories and he seems to have been responsible for much of the photography. The wash drawing of St Asaph Cathedral that is the frontispiece of the Flintshire volume is by Pritchard, and his plans and pen-and-ink drawings can be seen in the inventories for Denbighshire (1914), Carmarthenshire (1917) and Merioneth (1921).

=== First inventories ===
Following the publication of the first inventories (of Montgomeryshire and Flintshire in 1911–12), the Commission's work was praised in Parliament for its quality and value for money; but the Great War naturally slowed things down. Edward Owen, now unpaid, managed to keep the work going and the Carmarthenshire volume was published at the height of the war in 1917. At the same time, and although he was in his sixties, Owen was anxious to contribute to the war effort through a position in the newly-formed statistics department of the War Office, but he was turned down. For a brief period after the war Owen ran the Commission from his home in Wrexham, until new offices could be found in London. During his visits to the capital he took to sleeping in the office to carry out the work expected of him, which earned a mild rebuke from the Chief Commissioner of Works.

The future of the Royal Commission was in some doubt during the years of austerity, when the Office of Works considered a purge of Royal Commissions. This prompted the chairman, Vincent Evans, to urge Owen to publish the Merioneth volume as soon as possible, and when it appeared in 1921 Evans shrewdly sent a copy to the Prime Minister, David Lloyd George, who responded by congratulating the commissioners for "doing a real public service". The Commission's continuance was not questioned again for nearly seventy years. Nevertheless, financial cutbacks delayed the appearance of the Pembrokeshire inventory, and the Commission itself did not meet formally for two and a half years.

The fundamental nature of the inventories was bound to lead the Commission into other areas concerned with the historic sites and monuments it was recording, and this has characterised the Commission throughout its life. As early as 1916 Owen was allowed to make representations to the town clerk of Chepstow about the proposed destruction of a stretch of medieval town wall, and in 1926 the Commission was represented on the committees running the excavations at the Roman fort at Kanovium (Caerhun). Owen himself was in constant demand to give talks to national and local societies, and a steady stream of requests for information came in – for example on the Roman fort at Tomen-y-mur, Whitland Abbey, stone circles, place names and, especially, genealogy.

During the mid-1920s developments in professional archaeology exerted growing pressure for change in the approaches, methodology and structure of the Royal Commission. While the Commission had fulfilled its role of identifying monuments worthy of preservation, the volume on Pembrokeshire (1925) attracted criticism for its dearth of original fieldwork and its failure to keep up with advances in architectural recording and interpretation.

Edward Owen was prepared to defend the Commission's approach to its work, which had the merit of publishing lists of sites and monuments swiftly in the county inventories. But Owen also saw the need to keep abreast of scholarly advances, even though the financial climate of the post-war years made it difficult to find suitably qualified staff when they would be expected to work for practically nothing. A thorough review of the Commission's operations resulted in major revision of his original guidelines. The Commission had been fortunate in recruiting Cyril Fox, the new director of the National Museum of Wales, as a commissioner; supported by R. C. Bosanquet, he was largely responsible for the changes that were now made. What survived of Owen's guidelines were the county arrangement of inventories and the broad classification scheme he had devised. There was a shift in focus from the use of documents and antiquarian reports to fieldwork, and an insistence on a full record of each site, building or object, with original plans and descriptions made by the Commission itself. Categories or types of structures and objects were henceforward to be identified routinely, noting any significant variations of detail, and reference to the methods used by the English and Scottish Commissions in describing and mapping monuments would be more frequent.

The opportunity was not taken to extend the remit of the Commission's investigators to buildings dated after 1714, but this year was an advance on the earlier guidelines. Special attention would now be drawn to domestic structures of all sorts, including "humbler dwellings". Another novelty was consultation with "official referees" whose specialist advice would supplement the expertise of the small number of commissioners, especially in new and developing fields of knowledge. This enabled the Commission to recruit advisers of the calibre of J. E. Lloyd and Mortimer Wheeler.

In the remaining two years of his secretaryship Owen put in order the work already done on Anglesey. It was left to his successor, Wilfred J. Hemp, to oversee the full implementation of the new guidelines. As an experienced inspector of Welsh monuments in the Office of Works and a plain-speaking advocate of archaeology and archaeologists, in many ways Hemp was ideal for the task. On the other hand, he found the administrative burdens in a period of economic depression tiresome and his insistent attempts to squeeze resources from the "singularly ill-informed" Treasury seem to have been less effective than the efforts of Vincent Evans, who was familiar with the corridors of Whitehall.

The annual budget of the Commission was raised from £1,250 to £1,700 at the time of Hemp's appointment, but the story of the next decade is essentially one of constant struggle by both chairman and secretary to secure expert investigative staff and refine the quality of reporting, building on the principles of 1926. Leonard Monroe, a trained architect, was appointed as the secretary's assistant, and Hemp decided to employ Stuart Piggott, a young archaeologist with a distinguished career ahead of him, instead of a typist (but on a typist's salary of £3 a week). Convinced that each specialist member of "a skeleton staff of three should be a first rate man", Hemp nevertheless estimated that it would take forty years to complete the county inventories to the standard now adopted.

The test of the Commission's revised strategy and Hemp's stewardship was the Anglesey inventory, on which work had been proceeding since the mid-1920s. In November 1929 Hemp estimated that "it should be completed in about four years, if the services of a typist can be obtained". In Hemp's mind it also depended on strengthening the complement of staff, particularly in field archaeology; but, as the government grappled with economic crises over the next few years, there was little sympathy shown at the Treasury. A desperate Leonard Monroe repeatedly threatened to resign, and in 1933 Stuart Piggott did so. Even Hemp was moved to tell the commissioners that henceforward they could only count on receiving the "statutory allowance" of his time.

In the event, the Anglesey book was published in 1937. Its approach and structure set the pattern for the inventory volumes that would follow over the next half-century. One of its most striking features was its emphasis on the comparative study of sites and buildings and on the use of examples to establish types of structures so as to provide a deeper understanding of past societies. Site descriptions were arranged by parishes, maps and plans were generously provided, the spelling of Welsh place names followed principles recommended by J. E. Lloyd rather than the antiquated practices of the Ordnance Survey, and a helpful glossary of terms was included. The book was praised because it "not only set a fresh standard for work in Wales, but also dealt more comprehensively with the archaeology and history of the district concerned than did the publications of the fellow Commissions for England and Scotland". Vincent Evans, the long-serving chairman who had presided over the transformation of the Commission's work, died in November 1934, before the Anglesey inventory was published. He was succeeded by the Earl of Plymouth.

The next item on the agenda was the Caernarfonshire inventory. There was much to be said for applying the knowledge gained in Anglesey to the county immediately across the Menai Strait, and sporadic collection of materials on Caernarfonshire had taken place already. But the Second World War caused major disruption to the Commission's plans for this volume. During the war Hemp ran the evacuated Commission from his home in Criccieth. This enabled him to devote happy days to research and writing on a county that was the Commission's priority. His long-standing interest in history, genealogy and heraldry was applied to the wealth of medieval stone carvings and inscriptions, and his experience as an inspector for the Office of Works enabled him to report in 1941 on clearances at Conwy Castle so that additions could be made to its newly surveyed plan. Soon after the war ended, Hemp retired and Leonard Monroe moved elsewhere. In terms of experienced staff, and therefore continuance of its work, the Commission stood at a crossroads.

=== Second World War ===
During the war another strand of investigation and recording began that was later to be bound into the Royal Commission. This was the creation in 1940 of the National Buildings Record for England, Scotland and Wales because of concern that buildings might be destroyed by enemy action without any record ever having been made of them. With limited resources, it set about the formidable task of rapidly compiling a national architectural archive, and in a very short space of time it amassed an impressive collection of photographs and drawings, including the Courtauld Institute's already established Conway Library. Leonard Monroe was seconded to the National Buildings Record from the Royal Commission to cover south Wales. Photographers around the country were also engaged to photograph buildings in areas judged to be at greatest risk: most prolific of those working in Wales was George Bernard Mason, who produced photographs of exceptional quality. After the war the National Buildings Record photographers took to recording buildings ahead of the new threat posed by demolition, as owners of many fine houses could no longer afford to maintain them.

In 1946 the Royal Commission was clear about its programme of future work: to complete the Caernarfonshire inventory along modern lines. But more immediate decisions were needed about where the Commission should be based and who was to lead its small staff. A. H. A. Hogg (died 1989) was appointed the secretary in 1949. Hogg was by profession a civil engineer, but he had strong interests and field experience in archaeology going back to his teenage years. He came to the Royal Commission from a lectureship in engineering at Cambridge University. Hogg was par excellence a field worker, who imbued two generations of investigators with the principles and practices of rigorous recording, using chain, tape and theodolite. Probably at his urging, it was decided to base the Commission in Aberystwyth rather than return to London. Aberystwyth had the advantages of a central location in Wales and scholarly facilities close by in The National Library of Wales. The Commission has remained in Aberystwyth ever since.

By 1949 the rest of the Commission's staff was mostly young and inexperienced, with the singular exception of C. N. Johns, who had wide knowledge as a crusader castle archaeologist in the Palestine Department of Antiquities in the 1930s and 1940s, and immediately after the war had been seconded from the Royal Commission to be the British controller of antiquities and excavations in Libya. His was a name to conjure with in Middle Eastern archaeology for long after, and he applied his field experience to good effect in north Wales. During the years of recovery and growing prosperity in the 1950s and early 1960s, the staff grew in number and became more specialised in both field survey and site and building recording, eventually with a specialist photographer and professional illustrator, all of whose services ensured that the three Caernarfonshire volumes published between 1956 and 1964 maintained and enhanced the standards achieved in the Anglesey book twenty years earlier.

Petrol rationing at first had delayed the fieldwork, which was made more difficult, too, by mountainous terrain and bad weather. An important modification of the principles was made to extend the cut-off date for recording vernacular architecture of Wales from 1714 to 1750, with some examination of buildings constructed between then and 1850. These changes in the evolution of the Commission's interpretation of "historic monuments" reflected the passage of time and the life of buildings, as well as ideas about what should be recorded and preserved. In the more industrialised counties of Wales this would shortly raise very large issues for the Commission's future programme. like the earlier stress on "humbler dwellings" in the Anglesey inventory (of which a new edition appeared in 1960), the modifications doubtless owed much to Cyril Fox, still one of the commissioners, and to the publication of his and Lord Raglan's three volumes on Monmouthshire Houses in 1951–1954.

The Caernarfonshire books broke new ground in their recording of hundreds of huts and field systems, site descriptions like that of Caernarfon Castle (in Volume II), and the space given to local vernacular architecture and the small churches of the Caernarfonshire countryside. Volume II recorded the discoveries of the Roman marching camp at Penygwryd and Roman fort at Pen Llystyn. Volume III included the first complete survey ever made of Bardsey, the Isle of Saints. The whole enterprise was informed by a multiplicity of skilful plans and maps, as well as by hundreds of photographs.

=== National Monuments Record of Wales ===
In 1963 responsibility for the National Buildings Record was transferred to the three Royal Commissions and it was amalgamated with the records gathered during the course of their own work over the previous half-century. The Commissions were explicitly empowered to continue this established architectural work. In Wales Peter Smith was assigned as the emergency recorder with special responsibility for domestic architecture. By this stage the Commission had also amassed a considerable archive of measured drawings, surveys and photographs through its own inventory programme. These records documented archaeological sites and buildings of all periods, and the amalgamation created a substantial national archive which was renamed the National Monuments Record of Wales to reflect its unique scope and importance. Its primary functions were "to provide an index of all monuments, so that inquirers can be directed at once to the best information concerning any structure; and to fill the gaps in that information". These ambitious and important aims resulted in a classified card index, innovatory in its day, for every known site and structure in Wales. Managed by C. H. Houlder, it laid the foundation of the Commission's structured archive, database and enquiry service as they are today.

Monuments in the National Monuments Record of Wales are assigned a National Primary Record Number or NPRN.

When the Commission came to survey the county of Glamorgan, it faced a much larger and more complex body of architecture than that in previous inventories. A greater proportion of investigators' time was needed for architectural survey than for traditional earthwork archaeology, and it was realised that it would be possible to progress the work more efficiently if the system of recording by parishes were abandoned in favour of recording by a combination of period and monument type. Volume I, published in 1976, therefore focussed exclusively on prehistoric and early medieval Glamorgan and represented a major departure. This and the plans for further thematic volumes in the Glamorgan inventory were essentially the work of A. H. A. Hogg and his team. Although Hogg himself had retired as secretary in 1973, he continued to lend his services to the Commission until his late seventies.

In the meantime several other important developments had broadened the Royal Commission's responsibilities. In 1969 it took the initiative to list information for local authorities. Commissioners were sensitive to the inevitably slow progress of the authoritative, detailed inventory programme, and it seemed helpful to complement it with a rapid survey of those monuments that were increasingly at risk from development: they were defined as "all types of ancient structures which are no longer capable of active use", a definition that allowed the inclusion of certain industrial monuments but excluded churches and mansions. A further advantage of this new project was that priority could be given to two counties that so far had no inventories. Yet only two of these new lists were issued: the first for Cardiganshire in 1970 and the second in 1973 for the "Early Monuments" of Monmouthshire.

=== Excavated and recorded sites ===
A second experiment capitalised on the Commission's growing archive of excavated and recorded sites. In 1971 it published what it saw as "the first of a series of reports by which ... the National Monuments Record of Wales hopes to provide accounts of the major field monuments for which no adequate descriptions exist". This was a detailed survey of the hut settlement on Gateholm Island, Pembrokeshire. The commissioners turned for another development to one of the senior investigators, Peter Smith, who had been studying over a number of years the historical and stylistic evolution of house types in Wales. The resulting book, Houses of the Welsh Countryside, which was brought out at the end of 1975 to coincide with Architectural Heritage Year, demonstrated that the inventories could take yet another form, as national studies of a topic. Smith's book, a contribution of European importance to the history of domestic architecture, was published to great acclaim, and an expanded edition appeared in 1988.

Excavation was a prominent activity of the Royal Commission during Hogg's period as secretary, reflecting his own interests and the dearth of other organisations to carry them out. For example, between 1957 and 1960 staff were diverted to the rescue excavation of the Roman fort at Pen Llystyn, Caernarfonshire, and in 1962 Hogg directed rescue excavations associated with a hydro-electric scheme on the site of Bronze Age cairns at Aber Camddwr, Cardiganshire. For several seasons in the 1960s, L. A. S. Butler conducted excavations in medieval Conwy, including in the vicarage garden where a medieval building had possibly been destroyed during Owain Glyn Dŵr's revolt. Other excavations at this time were part of the inventory programme for Glamorgan, such as at Harding's Down in Gower, where a rampart section was cut and an entrance and two hut platforms were revealed in an Iron Age hillfort. The Commission made many significant archaeological discoveries, not the least being the identification of six new Roman marching camps between 1954 and 1972.

Of great significance for the future were the trials which the Commission made in the early 1970s of the use of vertical aerial photography to speed up the survey of nationally important sites: of the Pembrokeshire hillforts Gaer Fawr and Carn lngli in 1973, and in 1974 of Carn Goch, a hillfort in Carmarthenshire. The methodology was also adopted for the medieval site of Cefnllys Castle in Radnorshire.

=== Staff ===
The Commission's staff was active in the wider archaeological world in the post-war period. Hogg had a fruitful partnership with the castle historian, D. J. C. King, to compile lists of early castles and masonry castles in Wales and the Marches. He and several colleagues collaborated to publish the reports of pre-Second World War excavations at the hillfort of Pen Dinas, Aberystwyth.

The fourth secretary of the Royal Commission, Peter Smith (from 1973 to 1991), had joined the organisation in 1949 after a brief period as a trainee architect during which he became disillusioned with the prevailing modernist trend in architecture. At the outset his principal aim was to continue with the Glamorgan inventory, and five massive volumes were published between 1976 and 2000 which were highly praised – though even as the millennium ended the plan had not been fully realised. At the same time progress was made on the sites and monuments of Brecknock and a revision of the Radnorshire book of 1913 was begun to bring it up to modern scholarly standards. The chairman of the Commission, W. F. Grimes, encouraged greater interest in industrial remains – though he himself was a notable prehistorian. Particular attention was given to the early communications systems of the Swansea valley: a prelude to more extensive studies of Wales's canals and the remains of the Swansea region's industries.

In the post-war decades the Royal Commission had consistently supported the county history movement in Wales, and in due time practically all the volumes that appeared – and continue to appear – in the series of histories of the counties of Glamorgan, Cardigan, Pembroke, Merioneth and Monmouth have drawn on the Commission's archive for illustrations and, in some cases, on its staff and commissioners for chapters.

On the other hand, the Royal Commission's role in excavation was bound to change from the 1970s onwards. The creation of the four Welsh Archaeological Trusts as excavating units removed the need for the Commission to be as centrally involved in such activity as it once had been.

Following the formation of English Heritage to cover historic environment functions in England, it was decided to take a fresh look at the Royal Commissions. Management consultants were engaged by the government to examine value for money. As far as Wales was concerned, in 1988 their report stated that "Our strong impression of RCAHMW is that the best has become the enemy of the good. It is inward-looking, rather with the aura of an old-fashioned university department, it has not recognised the need for good management practices and the Commission has not fully recognised the value of integrating non-inventory activities into its priorities ... If RCAHMW is to represent good value for money, there needs to be major re-orientation of effort." This report was accepted by the government.

The debate about the usefulness of "static" county inventories in a changing world where developers, planners and owners needed direct access to current, reliable information about the historic environment had gone on for decades. The 1960s had seen the first shift away from inventory compilation with the establishment of the National Monuments Records in Wales, Scotland and England, making concrete the concept of the dynamic record. This dynamic record was made real through the work of the Welsh Archaeological Trusts, who were pioneers in developing computerised Historic Environment Records (HERs) in the 1970s. This was pioneered by Don Benson who was then Chief Executive of the Dyfed Archaeological Trust, and the HERs remain key to the delivery of archaeological public benefit across Wales today. The "active" role of the HERs is supported by the "archive" role of the NMRW.

=== Ordnance Survey ===
From the Royal Commission's point of view, an alternative to the static record of the inventories had been under consideration before the Commission's inception – the Ordnance Survey's (OS) record of archaeological sites for map depiction – and this would in due course be brought into the Royal Commissions. The Ordnance Survey's archaeology officer, C. W. Phillips, argued that, "This continuous aspect of the work is of great importance and compares favourably with that of some other institutions which are unable to continue their work in it effectively once they have completed the inventory of a county, excellent though that inventory normally is". He warned that, the Royal Commissions' completion of their inventories "cannot be expected before much of the matter of their inquiry has been either damaged or destroyed". Antiquities had been shown on OS maps from the late eighteenth century (at least two of the iconic features of these maps were introduced first in Wales: Gothic script for antiquities in 1812 and Egyptian typeface for Roman remains in 1816). Until the end of the Great War the identification and interpretation of antiquities had taken place in consultation with local experts and antiquaries, but in 1920 the Survey had appointed its first archaeological officer, O. G. S. Crawford, who built up a small but expert group, including W. F. Grimes, who later became chairman of the Welsh Commission. Throughout the 1950s and 1960s the OS archaeology branch amassed a considerable body of material on antiquities, which went far beyond what was required for mapping. The sites index included a short description and interpretation of each site, with bibliographical references and field observations. These were usually accompanied by a measured plan, normally at the appropriate basic mapping scale but sometimes supplemented with enlarged surveys and cross-sections to aid interpretation and help in draughting the published map.

In 1983 the Survey's archaeological division was transferred to the three Royal Commissions along with its invaluable sites index and responsibility for surveying, interpreting and maintaining a record of archaeological sites depicted on OS maps. In Wales since then the Royal Commission itself has continued to provide mapping information to the Ordnance Survey for basic scales and for derived mapping such as the popular 1/50,000 scale Landranger series. The supply of this information is an invaluable product of the Royal Commission's archaeological survey projects, ensuring that every user of Ordnance Survey maps can appreciate the historic sites depicted.

The consultants in 1988 estimated that only 11 per cent of the Commission's resources were allocated to Wales's National Monuments Record. They accordingly recommended an adjustment of the balance with the Commission's publications programme: increased priority should be given to the National Monuments Record "as the destination of ... survey data" for Wales, and computer-based technologies should be developed for "the storage, retrieval and dissemination of data". Along with improved management structures and an emphasis on staff training to ensure the future capacity of the Commission, here was a clear remit for the new chairman, Professor J. B. Smith, and the new secretary, Peter White, who came from English Heritage with extensive experience of administrative and financial management; both were appointed in 1991. In the following year a revised Royal Warrant confirmed the changed priorities of the Royal Commission.

In 1991 the crucial information technology post was created, and Terry James rather belatedly recast the Commission's data and introduced electronic recording. The use of the same software as that for the regional sites and monuments records helped the Commission to lead a partnership that resulted in data exchange through the Extended National Database (END).

=== Welsh Uplands Survey ===
The expansion of the aerial survey programme of the 1980s and the introduction of the survey to cover all extensive Welsh uplands continue to contribute to Welsh archaeology by locating thousands of hitherto unsuspected sites. Greater managerial skills were needed to operate the Commission's increasingly complex infrastructure and the Plas Crug building at Aberystwyth, into which the Commission moved in 1990.

At the same time the undoubted professionalism and scholarship of the Commission's staff were harnessed to maximum effect. This was well demonstrated by the large Welsh Nonconformist Chapels project, which was carried forward in partnership with the voluntary organisation, Capel. In time, all such projects came to be allocated to one of three branches, covering the main functions of survey and investigation, information management and public services, with close working between the staff of each.

The Commission's publications continued to prove a strength and extended far beyond the county inventories. Books were produced on topical subjects and particular sites or buildings. Studies of the collieries of Wales, Brecon Cathedral, Newport Castle (Pembrokeshire) and Guns across the Severn (the fortifications in the Severn channel) spring to mind. Gradually, from the 1990s onwards, there also developed a portfolio of outreach activity to complement management of the archive, supported by an education officer and organised from a refurbished library that welcomes the public.

=== Archive ===
The Royal Commission's archive gave the organisation a renewed raison d'être. Years of under-capitalisation of the National Monuments Record had meant that it had no effective, modern finding aids. Computerisation of the records data now began to unlock its riches, including the collection of images, the largest of its kind in Wales and half as big again as that of the National Library. The National Monuments Record had become a nationwide resource of a nature different from that of the regional sites and monuments records. It expanded rapidly with significant donations from many public and private sources supplementing the detailed survey and photographic records of the Commission itself. Transfers from many other public organisations, including Cadw on behalf of the Welsh Assembly Government, take place from time to time. Important collections have been accepted from the private and commercial sectors, one of the most notable being the acquisition in 2008 of the Aerofilms collection of historic oblique air photographs. Today, the photographs in the National Monuments Record are Wales's largest national collection, with about 1.5 million images. A foretaste of the future was the Commission's participation in the Gathering the Jewels project, which provided an opportunity to make available online many notable images from the National Monuments Record and began a digitisation programme which remains one of the Commission's priorities in its service to the public.

=== SWISH Partnership ===
In order to provide public access to its archives and collections, the RCAHMW entered into a partnership with its Scottish counterpart. This partnership was known as SWISH (Shared Web Information Services for Heritage) and was designed to develop online public services. This collaboration was the first such project between the two devolved administrations that had recently come into being. SWISH supported Coflein, the Commission's internet portal: this carries details of some 80,000 sites and monuments in Wales. Much of the information on Coflein is derived from the Historic Environment Records of the Welsh Archaeological Trusts; information also comes from the National Monuments Record archive catalogue. In 2006 SWISH began developing the Historic Wales Portal, which offers access to the historic environment records of a wide range of bodies, including Amgueddfa Cymru – Museum Wales, Cadw, and the four Welsh Archaeological Trusts.

The SWISH partnership enabled access to the National Monuments Record using map searching online. It ended in 2019, and the Royal Commission has begun to develop its own system to replace it – although not in partnership with the other heritage organisations in Wales.

=== Hidden Histories ===
A five-episode BBC television series following the field investigations of the Commission, Hidden Histories, was broadcast in 2008 on BBC2 Wales and in 2009 on BBC4. A second series was in production in summer 2009. Both series were made by Element Productions Ltd and presented by Huw Edwards.

=== Proposed merger ===
In May 2012, the Welsh Government announced that it wished "to create a process whereby the core functions of the Royal Commission could be merged with other organizations, including Cadw". The merger would have been similar to that undertaken in England in 1999, when the English Royal Commission was absorbed into English Heritage. Following a consultation exercise, the Minister for Culture and Sport announced in January 2014 that the two organisations would remain separate for the time being.

== Services ==
The RCAHMW maintains and curates the National Monuments Record of Wales (NMRW) holding a national collection of information about the archaeological, architectural and historical heritage of Wales and provides a public information service, drawing on both archival and published sources and benefiting from specialist advice from RCAHMW staff. The National Monuments Record includes drawings, photographs, maps, plans and descriptions for a total of over 80,000 sites, buildings and maritime remains. With 1.5 million photographs, it is the largest photographic archive in Wales. The NMRW is an archive for research purposes, as distinct from the Historic Environment Records maintained by the Welsh Archaeological Trusts on behalf of Welsh Ministers by statute, which are the primary active record for all of Wales.

=== Enquiry services ===
The National Monuments Record of Wales welcomes enquiries from individuals and organisations interested in the many and varied aspects of the heritage of Wales.

=== Library and search room ===
The Commission's specialist reference library contains books and journals, which may be consulted during public opening hours. Copies of material from the archive may also be purchased.

=== Research and recording ===
Since its inception in 1908, the Royal Commission has established a reputation for maintaining an expertise in, and developing standards for, the survey, interpretation and reconstruction of historic buildings and archaeological sites both on land and under the sea. The Royal Commission partakes in archaeological survey, architectural recording, maritime survey and recording, and drone and aerial survey.

The Royal Commission purchased an Electronic Measuring Device (EDM) in 1984 in order to further and improve land survey work and geographical mapping of Wales.

The Survey and Investigation Team utilises a wide range of digital survey techniques in the survey of diverse heritage of Wales. Total Station Theodolites (TST) survey, Global Navigation Satellite System (GNSS) survey, airborne laser scanning (LiDAR), terrestrial laser scanning, photogrammetry and giga-pixel photography are employed to provide detailed, highly accurate 3-dimensional recording of sites, landscapes, structures and buildings. Since 2017, drone survey has been used both for low-altitude photography and video alongside photogrammetry of complex sites and buildings.

This data is both archived in the National Monuments Record of Wales, creating an enduring record of the site for future consideration, and is made available via Sketchfab. Together, survey and recording remain the essential basis for understanding and interpreting the sites and monuments of Wales.

== Archive ==
The National Monuments Record of Wales (NMRW) holds information about the historic environment of Wales. It includes almost two million items, including photographs, drawings, surveys, reports and maps.

=== Coflein ===
Coflein is the online database for the National Monuments Record of Wales (NMRW). The name is derived from the Welsh cof (memory) and lein (line). Coflein contains details of many thousands of archaeological sites, monuments, buildings and maritime sites in Wales, together with an index to the drawings, manuscripts and photographs held in the NMRW archive collections. Coflein is an archive, whereas the Historic Environment Records are a statutory resource maintained by the Welsh Archaeological Trusts on behalf of Welsh Ministers, and are the primary active record for all of Wales.

== Publications ==
The Commission has published over a hundred books developing and promoting understanding of aspects of the historic environment.

== See also ==
- Architecture of Wales
- List of castles in Wales
- List of hill forts in Wales
- Historic houses in Wales
- Archaeology of Wales
- Welsh Archaeological Trusts
  - Clwyd-Powys Archaeological Trust
  - Dyfed Archaeological Trust
  - Glamorgan-Gwent Archaeological Trust
  - Gwynedd Archaeological Trust
- Welsh Tower houses
- List of monastic houses in Wales
- List of Roman villas in Wales
- List of lighthouses in Wales
- List of Cadw properties
  - Scheduled monuments in Wales
  - Listed buildings in Wales
- List of museums in Wales
