= Heritage asset =

Building of historic or cultural value

A heritage asset is something which has value because of its contribution to a nation's society, knowledge, or culture. It is usually a physical object, but in some contexts, it may be intangible social and spiritual inheritance.

The concept is found in several contexts:

- In financial accounting;
- In geographical planning in the UK;
- By museums and artistic and cultural organisations for their collections.

== Accounting definition ==
A tangible asset with historical, artistic, scientific, technological, geophysical or environmental qualities that is held and maintained principally for its contribution to knowledge and culture.

Heritage assets are accounted for as a distinct category because their value is unlikely to be fully reflected in a financial value or price. Many are unique, meaning their value may increase, rather than depreciate, even if their physical condition deteriorates. Also, heritage assets may incur high costs to maintain them and their life might be measured in hundreds of years.

Heritage assets are often described as 'inalienable', because the holder cannot sell or dispose of them without external consent. These restrictions may be formed in law, for example, trust law relating to a charity's governing documents. Some argue that inalienability means that assets held in trust are not actually assets of the organisation that holds them. However, the UK Financial Reporting Council states that inalienable assets meet the definition of an asset because they may be used to generate income (e.g. attracting visitors to a museum) and have service potential.

The UK government publishes a list of heritage assets that are tax exempt.

== Planning definition ==
The term 'heritage asset' is used in the UK to describe a range of geographical components of the historic environment which have been positively identified as having a degree of significance meriting consideration in planning decisions.

These include listed buildings; old buildings that are not listed but still have local historical importance; scheduled monuments; war memorials; historic wreck sites; parks; historic gardens; conservation areas, archaeological sites and so on. They also include places and properties that are not formally protected through the designation system, and certain historic landscapes. The term 'heritage asset' is often used as a convenient collective term for all these items.

Not all heritage assets are legally protected through the designation system. UK heritage protection practice also allows for buildings or other assets to be granted a status as a "non-designated heritage asset":

Non-designated heritage assets are buildings, monuments, sites, places, areas or landscapes identified by plan-making bodies as having a degree of heritage significance meriting consideration in planning decisions but which do not meet the criteria for designated heritage assets.

Only those that have special interest or national importance are protected through a range of separate pieces of legislation as either scheduled monuments; listed buildings; registered parks and gardens; registered battlefields; historic wrecks or conservation areas. However, many locally important heritage assets, which do not meet the criteria for national designation, are noted in local council lists, on local heritage lists and on 'Historic Environment Records'. These are referred to in local and regional planning policies.. 'Historic environment records' (HERs) were previously called 'Sites and Monuments Records'.

Two-thirds of all heritage assets are said to be privately owned, which reflects the fact that they are often small houses and local sites, rather than just big public buildings.

The Penfold Review of non-planning consents agreed that the recommendations outlined in the Draft Heritage Protection Bill 2009 should be adopted. This would result in a simpler (and hopefully faster and less expensive) planning system.

== Cultural definition ==
The term heritage asset is less commonly used within a cultural context. The UK Highways Agency has developed a series of Cultural Heritage Assets Management Plans (CHAMP) which are designed to protect and enhance the historic environment surrounding the Strategic Road Network. Manchester University uses the term 'cultural asset' for its museums and art gallery collections.

The term is more frequently used in Canada and Australia where it refers to works of art, rituals, ceremonies and aural heritage (i.e. stories and folklore).

== See also ==
- Cultural heritage
- Sites and monuments record
