= Llanllyfni lunula =

Gold lunula found in Wales

- Lunula Llanllyfni
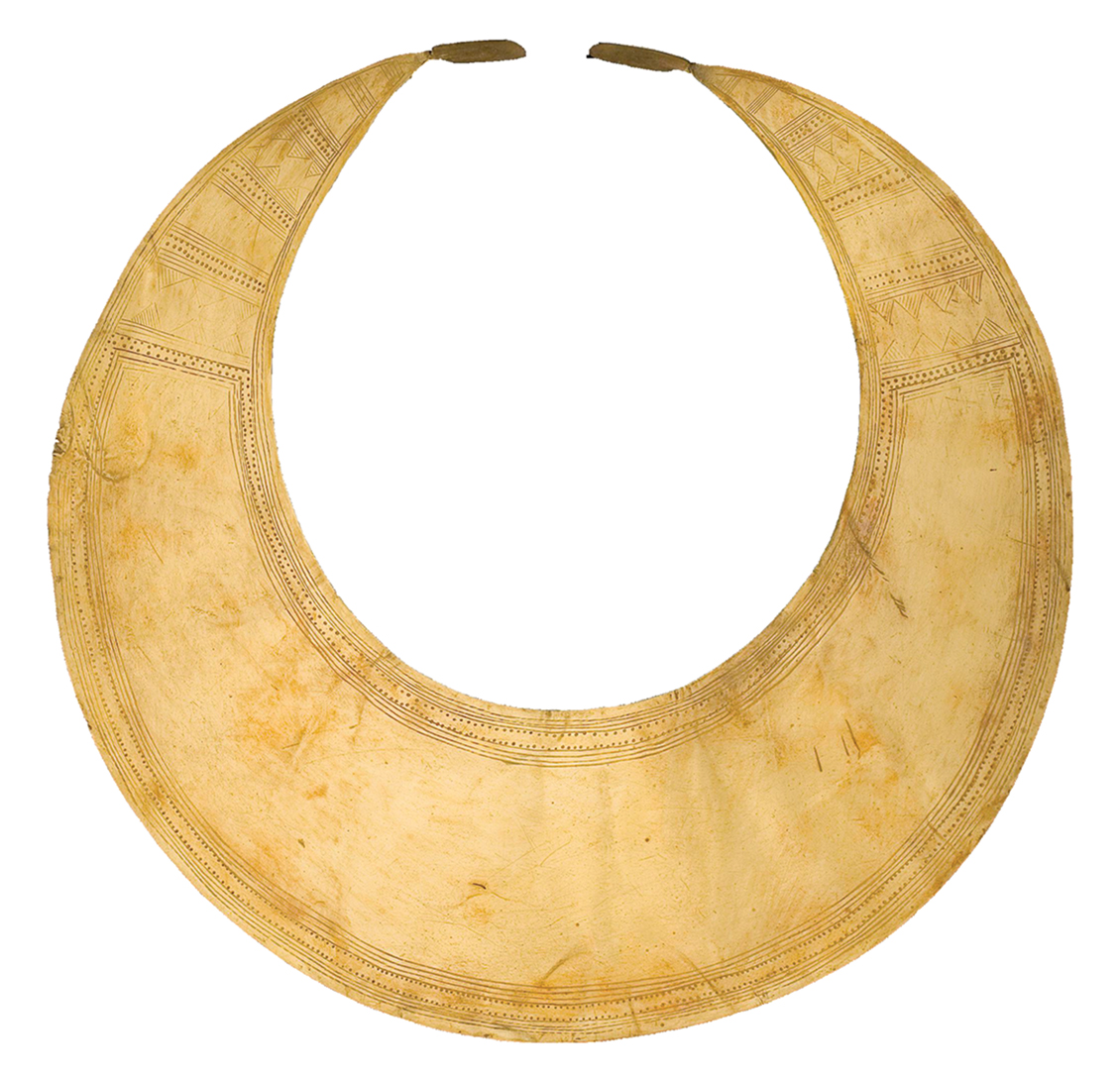
- Material: Gold
- Created: c. 2200 BC
- Discovered: 1869; Wales, United Kingdom
- Discovered by: Griffith Owen
- Present location: British Museum

The Llanllyfni lunula (Welsh: Lunula Llanllyfni) is a gold lunula, found a few miles from Llanllyfni, Gwynedd, Wales but currently held on loan in St Fagan's National Museum of History in Cardiff, Wales. It dates from c. 2200 BC.

== About ==
The lunula is made of decorated gold and dated to 2200-2000 BC and is one of the earliest gold ornaments from Wales. Other estimates suggest 2400-2000 BC of the Late Neolithic/Early Bronze Age. The lunula is the heaviest lunula from the islands of Britain and Ireland, weighing 185g.

Llanllyfni lunula. Weighing 185.4g (6.5 ounces) and measuring 24cm (9.5 inches) in diameter. This crescent-shaped ornament probably originated as a single rod shaped ingot and was expertly hammered into shape. The intricate decoration of zig-zags, lines and dots was then added using a fine-pointed tool and a copper or bronze punch. These designs are very similar to those used to adorn pottery made at this time.

It is likely to have been a ceremonial piece. Lunulae are common finds in Ireland and research evidence suggests that multiple Irish lunulae are made from Cornish gold. The decoration on the Llanllyfni lunula is similar to the decoration of many Beaker pottery vessels from Wales. This is a 'Provincial' type lunula with normal transverse end-plates and fine incised geometric ornament towards the tips of the horns.

The lunula was found in a bog of Llecheiddior-uchaf ffarm near Dolbenmaen around 1869. A farmer noticed what he thought might be a yellow laurel leaf sticking out of some peat. Unsatisfied with his self-explanation, he later returned and unearthed the lunula in full.

The British Museum acquired the lunula in 1869 after purchasing it from a Griffith H. Owen.

On 6 October 2025, the Llanllyfni Lunula was stolen from a display case in a raid at St Fagan's National Museum. The theft targeted the museum's Bronze Age gold collection, which included the lunula alongside several other invaluable artefacts.

== Exhibition history ==
- 2018 June-present, Cardiff, St Fagans National History Museum, Making History LT Loan
- 1979-2014 15 Nov-28 Mar, Cardiff, National Museum and Gallery of Wales, Origins-In Search of Early Wales, LT Loan
- 1964 25 Jul-5 Sep, Swansea, Glynn Vivian Art Gallery, Art in Wales

== See also ==
- Archaeology of Wales
