= Dyfed Archaeological Trust =

Welsh archaeological charity (1970s-2024)

- Map of Wales showing the area covered by the Dyfed Archaeological Trust
- Successor: Heneb
- Formation: mid-1970s
- Dissolved: April 1, 2024; 2 years ago
- Purpose: To advance the education of the public in archaeology
- Trust Director: Ken Murphy

Dyfed Archaeological Trust conducting a geophysical survey in Pembroke Castle's outer bailey in 2016.

The Dyfed Archaeological Trust (Welsh: Ymddiriedolaeth Archaeolegol Dyfed) was one of the four Welsh Archaeological Trusts established in the mid-1970s and dissolved in 2024 when it became Heneb, an archaeological organisation covering all of Wales.

== Overview ==
It had the charitable object 'to advance the education of the public in archaeology'. Its core area comprised Carmarthenshire, Ceredigion and Pembrokeshire (the old county of Dyfed) in south-west Wales.

The Trust provides archaeological and related advice to central government, local planning authorities and other public and private organisations. It maintains the regional Historic Environment Record. The Welsh Archaeological Trusts were pioneers in developing Historic Environment Records (HERs) in the 1970s: Wales was the first part of the UK to develop a fully national system of what were then called ‘Sites and Monuments Records’; this fully computerised system was pioneered by the Dyfed Archaeological Trust Chief Executive, Don Benson.

Data included in the Historic Environment Record are publicly available on a dedicated website, Archwilio. The Trust also undertakes a wide range of field- and office-based projects, is a limited company and a registered charity.

== Notable people ==
- W. F. Grimes, Chair of the Trust 1975-1988
- Ken Murphy, Director of the Trust since 2007
- Christopher R. Musson, Chair of the Trust 1989-1991 and 2005-2010

== Merger ==
In September 2023 the four Welsh Archaeological Trusts, including Dyfed Archaeological Trust, merged and were re-named Heneb: the Trust for Welsh Archaeology.

== See also ==
- Clwyd-Powys Archaeological Trust
- Glamorgan-Gwent Archaeological Trust
- Gwynedd Archaeological Trust
- Cadw
- Royal Commission on the Ancient and Historical Monuments of Wales
- Welsh Archaeological Trusts
