= Alexander Hubert Arthur Hogg =

British archaeologist

Alexander Hubert Arthur Hogg (1908–1989) was a British archaeologist best known for his work on hillforts. His gazetteer British Hill Forts: an index was published in 1979.

== Education ==
Hogg was educated at Highgate School in London and Sidney Sussex College, Cambridge.

== Career ==
He began his professional career as a civil engineer. Throughout his career he maintained an interest in archaeology, coming to specialise in the construction and design of hillforts. In 1949 he became Secretary of the Royal Commission on the Ancient and Historical Monuments of Wales. He remained there until his retirement, developing the commission's approaches to archaeological survey and recording. He was Chair of the Gwynedd Archaeological Trust in 1982/83.

Hogg's monumental gazetteer British Hill Forts: an index (1979) was the first comprehensive list of hillforts in the British Isles.

== Publications ==
- Hogg, A.H.A. 1979, British Hill-forts - an index. British Archaeological Reports (BAR British Series 62).
- Hogg, A.H. A. 1984, Guide to the Hill-forts of Britain. Paladin.

== See also ==
- Atlas of Hillforts of Britain and Ireland
