= Edward Anwyl =

Welsh academic (1866–1914)

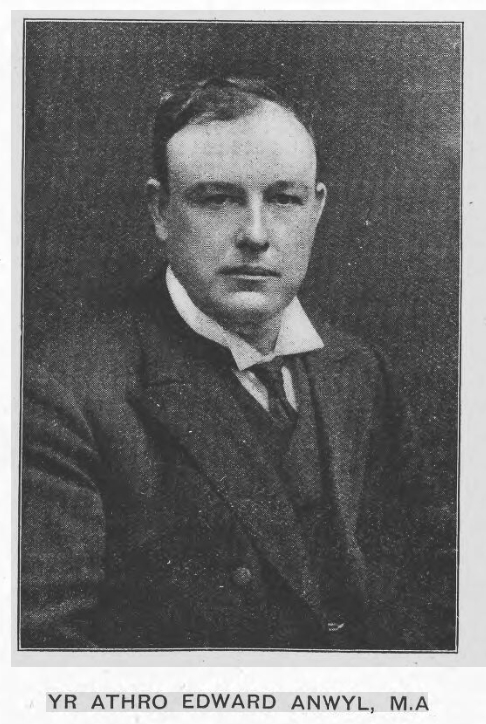
- Born: 5 August 1866; Chester, England
- Died: 8 August 1914 (aged 48)

Sir Edward Anwyl (5 August 1866 – 8 August 1914) was a Welsh academic, specializing in the Celtic languages.

== Biography ==
Anwyl was born in Chester, England, and educated at the King's School, Chester. He went on to study at Oriel College, Oxford, and Mansfield College, Oxford, and was a co-founder of Cymdeithas Dafydd ap Gwilym.

In 1892, he became Professor of Welsh at the University of Wales, Aberystwyth, and was later appointed Professor of Comparative Philology. He was knighted in July 1911.

In 1913, he became Principal of the newly founded Monmouthshire Training College at Caerleon. He was a lay preacher and a member of the University of Wales Theological Board and the Royal Commission on the Ancient and Historical Monuments of Wales.

== Esperanto ==
He is one of the pioneers of Esperanto in Wales. He oversaw the release of Welsh Key of Esperanto. He was a Member of the British Esperanto Association (BEA), and at the meeting of the South Wales Esperanto League, on 11 July 1914 in Pontypridd, he made a public speech about that language. In January 1914, he also presided over a propaganda meeting in Pontypridd on the occasion of the visit of the President of BEA to South Wales.

== Works ==
- Welsh Accidence (1898)
- Welsh Syntax (1899)
- Celtic Religion in Pre-Christian Times (1906)
