= Association of Local Government Archaeological Officers =

Body of archaeologists in UK

The Association of Local Government Archaeological Officers, or ALGAO, functions as a body to represent archaeologists working for local authorities and national parks in the United Kingdom.

ALGAO resulted from the merger of the Association of County Archaeological Officers (ACAO) and the Council of District Archaeological Officers (CDAO) in 1996. These organisations, and consequently ALGAO, were centred on England and Wales. This situation remained until ALGAO merged with the Association of Regional and Island Archaeologists (ARIA) in 2006, who until that point represented archaeologists performing similar duties in Scotland.

The organisations ALGAO - Cymru, ALGAO - Scotland, and ALGAO - England were formed to serve the constituent regions. The Association has regional, national, transnational and thematic committees. It exists to provide a voice for local authority in delivering local, regional and national government policy; to ensure local government participation in policy for culture and education; to contribute to improving the sustainable management of the historic environment and promote development of high standards in the historic environment profession. The Association has also published guidance for local authority involvement in heritage management and policy. Historic England plays a significant role in much of the work of the Association's members. Together, ALGAO and Historic England play a crucial role in planning-led archaeology, a sector which in turn employs some 74% of British archaeologists. ALGAO Members' principal roles are to advise a Local Planning Authority and to run Historic Environment Records.

The ALGAO Cymru attracted press attention when it supported the assertion from the Castles and Town Walls of King Edward in Gwynedd World Heritage Site Management Plan 2018–28, that 'History has bequeathed two sets of cultural values to the castles and town walls of King Edward I in Gwynedd. On the one hand, they are admired for their grandeur and for their quality as works of architecture; on the other, they are seen as symbols of oppression and alienation. Both sets of cultural values contribute to the importance of the World Heritage Site' The castles were built by English king Edward I (who defeated Llywelyn ap Gryffydd, the last Welsh Prince of Wales and brought Wales under the English monarchy).

It was reported that ALGAO Cymru had called for the removal of a statue of Welsh-American explorer Sir Henry Morton Stanley (who coined the phrase “Dr Livingstone, I presume?”) in Denbigh. However, their case study on Morton Stanley refers to a panel of experts convened in Brussels, that concluded that some statues in Belgium might be removed. Although the Association commented, “People who have been subjected to racial prejudice or racist attacks may find it traumatic to see figures who had known connections to racist policies or actions, celebrated prominently.” the guidance does not specifically recommend the removal of the Denbigh statue. The campaign to remove the statue of Stanley was ultimately unsuccessful.
