= Welsh Archaeological Trusts =

Former archaeology trusts in Wales

The Welsh Archaeological Trusts (Welsh: Ymddiriedolaethau Archaeolegol Cymru) were the four archaeological organisations covering Wales, from their establishment in the mid-1970s until their merger into a single archaeological organisation, Heneb, in 2024.

== Overview ==
They were established in the mid-1970s to respond to rescue archaeology. They are independent charitable trusts which together provide a uniform regional archaeology service across Wales, working closely with Welsh Government and local authorities and forming a 'tripod' of archaeology and cultural heritage institutions with Cadw and the Royal Commission on the Ancient and Historical Monuments of Wales.

The Trusts maintain Historic Environment Records for their respective areas to provide archaeological advice to central government, planning authorities and other public bodies. This heritage management work is supported by Cadw, together with associated archaeological projects and conservation of sites and historic landscapes. Although they perform some of the functions that elsewhere in the UK are delivered by public bodies, the Welsh Archaeological Trusts are independent charities with political and operational autonomy. The Welsh Archaeological Trusts also generate income by providing archaeological consulting and contracting services for a range of clients - both in Wales and elsewhere. They also deliver a wide range of public engagement and archaeological outreach events and activities, with funding from many sources.

The four trusts comprise:

1. Clwyd-Powys Archaeological Trust; 2. Dyfed Archaeological Trust; 3. Glamorgan-Gwent Archaeological Trust; 4. Gwynedd Archaeological Trust

The Welsh HERs were made statutory by the Historic Environment (Wales) Act 2016. This placed an obligation on Welsh Ministers to maintain the HERs, and this duty is discharged by the four Welsh Archaeological Trusts.

On 1 July 2010 the four Welsh Trusts launched their online searchable HER website known as Archwilio, at the Treftadaeth Conference in Swansea. The site was launched by Alun Ffred Jones AM, Minister for Heritage, who observed “Wales is the first country in Britain that has made all its archaeological records available online”, and “Archwilio will be a tremendous asset not only for the people of Wales but also for those further afield who have an interest in the rich archaeology and cultural heritage of our country”. The site contains the combined record of the four Trusts and gives the public free access to over 100,000 pieces of information about historic sites across Wales.

== Merger ==
In September 2023 the four Welsh Archaeological Trusts agreed to merge. As part of this process, in November 2023 the Dyfed Archaeological Trust changed its name to Heneb: the Trust for Welsh Archaeology. In April 2024 the other three Welsh Archaeological Trusts joined Heneb: the Trust for Welsh Archaeology. The resulting organisation has a pan-Wales overview, whilst maintaining regionally-based operations.

== See also ==
- Archaeology of Wales
