= Historic landscape characterisation =

Historic landscape characterisation is a programme initiated by English Heritage to increase understanding of the wider designed landscape, beyond that of the planned parkland of the country estate. Similar programmes operate in Scotland, Wales and the Republic of Ireland, although different terminology is used. In Catalonia, since 2010, there is the PaHisCat program.

== Description ==
Historic characterisation is described by the Council for British Archaeology as "a way of going beyond intuition to get beneath the skin of a place and look at its essential qualities and character." The historic landscape characterisation programme does not restrict itself to historic buildings, ornamental landscapes and purely "archaeological" features, but embraces other man made features such as hedges and managed woodland. It recognises that the landscape itself can be historic (in addition to historic features within it). Recognising the historic character of a landscape is intended to allow the landscape itself to be managed and protected within the planning regime operating in England. In most cases, characterisation is focused on an English county, although in some cases it is applied to a region crossing county boundaries.

The programme is intended to:

- document the existing situation in a standardised way;
- identify gaps that merit investigation;
- enable participation in the process by local residents;
- provide information for bodies responsible for planning and land use.

The results are incorporated within a geographical information system which allows maps to be prepared at the level of detail appropriate to the particular purpose. Types of landscape are characterised based on the way in which they were formed, their current and earlier land uses and their physical appearance.

Other than the landscape itself, the methodology is largely desk based; sources include aerial photographs as well as current and historic maps. Since the landscape is not static, the characterisation will be updated periodically. Despite being a largely desk-based subject, some academics are keen to point out that this is not the most important way to understand the historic landscape. They emphasize the "social and experiential" nature of the landscape, and that historically, this is how the landscape would have been understood: in person. It is also important to bear in mind that the landscape, as W. G. Hoskins stated in the 1950s, at the birth of landscape history as a discipline, that the landscape is a palimpsest. HLC projects only display one layer at a time, and can be misleading without closer examination combined with some knowledge of landscape history.

Historic landscape characterisation has no statutory basis, however local planning authorities are required to "take account of the historical dimensions of the landscape as a whole". A good example of the advice of an HLC being ignored is that of the "West of Stevenage" building proposal; in which the HLC and other sources recommended that the proposal be turned down, it was granted by the then deputy prime minister, John Prescott. However, the Isle of Axholme (Lincolnshire) was granted extra protection from development by the historic landscape characterisation project, so it can clearly be seen that some instances, or some authorities, use these projects and their advice more carefully than others.
