= Historic Environment Records =

Information services regarding archaeology

Historic Environment Records (HERs) are information services for use by the public and historic environment professionals. They capture details of archaeology, buildings and structures of historic interest, chance finds, landscapes, battlefields, designed parks and gardens, collectively ‘Heritage Assets’. HERs can be accessed online, or by requesting a search. HERs exist in England, Wales, Scotland, Northern Ireland, crown dependencies, and elsewhere

== Purpose and organisation ==
The purpose of HERs is to allow the public and heritage professionals to answer questions about Heritage Assets. For example, ‘will any heritage be harmed by development?’; or ‘What can the HER tell me about stone circles / Roman roads / medieval villages / industrial buildings / world war two defences?

HERs get their information from reports on archaeological investigations, historic building surveys, and research (done by the public, academics, local societies, HER staff, etc.). An array of documentary, cartographic and data sources are used for this research. The mechanism for submitting research or data to each HER differs, and a conversation with the record manager (often called an HER Officer) is recommended. Most reports arise from archaeological works done before a development takes place. A common misconception is that builders discover archaeology and call archaeologists. In reality, heritage assets are often already recorded, or can be predicted by specialists using the evidence in the HER, who then recommend appropriate investigations. This advice is separate to that provided for sites with Statutory protection such as Listed Buildings or Scheduled Monument designations.

Typically, HERs in England and Scotland are maintained by County Councils or Unitary Authorities, although there are exceptions. In Northern Ireland there is a single HER. A Marine HER for England is maintained by Historic England. The Levelling Up and Regeneration Act 2023 made it compulsory for Local Authorities in England and Wales to maintain an Historic Environment Record. Two films about HERs were released in March 2026, 'What are Historic Environment Records?' and 'Why Historic Environment Records Matter'
