= Cadw =

Welsh Government historic environment service

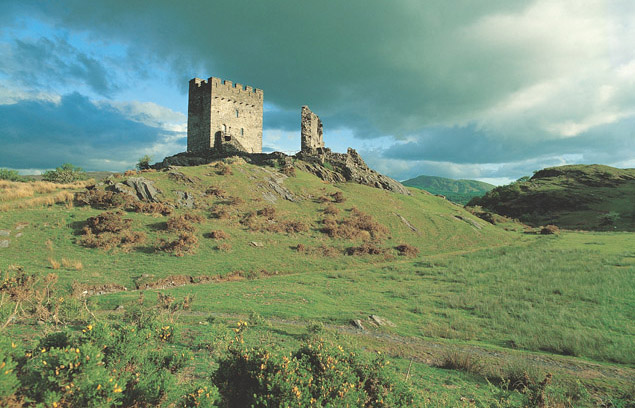
- Dolwyddelan Castle, one of the sites in Cadw's care.

Service overview
- Formed: October 1984
- Jurisdiction: Wales
- Headquarters: Tŷ’r Afon; Bedwas Road; Caerphilly CF83 8WT; 51.58874412500994°N 3.2062031798064234°W
- Employees: 250
- Minister responsible: Heledd Fychan, Cabinet Minster for Culture and Sport
- Service executive: Gwilym Hughes, Head of Cadw
- Parent department: Directorate of Culture, Sport and Tourism
- Website: cadw.gov.wales

Cadw ([ˈkadu], a Welsh verbal noun meaning "keeping/preserving") is the historic environment service of the Welsh Government and part of the Tourism and Culture group. Cadw works to protect the historic buildings and structures, the landscapes and heritage sites of Wales, to make them available for the public to visit, enjoy, and understand their significance. Cadw manages 127 state-owned properties and sites. It arranges events at its managed properties, provides lectures and teaching sessions, offers heritage walks, and hosts an online shop. Members of the public can become members of Cadw to gain membership privileges.

Cadw marked its 40th year in 2024, by which time more than 33,000 properties, structures and monuments were under its care.

== Aims and objectives ==
As the Welsh Government's historic environment service, Cadw is charged with protecting the historic environment of Wales, and making it accessible to members of the public. To this end, in 2010–11 it identified four aspects of its work: it would take measures to conserve the heritage of Wales, its ancient buildings, and monuments; it would aim to sustain the distinctive characters of the different landscapes and urban areas; it would try to help people understand and care about their country, their locality, its history, and Wales' place in the world; and it would aim to improve the wellbeing of people in Wales.

=== Conservation and protection ===
Cadw is responsible for the care and upkeep of four World Heritage Sites in Wales: the Castles and Town Walls of King Edward in Gwynedd, the Pontcysyllte Aqueduct, the Slate Landscape of Northwest Wales, and the Blaenavon Industrial Landscape.

Many of these listed sites are in private ownership, but Cadw has a specific responsibility (as of 2022) for the care and upkeep of the 130 historic sites that are in state ownership, employing staff at 28 sites. Many of Wales' great castles and other monuments, such as bishop's palaces, historic houses, and ruined abbeys, are protected and maintained in this way, as well being opened to the public. Cadw has been appointed by the Welsh Government and is the successor body in Wales to the Ministry of Works.

Cadw also identifies (and develops the criteria for identification) of historical assets in Wales. In 2011 there were 29,936 listed buildings in Wales; of these, 493 were the most important Grade I listed buildings, 2,124 were Grade II* and 27,319 were Grade II listed. Most of these were in private ownership. Also in Wales were 4,175 Scheduled Monuments, 6 Designated historic wrecks, and 523 Conservation Areas; these designations means that the buildings or objects concerned are protected by statute. A register of significant Welsh battlefield sites is also under preparation.

Cadw also provides support to other organisations with responsibility for understanding, conserving and interpreting the archaeology and cultural heritage of Wales. These include the Royal Commission on the Ancient and Historical Monuments of Wales which functions as an archive (around 90% of its funding comes from Welsh Government), and the Welsh Archaeological Trusts which are active in research, heritage management and supporting sustainable development across Wales (only 50% of their funding is from Cadw).

=== Area character studies ===
There are 58 Historic Landscapes and 384 Historic parks and gardens in Wales. Cadw is also undertaking urban character studies of urban areas. Eight had been completed by September 2013. Combined with a register of buildings and ancient monuments at risk these aim to enable management decision making and grant allocation to strengthen the character of different areas.

=== Care and operation ===
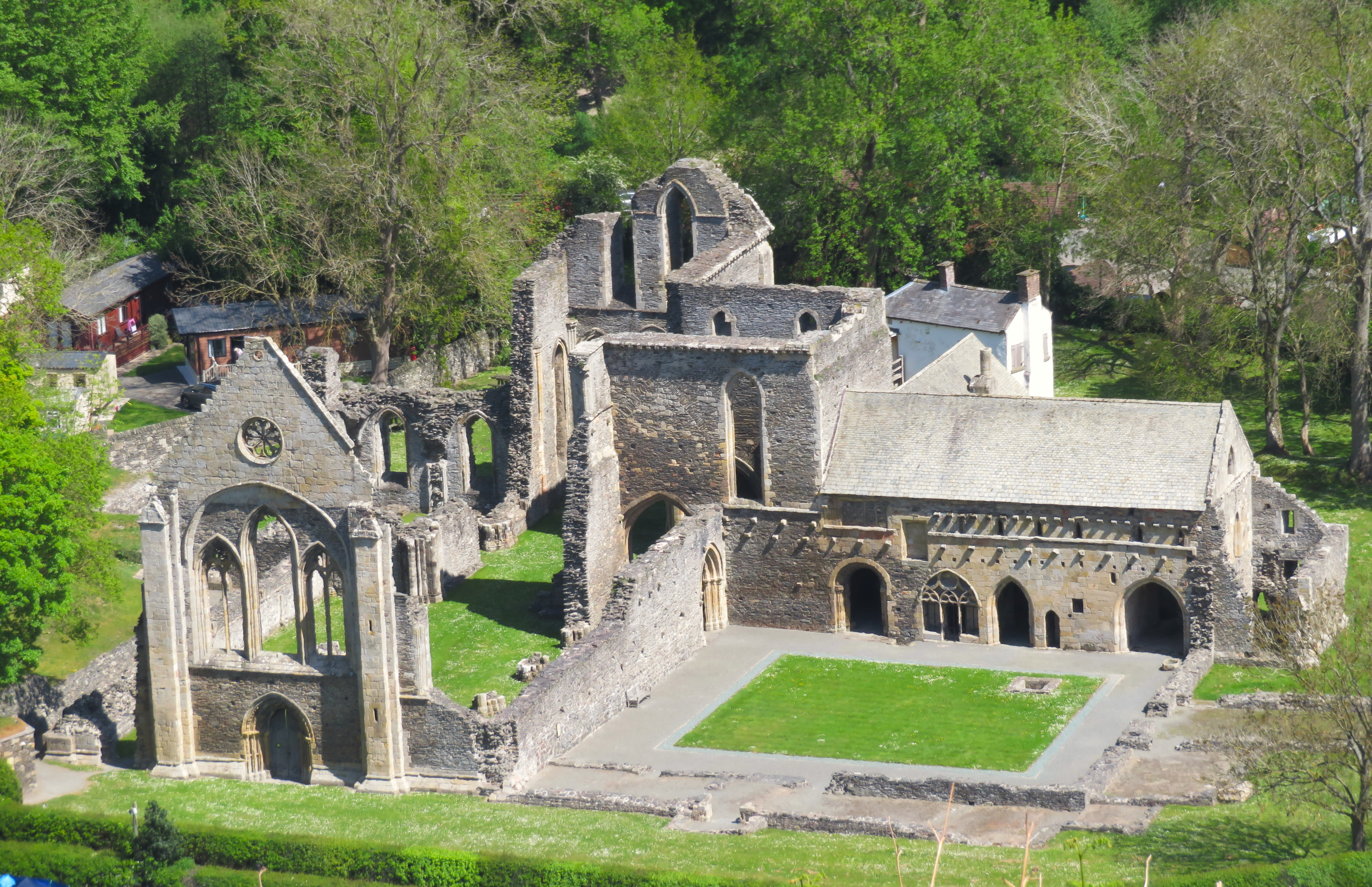
Valle Crucis Abbey ruins, a historic abbey in Cadw's care

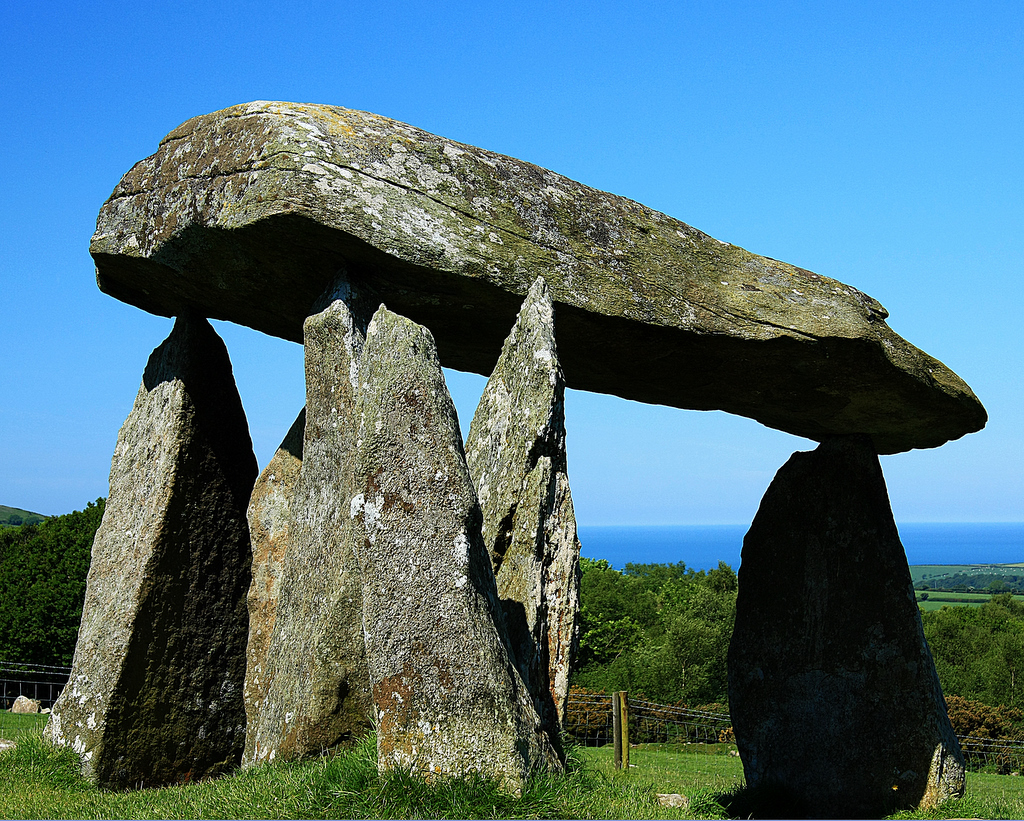
Pentre Ifan, a Neolithic dolmen in Pembrokeshire

Cadw operates most of the heritage sites in its care and opens them to the public. In 2010–11 there were an estimated two million visits to Cadw properties. In some cases, these are major tourist attractions and offer tours of the monuments, exhibitions and display panels. Cadw also produces books and guidebooks on many of their properties. Many of the sites are unstaffed, free to access and have interpretation boards to explain their significance. Alongside this, a mobile app was released in 2016, which provides basic information for visitors as well as an interpretative aspect for larger sites.

The five most frequently visited properties in 2010–11 were Caernarfon Castle (192,695 visits), Conwy Castle (190,031 visits), Caerphilly Castle (94,707 visits), Harlech Castle (93,242 visits) and Beaumaris Castle (80,660 visits).

To provide a better context for the history of Wales, in 2010–11 Cadw was developing thematic 'All Wales Interpretation Plans', that could develop themes across numerous sites and localities. There were eight themes:

- Origins and prehistory.
- Roman invasion and settlement.
- Celtic saints and pilgrimage.
- Churches, chapels and monastic landscapes.
- Castles and Princes of Medieval Wales.
- Artistic responses to the landscape.
- The Defence of the Realm – Pembrokeshire.
- Wales – the first industrial nation.

In 2024, a new standardised list of names for various properties Cadw manages was released, with Cadw renaming some properties such as Conwy Castle to use the Welsh name Castell Conwy, while some other properties kept an English name.

== Membership ==
Cadw Membership, formerly known as Heritage in Wales, gives the member free admission to all Cadw properties and World Heritage Sites in Wales for the length of their membership (annual or life). Other membership advantages are a free magazine (Heritage in Wales), reduced prices at the online gift shop and free entry to most Cadw-organised events. Cadw has also entered into reciprocal agreements with English Heritage, Historic Scotland and Manx National Heritage for free entry to the properties they manage.

== Events ==
Cadw organises events for adults and families. These include lectures, re-enactments of historical events, and training sessions for teachers, informing them on how to use visits to historic sites to help deliver literacy and numeracy skills and an appreciation of history.

Some 200 historical and cultural events a year are held. Cadw also provides work experience opportunities for young people, and sandwich courses for undergraduates.

Every autumn since 2014 CADW has held an Open Doors festival, with sites, buildings (and parts of buildings) being made accessible which are not normally open to the public. Though funded and organised by CADW, the event includes many non-CADW sites and generally takes place in September.

== Equivalent organisations ==
Equivalent organisations in other parts of the United Kingdom are:

- England – Historic England and English Heritage
- Scotland – Historic Environment Scotland
- Northern Ireland – Northern Ireland Environment Agency and Department for Communities (formerly the Environment and Heritage Service)
- Isle of Man – Manx National Heritage

== See also ==
- Archaeology of Wales
- Castles in Wales
- Conservation in the United Kingdom
- List of country houses in the United Kingdom
- List of monastic houses in Wales
- List of museums in Wales
- Lists of scheduled monuments in Wales
- Welsh Archaeological Trusts
