= Sites and monuments record =

In the past, each county or unitary authority in the United Kingdom maintained a sites and monuments record or SMR, consisting of a list of known archaeological sites. In the early 2000s SMRs developed into much broader historic environment records (HERs) , including information on historic buildings and designed landscapes. Each record lists the location, type and period of site, along with a brief description and information on the location of more detailed sources of information such as site reports. This information is most commonly used to help inform decisions on the likelihood of new development affecting archaeological deposits. Government guidance (formerly PPG 16 and SPP in Scotland) requires local authorities to consider archaeology a material consideration in determining planning applications and the SMR aids this consideration.

While mentioned in guidance, there is no statutory requirement for local authorities to fund an SMR (although this was a provision in the England and Wales Heritage Protection Bill) and there is great variety in implementation across the UK. Some SMRs are simple card indexes, others are command line Unix databases and others are more modern and GIS-based. They provide an enormously useful resource but are not always fully exploited or appreciated by the public. Efforts to place SMRs on-line have met with success in certain parts of Britain, although some archaeologists have voiced concern that making vulnerable sites better known to the public endangers them further, especially through illicit metal-detecting. The contrary argument is that informing the public of historic sites near them will in fact increase protection, as local people will take pride in their cultural heritage and seek to protect it. In 2007, an updated version of best practice guidance for HERs "Informing the Future of the Past: Guidelines for Historic Environment Records" has been made available on-line.

Members of the public can usually consult their local SMR, or request a search be undertaken on their behalf, and they are commonly used by local historians, archaeological organisations and academics. An increasing number of SMRs and HERs are becoming available to search on-line, in England particularly via the Heritage Gateway. In Scotland, the PASTMAP website presents comprehensive national datasets on monuments, buildings, gardens and designed landscapes, wrecks, and an increasing number of local records.

Sections 194 and 195 of the Historic Environment (Wales) Act 2023 require the Welsh Ministers to compile and keep up-to-date a publicly accessible historic environment record for each local authority area in Wales. Archwilio provides on-line public access to the Historic Environment Record (HER) for Wales. The HER is maintained on behalf of the Welsh Ministers by Heneb: the Trust for Welsh Archaeology

== See also ==
- Heritage asset
- Scheduled monument
- Northern Ireland Sites and Monuments Record
- Historic Environment Records
