= UNESCO 1970 Convention =

UNESCO international treaty on cultural property

UNESCO Convention on the Means of Prohibiting and Preventing the Illicit Import, Export and Transfer of Ownership of Cultural Property
- Official logo
- Signed: 14 November 1970
- Location: Paris, France
- Effective: 24 April 1972
- Condition: Ratification of three states
- Parties: 150
- Depositary: United Nations/UNESCO
- Language: Authoritative in English, French, Russian and Spanish
- Languages: Available in English, French, Spanish, Russian, Arabic, and Mandarin

The UNESCO 1970 Convention on the Means of Prohibiting and Preventing the Illicit Import, Export and Transfer of Ownership of Cultural Property is an international treaty to combat the illegal trade and smuggling of cultural items. It was signed on 14 November 1970 and came into effect on 24 April 1972. As of October 2026, 150 states have ratified the convention.

== History ==
After World War II, many newly independent countries grew aware of the extent of the loss in cultural objects which they had sustained during the colonial period, and began advocating for a new international framework for the transfer and restitution of cultural objects. The first instrument which UNESCO adopted for that purpose was the Recommendation on International Principles applicable to Archaeological Excavations of 1956.

The travaux préparatoires for the convention began in 1960 at the eleventh session of the UNESCO General Conference. The UNESCO member states authorized the Director-General "to prepare, in consultation with appropriate international organizations, and to submit to the General Conference at its twelfth session, a report on appropriate means of prohibiting the illicit export, import and sale of cultural property, including the possibility of preparing an international instrument on this subject".

In April 1964, UNESCO appointed a Committee of Governmental Experts from thirty states. In 1968, UNESCO adopted Resolution 3.334, authorizing the creation of a committee to draft a convention. The UNESCO Director-General appointed a principal expert and four consultants to draft the text on the convention, for later review by each member state. Upon its revision, the text was sent to a Special Committee of Governmental Experts, which prepared a final draft around April 1970.

The committee was attended by 61 states, and the convention drafted by the committee was adopted at the 16th General Conference on 14 November 1970. The turning point was the decision by the United States to support international cooperation to preserve the cultural heritage of mankind from pillage of cultural property, including import controls relating to looted archaeological and ethnological properties. The text adopted by the committee was a compromise between the comprehensive Secretariat draft and proposals tabled by the United States delegation.

== Details ==
Under the 1970 Convention, cultural property is under protection. Cultural property includes anything of scientific, historical, artistic, and or religious significance, as defined by Article I of the convention. However, every state can define its own cultural property, as long as it is an item of importance and within the categories defined in Article I.

The convention recommends the enforcement of the protection of cultural property in "three main pillars", each being preventive measures, restitution provisions, and international cooperation. The first pillar, preventive measures, states that those signed to the treaty are to enforce the security and safety of cultural property, such as taking inventory, exportation certifications, monitoring of trade, and imposition of penal sanctions. The second pillar, restitution provisions, states that each sovereign state is to assist one another in the recuperation of stolen cultural property. The third pillar, international cooperation, is an attempt by the convention to strengthen international ties between signatories, and to provide assistance and cooperation with one another.

Finally, under the convention, any party may seek the recovery and assistance of another state for the recovery of stolen or illegally exported cultural property imported into another state party, albeit only after the enforcement of the convention in both states. However, the import or export of any cultural property is not legitimized, and can still fall under the terms of the convention.

== Statutory bodies ==
Under the convention, several statutory bodies have been created to oversee the execution of the treaty's goals.

=== Meeting of States Parties ===
The Meeting of the States Parties to the 1970 Convention is the sovereign body of the convention. Made up of all the parties that are signed to the 1970 convention, this body organizes strategies and plans of action for the implementation of the convention. They met for the fourth time in May 2017.

=== Subsidiary Committee ===
The Subsidiary Committee of the Meeting of States Parties to the 1970 Convention is a statutory body of the 1970 Convention, made of 18 members from the states signed to the convention on 4-year terms, which are controlled by the Meeting of States Parties. Its main functions are to not only promote the convention, but to review and inform the Meeting of States Parties, and to identify key problems in the convention.

=== UNESCO Secretariat to the 1970 Convention ===
The UNESCO Secretariat of the 1970 Convention assists the Meetings of States Parties by organizing meetings for the Meetings of States Parties and other statutory branches of the convention and assisting in the development of resources and materials regarding the convention.

=== UNESCO Intergovernmental Committee ===
The UNESCO Intergovernmental Committee for Promoting the Return of Cultural Property to its Countries of Origin or its Restitution in Case of Illicit Appropriation (ICPRCP), or UNESCO Intergovernmental Committee, was created to provide assistance in the recuperation of cultural property that falls outside the scope of the convention. Every two years, half of its 22 members are elected for 4 year terms. As an advisory body, this committee serves the direct assistance in the retrieval of property stolen via illicit trade. It also serves as a possible place for dispute resolution.

The Intergovernmental Committee also manages the International Fund for the Return of Cultural Property to its Countries of Origin or its Restitution in Case of Illicit Appropriation.

=== UNIDROIT Convention on Stolen or Illegally Exported Cultural Objects ===
Upon UNESCO's request, UNIDROIT drafted the UNIDROIT Convention on Stolen or Illegally exported Cultural Objects. It serves as a body of private law for the international art trade to assist the efforts of the 1970 Convention, which it reinforces with legal rules. It seeks to end technical problems resulting from different laws in different states, and to contribute in the effort against illegal trade of cultural items.

== Partners ==
Several agencies and organizations have assisted the 1970 Convention, including:

- European Union
- International Council of Museums
- Interpol – Works of Art Unit
- UNIDROIT
- The United Nations Office on Drugs and Crime (UNODC)
- The World Customs Organization (WCO)

=== Non-governmental organizations ===
- The International Council of Museums (ICOM)

== Logo ==
The 1970 Convention consists of two images; a hand superimposed upon a vase. It is meant to represent the end (hand) of the illegal trade of cultural items (vase).

== See also ==
- Art repatriation
- International Institute for the Unification of Private Law
