= Catharine Titi =

Legal scholar

Catharine Titi (Greek: Κατερίνα Τιτή, Katerina Titi, born in Thessaloniki) is an international lawyer and research associate professor at the Paris-based French National Centre for Scientific Research (CNRS).

== Biography ==
She decided to study law at a young age, when she discovered the legal speeches of Lysias, an ancient Greek orator. Before joining the CNRS, she studied in Greece and London, and then went on to obtain a PhD (summa cum laude, Rolf H. Brunswig Prize) in Germany. In addition to her legal background, she has a history of art degree from the Courtauld Institute of Art.

Her work focuses on public international law, and in particular on equity in international law, international investment law, and cultural heritage law. Between 2024 and 2026, she co-chaired the Academic Forum on ISDS, a scientific society with a particular interest in the negotiations on reform of investor-state dispute settlement in the United Nations Commission on International Trade Law (UNCITRAL). She is an expert in the repatriation of cultural property and a member of the Scientific Committee of the UNESCO Chair on Threats to Cultural Heritage. In 2016, she became the first woman to be awarded the Smit-Lowenfeld Prize by the International Arbitration Club of New York (IACNY).

In her 2023 book, The Parthenon Marbles and International Law, she argued that the Parthenon Marbles currently exposed in the British Museum should be repatriated to Greece on legal grounds. Some commentators have described the work as "a tour de force on the law", "truly groundbreaking", "compelling", and "marvellously written and with a keen eye for both detail and nuance". For her engagement in the matter, French media has described her as a successor to Melina Mercouri.

In 2026, she published her first co-authored nonfiction book in Spanish, Arte secuestrado: Los mármoles del Partenón, el penacho de Moctezuma y otras historias ocultas de nuestros museos (Abducted Art: The Parthenon Marbles, Moctezuma's Headdress and Other Hidden Stories of Our Museums). She described writing in Spanish as a "wonderful" challenge.

== Selected works ==
Monographs

- The Parthenon Marbles and International Law (Springer 2023)
- The Function of Equity in International Law (Oxford University Press 2021)
- The Right to Regulate in International Investment Law (Nomos & Hart 2014)

Edited books

- The Award in International Investment Arbitration (with Katia Fach Gómez) (Oxford University Press 2024)
- Mediation in International Commercial and Investment Disputes (with Katia Fach Gómez) (Oxford University Press 2021)
- International Investment Law and Competition Law (with Anastasios Gourgourinis and Katia Fach Gómez) (Springer 2020)
- International Investment Law and the Law of Armed Conflict (with Anastasios Gourgourinis and Katia Fach Gómez) (Springer 2019)

Non-fiction (in Spanish)

- Arte secuestrado: Los mármoles del Partenón, el penacho de Moctezuma y otras historias ocultas de nuestros museos (with Katia Fach Gómez) (Península 2026)
