= UNIDROIT Convention on Stolen or Illegally Exported Cultural Objects =

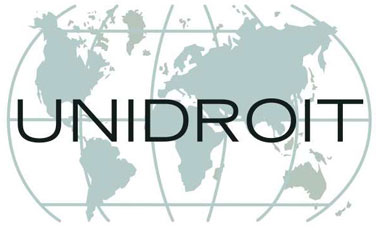
- Type: Self-executing
- Signed: June 24, 1995
- Location: Rome, Italy
- Effective: July 1, 1998
- Condition: 5 ratifications (Art. 12)
- Parties: 51
- Depositary: Italian Government
- Language: Authoritative in English and French

UNIDROIT Convention on Stolen or Illegally Exported Cultural Objects (Rome, 1995) is the international treaty on the subject of cultural property protection. It attempts to strengthen the main weaknesses of the 1970 UNESCO Convention on the Means of Prohibiting and Preventing the Illicit Import, Export and Transfer of Ownership of Cultural Property. The UNIDROIT Convention seeks to fight the illicit trafficking of cultural property by modifying the buyer's behaviour, obliging him/her to check the legitimacy of their purchase.

== Due diligence and Burden of Proof ==
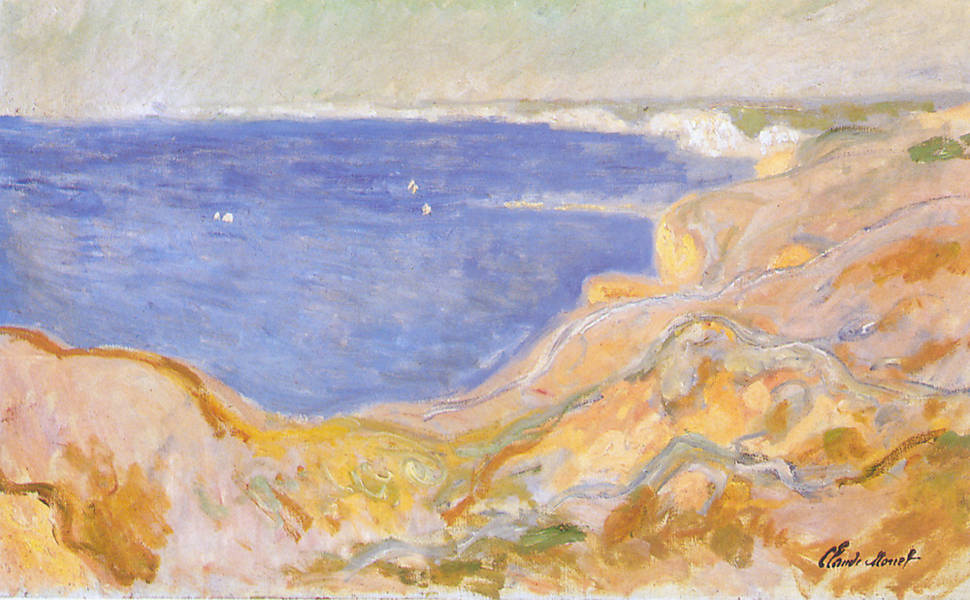
Claude Monet. Marina. Painting stolen from the Museu da Chácara do Céu, Rio de Janeiro, in 2006

The Convention states that if a cultural property was stolen it must be returned (Chapter II, Art. 3.1). Any possessor of a stolen cultural object required to return it might be compensated only if he/she can prove due diligence at the time of the purchase and that he/she neither knew nor ought reasonably to have known that the objects was stolen (Chapter II, Art. 4.1 ).

To assess the legitimacy of the object's origin, art market players can use international and national databases dedicated to cultural property protection, for instance, the INTERPOL Stolen Works of Art Database collects information about stolen cultural property and issues identification numbers to cultural objects.

Whereas Chapter II of the Convention deals with stolen cultural objects, Chapter III contemplates the export of cultural property in violation of national export restrictions. A State Party can request the competent Court of another Contracting State to order the return of a cultural object illegally exported from its territory if the removal of the object caused detriment in one of the ways listed under Article 5.3. Again, the burden of proof is on the possessor to demonstrate that he/she "neither knew nor ought reasonably to have known at the time of acquisition that the object had been illegally exported" (Art. 6.1).

These rules apply equally to cultural objects inherited or received as gifts. Either an heir or a beneficiary has the same responsibility as a buyer. Therefore, museums and other public institutions must carry out checks over the origin of donated objects.

== The 1970 UNESCO Convention and the 1995 UNIDROIT Convention ==
The UNESCO Convention on the Means of Prohibiting and Preventing the Illicit Import, Export and Transfer of Ownership of Cultural Property (1970 UNESCO Convention) and the UNIDROIT Convention are compatible and complementary. As distinct from the UNESCO Convention, the UNIDROIT Convention focuses on the recovery of cultural property. The UNIDROIT Convention establishes conditions for claims of restitution/return of stolen or illegally exported cultural objects respectively.

Although the UNIDROIT Convention follows key terminology of the 1970 UNESCO Convention, cultural goods do not need to be defined as such by the State.

Furthermore, the term "cultural property" is replaced by a more comprehensive "cultural object", but the list of their categories remains the same. The concept of "illicit export" is replaced by "illegal export", which references a prohibitive law rather than a general forbiddance.

== Time Restrictions to Claims for Repatriation ==
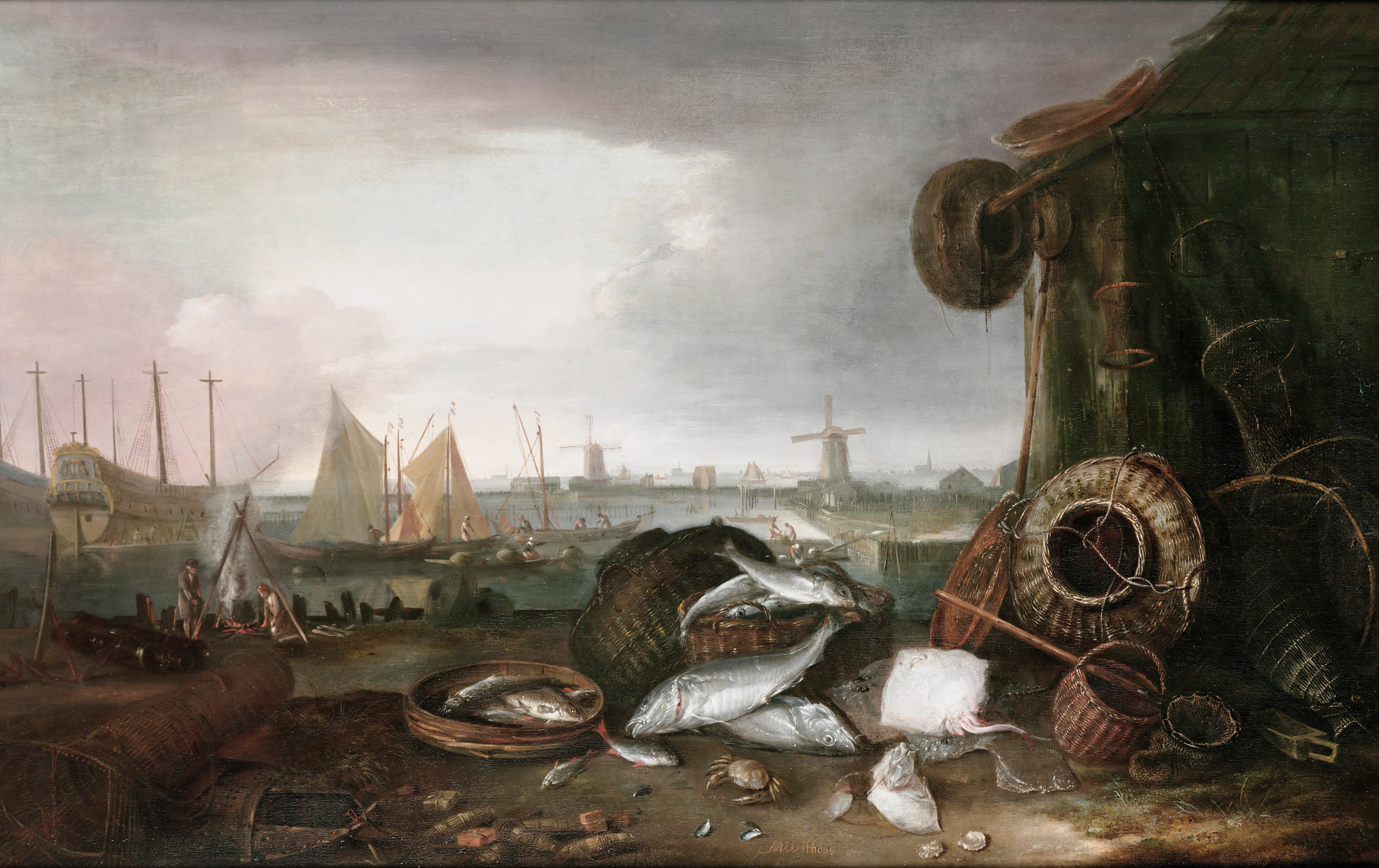
Matthias Withoos. De Grashaven. Stolen from Westfries Museum, Hoorne, in 2005

The Convention regulates the time period that an affected party may bring a claim for the restitution of stolen cultural property or the return of those illegally exported. Such a claim may be brought in three years from the time when the claimant or the requesting State knew the location of the cultural property and the identity of the possessor and in 50 years since the time of the theft, the export or from the date on which the object should have been returned (Art. 3.3 and art. 5.5 ). However, there are exceptions to this rule for stolen objects. Cultural objects that form an integral part of an identified monument or archaeological site, or which belong to a public collection are not subject to time limitation other than a period of three years (Art. 3.4). In addition, a Contracting State may declare that a claim warrants an extended time limit of 75 years or longer if so stated in its national law (Art. 3.5).

The UNIDROIT Convention is not a retroactive treaty. Its provisions only apply to cultural property stolen or illegally exported after the Convention entered into force (Art. 10). However the UNIDROIT Convention "does not in any way legitimise any illegal transaction of whatever which has taken place before the entry into force of this Convention" and does not "limit any right of a State or other person to make a claim under remedies available outside the framework" of the convention (Art. 10.3).

== See also ==
- Art repatriation
