= Moel Hebog shield =

Bronze Age shield found in Wales

- Tarian Moel Hebog
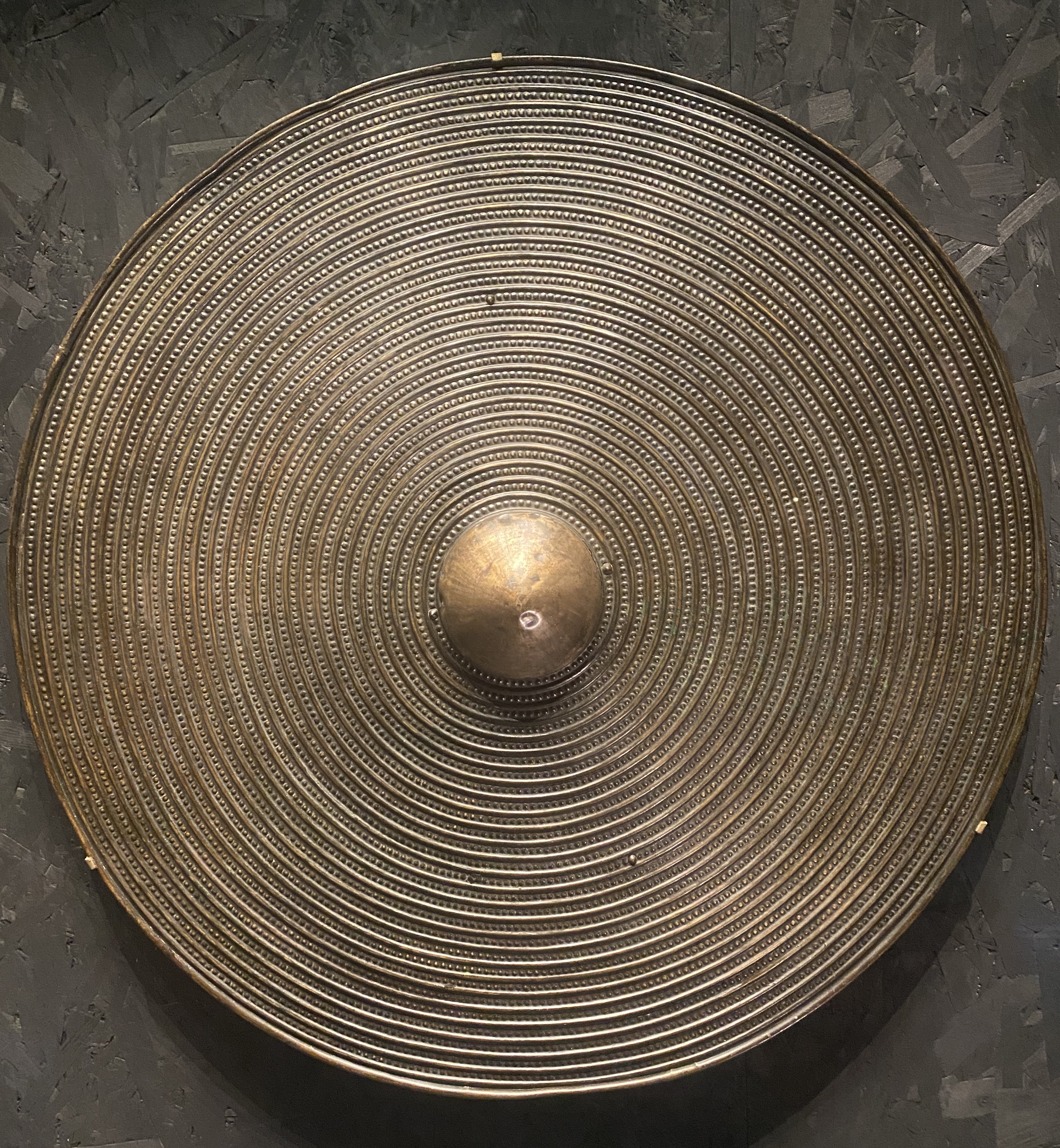
- Moel Hebog shield. Wales, 1300–1000 BC. On display at the British Museum.
- Material: Welsh sheet-bronze
- Discovered: 1300–1000 BC
- Present location: British Museum

The Moel Hebog shield (Welsh: Tarian Moel Hebog) or Moel Siabod shield is a large copper-alloy Yetholm-type shield from Bronze Age Britain, found in North Wales in 1784, and now held in storage at the British Museum in London. It dates from 1300–1000 BC.

== Description ==
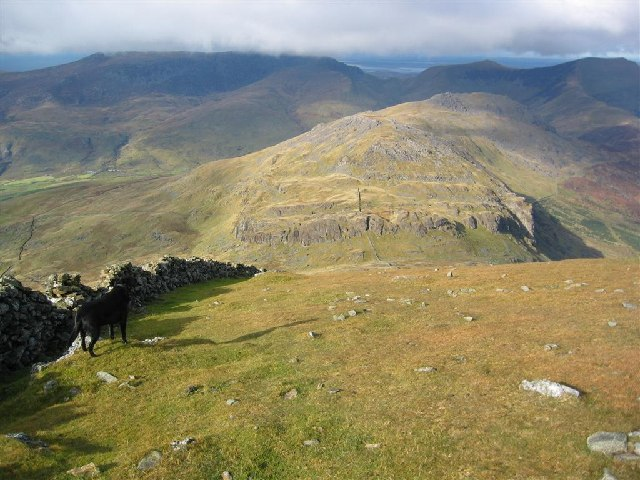
The north-west slopes of Moel Hebog towards Moel yr Ogof, Gwynedd, Wales

The late Bronze Age shield was found in a bog near Moel Hebog mountain in 1784, near Beddgelert, Snowdonia, North Wales. It was initially "given into the hands of Mr. Williams of Llanidan", MP and copper mining magnate. It is now held in the British Museum's collection, but is not on public display. Other sources point to a finding on Moel Siabod.

Only 25 shields of this type are known from Britain and Ireland, and the Moel Hebog shield is one of only two discovered in Wales. The other Welsh shield, the Rhos Rydd Shield, was found at Rhos Rydd, Aberllolwyn, Aberystwyth, in Ceredigion.

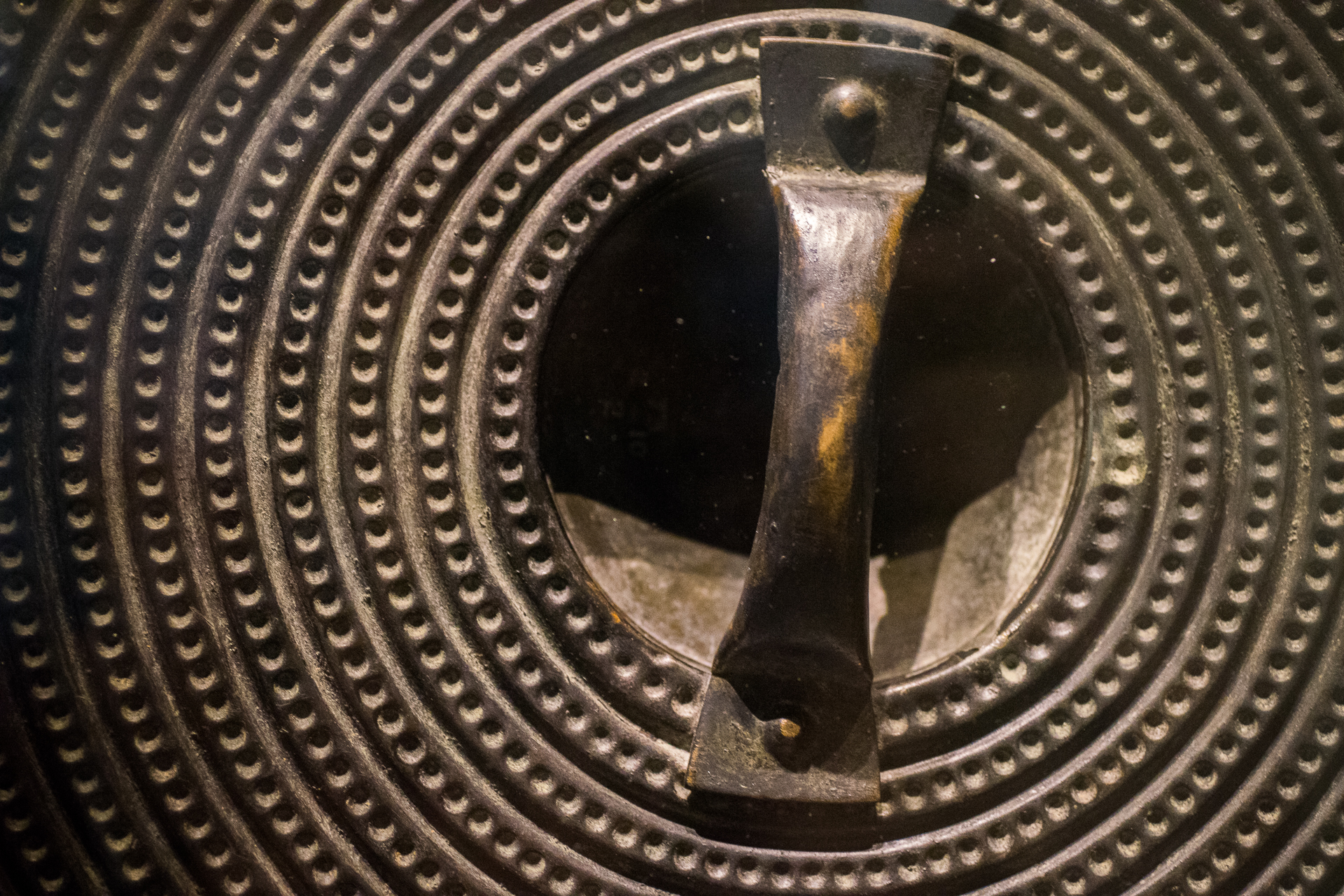
Back of Moel Hebog shield showing handle.

The shield is made from a single disc of bronze, hammered into a circular shape with a conical boss at the centre, surrounded by 27 concentric rows and ribs. The conical boss has a handle attached at its back and the entire shield is 64cm in diameter. It is considered to be in perfect condition.

Richard Blurton wrote of the shield in the book The Enduring Image: Treasures from the British Museum, "This shield is a splendid example, representative of the rise of large sheet-bronze work in later Bronze Age Europe. Much effort was directed towards the production of ceremonial metal armour indicating the prevalence of the idea of man as a warrior."

A copy of the Moel Hebog shield is owned by Amgueddfa Cymru - Museum Wales but is not on display.

There have been calls for this and other artefacts to be returned to Wales.

== See also ==
- Archaeology of Wales
