= Yetholm =

Parish in Scotland

Coordinates: 55°32′50″N 2°16′25″W

- Location within the Scottish Borders
- Population: 620 (2020)
- Council area: Scottish Borders
- Country: Scotland
- Sovereign state: United Kingdom
- Police: Scotland
- Fire: Scottish
- Ambulance: Scottish

Yetholm is the parish that contained the villages of Kirk Yetholm and Town Yetholm in the east of the former county of Roxburghshire, nowadays in the Scottish Borders.

The region gives its name to the Yetholm-type shield, a distinctive type of shield dating from the Bronze Age discovered in a peat bog in the area.
