= Blaenplwyf =

Village in Ceredigion, Wales

Coordinates: 52.36010°N 4.09065°W

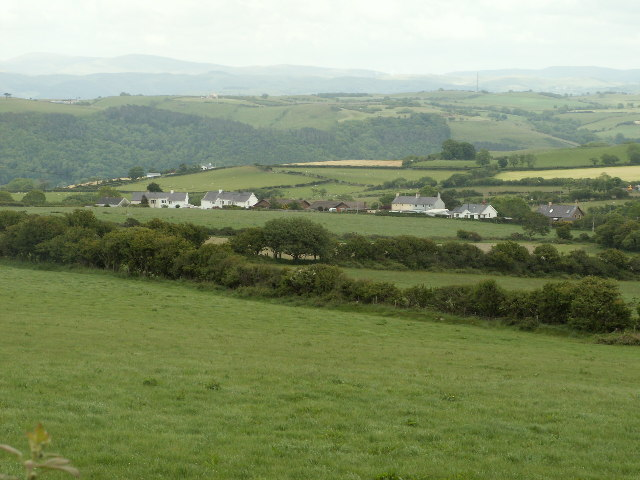
Blaenplwyf village

Blaenplwyf (Pontllanio previously) is a village in Ceredigion, to the southwest of Aberystwyth. It is noted for the Blaenplwyf transmitting station, which serves Aberystwyth and Cardigan Bay area. It was originally built by the BBC in 1956–7, serving as a main transmitter for BBC Band II VHF FM radio. Blaenplwyf contains a small stone and brick former Mission Church, dated to 1878, which is now a church. The Calvinistic Methodist Chapel, a yellow and brown Victorian church built by David Williams of Aberystwyth, also dates to 1878.

In 2002, residents of the village joined forces to prevent the local shop and post office being shut down by applying for a grant from the EU and buying it.

During peat cutting at Rhos Rydd in 1804, workers discovered an incredibly rare 3,000-year old late Bronze Age shield. It is known as a "Yetholm type". Only 22 examples exist across Britain and Ireland, and only 3 in all of Wales.
