= Welsh artefacts in museums outside Wales =

Archaeological repatriation

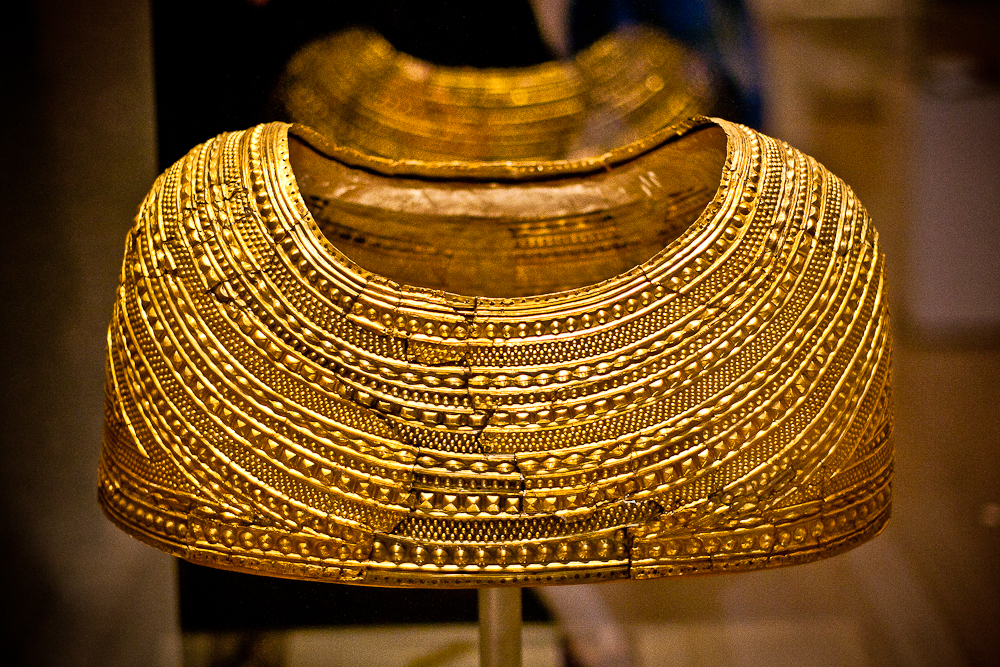
The Gold Mold Cape (held in London, England)

Various artefacts originally found in or culturally important to Wales, are housed in museums outside the country, namely in England and France. Their housing outside of Wales has been controversial to some in Wales, calling for some artefacts to be repatriated (returned) back to Wales, while others argue Wales lacks the necessary museums and security for the artefacts to be housed in Wales safely.

== Welsh artefacts held in England ==
=== Mold Gold Cape ===
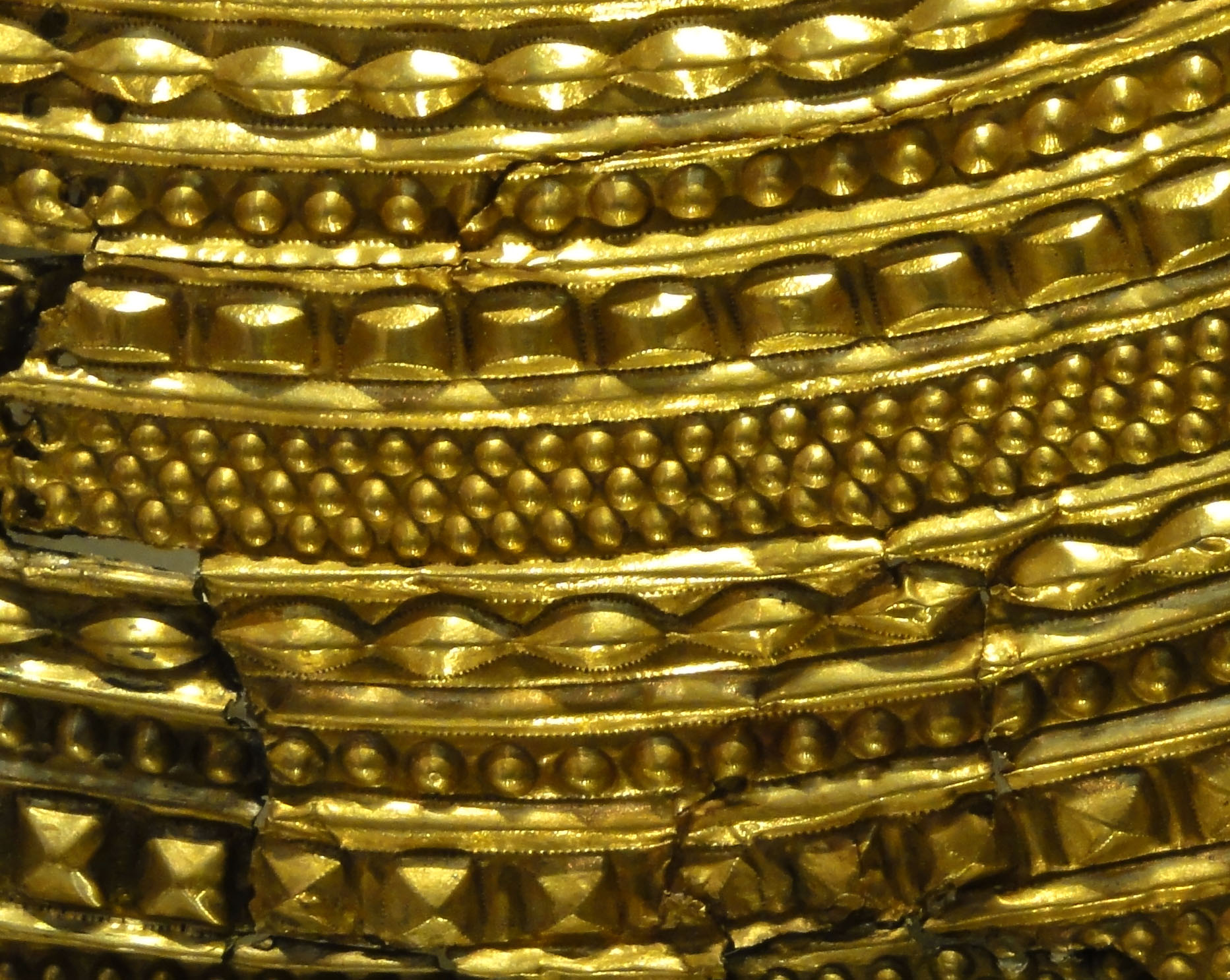
Mold Cape detail

Local politicians including two Delyn Assembly Members, Alison Halford, and Hannah Blythyn, Denbighshire councillor Mabon ap Gwynfor, former librarian of the National Library of Wales Andrew Green, the Celtic League and Plaid Cymru Westminster leader Elfyn Llwyd have called for the Mold gold cape to be repatriated back to Wales. It is currently housed in the British Museum in London, England. Halford stated in 2002 that a legitimate claim for the artefact could have been made if there were a suitable museum in north Wales which would address any security concerns. The artefact was temporarily returned to Wales on loan in 2013, with local tourism chair expressing his disappointment with being unable to have it permanently return, and hopeful a new local museum can house it in the future.

=== Red Lady of Paviland ===
A two-century campaign has been calling for the Red Lady of Paviland to be repatriated to Wales. The artefact (which are actually of a man) was discovered in 1823 by William Buckland, geology professor at Oxford University, and it was quickly transported to Oxford thereafter (some other artefacts were later repatriated). Swansea councillor Ioan Richard in 2004, started a campaign for its repatriation. In 2006, the artefact was announced it would be temporarily loaned to the National Museum of Wales. Former chairman of the Welsh Conservatives, Byron Davies also called for the artefact to "come home" in 2013, and called for a bid to be put together for repatriation, repeating his commitment in 2023, although said there were safety and expense concerns. Liverpool professor George Nash, while questioning mysticism over the artefact stated as it is important to Welsh history, returning it would "be the right thing to do". In January 2023, it was nicknamed the Welsh Elgin Marbles, after the Greek artefact facing similar calls. It is currently on display in the University of Oxford’s Museum of Natural History, and is described to be "well cared for".

In May 2023, local campaigner and writer, Mathew Smith called for the oldest ceremonially buried skeleton in Western Europe to be brought back, "This is something for Swansea, it's something for south Wales. The Red Lady should come back here. Oxford have done a fantastic job for the past two-hundreds years, but now in the twenty-first century, it really is time to change things."

=== Bardsey crown ===
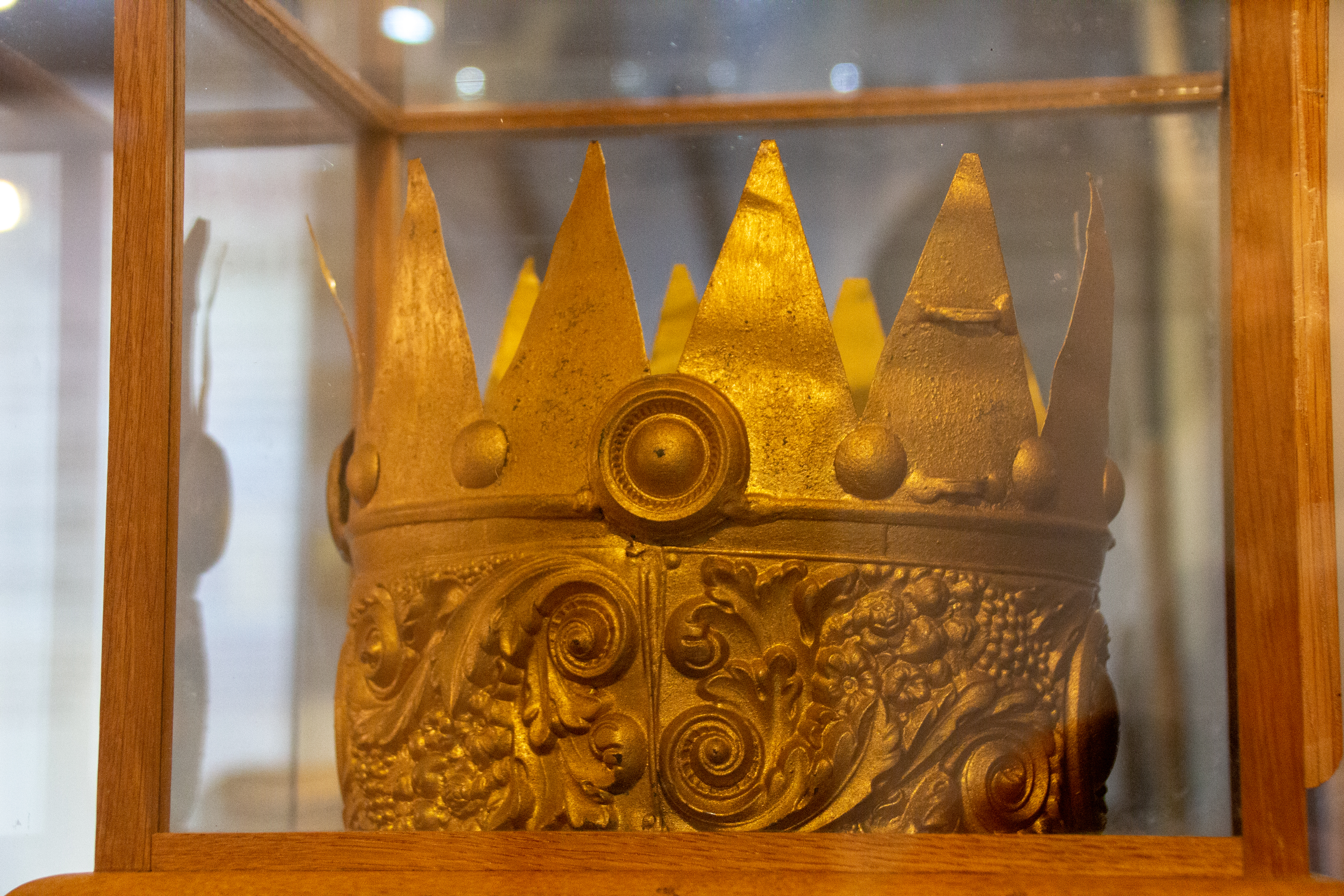
Bardsey (Enlli) crown (held in Liverpool, England)

Welsh pressure group Cyfeillion Llyn (Friends of Llyn) have called for the return of the Bardsey (Enlli) crown, discovered on Bardsey Island. The group want the crown to be moved to Oriel Plas Glyn-y-Weddw, in Llanbedrog. It is currently held in National Museums Liverpool, in Liverpool, England.

=== Other Welsh archaeological objects held in England ===
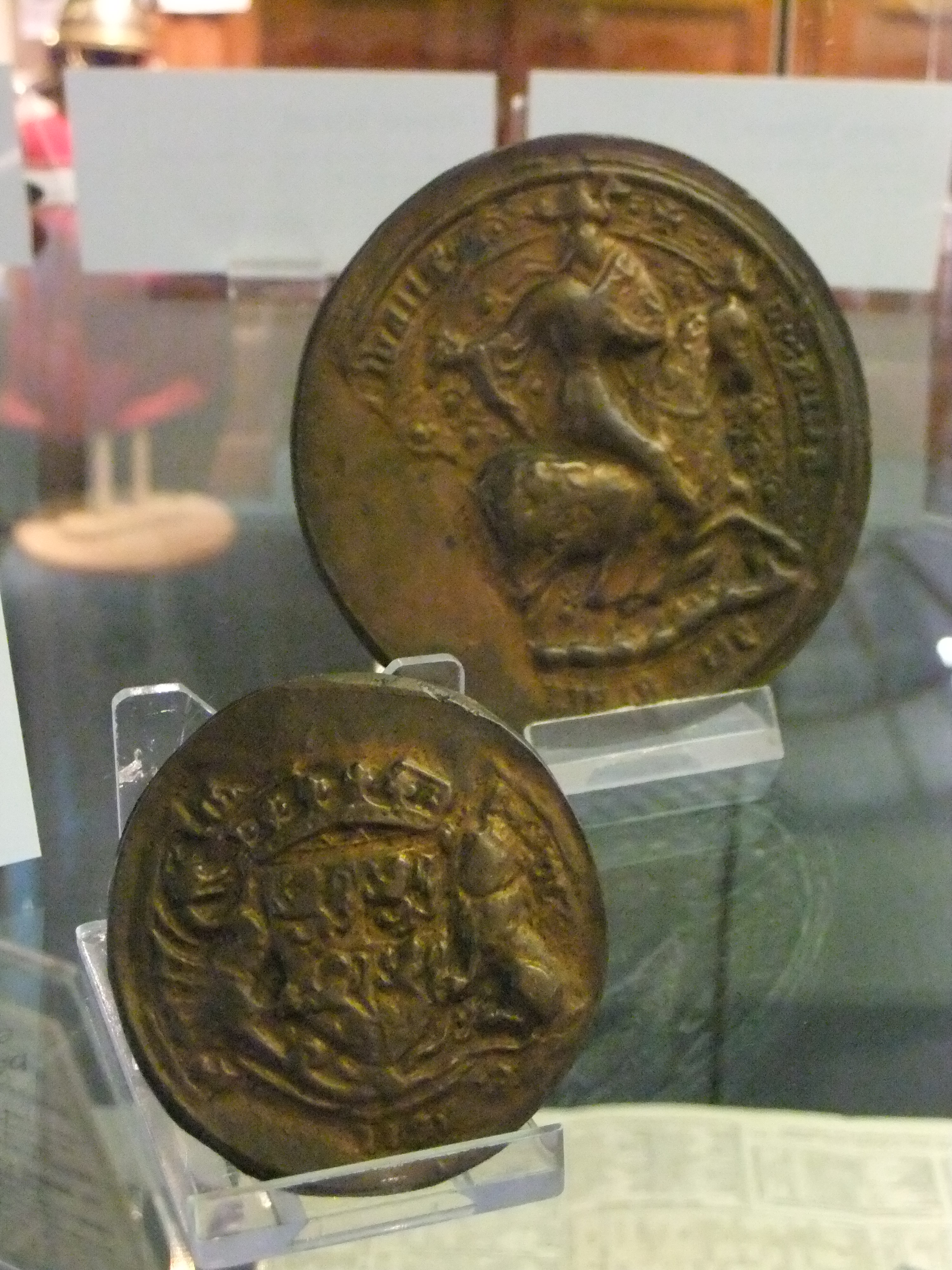
Owain Glyndŵr seal impressions, (held in Hereford, England)

- Red Book of Hergest – held in Jesus College of Oxford University, Oxford, England
- Rhyd-y-gors Shield – held in the British Museum, London, England
- Moel Hebog shield – held in the British Museum, London, England
- Llanllyfni lunula – held in the British Museum, London, England
- Trawsfynydd Tankard – held in National Museums Liverpool, Liverpool, England

== Welsh artefacts held outside of the United Kingdom ==
=== Laws of Hywel Dda ===
The 14th century book, "Laws of Hywel Dda" (also known as the "Boston Manuscript"), was owned by the Massachusetts Historical Society of Boston and held in the USA until it was put up for sale by auction in 2012. The National Library of Wales was able to buy it at Sotheby's for £541,250, with help from the Heritage Lottery Fund, Friends of the National Libraries and the Welsh Government. It was then returned to Wales and put on display in Aberystwyth in Summer 2012 before being digitised for wider access. The book was a record of the 10th century laws of Hywel Dda, King of Deheubarth.

=== Pennal Letter ===
There have been calls to repatriate the Pennal Letter sent to the king of France by Owain Glyndŵr in 1406, as it is currently housed in the French National Library in Paris, France. In 1999, 28 members signed an early day motion to the House of Commons, calling for the letter and seal to be repatriated because of its "great historical significance in Wales as rare treasures of Welsh history". Politicians such as Paul Flynn, Alun Michael and Ron Davies supported the motion. The letter was displayed in a National Library of Wales exhibition in 2000. Welsh singer Gwilym Bowen Rhys made similar calls in 2022.

== General calls for repatriation ==
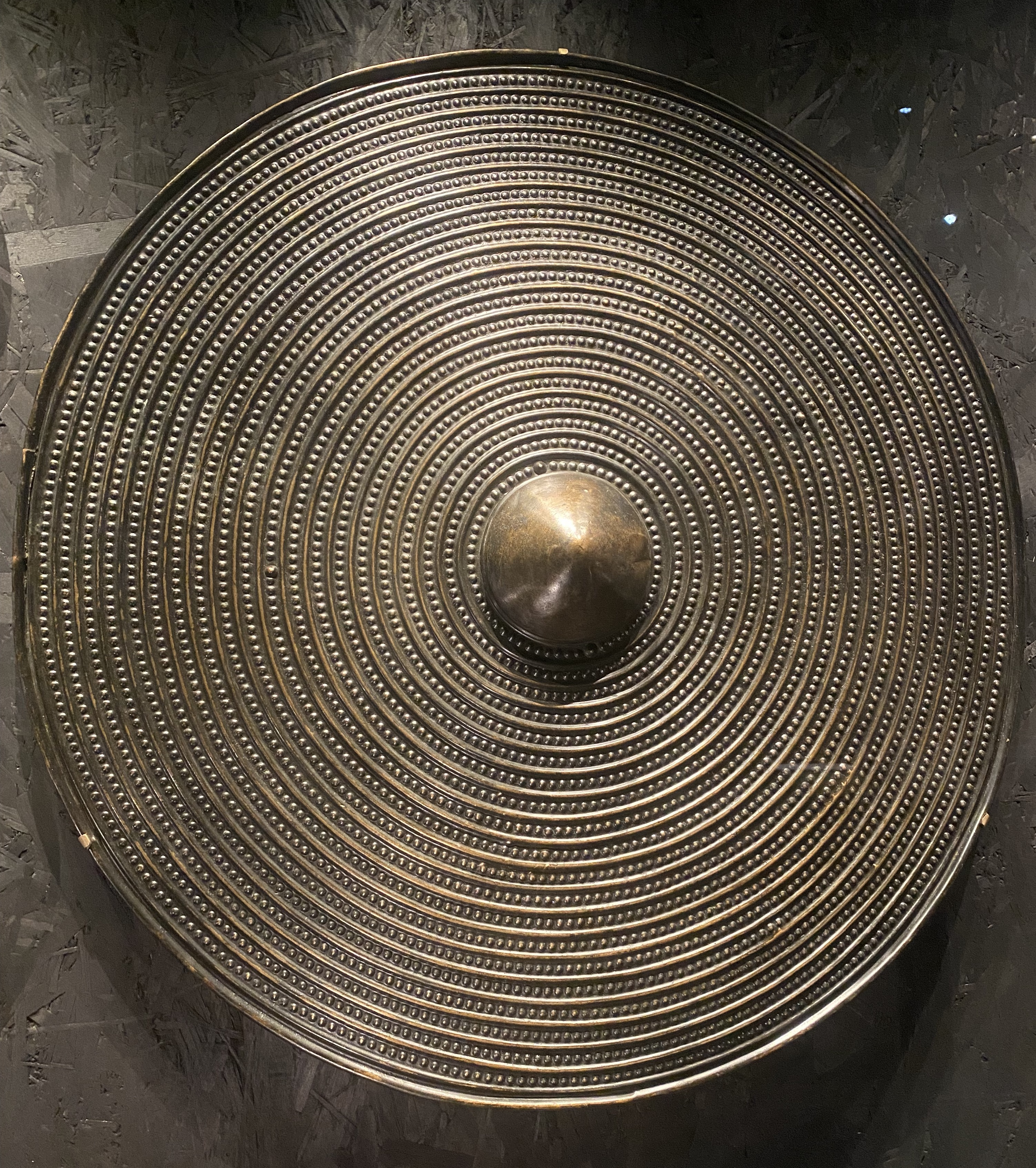
Rhyd y Gors shield (held in London, England)

There have been calls in Welsh media to return some of the more significant artefacts which were discovered in Wales. These include artefacts from the British Museum, such as the Rhyd-y-gors shield, Moel Hebog shield and Welsh buckler shields. There are also calls to return the Mold Cape (currently housed in London), Llanllyfni lunula, the Trawsfynydd Tankard (in Liverpool), Red Book of Hergest (in Oxford) and the Red Lady of Paviland (in Oxford), Bardsey crown (in Liverpool), and Owain Glyndŵr's Pennal Letter (in Paris, France) to a museum in Wales.

Historian John Davies noted that "Our treasures are vital to us as a nation and draw people together. They help people imagine the period, and shape how people feel about their area", but "sometimes the expertise is not here in Wales so we have to ask how to deal with that if the treasures come home".

In 2011, it was stated by Linda Tomos, the Director of CyMAL: Museums Archives and Libraries Wales, in response to a query from the Celtic League on the Rhayader Treasure, that the calling for the return of artefacts was not part of the Welsh Government's strategy at the time.

Following reports some artefacts were stolen from the British Museum in August 2023, Plaid Cymru MP Liz Saville Roberts and MS Heledd Fychan, repeated calls for repatriation from the British Museum. They stated that the museum's argument that it is the most secure location, no longer holds, and that the National Museum of Wales Cardiff is a more safe location for artefacts such as the Mold Gold Cape and the Rhos Rydd Shield. Amgueddfa Cymru – Museum Wales stated that repatriation issues should be treated separately from security concerns. The National Museum does not explicitly call for the return of artefacts, but stated they should be more accessible and appreciated by Welsh communities. Many artefacts were transferred to the British Museum before the establishment of Wales' national museum.

== See also ==
- Powis Castle § Clive Museum – Museum in Wales facing calls to repatriate South Asian artefacts
