= Bowmont Water =

Stream in the Scottish Borders and Northumberland, England

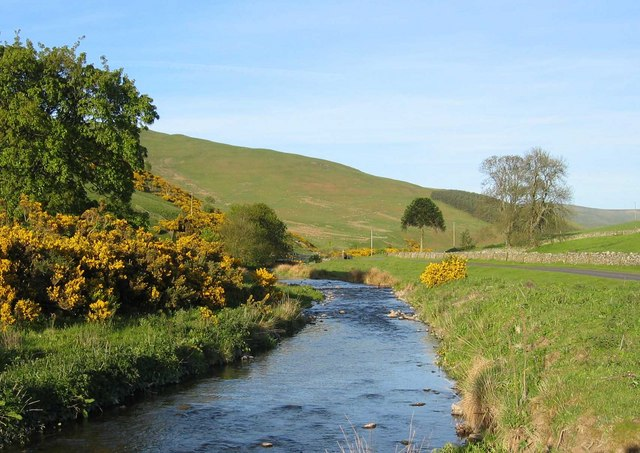
- Bowmont Water near Mowhaugh

- Location within Northumberland

Location
- Country: United Kingdom
- County: Northumberland

Physical characteristics
- Mouth
  - coordinates: 55.571°N 2.149°W

Bowmont Water is a stream in the Scottish Borders and Northumberland, England.

It rises in the Cheviot Hills and flows by Mowhaugh, Town Yetholm, and Kirk Yetholm. It then crosses the Anglo-Scottish border and continues past Mindrum Mill, Mindrum Station, Thornington, and finally to Lanton Mill where it joins College Burn to form the River Glen.

Scottish Border poet and Australian bush balladeer Will H. Ogilvie (1869–1963) in his first anthology Fair girls and gray horses (1898) fondly reflected on the land of his heritage while in Australia (1889–1901), penning a five stanza of the same name.

We have wandered down the valley

In the days of buried time,

Seen the foxgloves dip and dally,

Heard the fairy blue-bells chime;

Seen the brier roses quiver

When the West-wind crossed the dell,

Heard the music of the river

And the tale it had to tell,

Where the melody Love taught her

Is the laverock's only lay,

At the foot of Bowmont Water,

Bowmont Water — far away!

== See also ==
- List of rivers of Scotland
- List of rivers of England
