= Scottish National Trail =

The Scottish National Trail is a 864-kilometre (537 mi) long-distance trail between Kirk Yetholm in the Scottish Borders and Cape Wrath in the far north of the Scottish Highlands.

The trail starts in Kirk Yetholm, at the end of the Pennine Way. The route combines sections of other well known long distance walking routes including St Cuthbert's Way, the Southern Upland Way, the Forth and Clyde Canal Pathway, the West Highland Way, the Rob Roy Way and the Cape Wrath Trail.

Created by walker Cameron McNeish, it is the first walking route to run the length of Scotland. The route takes two months to walk. McNeish said he was inspired to launch the trail after visiting Nepal in 2011, when they had just announced the creation of the Great Himalayan Trail. The trail was officially launched on 30 October 2012 by First Minister Alex Salmond.
