= Cameron McNeish =

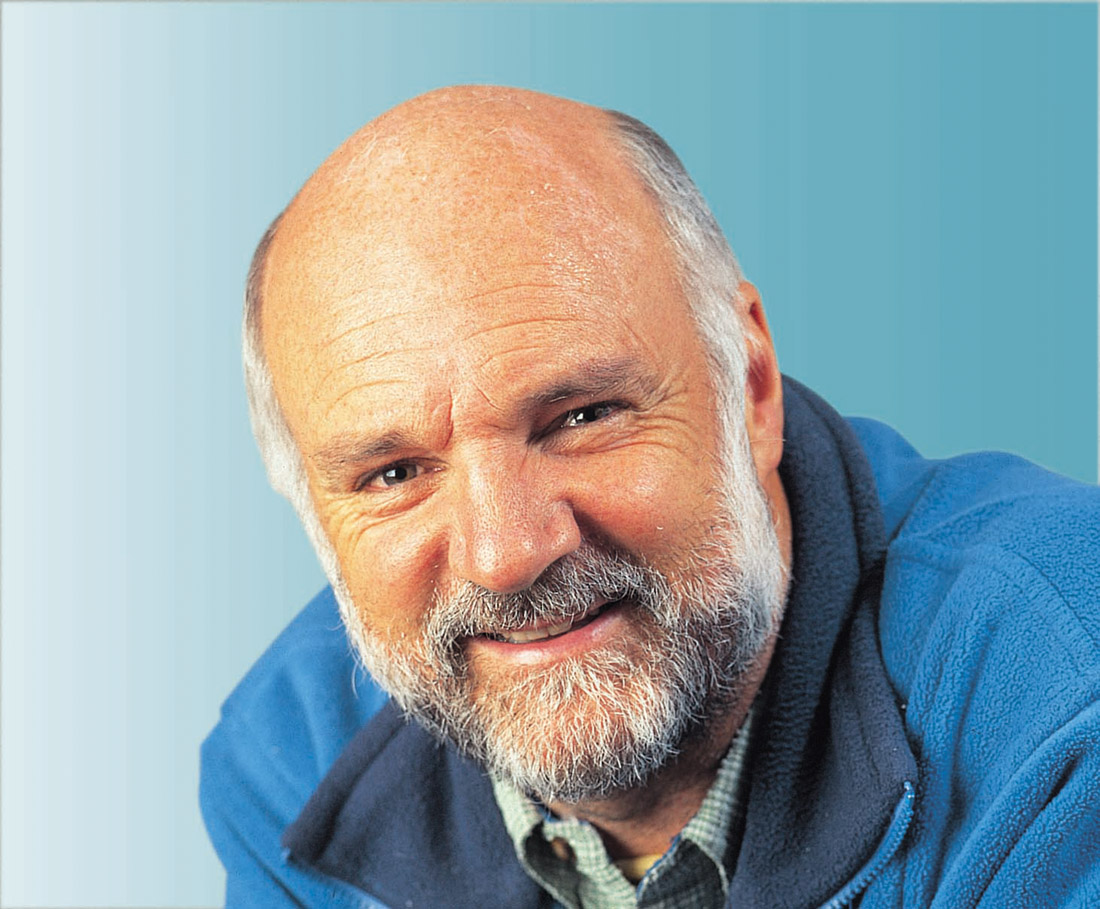
Cameron McNeish.

Cameron McNeish FRSGS is a Scottish wilderness hiker, backpacker and mountaineer who is an authority on outdoor pursuits. In this field he is best known as an author and broadcaster although he is also a magazine editor, lecturer and after dinner speaker as well as being an adviser to various outdoor organisations.

== Early days ==
McNeish was brought up in Glasgow in Scotland and did much of his early walking as a youth in the Campsie Fells. As his confidence grew, he moved further afield to bigger mountains and his first Munro was Ben Lomond. For a number of years McNeish worked for the Scottish Youth Hostels Association as a warden and for a period ran the busy hostel at Aviemore, in his early years he also worked as a ski and climbing instructor. 1978 saw the publication of his first book, "Highland Ways" which was about backpacking in Scotland. In 1982 he started a weekly outdoor column in his local newspaper the Strathspey and Badenoch Herald,which he contributed to for 32 years, called "McNeish at Large" and in the same year co-founded the outdoor magazine Footloose with two colleagues.

== In the media ==
In 1985, he became editor of Climber and Rambler magazine, leaving in 1991 to become editor of TGO Magazine (formerly The Great Outdoors). In 1999 he became outdoor correspondent of the Sunday Herald writing the weekly Peak Practice column for 15 years. Throughout the late 1980s, McNeish contributed and wrote regularly for outdoor programmes on BBC Radio Scotland, most notably In The Country and in 1991 he scripted and hosted The Munro Challenge for BBC Radio 4 to celebrate 100 years of the Munro Tables. During this time Cameron was still writing books and the immensely popular The Munros Almanac and The Munros: Scotland’s Highest Mountains were released in the 1990s.

In 1994, McNeish moved into television, presenting the BAFTA-winning The Edge: One Hundred Years of Scottish Mountaineering and in the same year The Great Outdoors, a six-part series for Channel 4. His best known television work is the Wilderness Walks programmes that he made for BBC Two: the first series was broadcast in 1997 and the second in 1998. McNeish was a consultant and guest on the 2007 series Mountain. In the first programme he guides series presenter Griff Rhys Jones to the summit of Scotland's most northerly Munro, Ben Hope, in a snowstorm. He is also a regular contributor to the BBC Scotland series, The Adventure Show. After a break of a number of years from book writing, McNeish released "The Sutherland Trail: A Journey Through Scotland's North-west" in August 2009 in conjunction with photographer and film maker Richard Else. The book is a description of a week-long walking route through Sutherland, in the far north-west of Scotland. That book was followed by others co-authored with Richard Else - The Skye Trail and Scotland End to End. In 2018 Cameron produced an autobiography, There's Always the Hills, published by Sandstone Press. That book became TGO (The Great Outdoors Magazine) Book of the Year 2018.

== Travels ==
Cameron McNeish has hiked, backpacked, skied and climbed in many of the remote places in the world. These include the Alps, the Pyrenees, Spain, Iceland, North America, Norway, Sweden, Pakistan, India, Nepal, Central America, Slovenia, Russia, Guatemala, Corsica, Jordan and Turkey. Despite this most of his walking is done in the Scottish Highlands collecting data for his newspaper columns and creating podcasts for his personal website. Cameron completed his first round of the Scottish Munros in 1991 becoming Munroist no. 913. He completed his second round in 1996 and a third round in 2008.

Cameron McNeish FRSGS is vice-president of the Ramblers' Association in Scotland, Patron of Mountain Aid and a Patron of Orienteering Scotland. In 2021 he became Patron of the Perth & Kinross Conservation Trust. He is an Honorary Fellow of the Royal Scottish Geographical Society.

== Views on Scottish Independence ==
Cameron McNeish is a supporter of the YES campaign.

"I'm well aware that we are being warned not to get too emotional about independence but dammit, I'm going to get a little emotional. I love this country with a passion. I love its hills and mountains and lochs and coastlines, I love its culture and its music and its traditions, and I'm fed up with it being treated as a mere region, the Winterfell of Britain. Let's go from here and tell our friends and our families, our workmates and our neighbours that Scotland can prosper as an independent country. Don't leave it to the politicians – they've got enough to do. It's up to us, you and me. As they say in the Nike advert – just do it…"

However, in July 2021 he resigned his membership of the Scottish National Party, accusing its leadership of neglecting land reform and the environment since Nicola Sturgeon became First Minister. He also castigated the party's treatment of Joanna Cherry MP and other women over their stance on women's rights.

== Works ==
- Highland Ways, Newcastle upon Tyne: Kate Spencer Agency, 1978, ISBN 0-9506493-0-9
- The Spur Book Of Youth Hostelling, Bourne End: Spurbooks, 1978, ISBN 0-904978-98-2
- The Spur Master Guide To Snow Camping, Bourne End: Spurbooks, 1980, ISBN 0-904978-42-7
- Ski The Nordic Way, Milnthorpe: Cicerone Press, 1981, ISBN 0-902363-32-8
- Backpacker’s Scotland, London: Hale, 1982, ISBN 0-7091-9878-7
- Backpacker’s Manual, Oxford: Oxford Illustrated Press, 1984, ISBN 0-946609-01-2
- Northern Scotland (Lets Walk There), Poole: Javelin, 1987, ISBN 0-7137-1770-X
- Classic Walks In Scotland, Sparkford: Oxford Illustrated, c.1988, ISBN 1-85509-229-8 (with Roger Smith)
- The Book Of The Climbing Year, Wellingborough: Stephens, 1988, ISBN 1-85260-043-8 (Editor)
- The Best Hill Walking in Scotland, Moffat: Lochar, 1990, ISBN 0-948403-30-6
- Scotland (Walking in Britain), London: New Orchard, 1991, ISBN 1-85079-168-6 (with Atholl Innes)
- The Munro Almanac, Glasgow: Neil Wilson, 1991, ISBN 1-897784-39-2
- 25 Walks: The Trossachs, Edinburgh: H.M.S.O., 1994, ISBN 0-11-495166-7
- The Corbett Almanac, Glasgow: Neil Wilson, 1994, ISBN 1-897784-14-7
- The Edge, 100 Years of Scottish Mountaineering, London: BBC Books, 1994, ISBN 0-563-37084-X (with Richard Else)
- The Munros, Scotland's Highest Mountains, Edinburgh: Lomond Books, 1996, ISBN 1-900455-13-7
- Wilderness Walks, London: BBC Books, 1997, ISBN 0-563-37176-5
- More Wilderness Walks, London: BBC, 1998, ISBN 0-563-38450-6
- Scotland’s 100 Best Walks, Edinburgh: Lomond Books, 1999, ISBN 0-947782-66-4
- The Wilderness World Of Cameron McNeish, Glasgow: Inn Pin, 2001, ISBN 1-903238-30-7
- The Sutherland Trail, Mountain Media, 2009, ISBN 0-9562957-0-3 (with Richard Else)
- The Skye Trail: A Journey Through the Isle of Skye, Mountain Media, 2010, ISBN 0-95629-571-1 (with Richard Else)
- Scotland End to End: Walking the Gore-tex Scottish National Trail, Mountain Media, 2012, ISBN 0956295738, 9780956295736 (with Richard Else)
- There's Always the Hills, Sandstone Press, 2018, ISBN 9781910985953 (with a foreword by Sam Heughan)
- Come By The Hills, Sandstone Press, 2020, ISBN 9781913207281

== Awards ==
In 2010 Cameron was given a Lifetime Achievement Award by PPA (Professional Publishers Association) Scotland for his services to magazine publishing and in 2015 he was given a Lifetime Achievement Award by the National Adventure Awards.

In 2015 Cameron was presented with the Oliver Brown Award by the Scots Independent newspaper for his work in showcasing Scotland.

In 2018 he was the recipient of the annual Scottish Award for Excellence in Mountain Culture.

He is an honorary Fellow of the Royal Scottish Geographical Society.
