= Mowhaugh =

Village in Scottish Borders, Scotland, UK

Coordinates: 55.4805°N 2.2930°W

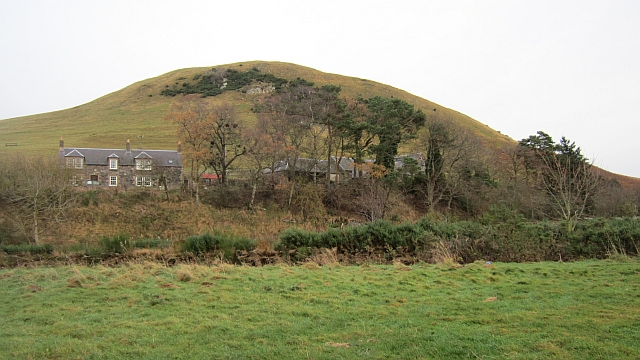
Mowhaugh, with Mow Law hill behind

Mowhaugh is a hamlet and farm steading near the Calroust Burn and the Bowmont Water, near Morebattle, in the Scottish Borders area of Scotland, and in the former Roxburghshire. It is situated about 5 miles (8 km) from the Anglo-Scottish Border.

== History ==
The recorded history of 'Mow' or 'Molle' dates back to the 7th century, when it was granted with other lands and settlements on the Bowmont Water to Lindisfarne. In the Middle Ages it was a substantial settlement with a large population, a peel tower, and many farmsteads around it. The monks of Kelso Abbey held fourteen cottages, each of which rented for two shillings yearly and six days' work.

The church of Molle stood on the summit of high ground on the right bank of the Bowmont Water. It was recorded as early as the 12th century, but by 1607 was said to be ruinous. Today, all that remains is a small graveyard.

Mow Parish is now Morebattle parish, and Mowhaugh, the remains of Mow Tower, and the hill of Mow Law, are marked on OS maps. The area is part of the Roxburghe Estate Farms.

== See also ==
- List of places in the Scottish Borders
