= Town Yetholm =

Village in Scotland

Coordinates: 55.545°N 2.286°W

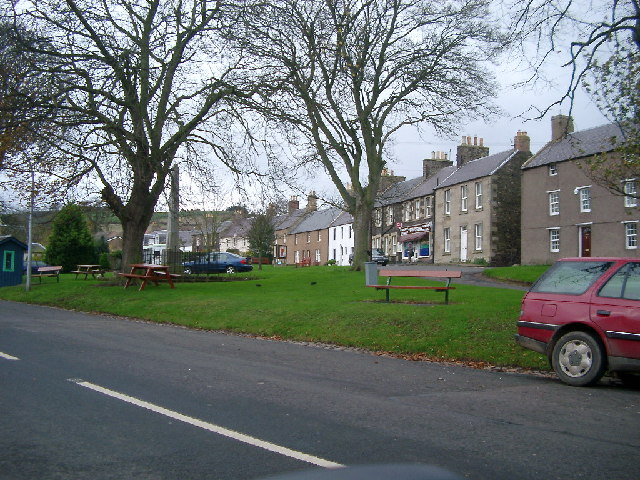
- Town Yetholm (November 2005)

- Location within the Scottish Borders
- Population: 469 (2001)
- OS grid reference: NT8128
- Civil parish: Yetholm
- Council area: Scottish Borders
- Lieutenancy area: Roxburgh, Ettrick and Lauderdale
- Country: Scotland
- Sovereign state: United Kingdom
- Post town: KELSO
- Postcode district: TD5
- Dialling code: 01573
- Police: Scotland
- Fire: Scottish
- Ambulance: Scottish
- UK Parliament: Berwickshire, Roxburgh and Selkirk
- Scottish Parliament: Ettrick, Roxburgh and Berwickshire

Yelthom, Officially Town Yetholm ('town yet-ham'), is a small village in the Scottish Borders in the valley of the Bowmont Water opposite Kirk Yetholm. The town colours are green and yellow.

The centre of the small village is made up of the village green surrounded by the village shop, the Plough Hotel Public House a few houses to the south and a row of terraced dwellings to the north, separated from the green by the Main Street. The village has many notable houses with impressive views. The Wauchope Hall is situated at the east end of the main street next to Gibsons Garage. The Wauchope family had estates in the area, and an obelisk remembers Major-General Andrew Wauchope CB CMG (1846–1899) who was killed in the South African War.

Every year, in June the village holds a festival week to celebrate the village and the people within. Two respectable young adults are chosen to represent the village during its own festival and others around the Scottish Borders. They are named from the Romani language, Bari Gadgi (best boy) and Bari Manushi (best girl).

Every year on a Saturday in July the village plays host to several hundred visitors from the larger town of Kelso during the town's "Civic Week" festival. On this day the Kelsae Laddie, his left and right hand men and a cavalcade of about 200 horses ride their way to Kirk Yetholm via Hoselaw and the Venchen Hill. After a welcome and a toast the cavalcade moves across the Bowmont Water to Town Yetholm for lunch. After lunch in the Plough Hotel for the principals, and picnics on the green for rest of the visitors, the piper plays a reel which is danced by the Laddie and his right and left hand men joined by the Bari Gadgi and Bari Manushi. The visitors leave during the afternoon.

The first Saturday in October is traditionally the Yetholm Border Shepherds' Show, held on the land between Town Yetholm and Kirk Yetholm, with the 156th show held in 2019. It stemmed from the old practice of farmers gathering to sort through stray sheep from neighbours' flocks.

== Gallery ==
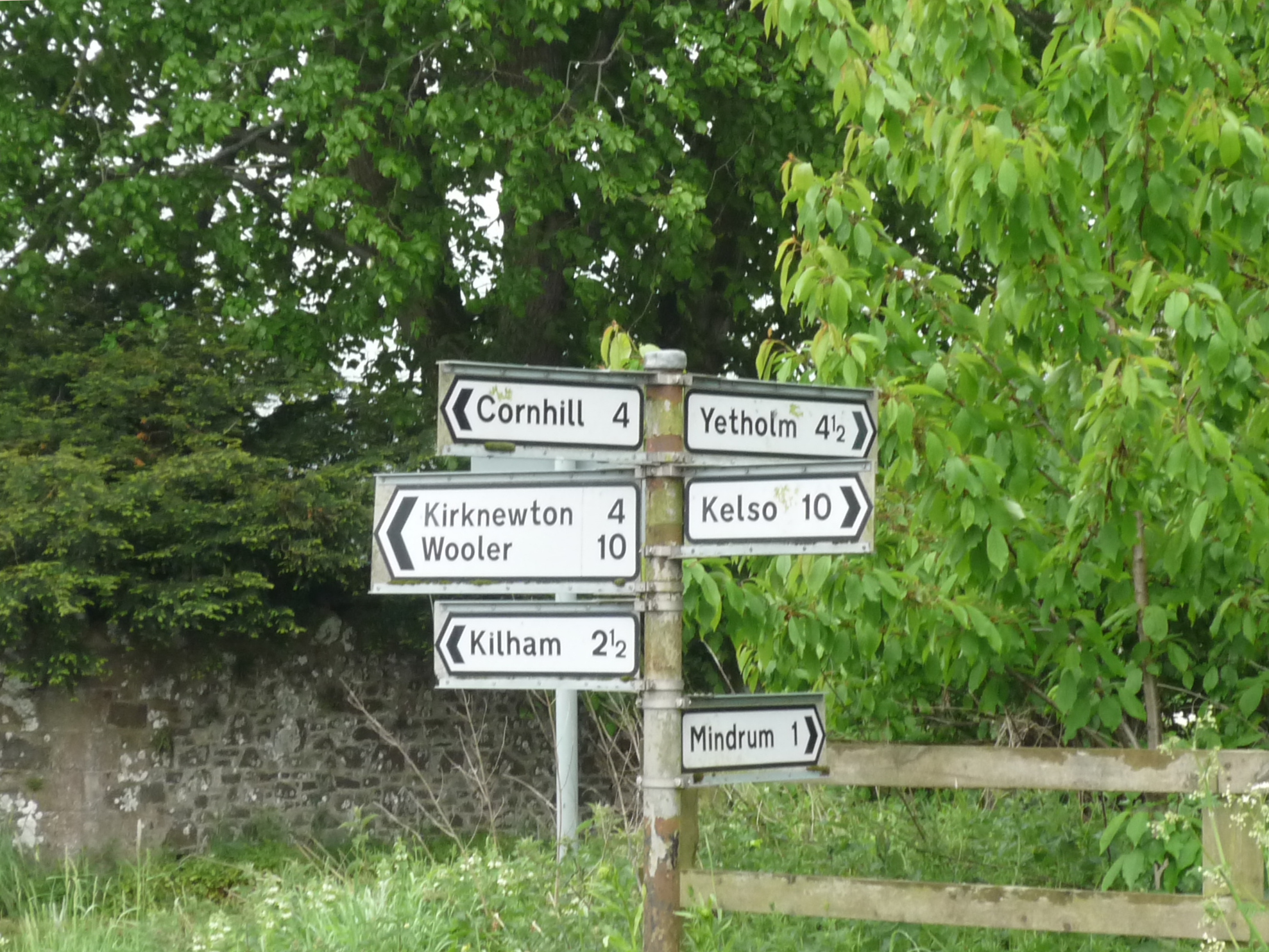
Finger sign at approach to Town and Kirk Yetholm villages (May 2018).

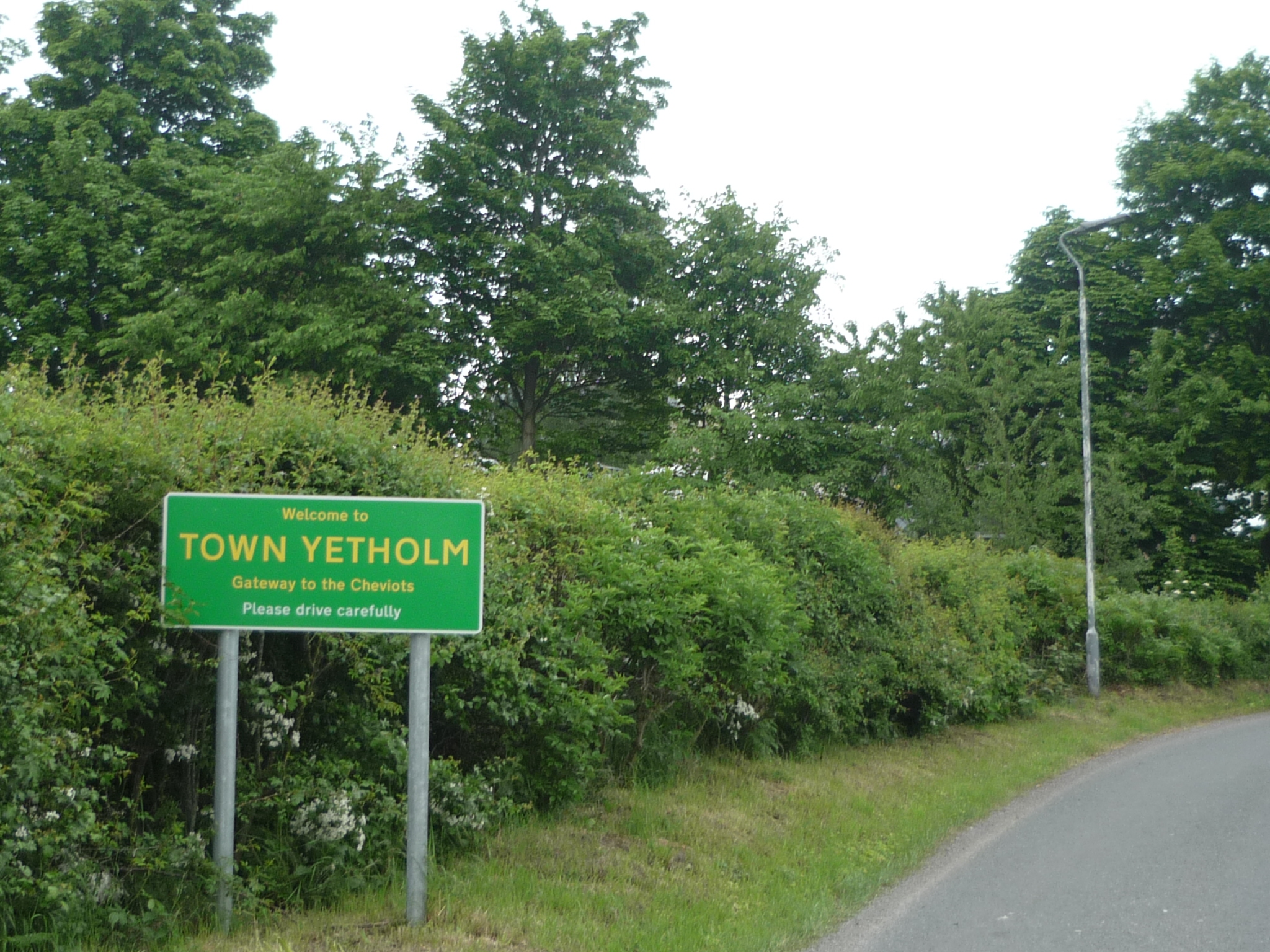
Town Yetholm village sign (May 2018).

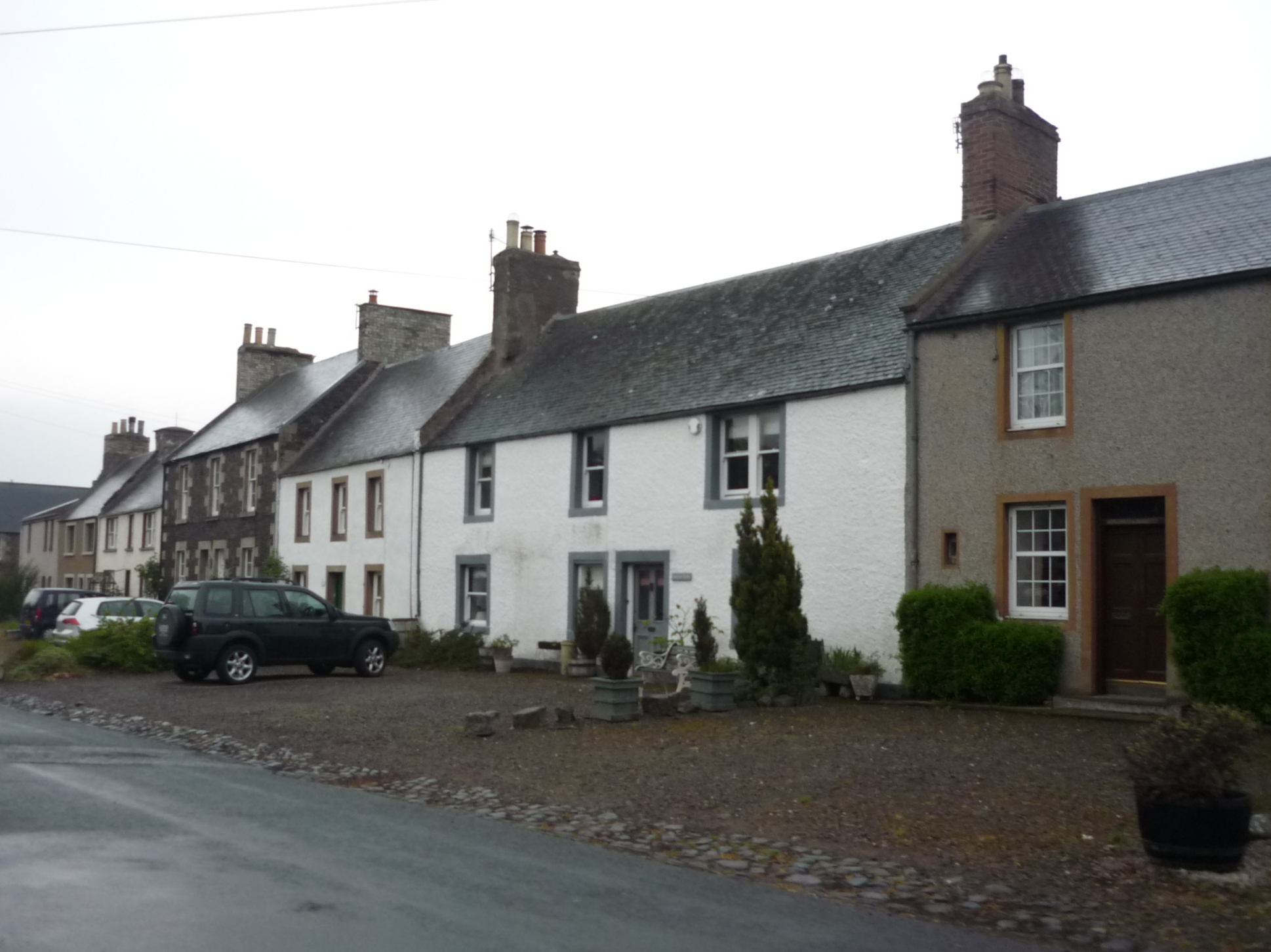
Village housing on the main street (May 2018).

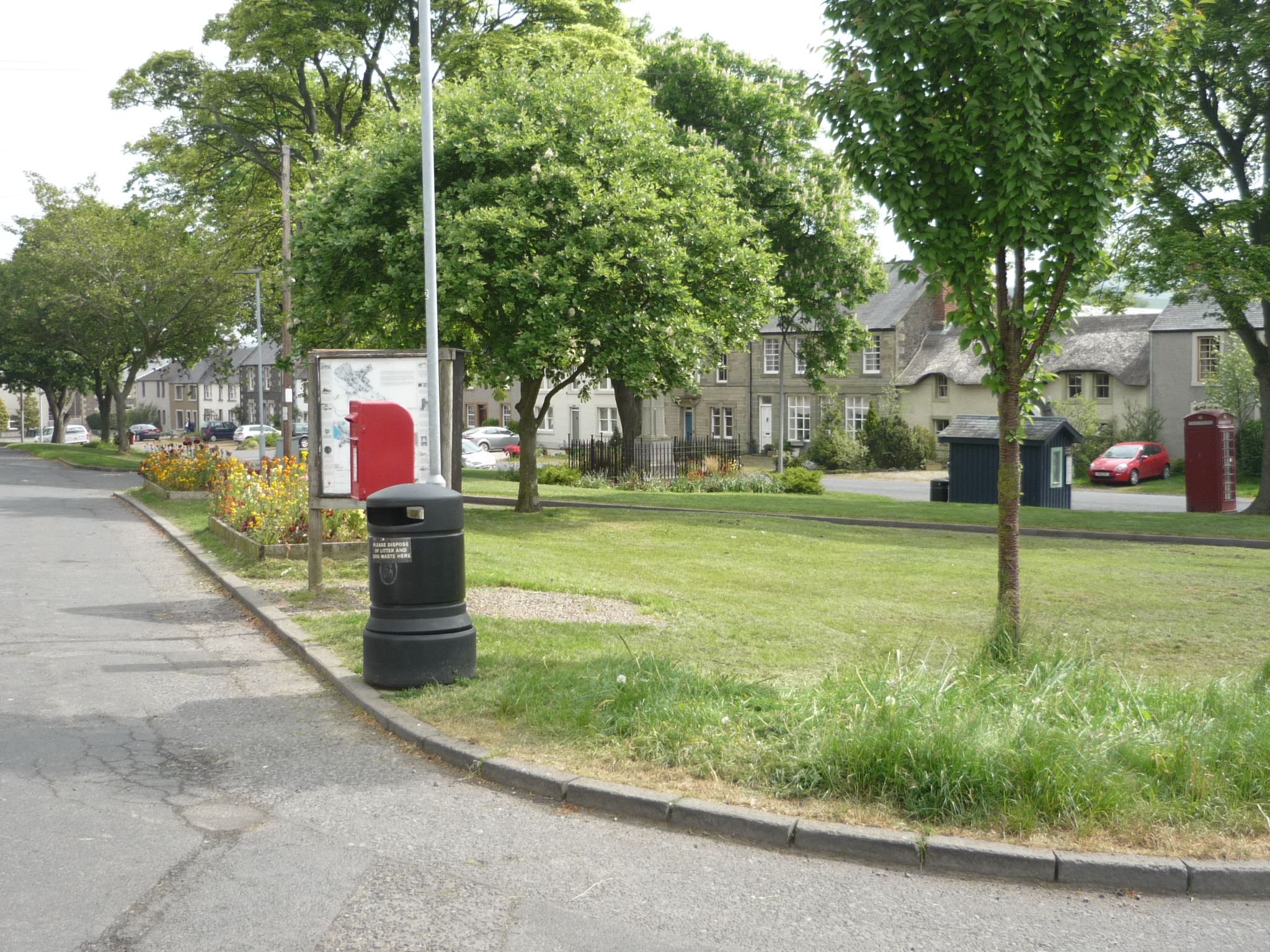
Village green (May 2018).

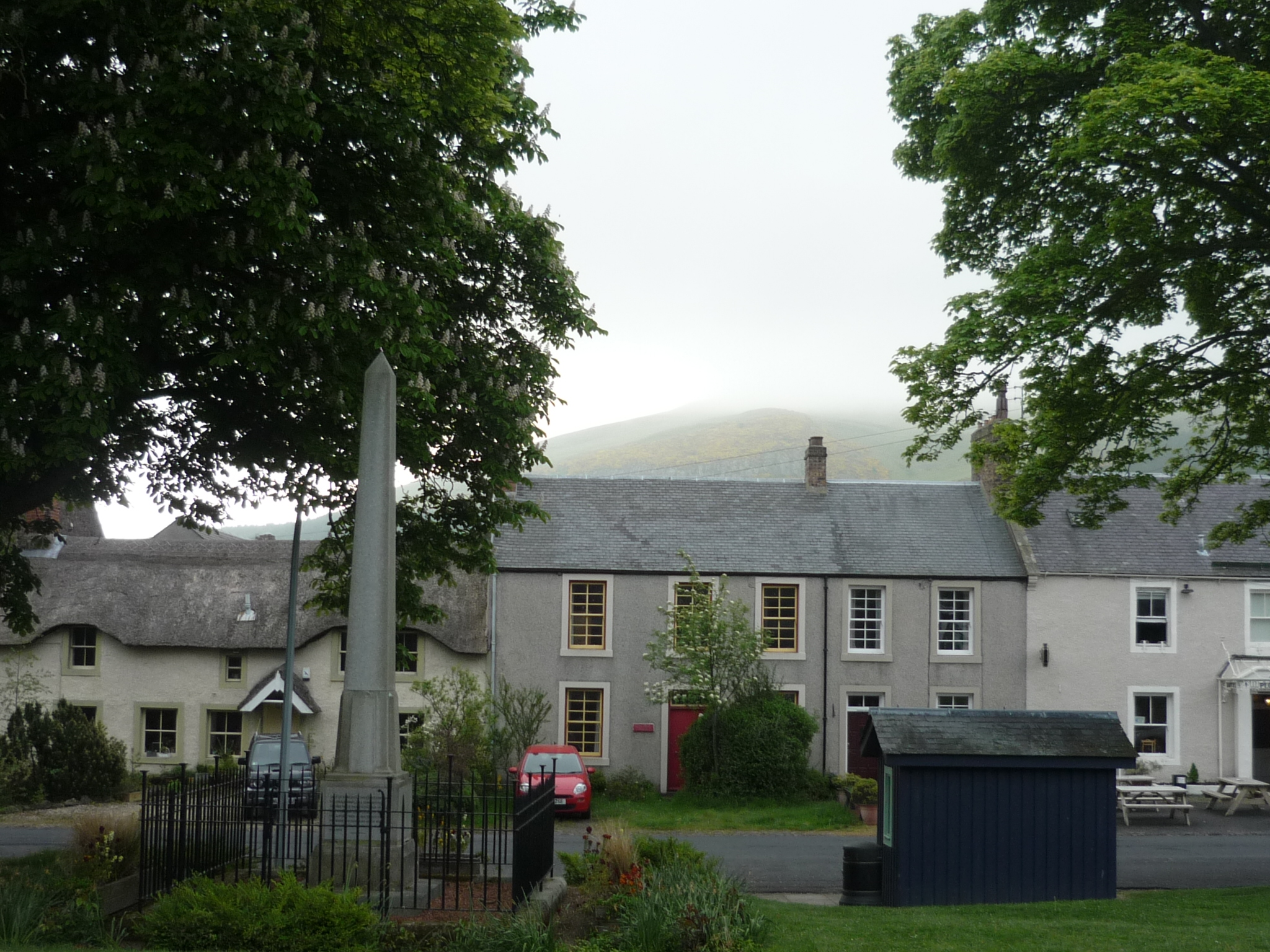
Wauchope obelisk, village green (May 2018).

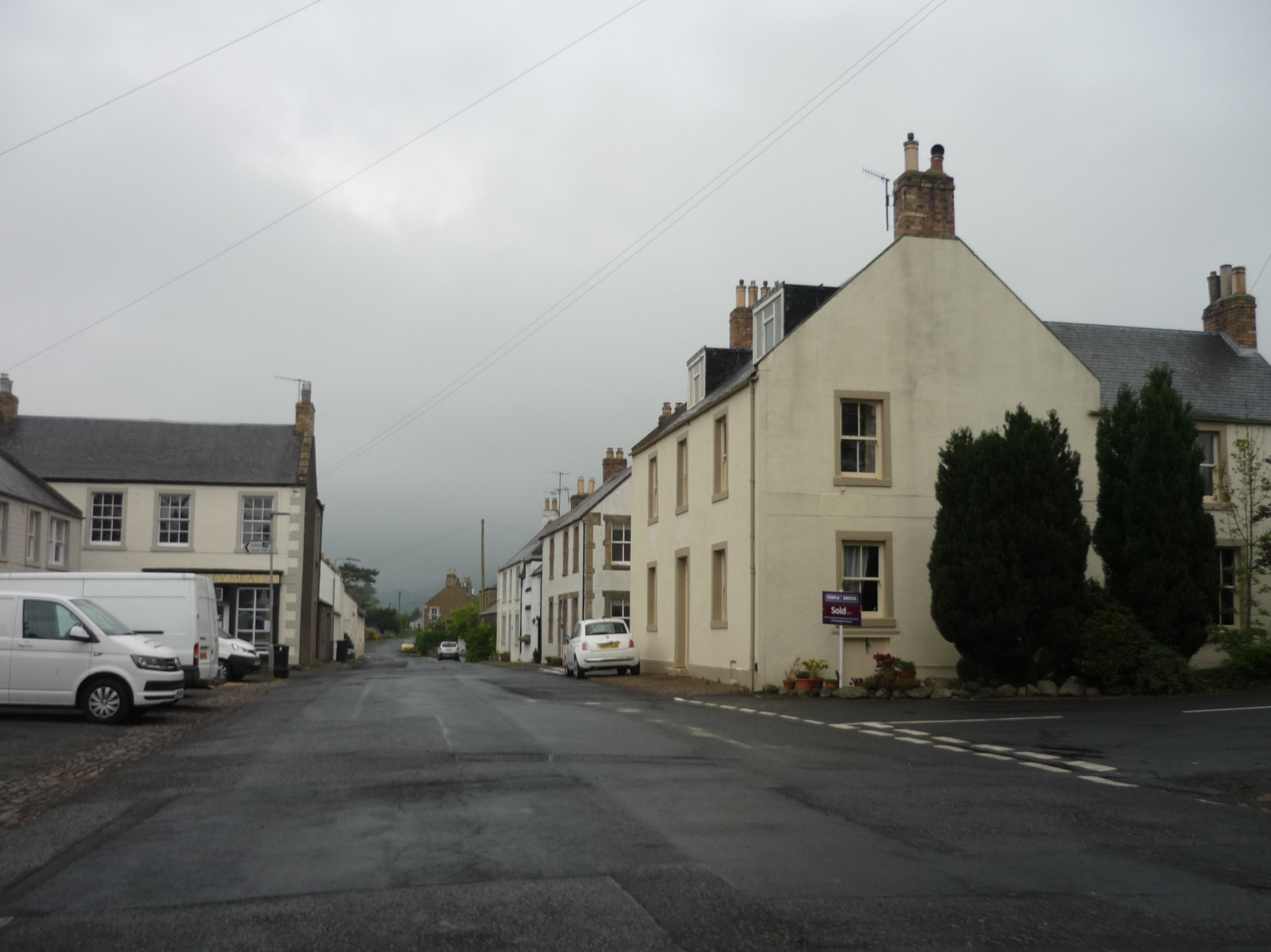
Along the B6352 road from the village centre (May 2018).
