= Kirk Yetholm =

Village in Scotland

Coordinates: 55.5471°N 2.2754°W

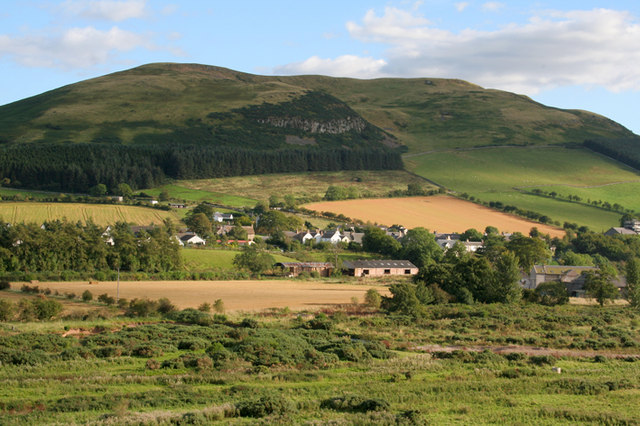
- Kirk Yetholm from the Mindrum Road (September 2007)

- Location within the Scottish Borders
- Civil parish: Yetholm
- Council area: Scottish Borders
- Lieutenancy area: Roxburgh, Ettrick and Lauderdale
- Country: Scotland
- Sovereign state: United Kingdom
- Post town: KELSO
- Postcode district: TD5
- Dialling code: 01573
- Police: Scotland
- Fire: Scottish
- Ambulance: Scottish
- UK Parliament: Berwickshire, Roxburgh and Selkirk
- Scottish Parliament: Ettrick, Roxburgh and Berwickshire

Kirk Yetholm ('kirk yet-ham') is a village in the Scottish Borders region of Scotland, 8 miles (13 kilometres) southeast of Kelso and less than 1 mile (2 kilometres) west of the border. The first mention is of its church in the 13th century. Its sister town is Town Yetholm which lies 1/2 mile (800 metres) across the Bowmont Water. The population of the two villages was recorded as 591 in the 2001 census.

== Etymology ==
Yetholm means either:

- the goats' island from Old English gat 'goat' and Old Norse holmr (island, holme)
- village with a gate – from Old English geat-ham ‘gate village’

== Romani People ==
Kirk Yetholm was the headquarters of the Romanichal travellers in Scotland, having settled in the village about 1750. The last King of the Gypsies, Charles Faa Blyth Rutherford, aged 70, was crowned on 31 May 1898. A second male, David Blyth, claimed he was the rightful heir, but did not attend the huge ceremony and festivities which was held between the two Yetholm villages. The king died just four years later on 21 April 1902. Today the gypsies have been integrated and are no longer a separate ethnic minority. A memorial stone can be found on the village green.

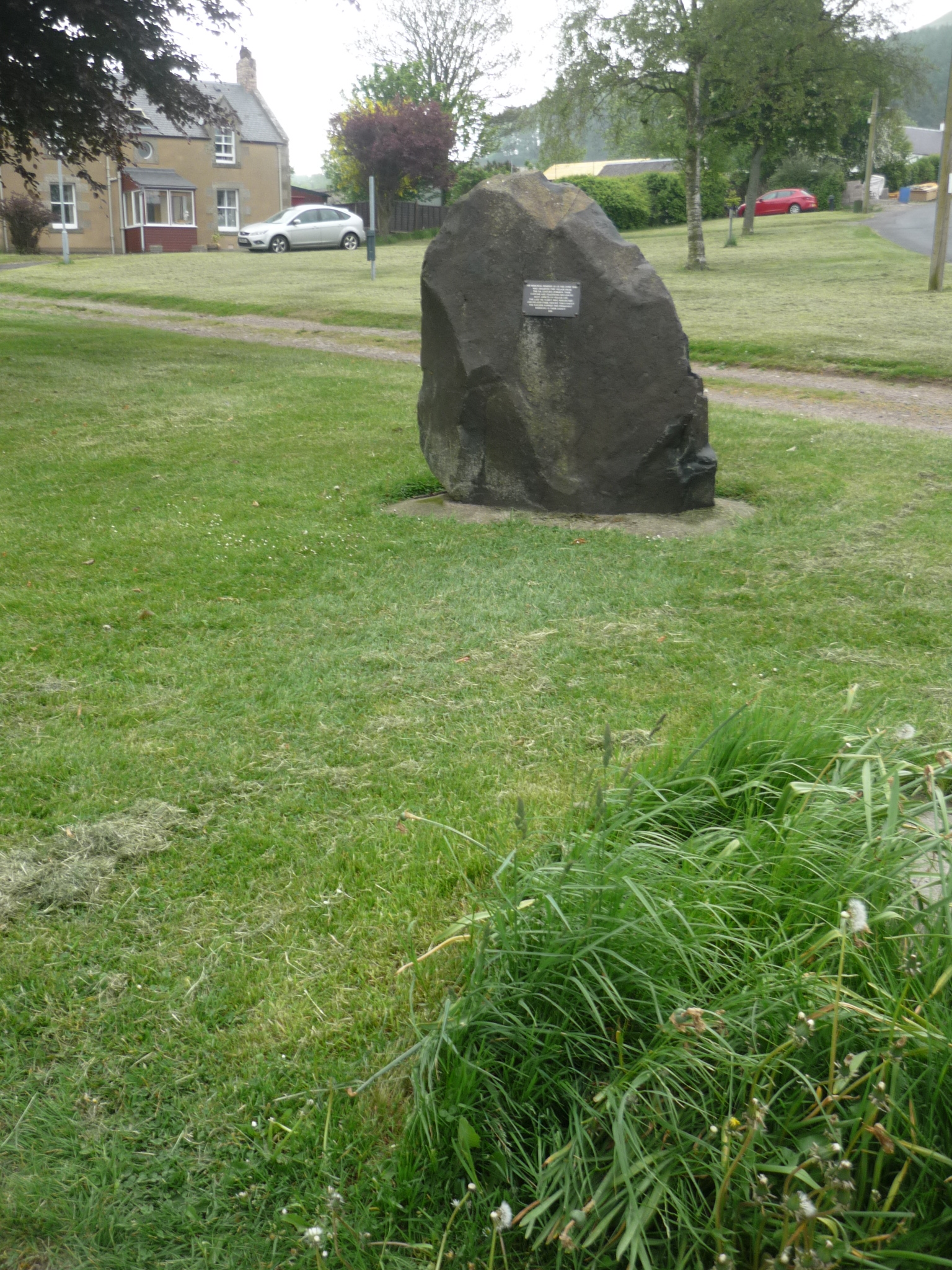
Gypsy stone and plaque (May 2018).

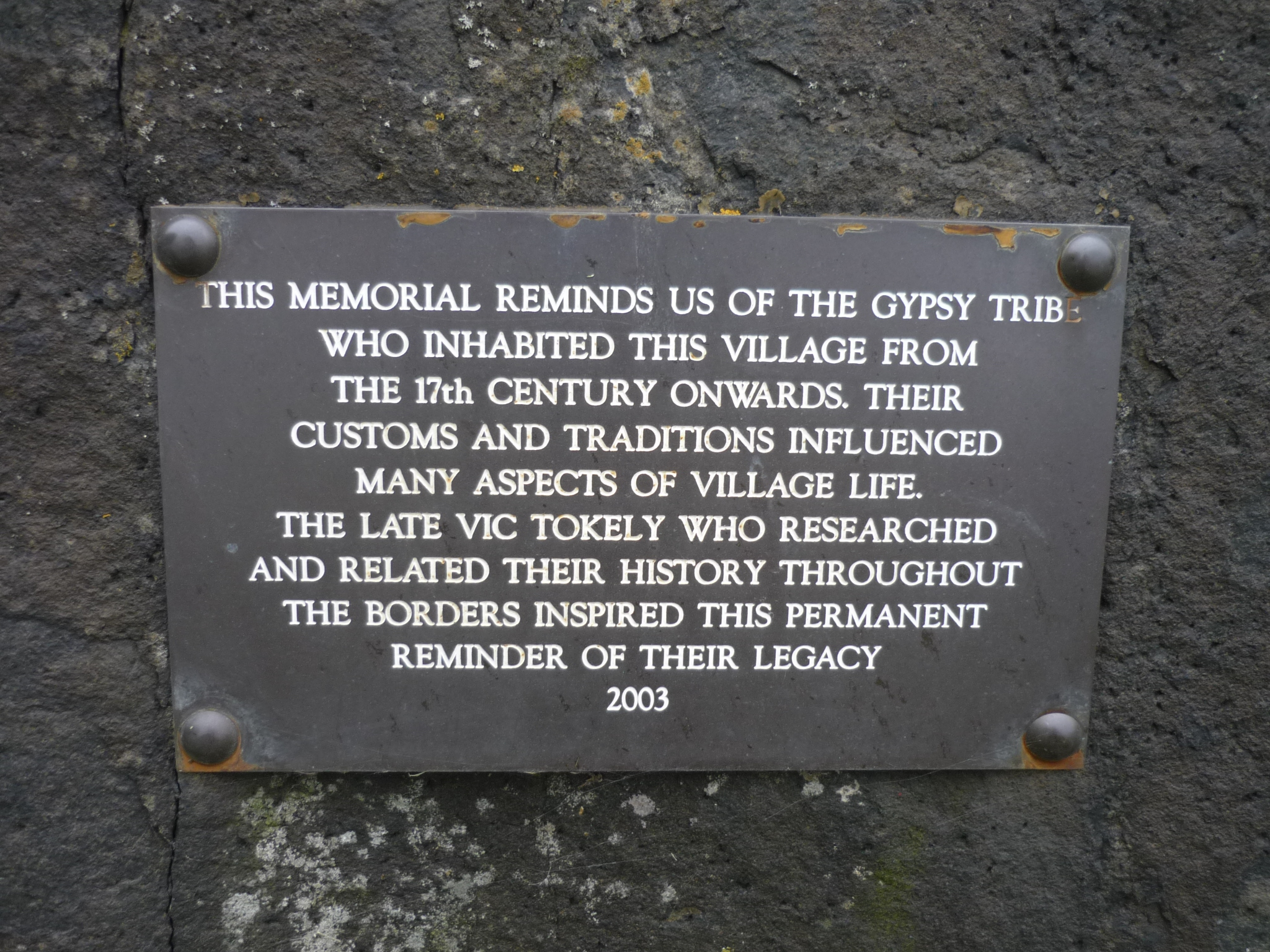
Gypsy plaque (May 2018).

== Saint Cuthbert's Way and Pennine Way ==
The village is notable for being the northern terminus of the Pennine Way, and to a lesser extent the southern terminus of the Scottish National Trail. The Border Hotel public house is the official end of the Pennine Way.

Saint Cuthbert's Way also passes through the village, going between Melrose, Scotland and Lindisfarne (Holy Island), Northumberland.

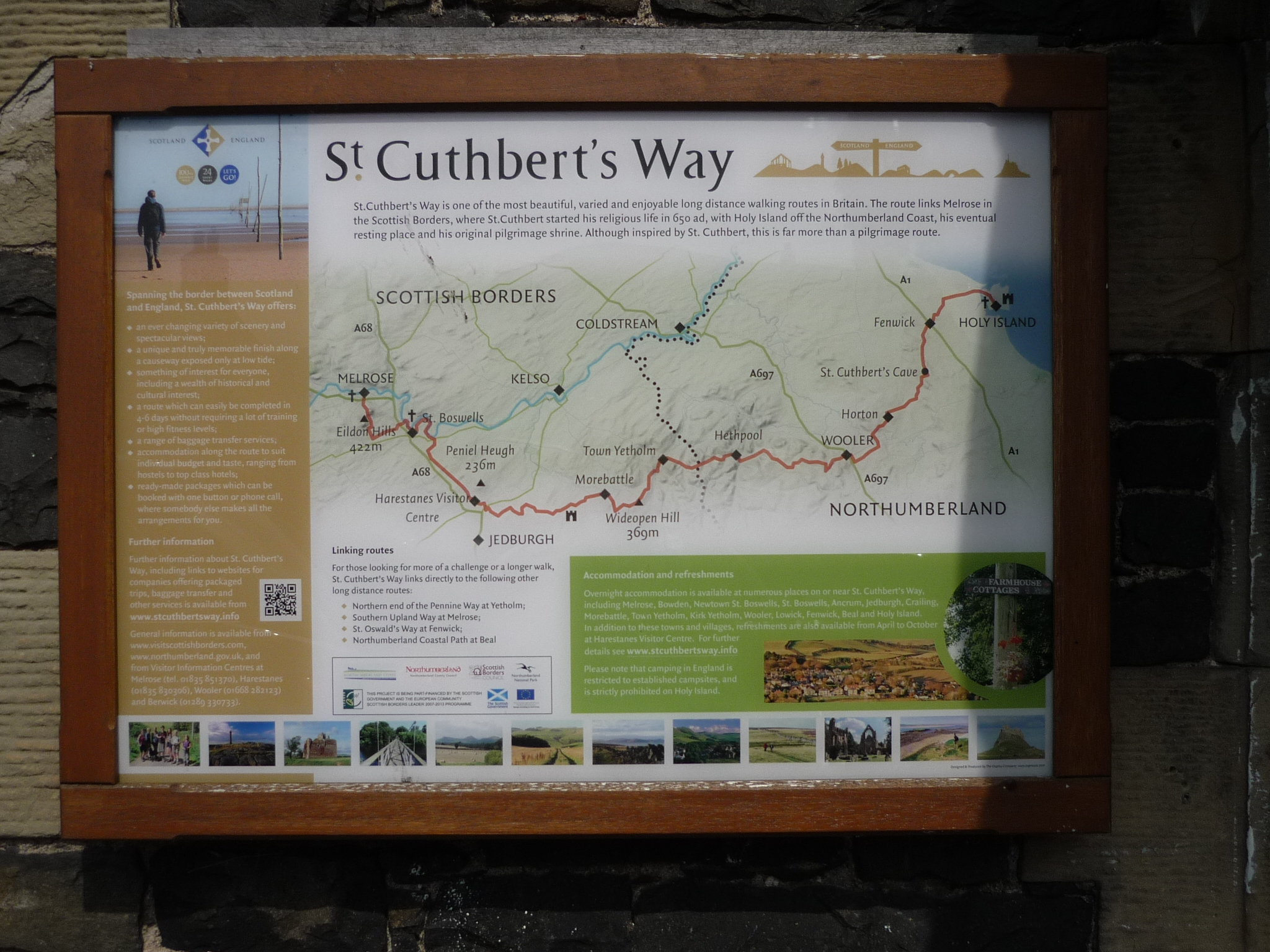
Saint Cuthbert's Way map (May 2018).

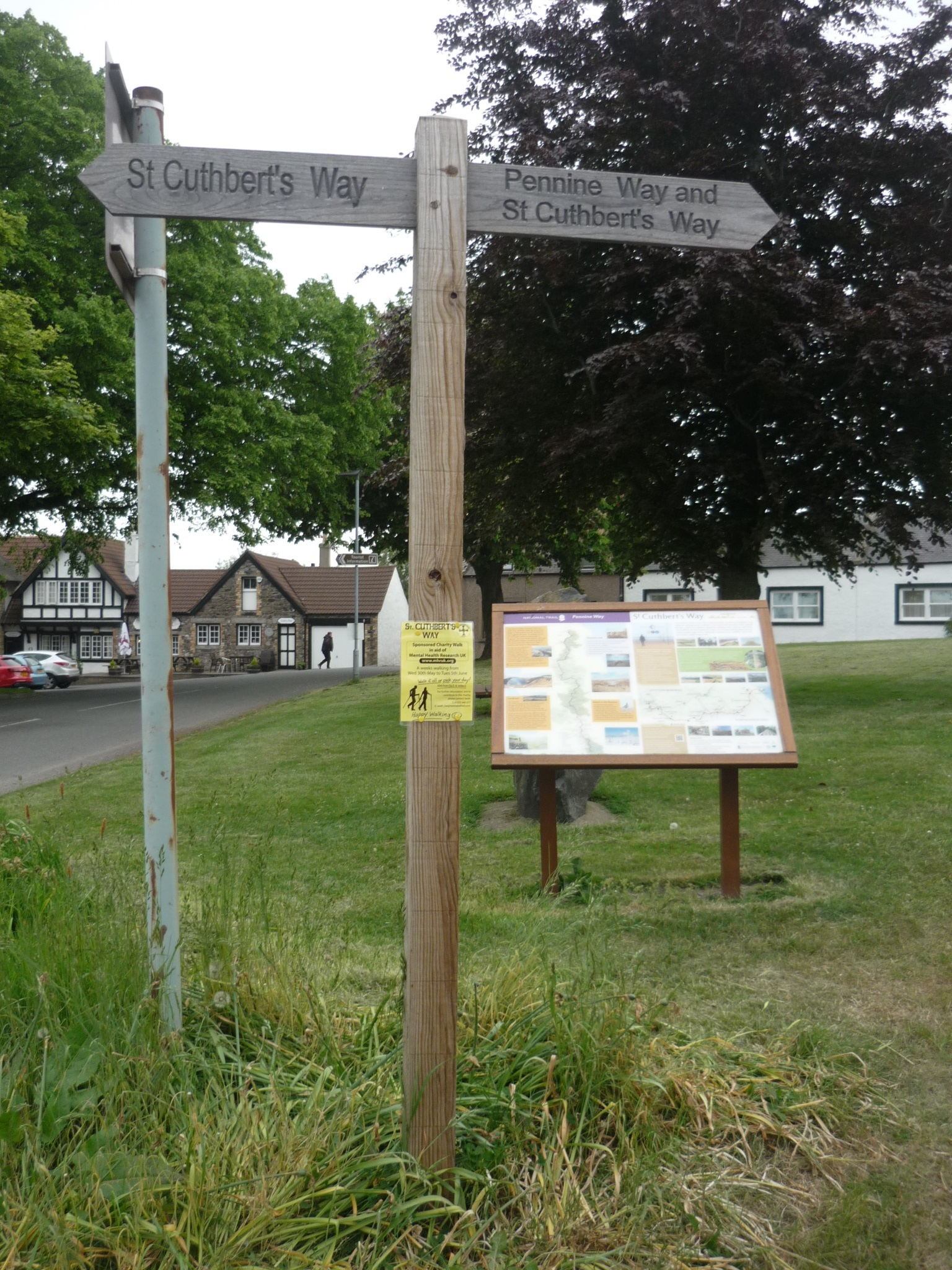
Signpost (May 2018).

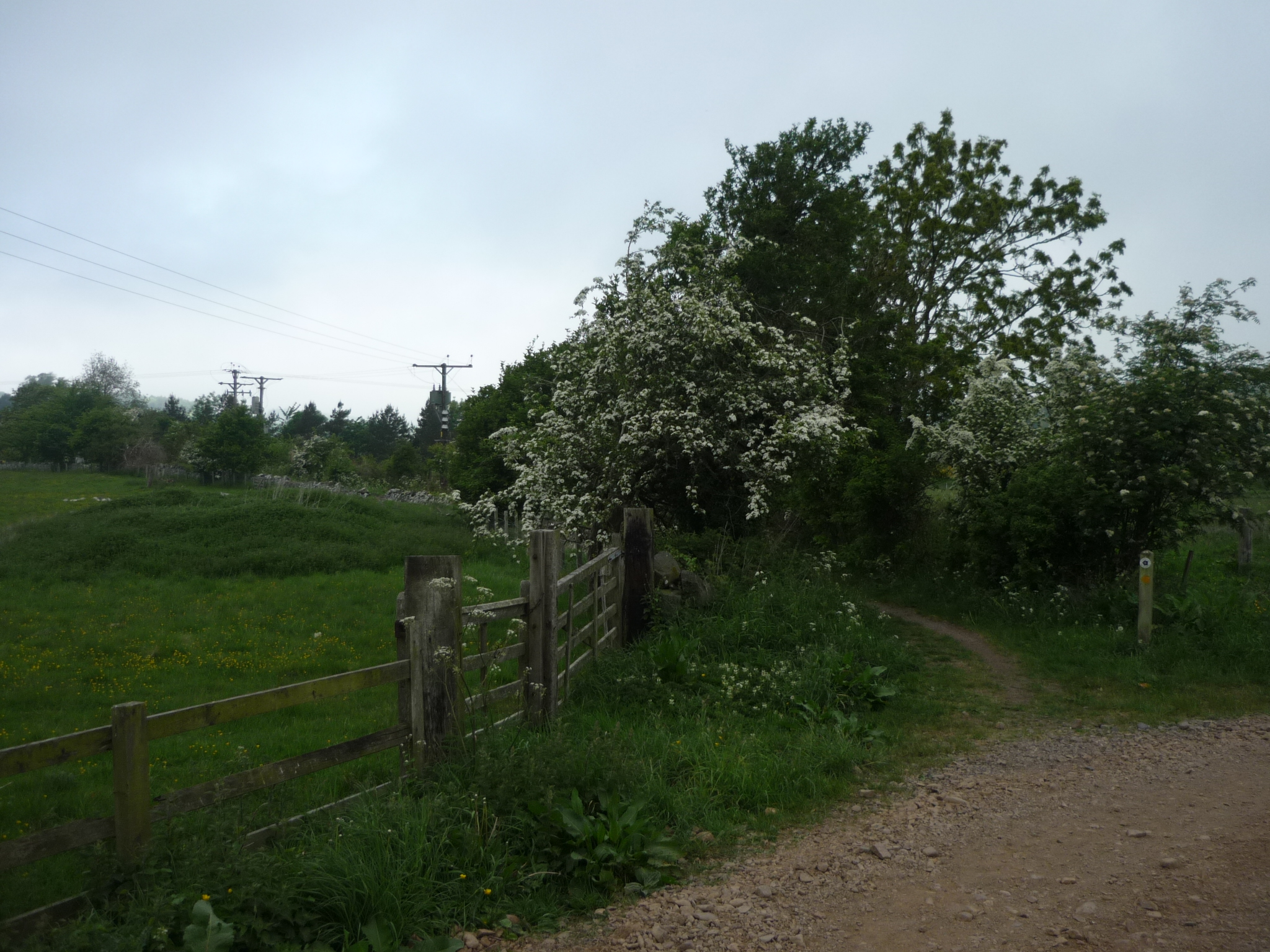
Way near youth hostel (May 2018).

== Youth hostel ==
In 1942 the village school building was converted into a Scottish Youth Hostels Association hostel. It now continues in use as an affiliate hostel named the Kirk Yetholm Friends of Nature House. It provides accommodation for tourists, particularly walkers and cyclists, being located on Saint Cuthbert's Way, the Pennine Way, the Scottish National Trail, the Sustrans National Cycle Route 1 and Scottish Borders Loop.

== Activities ==
The first Saturday in October is traditionally the Yetholm Border Shepherds' Show, held on the land between Town Yetholm and Kirk Yetholm, with the 156th show held in 2019. It stemmed from the old practice of farmers gathering to sort through stray sheep from neighbours' flocks.

A song referring to Kirk Yetholm called "Yetholm Day" was written and composed by Gary Cleghorn.

Scottish Border poet and Australian bush balladeer Will H. Ogilvie (1869–1963) wrote 'The gipsies' (c. 1910; and later put to music by British composer Graham Peel), having been raised 8 miles (13 km) away. Ogilvie also wrote a song for the 'Coronation of the Gipsy King at Yetholm' by July 1898 whilst in Australia.

== Gallery ==
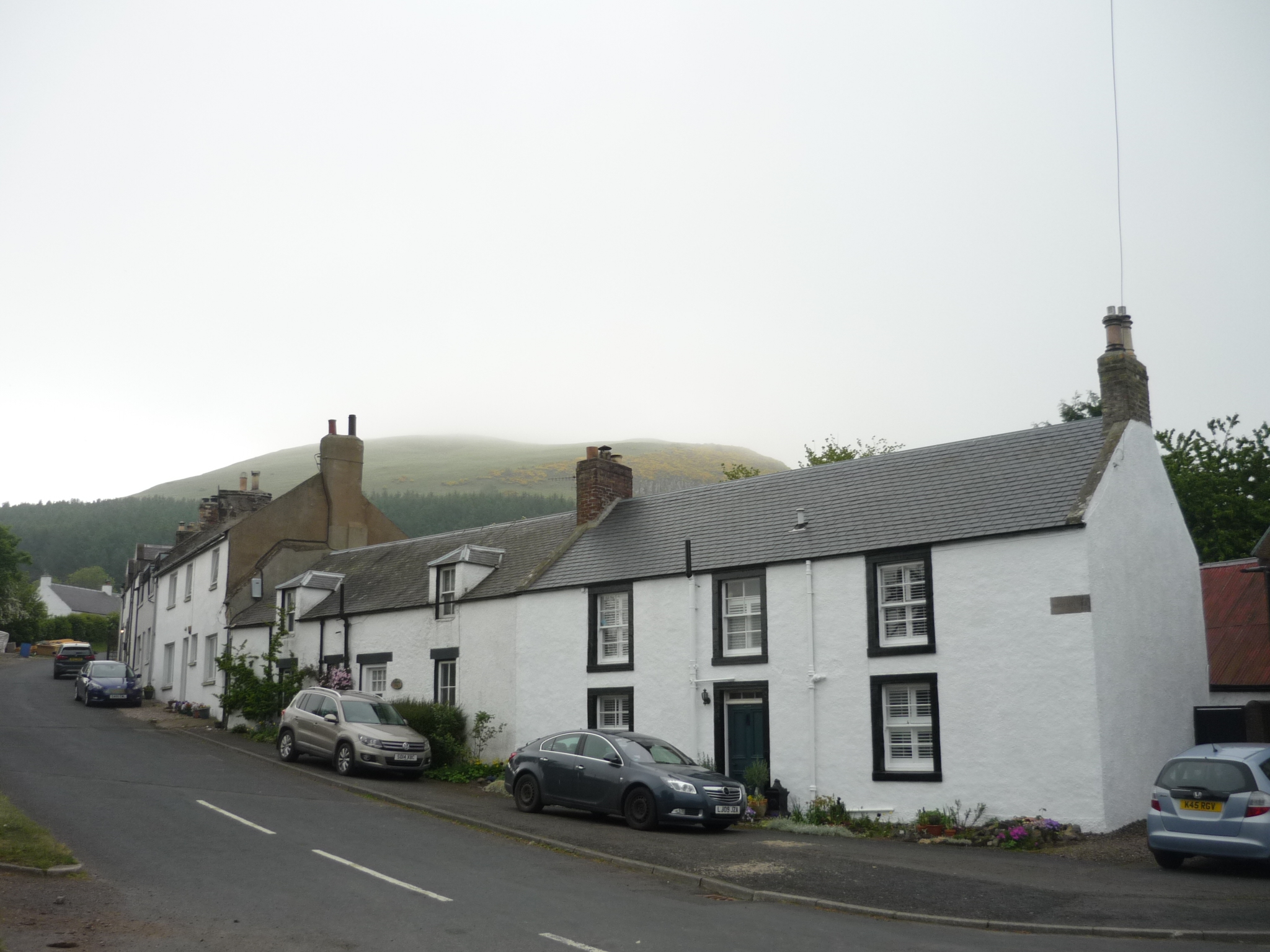
Housing near the green (May 2018).

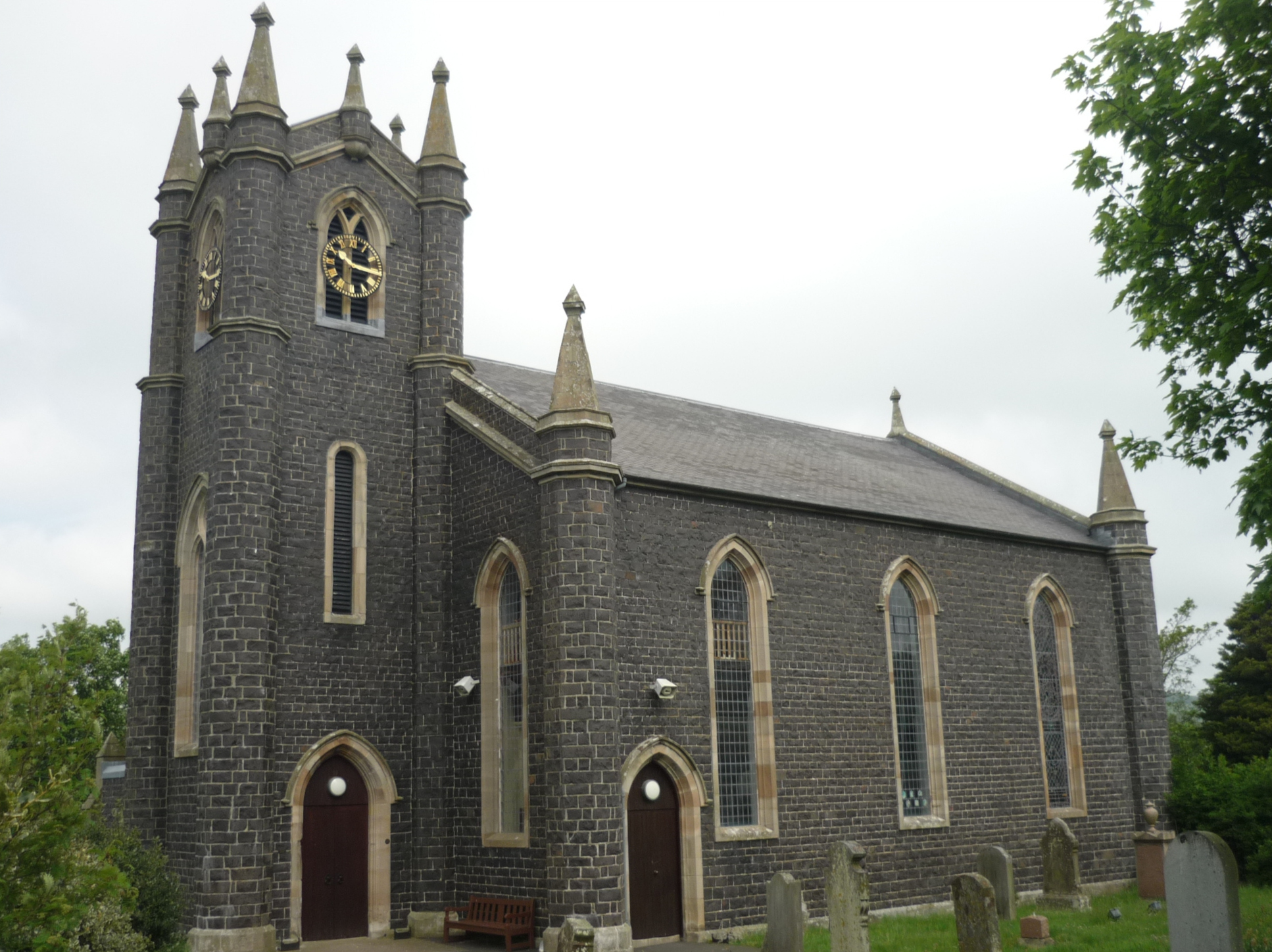
Kirk at Kirk Yetholm village (May 2018).

== See also ==
- Town Yetholm
- List of places in the Scottish Borders
- List of places in Scotland
