= Rhos Rydd Shield =

Bronze Age shield facing found in Wales

- Tarian Rhos Rydd
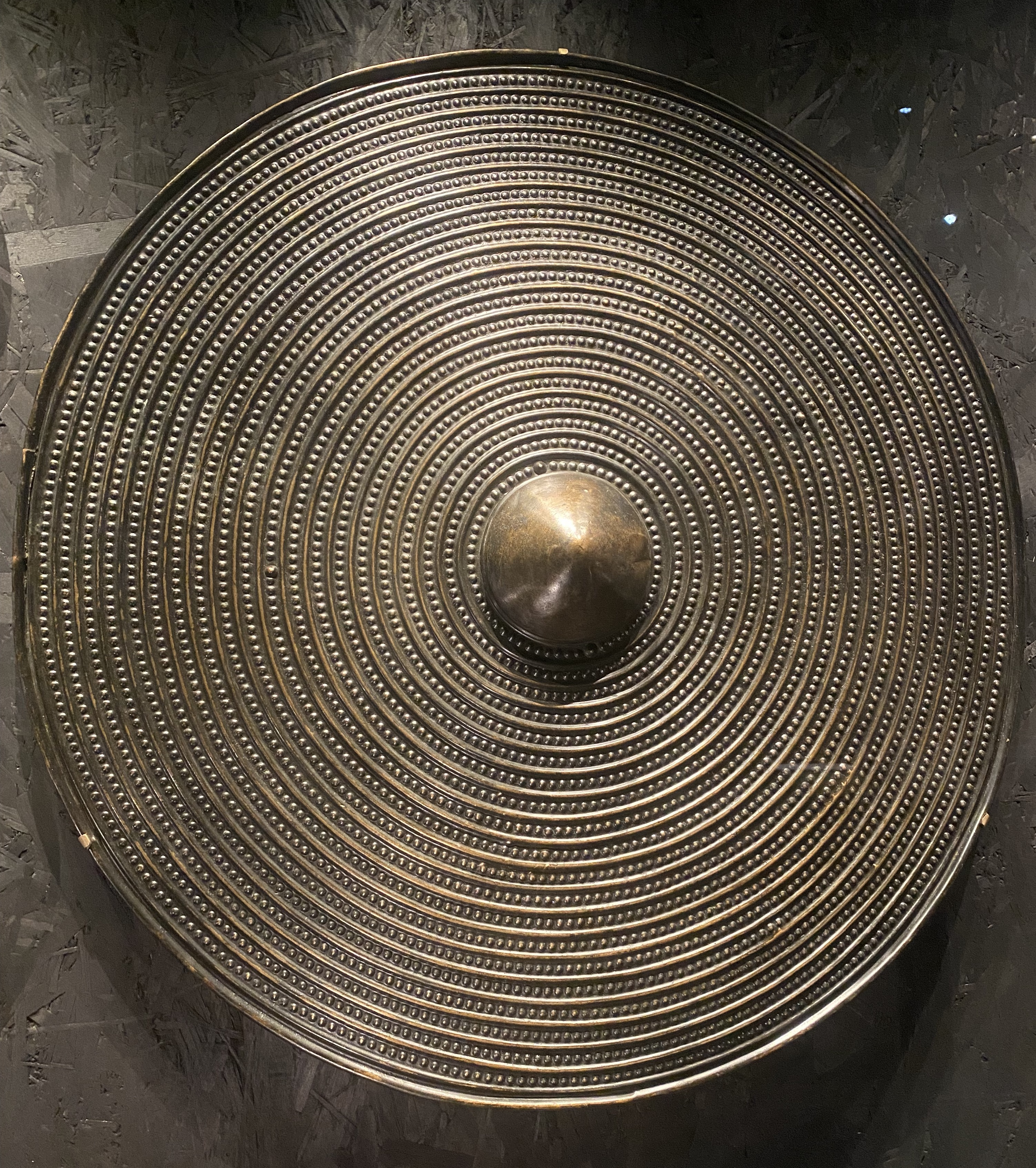
- On display at the British Museum
- Material: Welsh copper alloy
- Created: c. 1300–1000 BC
- Present location: British Museum

The Rhos-Rydd Shield (Welsh: Tarian Rhos Rydd), or Rhyd y Gors (or less commonly Glan-rhos shield) is a large copper-alloy Yetholm-type shield from the Bronze Age, found in Rhos-Rydd or Rhyd y Gors, near Blaenplwyf, Wales. It is currently held in the British Museum in London. It is completely flat, 667 mm across, and 0.7 mm thick, weighing 1929 grams. It dates from the 12th to the 10th century BC.

== History ==
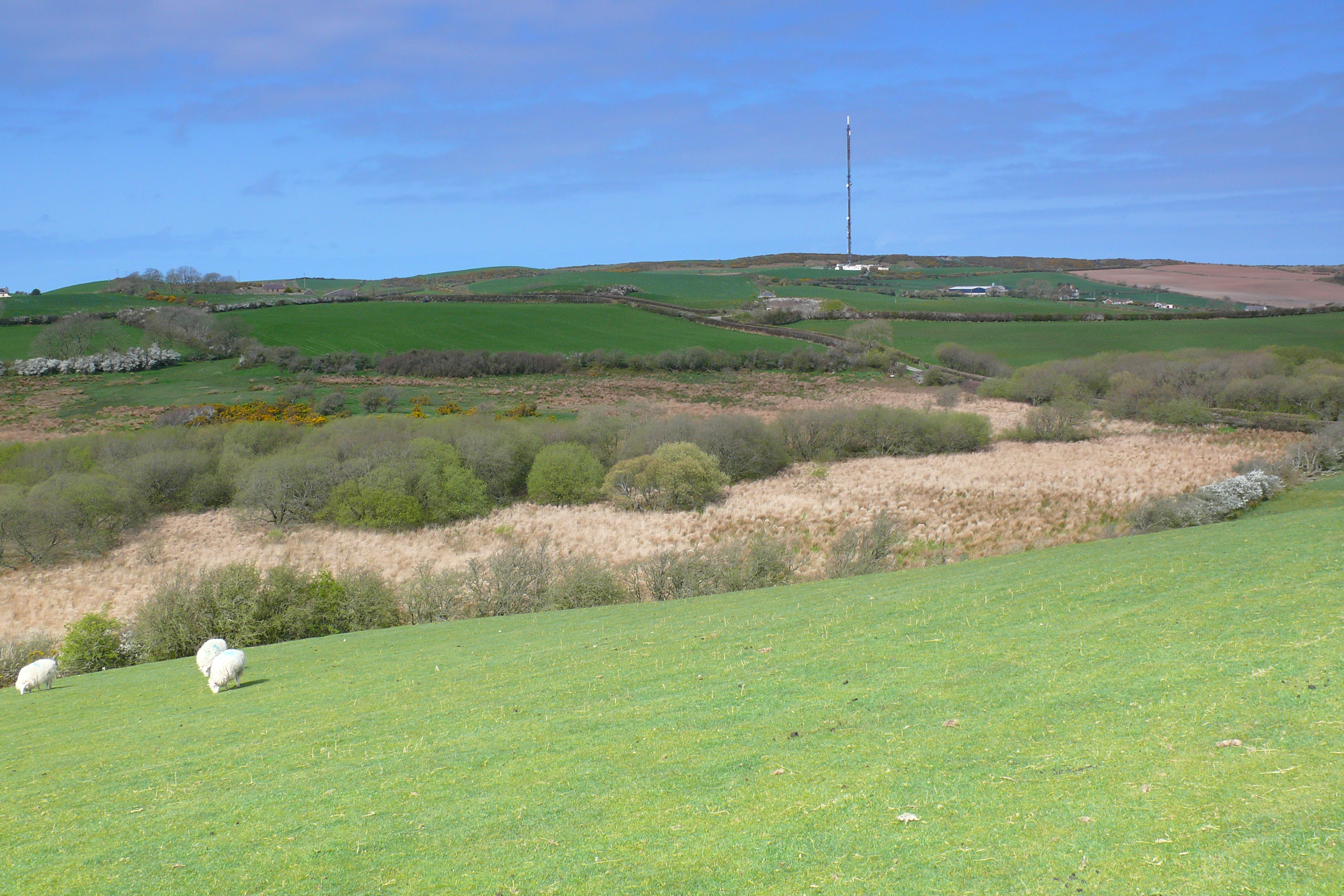
Rhos rydd

This perfectly preserved Bronze Age facing from an ancient British shield was found in the marsh at Rhyd-y-gors, Ceredigion, before 1834 according to some sources.

According to another source, the shield was found in 1804 in Rhos Rydd bog.

The shield was donated to the British Museum by Sir Augustus Wollaston Franks in 1873. This shield is an example of early Bronze Age copper alloy use.

There have been calls for the artefact to return to Wales.

== See also ==
- Archaeology of Wales
