= Yetholm-type shield =

Type of Bronze Age shield

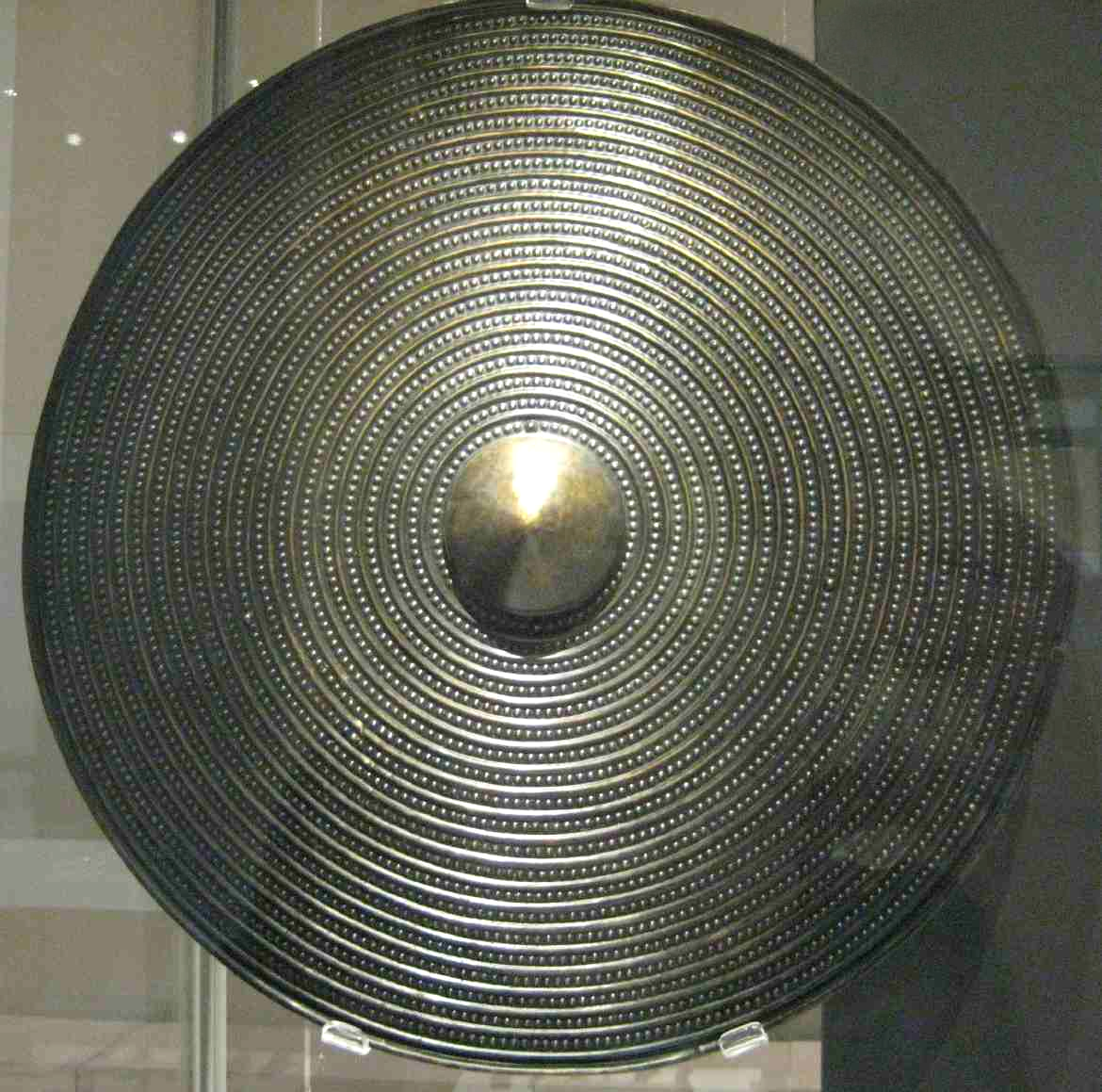
the Rhyd-y-gors Shield, a Yetholm-type shield, 12th-10th century BC, British Museum

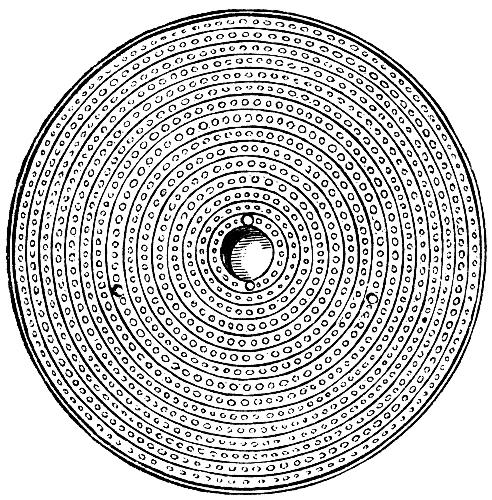

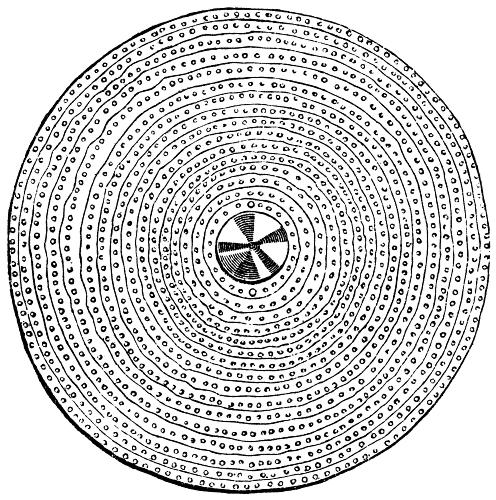

The Yetholm-type shield is a distinctive type of shield dating from 1300-800 BC (Bronze Age). The known shields come from Britain and Ireland, excepting one from Denmark. Their modern name comes from Yetholm in southern Scotland where a peat bog yielded three examples. Twenty-two examples are known, although some of these are fragmentary, and a further seven or eight are known from written sources but are lost today. The shields vary significantly in size, but are otherwise similar.

Rock carvings from this period made in Southern Scandinavia include depictions of shields decorated with concentric rings or rings of dots. The artist could not hope to show the fine detail of a Yetholm-type shield, but the similarity is striking.

The impressive shields would have indicated high social status.

== Construction ==
The shields are made of a copper alloy sheet about 0.6 mm thick. The alloy is a high-tin bronze: copper with 11-14% tin. They are round with a central domed boss created by hammering out from the back. The shield face is covered in raised ridges in concentric rings, each a couple of millimetres high. Between the ridges are rings of small hemispherical bosses about 4 mm across. Decoration was formed by hammering from the reverse (Repoussé).

The outer edge of the shield has been folded back and hammered down to form a strong rim. A handle is riveted across the open bowl of the boss, made from a thicker piece of sheet bronze folded over; also attached are a pair of metal tabs for a carrying strap. Rivet heads are on the front for fitting attachments, but are similar to the decorative raised bosses and difficult to identify.

Probably a flanged punch created the bosses to a uniform size and depth, although no contemporary tool has been found to accomplish this. The embossing would probably require the work piece to be supported, conceivably by a bed of pitch or lead. Some eye-judgement was required, which is revealed in the detail of the spacing of the bosses. As the craftsman came to complete a ring, the spacing would be changed slightly so as to ensure an even design and make the starting place inconspicuous. The shields show a high degree of accomplishment and, given the degree of similarity, it is likely that all were made in the same workshop by a few craftsmen.

== Variations ==
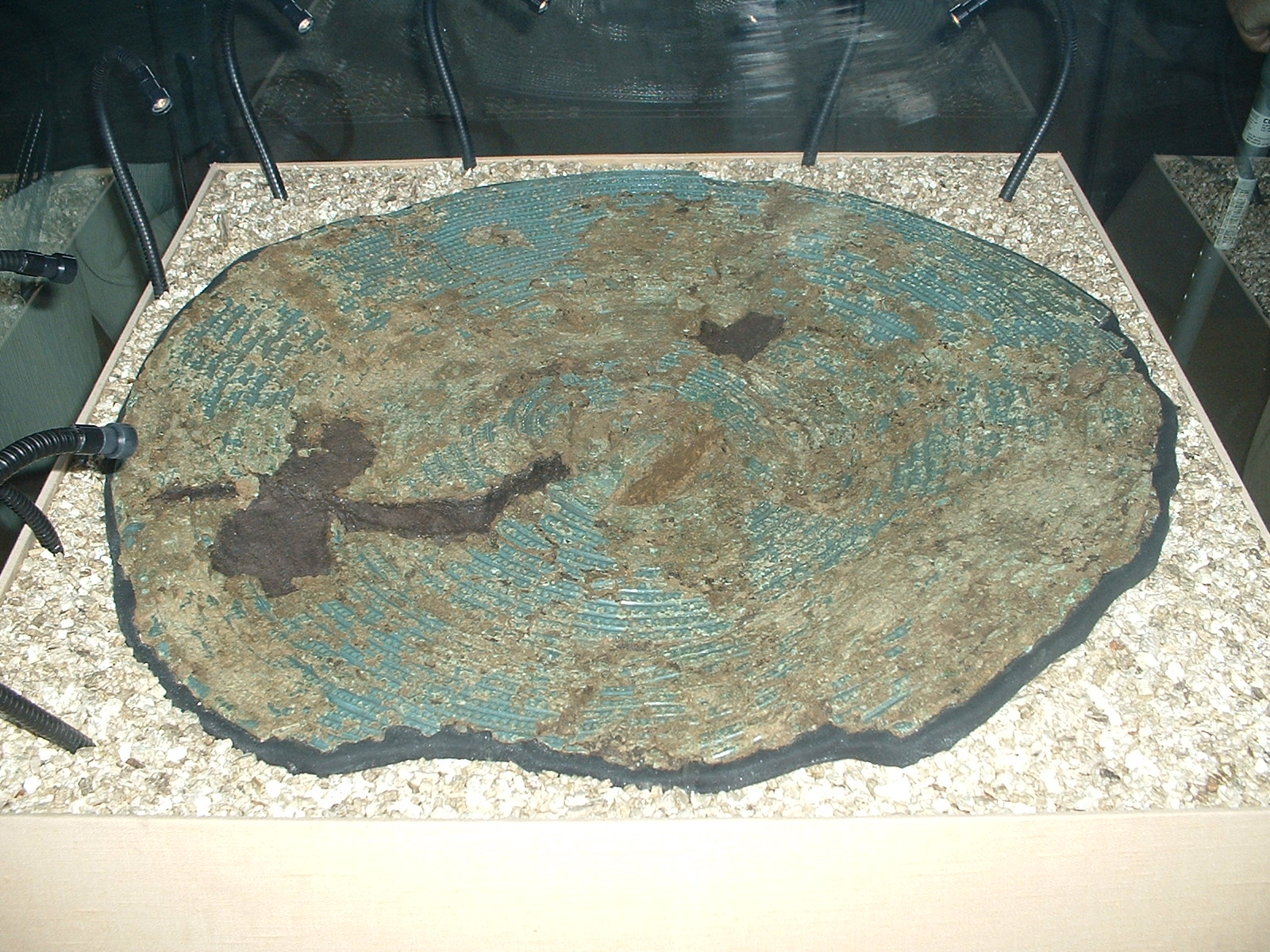
Yetholm-type shield from South Cadbury. Displayed at Museum of Somerset, Taunton.

The shields vary in size and in the number of embossed rings, but the size of the embossed features is consistent. The largest shield (found at Ayrshire) has twenty nine circular ridges and twenty nine rings of bosses; the smallest (originally thought to have been from County Antrim but actually from The River Thames) has eleven ridges and rings.

The overall design, and especially the tabs, indicate that the shield did not have a wooden backing or other reinforcement, though one shield from Lough Gur is believed to have been backed with leather (which was initially written off as dried peat). The embossed design and folded rim impart some stiffness, but some have suggested that the shields were too flimsy for combat. In a 1952 archaeology experiment by John Coles, a reconstruction was made from copper hardened to match a Yetholm-type shield, and it was hit with a replica bronze sword. The shield was cut in two by a single stroke. However, experiments by Barry Molloy and Kate Anderson have pointed out that bronze, the original material used, is substantially harder than even the hardened copper used by Coles, and that he appears to have used a much thinner sheet of copper than in the original designs. Additional design features such as small handles with only about 110 mm for the fingers to grip, have also been cited as evidence that the shields were not used for combat.

Some shields have damage likely to have occurred as a part of a sacrificial ceremony. The South Cadbury specimen was laid in a ditch and stabbed three times with a wooden stake. Its discovery prompted metallurgical analysis of this and other examples by Peter Northover, strongly suggesting that, rather than the accepted range of 1000 to 800 BC, these shields were manufactured in the 12th century BC. Carbon dating implied that the South Cadbury example was deposited in the mid 10th century BC.

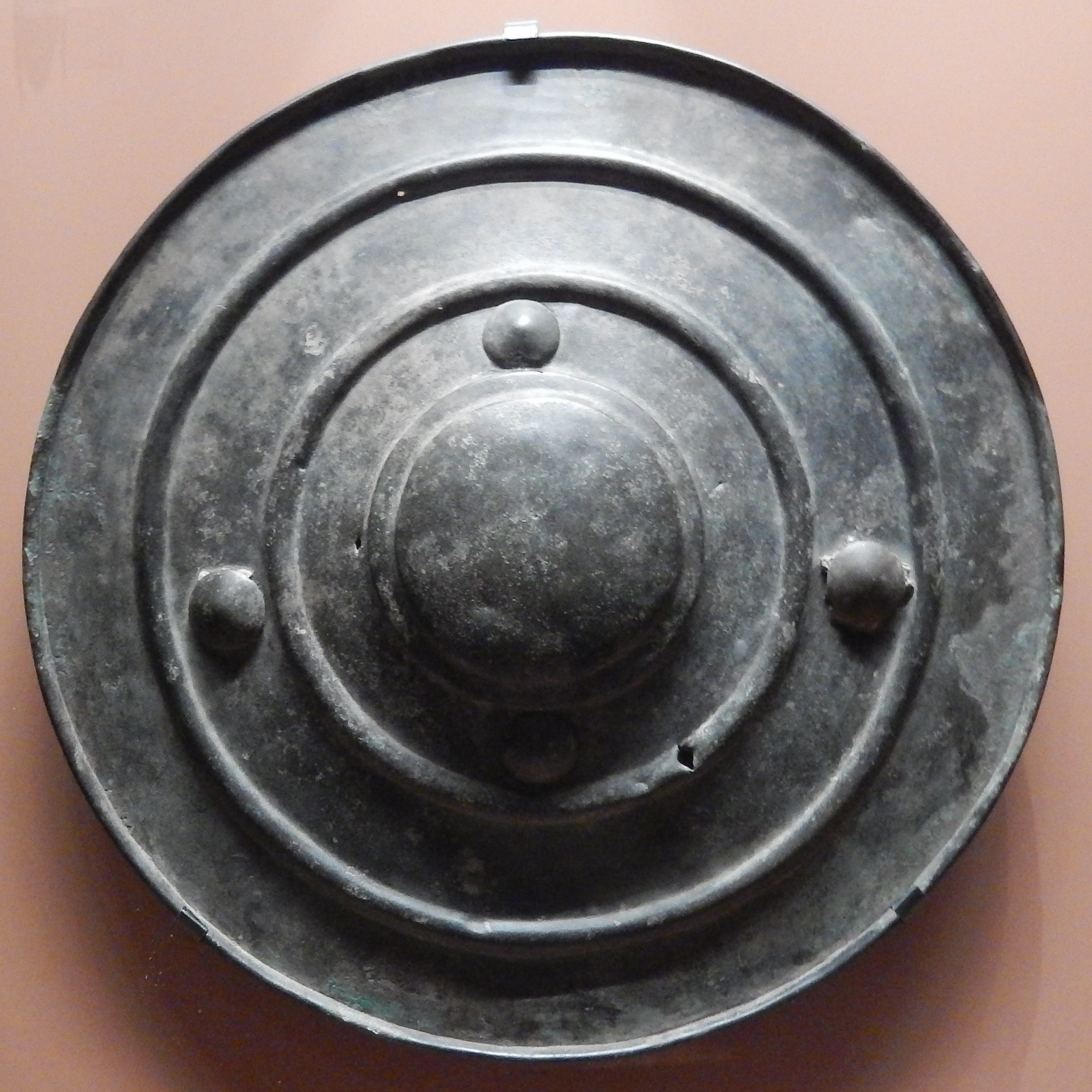
The Wittenham shield, showing perforations that may have been caused by a spearhead

However, one shield from Long Wittenham in Oxfordshire has two lozenge-shaped perforations, interpreted as piercings caused by a spearhead, and other piercings hammered flat to close the gap, suggesting that the shield was a veteran of several combat encounters.

With the exception of the specimen found at South Cadbury by archaeologist Josh Williams, all were found in wet contexts. They formed part of a widespread practice of placing valuable objects in wet places. Presumably, this practice was motivated by religious beliefs, the details of which are unknown - although other ancient societies such as the Celts had similar practices.
