= Carmarthen (1542–1918 UK Parliament constituency) =

UK Parliament constituency (1542–1918)

- Former borough constituency for the House of Commons
- Preserved county: Carmarthenshire
- Major settlements: Carmarthen, Llanelli

1832–1918
- Seats: One
- Created from: Carmarthen and Carmarthenshire (part)
- Replaced by: Carmarthen and Llanelli

1542–1832
- Seats: One
- Type of constituency: Borough constituency

Carmarthen was a borough constituency of the House of Commons in the English Parliament and later the UK Parliament. It existed between 1542 until 1832 representing the town of Carmarthen, Wales. In 1832 it was expanded and named Carmarthen Boroughs from 1832 until 1918. A county-wide constituency of Carmarthenshire also existed between 1542 and 1885.

In 1918 Carmarthen Boroughs was abolished and a new county-wide division with the name Carmarthen was established.

== History ==
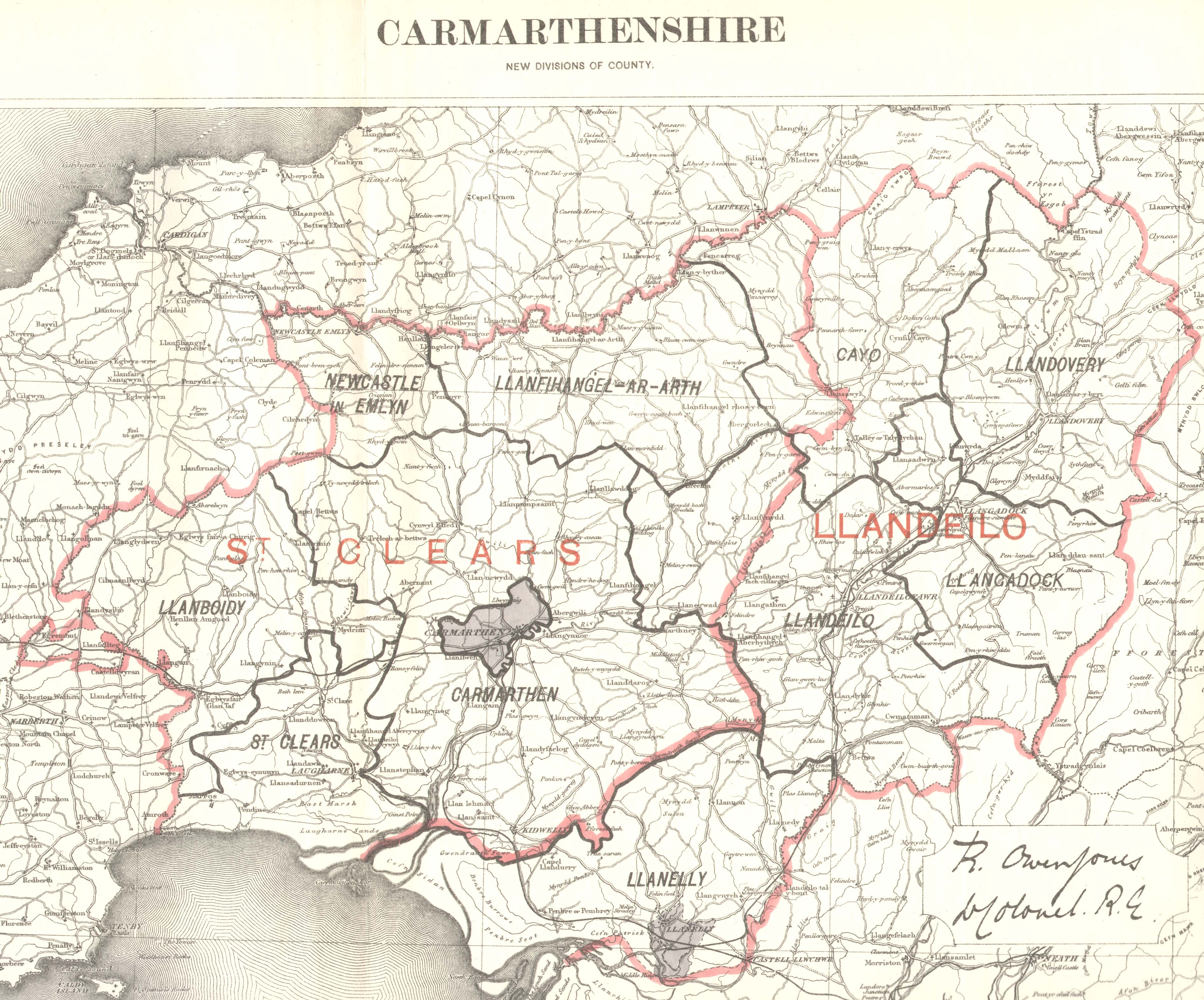
Carmarthenshire boundaries 1885–1918

Until 1832, Carmarthen was a borough constituency consisting of the town of Carmarthen.

Between 1832 and 1918 Carmarthen was a district of boroughs constituency, consisting of Carmarthen itself and Llanelli, and was sometimes called "The Carmarthen Boroughs". A county-wide constituency also existed, called Carmarthenshire, until 1885 (at which point it was split into East and West).

In 1918, the Carmarthen borough constituency was abolished, but the name was transferred to the new county-wide division of Carmarthen.

== Members of Parliament ==
=== MPs 1542–1640 ===
Parliament	Member
1542	Gruffydd Williams
1545	Gruffydd Williams
1547	Thomas Phaer
1553 (Mar)	William Parry
1553 (Oct)	Gruffydd Hygons
1554 (Apr)	William Aubrey
1554 (Nov)	John Parry
1555	William Wightman
1558	John Vaughan
1559	John Parry
1563	John Morgan
1571	?John Vaughan
1572	Thomas Wigmore
1584	John Puckering, sat for Bedford replaced 1584 by Edward Donne Lee
1586	Edward Donne Lee
1588	Gelly Meyrick
1593	Sir Thomas Baskerville
1597	Henry Vaughan
1601	Walter Rice
1604–1611	Sir Walter Rice
1614	William Thomas
1621	Henry Vaughan
1624	Henry Vaughan
1626	Henry Vaughan
1628	Henry Vaughan
1629–1640	No Parliaments summoned

=== 1640–1832 ===
Election	Member	Party
1640 (Apr)	Francis Lloyd	Royalist
1640 (Nov)	Francis Lloyd	Royalist
February 1644	Lloyd disabled from sitting – seat vacant	
1646	William Davies	
December 1648	Davies not recorded as sitting after Pride's Purge	
1653	Carmarthen was not represented in the Barebones Parliament or the First or Second Parliaments of the Protectorate	
January 1659	David Morgan	
May 1659	Not represented in the restored Rump	
April 1660	Arthur Annesley	
1661	Hon. John Vaughan	
1679	Altham Vaughan	
1685	Richard Vaughan	
1725	James Phillips	
1727	Arthur Bevan	
1741	Sir John Philipps	
1747	Thomas Mathews	
1751	Griffith Philipps	
1761	The Earl Verney	
1768	Griffith Philipps	
1774	John Adams	
1780	George Philipps	
1784	John George Philipps	
May 1796	Magens Dorrien Magens	
November 1796	John George Philipps	
1803	Sir William Paxton	
1806	Vice-Admiral George Campbell	Whig
1813	John Campbell	Whig
1821	John Jones	Tory

=== 1832–1918: Carmarthen Boroughs ===
Election	Member	Party
1832	Hon. William Yelverton	Whig
1835	David Lewis	Conservative
1837	David Morris	Whig
1859	David Morris	Liberal
1864	William Morris	Liberal
1868	(Sir) John Cowell-Stepney	Liberal
1874	Charles William Nevill	Conservative
1876	(Sir) Arthur Cowell-Stepney	Liberal
1878 by-election	Benjamin Thomas Williams	Liberal
1882 by-election	John Jones Jenkins	Liberal
1886	Sir Arthur Cowell-Stepney	Liberal
1892	Evan Rowland Jones	Liberal
1895	Sir John Jones Jenkins	Liberal Unionist
1900	Alfred Davies	Liberal
1906	W. Llewelyn Williams	Liberal
1918	Constituency abolished	

== Elections ==
=== Elections in the 1830s ===
General election 1830: Carmarthen Boroughs
Party	Candidate	Votes	%
Tory	John Jones	Unopposed	
Tory hold			

At the 1831 general election, rioting broke out during polling, at which point John Jones and his Whig rival, John George Philipps, had secured three votes apiece. The vote was abandoned and a by-election was called four months later in December.

1831 Carmarthen Boroughs by-election
Party	Candidate	Votes	%
Tory	John Jones	274	57.4
Whig	John George Philipps	203	42.6
Majority		71	14.8
Turnout		477	c. 66.0
Registered electors		c. 723	
Tory hold			

General election 1832: Carmarthen Boroughs
Party	Candidate	Votes	%	±%
Whig	William Henry Yelverton	302	50.6	+8.0
Tory	John Jones	295	49.4	−8.0
Majority		7	1.2	N/A
Turnout		597	87.3	c. +21.3
Registered electors		684		
Whig gain from Tory		Swing	+8.0	

General election 1835: Carmarthen Boroughs
Party	Candidate	Votes	%	±%
Conservative	David Lewis	304	53.1	+3.7
Whig	William Henry Yelverton	268	46.9	−3.7
Majority		36	6.2	N/A
Turnout		572	74.0	−13.3
Registered electors		773		
Conservative gain from Whig		Swing	+3.7	

General election 1837: Carmarthen Boroughs
Party	Candidate	Votes	%	±%
Whig	David Morris	333	53.7	+6.8
Conservative	David Lewis	287	46.3	−6.8
Majority		46	7.4	N/A
Turnout		620	78.9	+4.9
Registered electors		786		
Whig gain from Conservative		Swing	+6.8	

=== Elections in the 1840s ===
General election 1841: Carmarthen Boroughs
Party	Candidate	Votes	%	±%
Whig	David Morris	Unopposed		
Registered electors		938		
Whig hold				

General election 1847: Carmarthen Boroughs
Party	Candidate	Votes	%	±%
Whig	David Morris	Unopposed		
Registered electors		991		
Whig hold				

=== Elections in the 1850s ===
General election 1852: Carmarthen Boroughs
Party	Candidate	Votes	%	±%
Whig	David Morris	Unopposed		
Registered electors		849		
Whig hold				

General election 1857: Carmarthen Boroughs
Party	Candidate	Votes	%	±%
Whig	David Morris	Unopposed		
Registered electors		799		
Whig hold				

General election 1859: Carmarthen Boroughs
Party	Candidate	Votes	%	±%
Liberal	David Morris	Unopposed		
Registered electors		823		
Liberal hold				

=== Elections in the 1860s ===
1864 Carmarthen Boroughs by-election
Party	Candidate	Votes	%	±%
Liberal	William Morris	Unopposed		
Registered electors				
Liberal hold				

General election 1865: Carmarthen Boroughs
Party	Candidate	Votes	%	±%
Liberal	William Morris	Unopposed		
Registered electors		884		
Liberal hold				

General election 1868: Carmarthen Boroughs
Party	Candidate	Votes	%	±%
Liberal	John Cowell-Stepney	1,892	76.1	N/A
Conservative	Morgan Dalrymple Treherne	595	23.9	N/A
Majority		1,297	52.2	N/A
Turnout		2,487	75.7	N/A
Registered electors		3,286		
Liberal hold		Swing	N/A	

=== Elections in the 1870s ===
General election 1874: Carmarthen Boroughs
Party	Candidate	Votes	%	±%
Conservative	Charles William Nevill	1,654	52.8	+28.9
Liberal	Arthur Cowell-Stepney	1,481	47.2	−28.9
Majority		173	5.6	N/A
Turnout		3,135	69.8	−5.9
Registered electors		4,494		
Conservative gain from Liberal		Swing	+28.9	

1876 Carmarthen Boroughs by-election
Party	Candidate	Votes	%	±%
Liberal	Arthur Cowell-Stepney	Unopposed		
Registered electors				
Liberal gain from Conservative				

1878 Carmarthen Boroughs by-election
Party	Candidate	Votes	%	±%
Liberal	Benjamin Thomas Williams	Unopposed		
Registered electors				
Liberal hold				

=== Elections in the 1880s ===
General election 1880: Carmarthen Boroughs
Party	Candidate	Votes	%	±%
Liberal	Benjamin Thomas Williams	1,935	51.5	+4.3
Independent Liberal	John Jones Jenkins	1,825	48.5	N/A
Majority		110	3.0	N/A
Turnout		3,760	70.0	+0.2
Registered electors		5,369		
Liberal gain from Conservative		Swing	N/A	

1882 Carmarthen Boroughs by-election
Party	Candidate	Votes	%	±%
Liberal	John Jones Jenkins	Unopposed		
Registered electors				
Liberal hold				

General election 1885: Carmarthen Boroughs
Party	Candidate	Votes	%	±%
Liberal	John Jones Jenkins	2,884	69.2	+17.7
Conservative	John Simmons Tregoning	1,281	30.8	N/A
Majority		1,603	38.4	+35.4
Turnout		4,165	77.1	+7.1
Registered electors		5,399		
Liberal hold		Swing	N/A	

General election 1886: Carmarthen Boroughs
Party	Candidate	Votes	%	±%
Liberal	Arthur Cowell-Stepney	2,120	52.8	−16.4
Liberal Unionist	John Jones Jenkins	1,898	47.2	+16.4
Majority		222	5.6	−32.8
Turnout		4,018	74.4	−2.7
Registered electors		5,399		
Liberal hold		Swing	−16.4	

=== Elections in the 1890s ===
General election 1892: Carmarthen Boroughs
Party	Candidate	Votes	%	±%
Liberal	Evan Rowland Jones	2,412	52.4	−0.4
Liberal Unionist	John Jones Jenkins	2,187	47.6	+0.4
Majority		225	4.8	−0.8
Turnout		4,599	87.0	+12.6
Registered electors		5,289		
Liberal hold		Swing	−0.4	

General election 1895: Carmarthen Boroughs
Party	Candidate	Votes	%	±%
Liberal Unionist	John Jones Jenkins	2,443	50.5	+2.9
Liberal	Evan Rowland Jones	2,391	49.5	−2.9
Majority		52	1.0	N/A
Turnout		4,834	90.0	+3.0
Registered electors		5,370		
Liberal Unionist gain from Liberal		Swing	+2.9	

=== Elections in the 1900s ===
General election 1900: Carmarthen Boroughs
Party	Candidate	Votes	%	±%
Liberal	Alfred Davies	2,837	58.1	+8.6
Liberal Unionist	John Jones Jenkins	2,047	41.9	−8.6
Majority		790	16.2	N/A
Turnout		4,884	87.9	−2.1
Registered electors		5,557		
Liberal gain from Liberal Unionist		Swing	+8.6	

W.L. Williams

General election 1906: Carmarthen Boroughs
Party	Candidate	Votes	%	±%
Liberal	W. Llewelyn Williams	3,902	68.3	+10.2
Conservative	Vere Ponsonby	1,808	31.7	−10.2
Majority		2,094	36.6	+20.4
Turnout		5,710	91.2	+3.3
Registered electors		6,258		
Liberal hold		Swing	+10.2	

=== Elections in the 1910s ===
General election January 1910: Carmarthen Boroughs
Party	Candidate	Votes	%	±%
Liberal	W. Llewelyn Williams	4,197	68.1	−0.2
Liberal Unionist	Viscount Tiverton	1,965	31.9	+0.2
Majority		2,232	36.2	−0.4
Turnout		6,162	91.0	−0.2
Registered electors		6,772		
Liberal hold		Swing	−0.2	

General election December 1910: Carmarthen Boroughs
Party	Candidate	Votes	%	±%
Liberal	W. Llewelyn Williams	Unopposed		
Registered electors				
Liberal hold				

1912 Carmarthen Boroughs by-election
Party	Candidate	Votes	%	±%
Liberal	W. Llewelyn Williams	3,836	58.6	N/A
Conservative	Henry Coulson Bond	2,555	39.1	N/A
Independent Labour	Frank G Vivian	149	2.3	N/A
Majority		1,281	19.5	N/A
Turnout		6,540	89.8	N/A
Registered electors		7,281		
Liberal hold		Swing	-8.3	

1915 Carmarthen Boroughs by-election
Party	Candidate	Votes	%	±%
Liberal	W. Llewelyn Williams	Unopposed		
Registered electors				
Liberal hold				

== Sources ==
- Robert Beatson, A Chronological Register of Both Houses of Parliament (London: Longman, Hurst, Res & Orme, 1807)
- D Brunton & D H Pennington, Members of the Long Parliament (London: George Allen & Unwin, 1954)
- Cobbett's Parliamentary history of England, from the Norman Conquest in 1066 to the year 1803 (London: Thomas Hansard, 1808)
- The Constitutional Year Book for 1913 (London: National Union of Conservative and Unionist Associations, 1913)
- F W S Craig, British Parliamentary Election Results 1832–1885 (2nd edition, Aldershot: Parliamentary Research Services, 1989)
- J Holladay Philbin, Parliamentary Representation 1832 – England and Wales (New Haven: Yale University Press, 1965)
