= Mayor of Carmarthen =

Position of Carmarthen Town Council, Wales

The Mayor, Burgesses, and Commonalty of the Borough of Carmarthen were established by a royal charter of 1604. The Mayorship was transferred in 1835 to Carmarthen Borough Council, and following local government reorganization in 1974 to Carmarthen Town Council.

== List of mayors ==
Year	Name
circa 1300	Walter Malenphant
1360	John Andrew Spilman
1401–1414	David Lloyd
1415–1419	John Moore
1420–1424	William Read
1425 -1426	Nicholas Blewitt
1427–1430	John Willy Fisher
1431–1433	William Read
1434–1439	John Moore
1440–1441	Nicholas Blewitt
1442–1448	Stephen Griffith
1449–1458	Lewis ab Rees Gethin
1459–1462	Rees Howell
1463–1469	John Wardibeck
1470–1471	Rees Howell
1472	Thomas Gethin
1473–1474	William Weithie
1475–1480	John Wardbeck
1481	Rees Howell
1482–1483	John Higgon
1484–1487	Jenkin Lloyd Hire
1488	John Higgon
1489	Sir Rhys ap Thomas
1490–1492	Rees ab Ievan ab Eynon
1493	Morris Read
1494	Richard ab Owen
1495–1496	Sir Rhys ap Thomas
1497	Rees ab Ievan ab Eynon
1498	Stephen Gravell
1499–1500	Hugh Higgon
1501–1503	Sir Rhys ap Thomas
1504	Jeffery Dier
1505–1507	Sir Rhys ap Thomas
1508–1509	Richard Read
1510	William Morris
1511	Philip Rees ab Thomas Vychan
1512	Sir Giffith Rhys KT
1513	William ab Gwilim With
1514	Griffith Rhys
1515	Gwalter Dier
1516–1517	Philip David
1518	Morgan Taylor
1519	John Thomas ab Gwilym
1520	John Hire
1521 -1522	Richard ab Gwalter
1523	Griffith Higgon
1524	David ab David
1525	John Jenins
1526	Thomas ab Owen
1527	John ab Rees ab Ievan
1528–1529	Philip David
1530	David Llewelyn
1531	Griffith Higgon
1532–1533	Sir Walter Devereux KT
1534	John David Lloyd
1535–1536	Sir Walter Devereux KT
1537	Richard Devereux
1538	Martin Davy
1539	Thomas Brine
1540–1541	David Rees
1542	William Read
1543	Thomas Hancocke
1544	Thomas Walter
1545	Morgan ab David
1546	John Jenins
1547	Martin Davy
1547	David Richards
1548	Richard ab Ievan
1549	Griffith William
1550	Griffith Donne
1551	David Nash
1552	Griffith Higgon
1553	Thomas Morgan
1554	Jenkin David
1555	John Vaughan
1556	John Griffith
1557	Griffith Donne
1558	Hymphrey Toye
1559	Thomas Beynon
1560	Rees Penry
1561	William Davies
1562	Jenkin David
1563	David John Read
1564	John Vaughan
1565	Robert Brit
1566	Griffith John David Lloyd
1567	Thomas Lewis
1568	Griffith ab Eynon
1569	Lewis Philip David
1570	Richard Lewis
1571	Lewis William
1572	Jenkin David
1573 -1574	Richard Phillips
1575	Walter Vaughan.
1576	Griffith ab Ievan
1577	Walter Vaughan
1578	David ab Ievan Taylor
1579–1580	William Phillips
1581	Walter Vaughan
1582	Griffith ab Ievan
1583	Robert Toye
1584	Edward Middleton
1585	David Edwards
1586	Thomas Nothed
1587	Thomas Atkins
1588	Philip William
1589	Griffith Howell
1590	John Morris
1591	Harry Owen
1592	John Brit
1593	Thomas Davies
1594	Robert Brit
1595	John Fisher
1596	Morris Lloyd
1597	William Thomas Morris
1597	David Edwardes
1598	Walter Vaughan
1598	Philip William
1599	Henry Vaughan
1600	Henry Phillips
1601	Thomas Rees
1602	William Thomas
1603	Ievan Thomas
1604	Sir John Vaughan KT
1605	Thomas Parry
1606	Thomas Atkins
1607	Ievan Long
1608	John Griffith John
1609	Thomas Vaughan
1610	Martin Beynon
1611	William Lewes
1612	Thomas Higgs
1613	Thomas Davids
1614	Edward Atkins
1614	Martin Beynon
1615	Richard Jeanes
1616	David Edwards
1617	John Bowen
1618	Griffith Davids
1619	Griffith Lewis
1620	Thomas Atkins
1621	Morgan Davids
1622	David Beven
1623	Richard Barrett
1624	John Vaughan
1625	Thomas Muggall
1625	William Thomas
1626	Griffith Beynon
1627	Anthony Johns
1628	Griffith Read
1629	William Lewis
1630	Richard Jeanes
1631	John Bowen
1632	Griffith Lewis
1633	Thomas Atkins
1634	Thomas Woode
1635	Thomas Jones
1636	Richard Thomas
1637	Robert Lewis
1638	Attwill Taylor
1639	Lewis Johnes
1640	Rowland Phillips
1641	Morris James
1642	George Ockley
1643	David Bevan
1644	Thomas Phillips
1645–1646	Thomas Phillips
1647	George Jeanes
1648	Thomas Jones
1649	Dawkin Gove
1650	Robert Brend
1651	John Hughes
1652	David Edwardes
1653	Richard Thomas
1654	Edward Jones
1655	John Vaughan
1656	Robert Brit
1657	William Gower
1658	Griffith Beynon
1659	Walter Thomas
1660 -1661	John Hughes
1661	Anthony Jones
1662	George Lewis
1663	John Ockley
1664	Robert Lewis
1665	Thomas Beynon
1666	John Scurlocke
1667	Richard Leigh
1668–1669	John Muggell
1670	William Brigstocke
1671	Sir Henry Vaughan KT
1672	Robert Lewis
1673	Altham Vaughan
1674	John Vaughan
1675	John Williams
1676	Thomas Griffith
1677	Thomas Jones
1678	Dawkin Gove
1679	Thomas Newsham
1680	David Jones
1681	Edward Gower
1682	Edward Jones
1683	Owen Brigstocke
1684	William Jones
1685	John Phillips
1686	Charles de Lancy
1687	Sir Sackville Crow
1688	Rowland Gwynne
1689	Sir Rice William KT
1689	Martin Beynon
1690	John Ryder
1691	Thomas Rogers
1692	George Catchmaid
1693	Howell David
1694	Thomas Powell
1695	Griffith Lewis
1696	Morris James
1697	John Davies
1698	Theophilus Bevan
1699	Griffith William
1699	William Brigstocke
1700	John Williams
1701	Henry Vaughan
1702	Sir Anthony Rudd Bart
1703	John Scurlock
1704	Thomas Mainwaring
1705	Anthony Jones
1706	William Brigstocke
1706	William Jones
1707	Anthony Jones
1708	John Newsham
1709	James Phillips
1710	William Gower
1711	John Vaughan
1712	Nathaniel Morgan
1713	John Morgan
1714	Rees Thomas
1715	Francis Lloyd
1716	John Thomas
1717	Thomas Jones
1718	Thomas Lloyd
1719	David Lloyd
1719–1720	Benjamin Davies
1721	Morgan Davies
1722	William Thomas
1723	Arnold Bowen
1724	Peter Chetle
1725	John Lewis
1726	John Roberts
1727	John Williams
1728	Thomas Rees
1729	George Davies
1730	John Phillips
1731	Henry Price
1732	John Leigh
1733	Robert Rees
1734	James Johnson
1735	William Rees
1736	David Lewes
1737	Edward Davies
1738	John Newsham
1739	Charles Morgan
1740	John Lloyd
1741	John Phillips
1742	John Williams
1743	William Thomas
1744	John Morgan
1745	John Phillips
1746	Evan Williams
1747	Anthony Rogers
1747	William Thomas
1748	John Phillips
1749	Evan Williams
1750	David Lloyd
1750	D. Thomas
1751	John Jones
1752	John Lewis
1753	Francis Morgan
1754	David Edwardes
1754	John Adams
1755	Dr Roger Phillips
1756	William Leigh
1756	Evan Davies
1757	John Evan
1757	Charles Webb
1758	William Leigh
1759	Arthur Jones
1759	Robert Morgan
1759	Admiral Thos Jones
1760	Woodford Rice
1760	James Wilson
1761	James Evans
1761	1. James ab William Brenin
1762	Edward Read
1762	William Morgan
1763	John Evans
1763	Vaughan Horton
1763	James Williams
1764	Albert Davids
1765	Edward Parry
1766	Francis Morgan
1766	Edward Parry
1767	Vaughan Horton
1768	George Rice
1769	Arthur Jones
1770	Morris Howell
1771	Henry Morris
1772	David Edwardes
1773	William Williams
1774	George Phillips
1775	Richard le Davids
1776	David Williams
1777	Walter George
1778	George Evans
1780	George Lewis
1781	John Morgan
1782	John Lloyd
1783	Thomas Howell
1784	John William
1785	John George Phillips
1786	Thomas Blome
1787	Morgan Lewis
1788	Jeremiah Owen
1789	Richard Howell
1790	William Price
1791	Hon. George Talbot Rice
1792	Herbert Ball
1793	Thomas Williams
1794	William Lewes
1795	William Bonnell
1795	William Price
1795	John Morgan
1796	Josiah Llewelyn
1797	David John Edwardes
1798	Charles Morgan
1799	Richard Mansel Phillips
1800	William Morris
1801	John Morgan
1802	James Hughes
1803	Sir William Paxton
1804	Thomas Morris
1805	William Morgan
1806	Charles Morgan MD
1807	John Hughes
1808	John William Hughes
1809	John, Lord Cawdor
1810	John Jones
1811	John Geo Phillips
1812	Mark Roch
1813	David Morris
1814	Sir Geo. G. Williams BT
1815	Charles Morgan MD
1816	Charles Morgan
1817	John Geo. Phillips
1818	John Hughes
1819	Thomas Morris
1820	Charles Morgan
1821	John Hughes
1822	Thomas Morris
1823	Charles Morgan
1824	David John Edwardes
1825	Daniel Prytherch
1826	Robert Waters
1827	Grismond Phillips
1828	Aaron Thomas
1829	John Bowen MD
1830	David Jones
1831	Daniel John Edwardes
1832	Daniel Prytherch
1833	Grismond Phillips
1834	Aaron Timms
1835	David Davies
1836	Capt John George Phillips
1837–1838	Thomas Morris
1839	William Phillips
1840	Charles Jones
1841	Thomas Taylor Webb
1842	William Morris
1843	Edmond Hills Stacey
1844	William Morris
1845	George Davies
1846	Thomas Charles Morris
1847	Samuel Tardrew
1848	William George Thomas
1849	John Lewis
1850–1851	Valentine Davies
1852–1853	William Morris
1854–1855	Lewis Morris
1856	Thomas Charles Morris
1857	John Lewis Phillips
1858	James Rowlands
1859	Henry Norton
1860–1861	John Thomas
1862–1863	Wm de Grunchy Warren
1864	Valentine Davies
1865	John Adams
1866	Robert Brodie
1867	E. D. Bowen Jones
1868	David Davies
1869 -1870	John Lewis
1871	Henry Norton
1872	John Thomas
1873	Wm de Grunchy Warren
1874	David Lewis
1875	David M. Morgan
1876	David Bonnell Edwards
1877	Thomas Mostyn Davies
1878	Thomas Thomas
1879	Richard William Richards
1880	Charles William Jones
1881	John Morris
1882–1884	James Jenkyn Jones
1885	John Lewis
1886	Thomas Mostyn Davies
1887	William Richard Edwards
1888	Edward Alfred Rogers
1889	Howell Howells
1890	Thomas Davies
1891–1892	Thomas Jenkins
1893	James Davies
1894	Henry Cadle
1895–1898	Henry Brunel White
1899	John Lewis
1900	Walter Spurell
1901 -1902	Edward Colby Evans
1903	Walter Spurell
1904 -1905	Edward Alfred Rogers
1906	Henry Evan Blagdon Richards
1907	Joseph Nicholas Williams
1908	John Lewis
1909	John Crossman
1910	Walter Lloyd
1911	William Thomas
1912 -1913	John Beynon Arthur
1914–1917	John Lewis
1918–1919	Alderman William Evans
1920–1921	Andrew Fuller Mills
1922	Lewis David Thomas
1923	John Richards
1924	Andrew Fuller Mills
1925	John Hinds
1926	Andrew Fuller Mills
1927	Walter Spurell
1928–1929	David John Davies
1930–1932	William Jones
1933–1935	Thomas Lloyd
1936–1937	John Owen Morgans
1938–1941	James Islwyn Davies
1942–1944	Philip William Trefor Thomas
1945	John Russell
1945	Lewis Jones
1946–1947	John Jenkins
1948–1950	Enoch Davies
1950–1952	William David Jones
1952–1954	Charles Wright Griffiths
1954–1956	John James Lewis
1956–1958	Clifford Caron Jones
1958–1959	T. J. Thomas (Died in Office)
1959–1961	M. E. Clifford Jones
1961 (May to Sept)	Alice. K. White (Died in Office)
1961–1963	T. Idwal Jones
1963–1964	Alderman Ellis J. Powell
1964–1965	Sidney Jeremy
1965–1966	D. D. Harries
1966–1967	William Wynford Francis Davies
1967–1968	Charles Wright Griffiths
1968	Leslie Hyde Howells
1969	David Jones Howells
1970	William Colvin
1971	Ronald Byles Evans
1972	Lawrence Victor Rice
Since the passing of the Local Government Act (1972)
1973	William Roy Nicholl
1974–1975	Ivor Morgan Morris
1975–1976	Thomas James Hurley
1976–1977	Samuel David Thomas
1977–1978	Thomas Henry Gwyn Davies
1978–1979	Gwyn Morris Williams
1979–1980	Joyce Lodwick
1980–1981	Helen M. Thomas
1981–1982	Peter Hughes Griffiths
1982–1983	Samuel David Thomas
1983–1984	June Williams
1984–1985	John Elfed Williams
1985–1986	Kenneth Bryan Maynard
1986–1987	Malcolm Morgan Jones
1987–1988	Mary Kathleen Davies
1988–1989	Siân Morris
1989–1990	William Gwynoro Jones
1990–1991	Peter Hughes Griffiths
1991–1992	John Elfed Williams
1992–1993	Sarah Mary Lorraine Maynard
1993–1994	Richard John Goodridge
1994–1995	Agnes Maria Dunbar
1995–1996	Kenneth Bryan Maynard
1996–1997	June Williams
1997–1998	Richard Edwards
1998–1999	Sioned Mair Richards
1999–2000	Peter Hughes Griffiths
2000–2001	Dr Ioan Aled Matthews
2001–2002	Llyr Huws Griffiths
2002–2003	William Gwynoro Jones
2003–2004	Peter Hughes Griffiths
2004–2005	June Williams
2005–2006	Phillip Grice
2006–2007	Richard Evans
2007–2008	Aled Williams
2008–2009	Anthony Jenkins
2009–2010	Kenneth Wigley Lloyd
2010–2011	Alan Douglas Thomas Speake
2011–2012	Reverend Tom Talog Defis
2012–2013	Philip Grice
2013–2014	Douglas Rose
2014–2015	Arwel Lloyd
2015–2016	Barry Williams
2020-2022	Gareth Howell John (term extended due to Covid 19 pandemic)
2022–2023	Miriam Margaret Moules
