= Davies Turner =

Davies Turner Plc
- Type: Public
- Industry: Freight Forwarding
- Founded: 25 May 1870; 156 years ago in United Kingdom
- Headquarters: London, England, United Kingdom
- Key people: Philip Stephenson (Chairman); Michael Stephenson (Managing Director)
- Revenue: ▲£191.1 million (2019)
- Operating income: ▲£5 million (2019)
- Net income: ▲£4.1 million (2019)
- Website: www.daviesturner.com

Davies Turner Plc is a British based multimodal transport, logistics, freight forwarding, and warehousing organisation founded in 1870. The company specialises in air, road and sea transportation. It has 23 branches across the U.K. and a head office in London. It is an unlisted public company.

== History ==
=== Foundation ===
The company was founded in 1870 by Alfred Davies, who later became Member of Parliament for the Carmarthen parliamentary constituency.

=== Twentieth Century ===
Davies Turner replaced its horse and carriage fleet with motorised vehicles in the 1910s. During the Great Depression the company began to move into new areas such as packing art work and doing home removals for the American and European market in order to generate new revenue streams.

In the 1940s Davies Turner used their warehousing facilities to store furniture and other items recovered from damaged building during the Blitz.

In 1959 the company began to build its headquarters in Battersea, London, UK.

In 1990 Davies Turner Air Cargo Ltd was formed. The company's air cargo operation is based at the World Freight Terminal at Manchester Airport.

The company is a partner of System Alliance Europe.
