= Hafen (Osnabrück) =

District of Osnabrück, Lower Saxony, Germany

Coordinates: 52.2833°N 8.0167°E

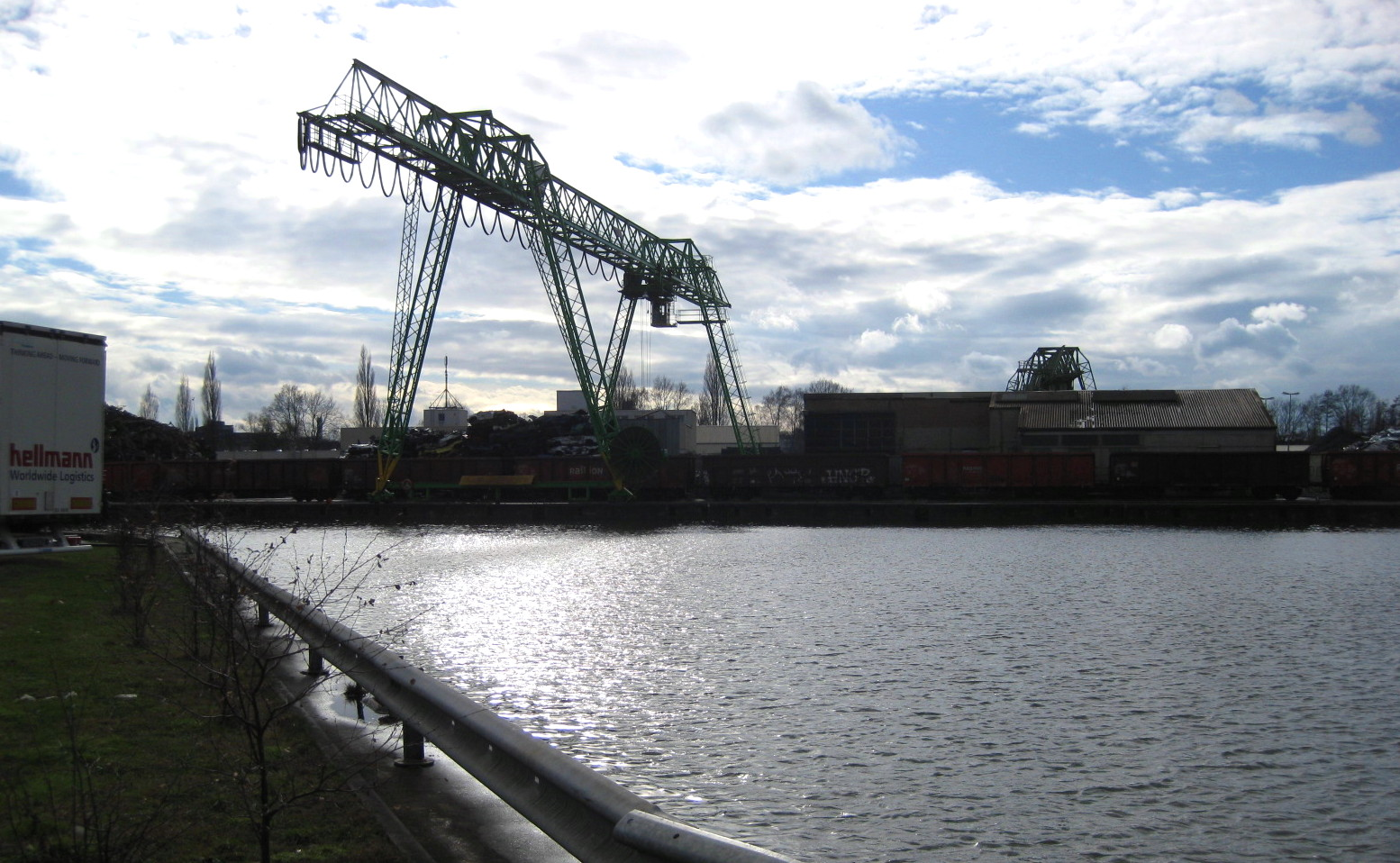
City harbour

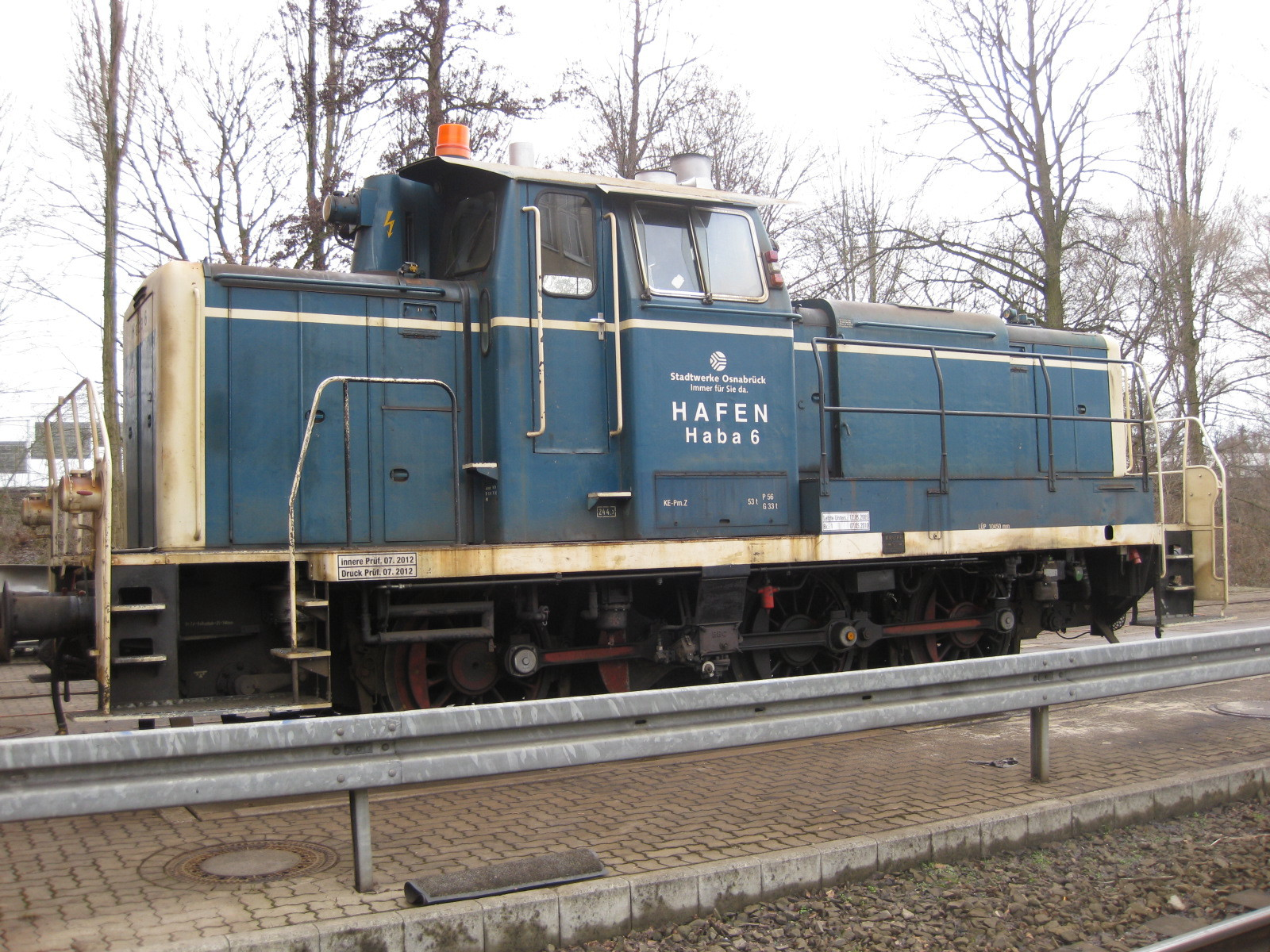
Harbour railway

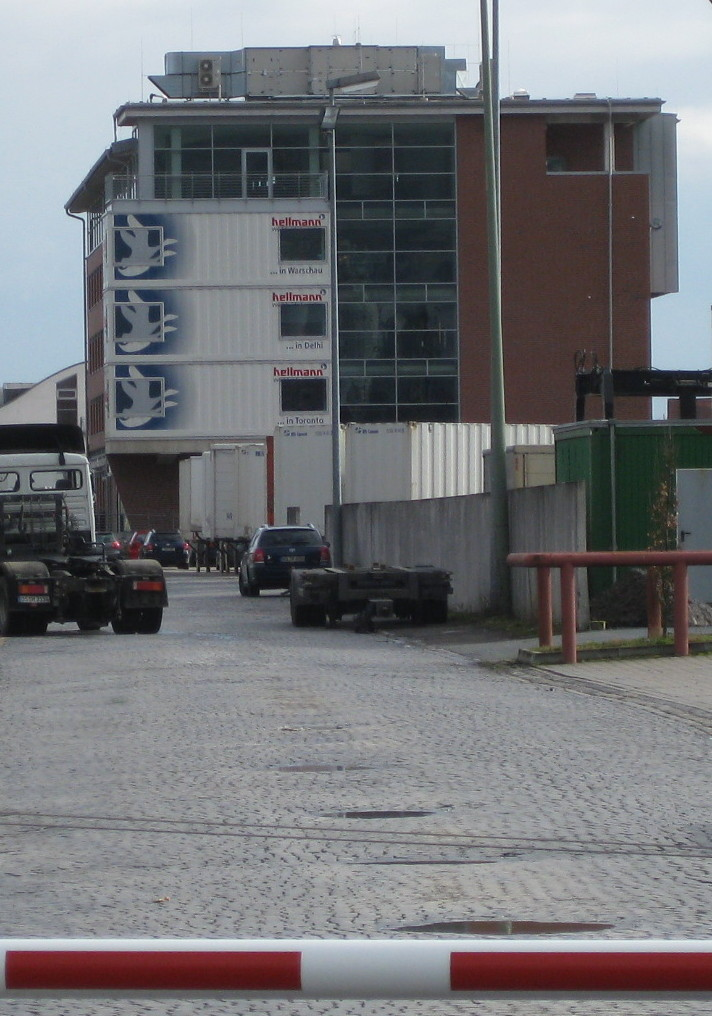
Former Speicher III building (Warehouse No. III), used by Hellmann Worldwide Logistics as office space since 2008

Hafen (German pronunciation: [ˈhaːfn̩], Harbour) is a district of Osnabrück, Lower Saxony. Germany. It is located in the north-west of the city and had a population of roughly 2,687 residents in 1,454 households as of late 2022. 15 year earlier the city had 2,372 residents. It covers an area of 406 hectares.

The most important aspect of the area's economy is the city harbour from which the district takes its name; primarily home to industrial estates. The harbour is connected to the Mittelland Canal by the Osnabrück branch canal (termed the “Stichkanal” or “Zweigkanal”). The construction of the harbour basin, along with the closing off of the area, began in 1912; in 1916 the first ship was berthed here, one year after the completion of the branch canal – the barge “Minden 52”, which had transported 475 tons of oats to Osnabrück, arrived on 3 April.

1.28 million tons of goods were handled in the harbour area during 2004; goods transported by ship accounted for 629,000 tons of this total. In 2008 1.24 million tons were handled; there was, however, a marked decrease in 2009.

The local Hafenbahn (harbour railway) is run by the Stadtwerke Osnabrück (Osnabrück Public Utilities), which also runs the harbour itself.

Businesses based at the harbour include Hellmann Worldwide Logistics, founded in 1871 as a forwarding company and today active internationally. The company uses the former Speicher III (Warehouse No. III) as an office building; having been built in 1934 as a granary, it was redesigned substantially from 2008 onwards and has since won awards in its new function. Another business based around this area is the paper manufacturer Ahlstrom.

Since 2007, passenger ships have once again been running along the branch canal.

The Hafen district is home to a former barracks building used by the British armed forces based in Germany – the Roberts Barracks. The British armed forces took until the end of March 2009 to leave Osnabrück completely.

Around Bramscher Straße there used to be a tram connection on line 2, running from Haste via Bramscher Straße, Hasetor, Nikolaiort and Neumarkt towards Schölerberg.

The Osnabrück-Piesberg railway station is located in the northern part of the Hafen district; it runs special services using museum trains, which travel via Osnabrück-Altstadt towards the Hauptbahnhof (central station) on several days every year.

== History ==
After the decision was made not to extend the Mittelland Canal – as originally planned – through the cities of Hildesheim, Salzgitter and Osnabrück (due to reasons of cost and longitudinal profile), it was decided in 1905 that branch canals should be set up so that the emergent industry in these cities could profit from the favourable transport conditions offered by the Mittelland Canal. Osnabrück's branch canal starts in the Hafen area and leads towards Bramsche, where it joins the Mittelland Canal. The initial plan was to have the branch canal lead to the smelting works in Georgsmarienhütte; this however was dropped due to the costs entailed. In 1912 work started on closing off the harbour area and delineation of the harbour basin. On 3 April 1916 the first barge – which had travelled from Bremen via Minden – arrived at Osnabrück harbour, carrying 475 tons of oats.

== Works ==
- Feige, B., “Der Osnabrücker Hafen” in Heimat-Jahrbuch Osnabrücker Land (Heimatbund Osnabrücker Land e.V, 2001), pps. 73 + 85
