= Hafen =

Hafen or Häfen may refer to the following topics:

== Places ==
- Düsseldorf-Hafen, a district of Düsseldorf, Germany
- Hafen (Osnabrück), a district of Osnabrück, Germany

== People ==
- Bruce C. Hafen (born 1940), American attorney
- John Hafen (1856–1910), American artist
- LeRoy Reuben Hafen (1893–1985), American historian
- Margret Hafen (born 1946), German alpine skier

== Other ==
- Hafen Slawkenbergius, a fictional character in Laurence Sterne's Tristram Shandy
- Eisenbahn und Häfen GmbH, a German rail company
