= Evan Rowland Jones =

Welsh politician and American consul

Jones in 1895

Major Evan Rowland Jones (30 September 1840 – 16 January 1920) was a soldier, American consul in Newcastle and Cardiff and latterly a Welsh Liberal politician who served as MP for Carmarthen Boroughs from 1892 until 1895.

Having lost the seat in 1895, by a narrow margin, Jones was again approached to contest the seat in 1903 when there was dissatisfaction with the sitting member, Alfred Davies. Ultimately, however, Davies withdrew in favour of W. Llewelyn Williams.

Jones did not stand for Parliament again.

Parliament of the United Kingdom
Preceded by Sir Arthur Stepney	Member of Parliament for Carmarthen; 1892–1895	Succeeded by John Jones Jenkins
