= Lamprecht Transport =

Swiss transport and logistics company

Lamprecht Transport, Ltd.
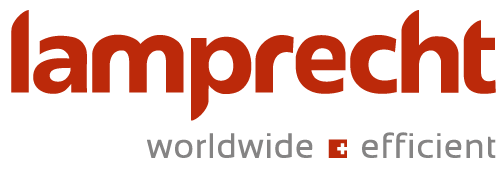
- Company type: Private
- Industry: Logistics service provider
- Founded: January 1945; April 1948 (incorporated)
- Founder: Adolf Lamprecht
- Headquarters: Basel, Switzerland
- Key people: Thomas Lamprecht (CEO and Vice President)
- Website: Lamprecht Transport

Lamprecht Transport is a Swiss transport and logistics company headquartered in Basel, Switzerland. There are 6 branches in Switzerland and 9 branches in the United States under its American subsidiary American Lamprecht Transport. As one of the main logistics companies in Switzerland, it has been in existence for more than 70 years.

Lamprecht Transport has been run by the Lamprecht family in Switzerland for three generations.

== History ==
Lamprecht Transport was founded in 1945 by Adolf Lamprecht right after World War II, which was documented in a 1945 article by the Swiss newspaper Basellandschaftliche Zeitung. Its first transport was a cargo of 90 tons of fresh fish from Denmark to Switzerland in 1945 that made its way through the destruction of war-torn Germany. From its humble roots in post-war Europe, Lamprecht Transport has since ridden the post-war European economic boom to become a key logistics provider in Europe.

In 1945, Lamprecht Transport opened its branch office at Zurich Airport, and focused on booming air freight coming in and out of there. In 1955, the company got into the transit traffic business between Germany and Italy. In the 1950s, it also gained a foothold in other European countries. A German subsidiary was later founded in Singen, a southern German town on the border with northern Switzerland. In 1965, further offices were opened in Geneva. As trans-Atlantic air freight greatly expanded during the 1960s, Lamprecht Transport expanded into the United States and founded its subsidiary American Lamprecht Transport, Inc.

After the death of Adolf Lamprecht Sr. his son Adolf Lamprecht Jr. took over corporate management. In 1991, Thomas Lamprecht took over management of the company. Under Thomas Lamprecht's leadership, Lamprecht Transport continued to steadily expand, and has gone into new areas including trade fair and event logistics and pharmaceutical logistics.

== Lamprecht Museum ==
Lamprecht Transport also runs and maintains Lamprecht Museum, a history museum in Basel that is open to the public. The museum is located close to the Basel SBB railway station in downtown Basel. There are many exhibits on the history of transport and logistics in Europe starting from the end of World War II. The museum provides a fascinating insight into the evolution of freight transport during Europe's post-war economic miracle.

== Services ==
Lamprecht Transport internationally transports diverse goods, including chemicals and pharmaceutical products, machinery, food products, and electronics. Within Europe, the goods are transported by road and rail, and by air and sea to other continents. Lamprecht runs group transport to and from all major commercial and industry centers in Europe. Lamprecht Transport also offers many different logistics and warehousing services, including packing, repacking, labeling, marking, and neutralization. It also offers administrative services (such as creating dispatch documents) and product warehousing. The company is a partner of System Alliance Europe.

In August 2018, Lamprecht opened a new logistics center in Pratteln, northern Switzerland.

== US subsidiary ==
American Lamprecht Transport, Inc.
- Company type: Private
- Industry: Logistics service provider
- Founded: 1966
- Headquarters: Chicago, United States
- Key people: Gary Warnecke (CEO)
- Number of employees: 100+
- Website: American Lamprecht Transport

Lamprecht Transport has a subsidiary in the United States called American Lamprecht Transport, Inc., with major commercial centers located throughout the United States. Other than its head office in Chicago, American Lamprecht Transport also has offices in Denver, New York, Baltimore, Greenville, Miami, Houston, Los Angeles, and San Francisco.

American Lamprecht Transport was founded during the 1960s in the US by its parent Swiss company Lamprecht Transport due to rapidly increasing trans-Atlantic air freight traffic during the post-war years. Its parent company was founded in 1945 at the end of World War II and is a key Swiss logistics provider.

Like its Swiss parent company, American Lamprecht Transport transports diverse goods internationally, ranging from electronics to machinery to food products, and provides freight forwarding services. In 2016, AmCar Freight merged with American Lamprecht Transport and changed its name to Amcar-Lamprecht.
