= J. F. Morris =

Welsh solicitor and politician (1851–1924)

James Frederick Morris (1851 – 25 September 1924) was a Welsh solicitor and Liberal politician.

== Legal career ==
Morris practised as J. F. Morris & Son with his son, Harold Spencer Morris, in Carmarthen. He was appointed a Commissioner of oaths in South Wales.

Morris served as president of the Carmarthen Orpheus Glee Society in the early 1900s. In 1907, Morris was again appointed honorary legal advisor to the Carmarthen Attractions Committee.

== Political career ==
Morris stood as a Liberal Party councillor for Carmarthen Eastern Ward in the municipal election of 1882 (in which he finished second with 279 votes). In 1889, he received twenty-five letters and telegrams relating to the selection of a Liberal Unionist candidate for the 1889 West Carmarthenshire by-election and to attempts at co-operation with local Conservatives. The main correspondents were Robert Bickersteth and Sir T.J. Leigh Maclachlan.

In the 1890s, Morris served as president of the Blue Ribbonism Society in Carmarthen.

In 1895, Morris invited John Jones Jenkins, 1st Baron Glantawe to stand as the Liberal Unionist candidate in Carmarthen. One year previously, in 1894, Morris had stood as the Liberal Unionist candidate and finished first. He then stood in the municipal elections of 1897 (in which he finished second with 445 votes), 1900 (in which he finished fourth with 309 votes), and 1901 (in which he finished first with 446 votes).

In November 1902, Morris was offered the office of Mayor of Carmarthen for the ensuing year, but declined.

In the 1910s, Morris served as chairman of the Carmarthen Sports and Attractions Committee.

== Other work ==
In 1879, Morris was appointed treasurer of the Wesleyan Chapel, Carmarthen.

He served as chairman of The Salvation Army (Carmarthen) in the early 1900s.

Morris was a patron of the Carmarthenshire Fallen Heroes Fund. A letter written by him to Sir Alfred Lewis Jones in 1905 procured a "very handsome donation" to the fund.

In 1911, Morris headed the Carmarthen contingent of the National Eisteddfod of Wales. Three months before it was scheduled, he secured the greater part of the 104 local subscribers to the Estddfod funds, enabling the Carmarthen contingent to checkmate the efforts of their Abergavenny counterparts.

== Personal life ==
J. F. Morris married Catherine Jones, daughter of David Jones of Carmarthen, on 25 February 1879.

In 1897, Roman ruins were discovered on the site of Morris' nineteenth century mansion. The principal room excavated measured about fourteen square feet; the cement floor had been completely destroyed in the making of the modern cellar. Morris subsequently obtained 3 bronze coins from the reign of Constantius Chlorus, other assorted coins, and the remains of a Roman bath.
