= Charles William Jones =

Welsh politician and magistrate (1836–1908)

Charles William Jones JP
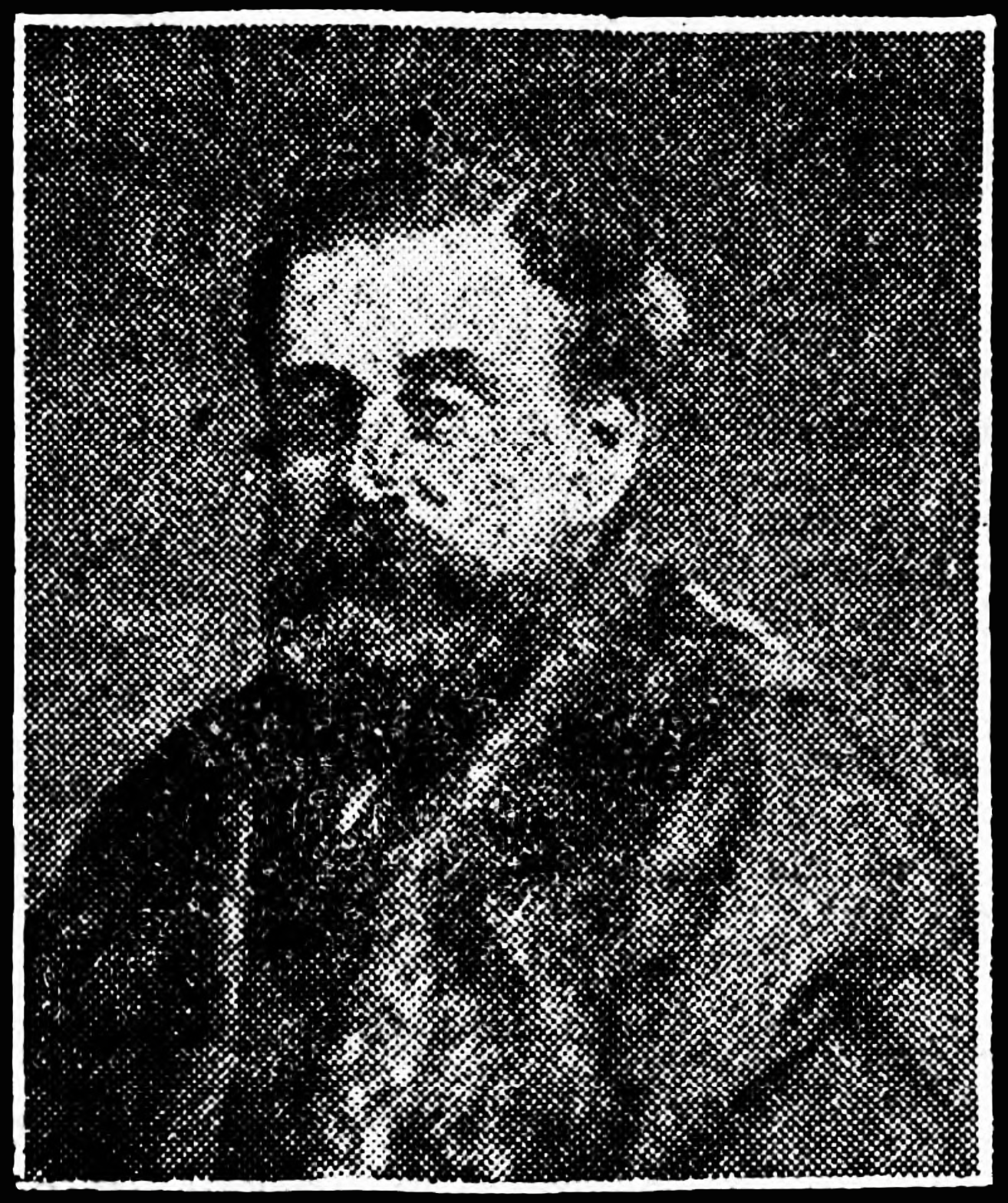
- Photograph of Jones by Howell & Adams Photographer, Carmarthen
- Born: 1836; Carmarthen, Wales
- Died: 15 July 1908 (aged 71–72); Carmarthen, Wales
- Political party: Conservative Party

Charles William Bowen-Jones JP (1836 – 15 July 1908) was a Welsh politician and magistrate in the county of Carmarthenshire.

== Early life ==
Jones was born in 1836 in the Welsh borough of Carmarthen, the son of William Edward Bowen-Jones, a justice of the peace and mayor of Carmarthen.

== Career ==
Jones was admitted to the Pharmaceutical Society on 17 April 1860 and succeeded his father as an apothecary in Lammas Street, Carmarthen. Being possessed of wealth, he retired in the mid-1870s and entered politics. He was elected to the Carmarthen Borough Council as a Conservative shortly after and then to the aldermanic bench, a position he relinquished when it became necessary for him to seek re-election at the hands of the ratepayers. He was twice elected as Mayor of Carmarthen and was placed on the commission of the peace for the borough and county. By the late 1890s, he was also elected Vice-chairman of Carmarthenshire in recognition of his services to Carmarthen and the monthly courts of St. Clears and Llanboidy.

Jones was also an impartial administrator of the law and took a keen interest in magisterial work. For many years he was elected successively as a representative of the court of quarter sessions on the Standing Joint Committee, and he was a member of the Visiting Committee to H.M. Prison, Carmarthen. Jones was a governor of the Carmarthenshire Infirmary and chairman of the directors of the Carmarthen Gas Company.

== Marriage ==
Jones married Frances Agnes Vaughan, the daughter of Col. Eugene James Vaughan, on 13 June 1867 in St Peter's Church, Carmarthen. After the marriage, they resided at Lammas Street, Carmarthen near the business of Jones' father, where he spent much of his time. They had a stillbirth in January 1868.

According to Jones, they lived comfortably together until the end of 1871, when she began an affair with John Lewis, a married timber merchant and former Mayor of Carmarthen. He forbade her from seeing Lewis, but she continued to do so. Shortly after her father's death in October 1871, he gave her a push as she was getting out of bed and told her to sleep with the servant. Several anonymous letters regarding the affair were sent to Jones, which he always showed her. Because of their differences, they took meals separately. When she miscarried in November 1872, he walked into her room, locked the door, and told her that many a man would strike her had he been provoked like this, but ostensibly he did not strike her.

In July of the following year, Jones received a letter addressed to his wife, which he believed had been written by Lewis. It read "Dear dear Fanny, meet me where you did last night and we can make an appointment for to-night." In April 1874, it was arranged that she would stay at her mother's and he signed an agreement offering to take her back after six months, so long as the affair did not continue and he found her conduct acceptable. After this event, it was observed that she and Lewis often met clandestinely and they were seen in fields together under adulterous circumstances. At the seaside village of Llansteffan, they were seen emerging from a cave.

=== Jones vs. Jones and Lewis ===
The case of Jones vs. Jones and Lewis, a petition for a dissolution of the marriage between Charles William Jones and Frances Agnes Jones on the ground of her adultery with John Lewis, was heard on two separate occasions on 19 and 22 July 1875 before James Hannen, Baron Hannen and a special jury. Jones and Lewis denied his charging them with adultery and she alleged that he had acted cruelly towards her. Jones denied the charge of cruelty, his angry words having been admissible by the intimacy between his wife and Lewis.

Under cross-examination, Jones said he did not remember calling his wife a "barren b–" and that she did not take care of herself when pregnant as he had asked her to. They had often talked about not having children, he said, and he often took her out to concerts and the circus. He could not recall having said, as claimed, that hopes of his father not remarrying were blighted hy her, because she had had no children, but he could recall plainly that she had wished she was dead and that some mention of divorce was made. Regardless of the intimacy between his wife and Lewis, he said he had always tried to remain on friendly terms with her, but was still much annoyed. He did not say he wanted a divorce, but admitted that he would marry again in such an event. Jones told the court that he was naturally of a jealous disposion, as his wife was a very attractive woman and popular with most people.

Under re-examination, Jones said he had not had any disputes with his wife until he discovered that she was being unfaithful. He did not take objection to her having amusement, but did object to her going out by herself at night and meeting John Lewis. After his wife had left, he recalled that he had received several letters from her, including one that commenced "Dear Charles", asking him to take her back. Several witnesses were then called to give their accounts and recalled seeing his wife and Lewis in clandestine circumstances.

The jury found that Jones had not been guilty of cruelty and that Lewis and Jones' wife had not been guilty of adultery. Baron Hannen said he hoped a resumption of the agreement entered into of cohabitation in six months might be carried out.

== Death and funeral ==
Jones died on 15 July 1908 at his residence Gwynfryn, a Grade II* listed building in Penllwyn Park, Carmarthen. He was discovered by his housekeeper at about 8:15 pm lying unresponsive on the floor, having been heard by her at about 8:00 pm moving about his room. In the time leading up to his death, Jones had suffered a paralytic stroke, and although treated for heart trouble, he had been apprehensive of a sudden death.

His funeral at the Carmarthen Cemetery was conducted by the Archeadon of Carmarthen Owen Evans. Amongst those present at the cortège were James Hills-Johnes, Dudley Williams-Drummond, and William Henry Morgan Yelverton.

== Will ==
Jones' will was written on 27 July 1904 and his bequests were the subject of much media and public attention. The will, of which probate was granted in London containing four codicils dated 21 March 1906, 15 March 1907, 1 October 1907, and 22 October 1907, bequeathed thousands of pounds to his servants and several charities, but only a shilling to his wife.

Jones left the Gwynfryn property, two cottages, and the field of Parkynol to his servant Elizabeth Owens. She chose not to live at Gwynfryn and sold it to John Lewis. He left two houses in Magazine Row to his servant James Davies. He also left large bequests to the mayor, ex-mayor and town clerk of Carmarthen, the minister of the Welsh Independent Chapel, the registrars of the Probate Registry and County Court at Carmarthen, and the manager of the London and Provincial Bank at Carmarthen. He left smaller bequests to the Royal National Lifeboat Institution, the British and Foreign Bible Society, the London Missionary Society, and the Church Missionary Society.

Jones left a large bequest to the Carmarthenshire Infirmary to be used for the erection of a ward for sick children known as the "Charles William Ward" and a large bequest to the vicar and churchwardens of St Peter's Church, Carmarthen to be used in the purchase of bread and coal to be distributed to the poor on New Year's Day each year known as the "Charles William Jones charity". He also directed his executors to erect a memorial window to his memory in St Peter's Church with the instruction of not exceeding the sum of £200 in applying for that purpose.
