= Hellmann Worldwide Logistics =

German transport and logistics company

Hellmann Worldwide Logistics SE & Co. KG

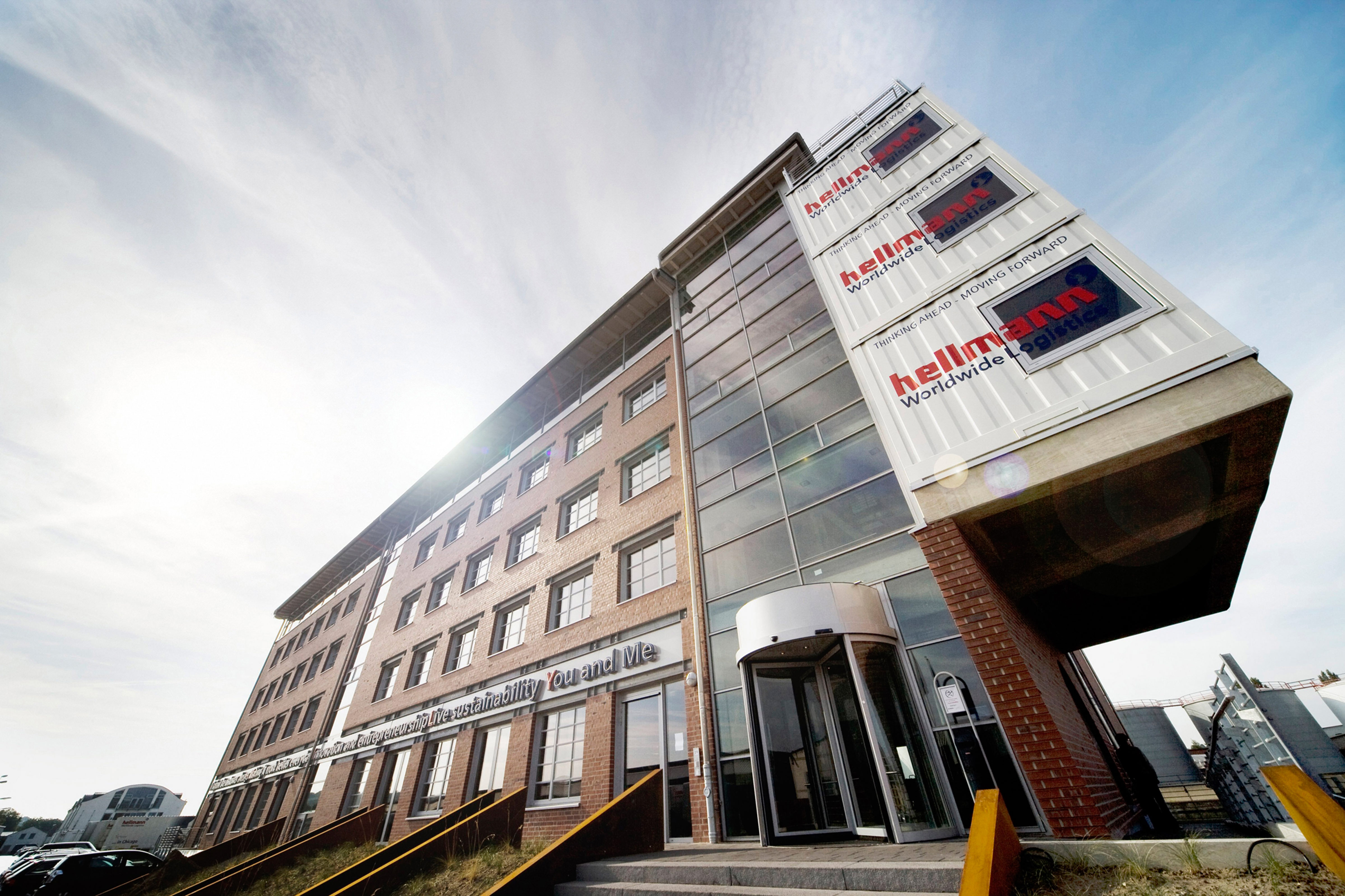
- Headquarters in Osnabrück, 2008
- Type: Private (SE & Co. KG)
- Industry: Logistics
- Founded: 1871
- Founder: Carl Heinrich Hellmann
- Headquarters: Osnabrück, Germany
- Number of locations: ▲258 (2025)
- Area served: Worldwide
- Key people: Jens Drewes (CEO); Martin Eberle (CFO); Stefan Borggreve (COO); Madhav Kurup (COO)
- Services: Airfreight; Seafreight; Roadfreight; Railfreight
- Revenue: ▼€3.7 billion (2025)
- Number of employees: ▼12,207 (2025)
- Website: www.hellmann.com

Hellmann Worldwide Logistics SE & Co. KG is a German transport and logistics company headquartered in Osnabrück, Lower Saxony, with a global presence. It has been family-owned since its foundation in 1871. Hellmann is active in airfreight, seafreight, roadfreight, railfreight, and contract logistics.

== History ==
In 1871, Carl Heinrich Hellmann founded a sole proprietorship in Osnabrück that transported goods by horse-drawn vehicles. One of the first customers was the steel mill in Georgsmarienhütte. Carl's sons Heinrich and Friedrich continued the business under Gebr. Hellmann from 1906. They passed their shares to their children and grandchildren in the following decades.

The company was almost completely destroyed during World War II and rebuilt in 1945 in Reichsbahn barracks in Osnabrück. In 1949, the first branch was opened in Hamburg, and in 1953, the second branch was added in Bremen. Hellmann was thus present at the two most important German ports.

By 1961, Hellmann had replaced the last horse-drawn wagons with modern vehicles. In 1976 and 1989, the cousins Klaus and Jost Hellmann took over the legacy of their fathers.

In 1976, Hellmann played a leading role in the founding of Deutscher Paket-Dienst (DPD). It was the first private provider to compete with the Bundespost. At the same time Hellmann accelerated internationalization and opened a branch in Hong Kong in 1982. The company has also been present in the United States since 1988. Hellmann continuously drove internationalization forward and today has 258 offices in 62 countries.

Since 1999, the company has been operating under Hellmann Worldwide Logistics. In 2018, the Hellmann family withdrew from active management of the company and handed it over to external management.

== Business activities ==
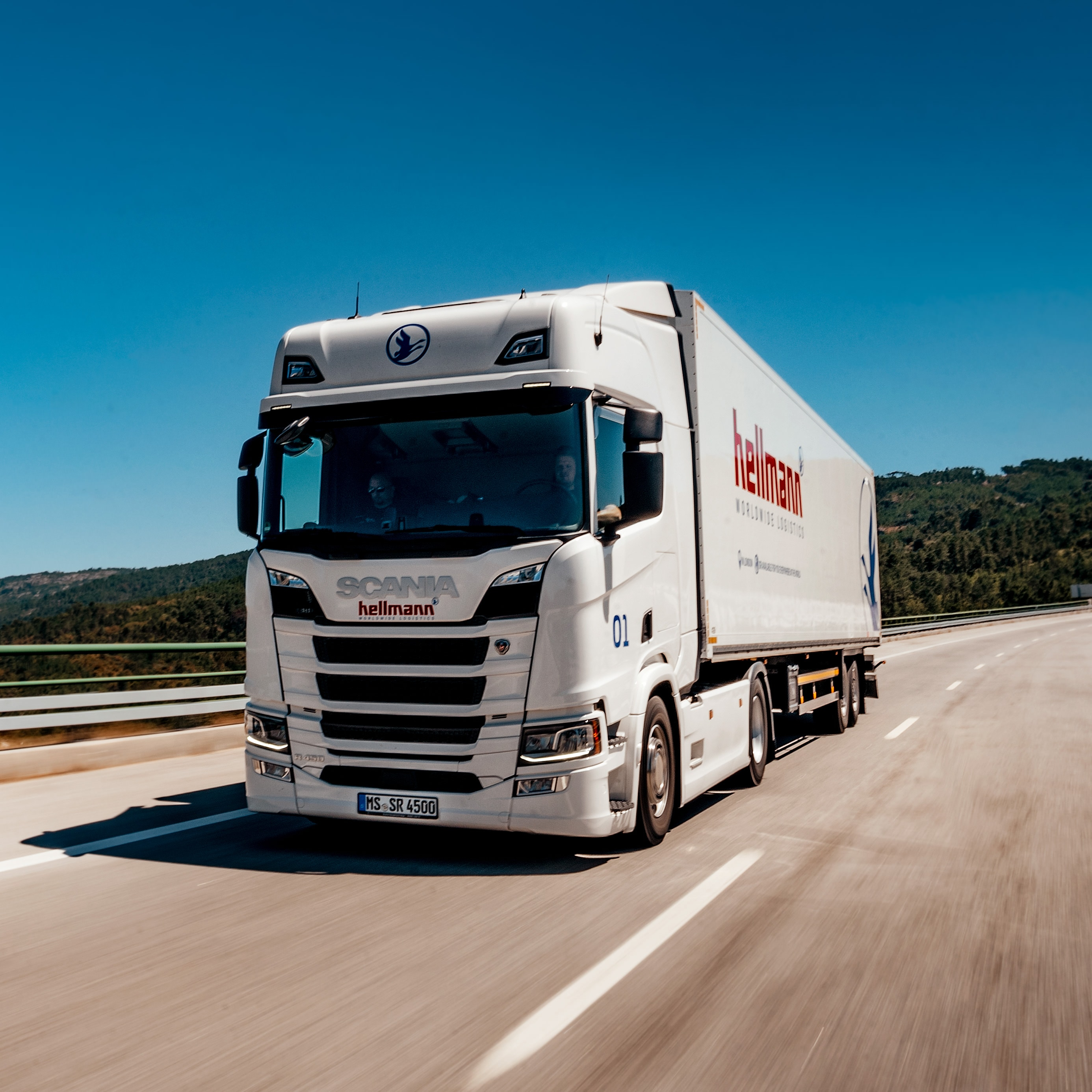
Roadfreight of Hellmann Worldwide Logistics

The company operates as a limited partnership with limited liability (SE & Co. KG). The company's management board consists of four persons. In addition, the company has a Supervisory Board, which is chaired by Thomas Lieb. Jost and Klaus Hellmann, as key shareholders, continue to be involved in strategic directions.

The company is divided into four business units: airfreight, seafreight, road and rail (overland transport), and contract logistics.

The main region for land transport is Europe. The company is a partner of System Alliance Europe. In addition to direct services, there are daily lines for general cargo transport. Recently, rail transport has developed into a growth area for the company in Europe as well as to and from Asia being shifted to rail. It established a weekly rail connection between Germany and the People's Republic of China.

== Sustainability ==
Hellmann has signed the United Nations Global Compact. The company is a Sustainable Air Freight Alliance (SAFA) member. Partial seafreight shipments are carbon neutral as standard. Hellmann also supports ecological and social initiatives.
