= Marmaduke Lloyd =

Welsh lawyer and landowner

Sir Marmaduke Lloyd (1585–c. 1651) was a Welsh lawyer and landowner, as well as a supporter of King Charles I of England during the English Civil War.

Lloyd was the son of Thomas Lloyd, a precentor at St David's Cathedral, and the nephew of Marmaduke Middleton, who was Bishop of St David's from. Having studied at Oriel College, Oxford, and Middle Temple, he qualified as a barrister in 1608. He married Mary Stedman, and the family eventually settled at Maesyfelin, near Lampeter.

Lloyd held the position of King's Attorney for the Marches from 1614, in which year he was also appointed to the Council of Wales and the Marches. Knighted in 1622, he became puisne justice of Chester in the same year, and chief justice of the Brecknock circuit in 1636. Official records suggest that he made frequent visits to Shrewsbury. In 1645 he was taken prisoner at Hereford by Parliamentary forces, and remained in custody until 1647. At the Battle of St Fagans in 1648, he was again taken prisoner. The date of his will suggests that he died in 1651.

The poet Henry Vaughan at one time served as secretary to Sir Marmaduke.

The eldest of Sir Marmaduke's three sons, Sir Francis Lloyd, also a Royalist, was a Member of Parliament before the war and regained a position of favour following the Restoration of King Charles II of England.
