= 1915 Carmarthen Boroughs by-election =

UK Parliamentary by-election in Wales

The 1915 Carmarthen Boroughs by-election was held on 17 March 1915. The by-election was held due to the incumbent Liberal MP, W. Llewelyn Williams, becoming Recorder of Cardiff. It was retained by Williams who was unopposed due to a War-time electoral pact.

== Result ==
1915 Carmarthen Boroughs by-election
Party	Candidate	Votes	%	±%
Liberal	W. Llewelyn Williams	Unopposed		
Registered electors				
Liberal hold				
