= 1912 Carmarthen District by-election =

UK Parliamentary by-election in Wales

The 1912 Carmarthen Boroughs by-election was a Parliamentary by-election held in the United Kingdom on 24 January 1912 for the Carmarthen Boroughs constituency in Wales. The constituency of Carmarthen Boroughs was centred on the boroughs of Carmarthen and Llanelli. It returned one Member of Parliament (MP) to the House of Commons of the Parliament of the United Kingdom, elected by the first past the post voting system.

== Vacancy ==
Llewelyn Williams MP

The sitting Liberal MP, W. Llewelyn Williams was appointed Recorder of Swansea, and required by the laws at the time, to seek re-election in a by-election.

== Electoral history ==
The constituency had returned Liberals at every election since 1876, apart from in 1895 when a Liberal Unionist won. At the last General election in December 1910, Williams was returned unopposed. However at the previous General Election, there was a contest;

General election January 1910: Carmarthen Boroughs
Party	Candidate	Votes	%	±%
Liberal	W. Llewelyn Williams	4,197	68.1	−0.2
Liberal Unionist	Hardinge Goulburn Giffard, 2nd Earl of Halsbury	1,965	31.9	+0.2
Majority		2,232	36.2	−0.4
Turnout		6,162	91.0	−0.2
Registered electors		6,772		
Liberal hold		Swing	-0.2	

== Candidates ==
Forty-five-year-old Llewelyn Williams was a local man having been born in the Towy Valley. He was educated at Llandovery College and Brasenose College, University of Oxford. He built a career in south Wales as a journalist before being called to the Bar from Lincoln's Inn in 1897. At the 1906 general election, he was elected Member of Parliament (MP) for Carmarthen District. Williams held the seat at both 1910 general elections. Politically, he has opposed the Boer War, was a supporter of Disestablishment of the Church in Wales and a Welsh Nationalist.

The Conservatives selected 48-year-old Henry Coulson Bond as their candidate. He was born in Berkshire and educated at Rugby School. Bond was a first time candidate.

The Labour Party chose F.G. Vivian to contest the seat. He had not fought an election before, and Labour had not contested this seat before.

== Result ==
The Liberals comfortably held the seat but with a reduced majority;

1912 Carmarthen Boroughs by-election
Party	Candidate	Votes	%	±%
Liberal	W. Llewelyn Williams	3,836	58.6	−9.5
Conservative	Henry Coulson Bond	2,555	39.1	+7.2
Independent Labour	F G Vivian	149	2.3	N/A
Majority		1,281	19.5	−16.7
Turnout		6,540	89.8	−1.2
Registered electors		7,279		
Liberal hold		Swing	-8.3	

== Aftermath ==
In February 1915, Williams was appointed Recorder of Cardiff and required to face another by-election, in which he was returned unopposed. Neither Bond nor Vivian stood for parliament again.
