= Mourning ring =

Type of finger ring

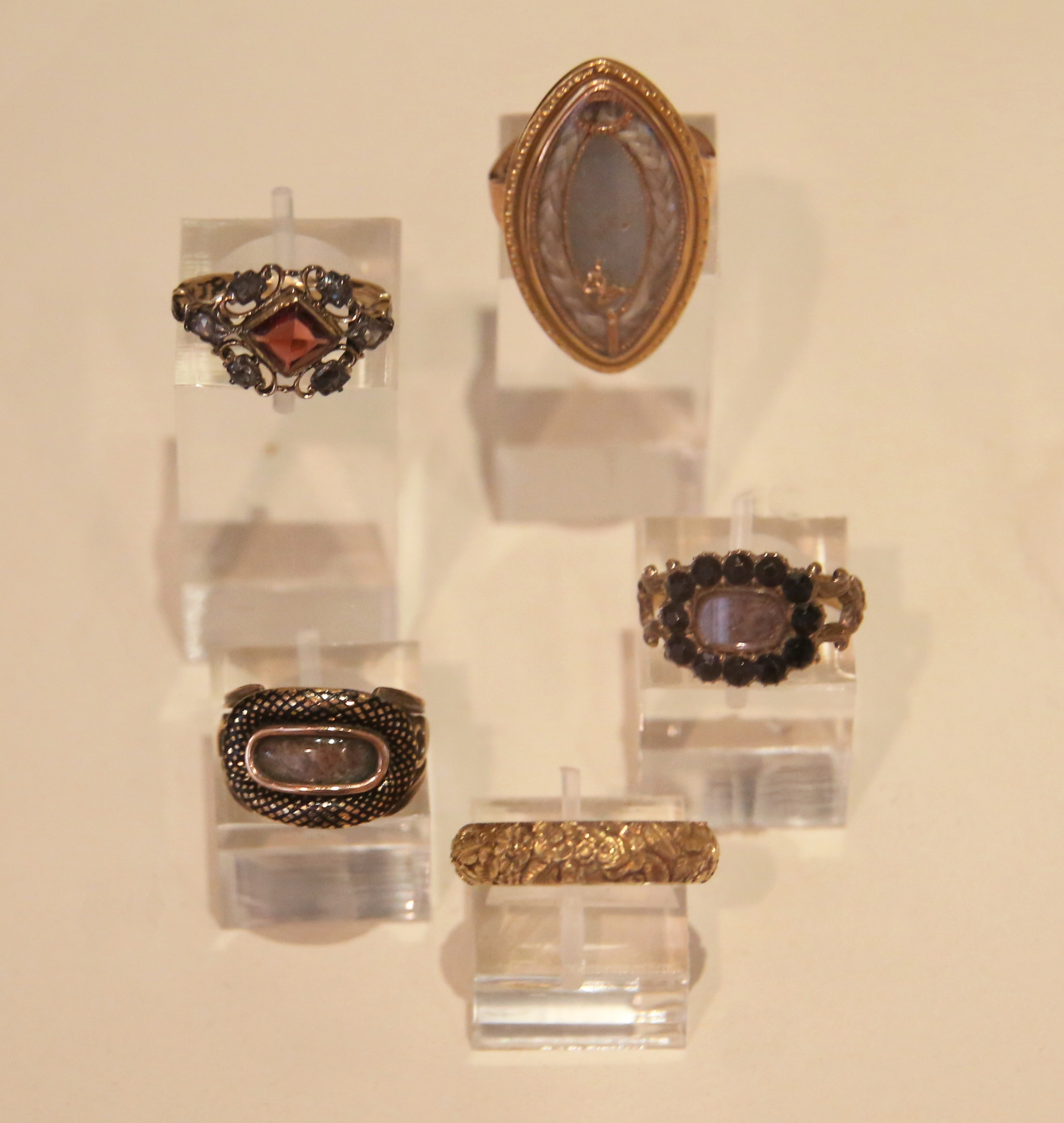
Five mourning rings made between 1745 and 1826

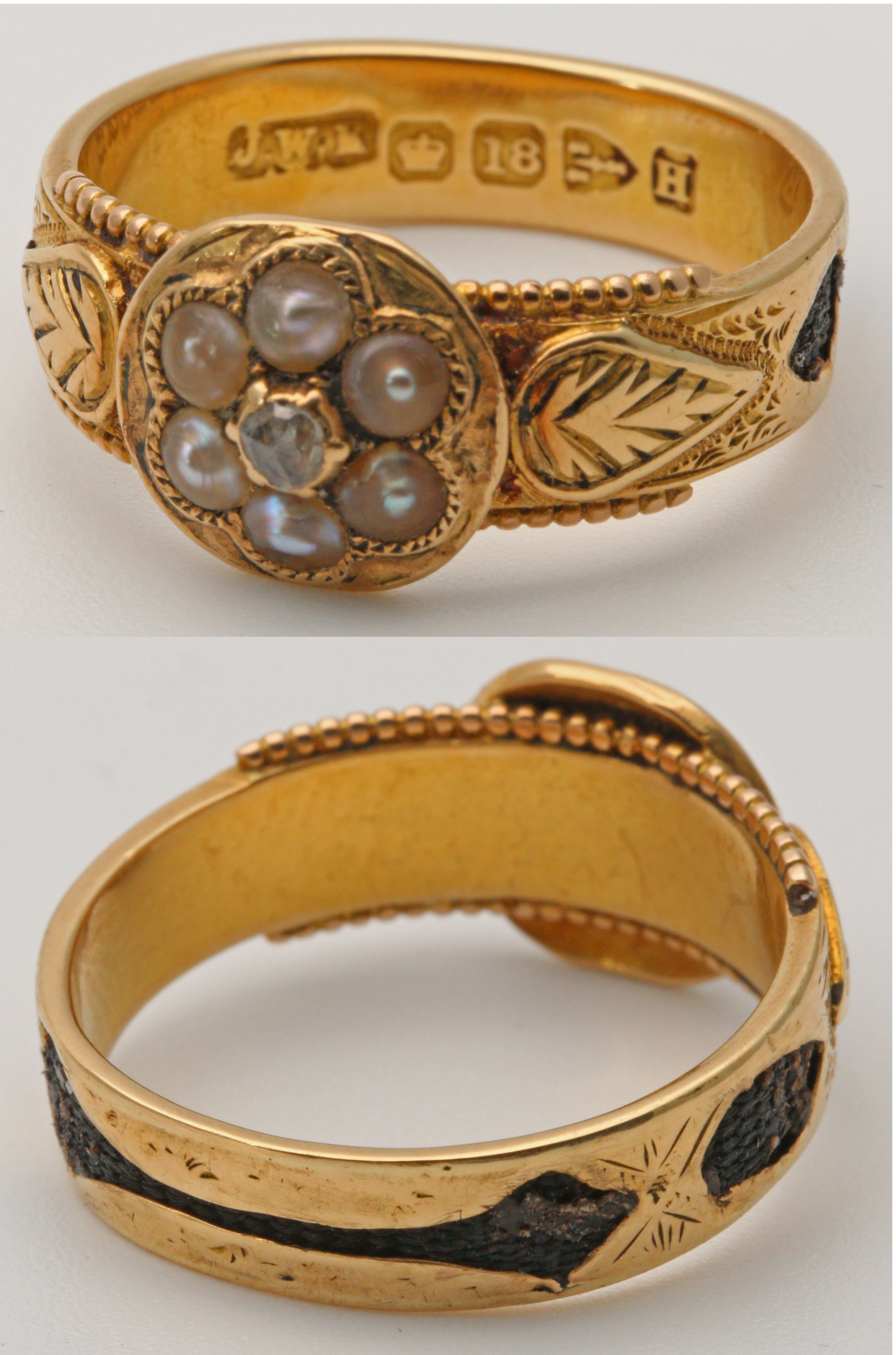
Victorian mourning ring with hair enclosed in 18ct gold

A mourning ring is a finger ring worn in memory of someone who has died. It is one subcategory of the larger group of mourning jewelry and often bears the name and date of death (and possibly an image or a motto) of a deceased individual. The name and death date are traditionally communicated through use of enamel or engraving. Rings were usually paid for by the person commemorated, or their heirs, and often specified, along with the list of intended recipients, in wills. Stones mounted on the rings were usually black, and where it could be afforded jet was the preferred option. Otherwise cheaper black materials such as black enamel or vulcanite were used. White enamel was used on occasion, particularly where the deceased was a child, or less commonly, an unmarried individual. In some cases a lock of hair of the deceased person would be incorporated into the ring. During the Victorian period, concerns arose that the hair of the deceased would be substituted with the hair of anonymous donors.

The use of mourning rings dates back to at least the 14th century, although it is only in the 17th century that they clearly separated from more general memento mori rings. By the mid-18th century jewelers had started to advertise the speed with which such rings could be made. The style largely settled upon was a single small stone with details of the decedent recorded in enamel on the hoop. Other styles included a marquis shaped face with painted funerary imagery such as urns, plinths, mourning figures, and broken pillars. This imagery often included the initials of the dead and was typically covered by a face of rock crystal.

In the latter half of the 19th century the style of mourning rings shifted towards mass-produced rings featuring a photograph mounted on the bezel. Toward the end of the century, the use of mourning rings largely ceased. The mass production of mourning rings made this jewelry more accessible to the middle class, shifting mourning rings away from its upper class origins. Some scholars argue that upon this rapid mass production, mourning rings and mourning jewelry more largely shifted to represent the capitalistic exploitation of mourning individuals.

Use of mourning rings resurfaced in the 1930s and 1940s in the United States. The rings were made of bakelite and mounted a small picture of the person being mourned.

Mourning rings have sometimes been made to mark occasions other than a person's death. In 1793 one was made for William Skirving after he was sentenced to penal transportation.

== People who bequeathed mourning rings ==
- Cesar Picton (c. 1755 – 1836), bequeathing 16 rings
- Sir Anthony Browne (1509–1567)
- Col. Nicholas Spencer (1633–1689)
- William Shakespeare (1564–1616; mourning rings mentioned in Shakespeare's will)
- Princess Amelia of the United Kingdom (1783–1810)
