= Walter Rice (MP) =

Welsh politician

Sir Walter Rice was a Welsh politician who sat in the House of Commons at various times between 1584 and 1611.

Rice was the only son of Griffith Rice of Newton, Llandefaisant who was High Sheriff of Carmarthenshire in 1567.

In 1584, he was elected Member of Parliament for Carmarthenshire. He was High Sheriff of Carmarthenshire for 1586 and served as a Deputy Lieutenant for Carmarthenshire from 1598 to 1608. In 1601 he was elected MP for Carmarthen and was knighted on 23 July 1603. In 1604 he was re-elected MP for Carmarthen.

Rice married Elizabeth, the daughter of Sir Edward Mansel of Margam. They had 4 sons and 7 daughters.

Parliament of England
Preceded by Walter Vaughan	Member of Parliament for Carmarthenshire; 1584	Succeeded by Sir Thomas Jones
Preceded by Henry Vaughan	Member of Parliament for Carmarthen; 1601–1611	Succeeded by William Thomas
