= 1882 Carmarthen Boroughs by-election =

UK Parliamentary by-election in Wales

The 1882 Carmarthen by-election was a parliamentary by-election held for the UK House of Commons constituency of Carmarthen Boroughs in West Wales on 4 January 1882.

== Vacancy ==
The by-election was caused by the appointment of the sitting Liberal MP, Benjamin Thomas Williams as a county court judge. Williams had himself been elected as MP for Carmarthen at a by-election in 1878.

== Candidates ==
The Liberals selected John Jones Jenkins, an Alderman and magistrate from Swansea, where he had been mayor three times.

== The result ==
There being no other candidates putting themselves forward Jenkins was elected unopposed.

== Result ==
1882 Carmarthen by-election
Party	Candidate	Votes	%	±%
Liberal	John Jones Jenkins	Unopposed		
Registered electors				
Liberal hold				

== See also ==
- Lists of United Kingdom by-elections
- United Kingdom by-election records
