= John Jones Jenkins, 1st Baron Glantawe =

Welsh businessman and politician

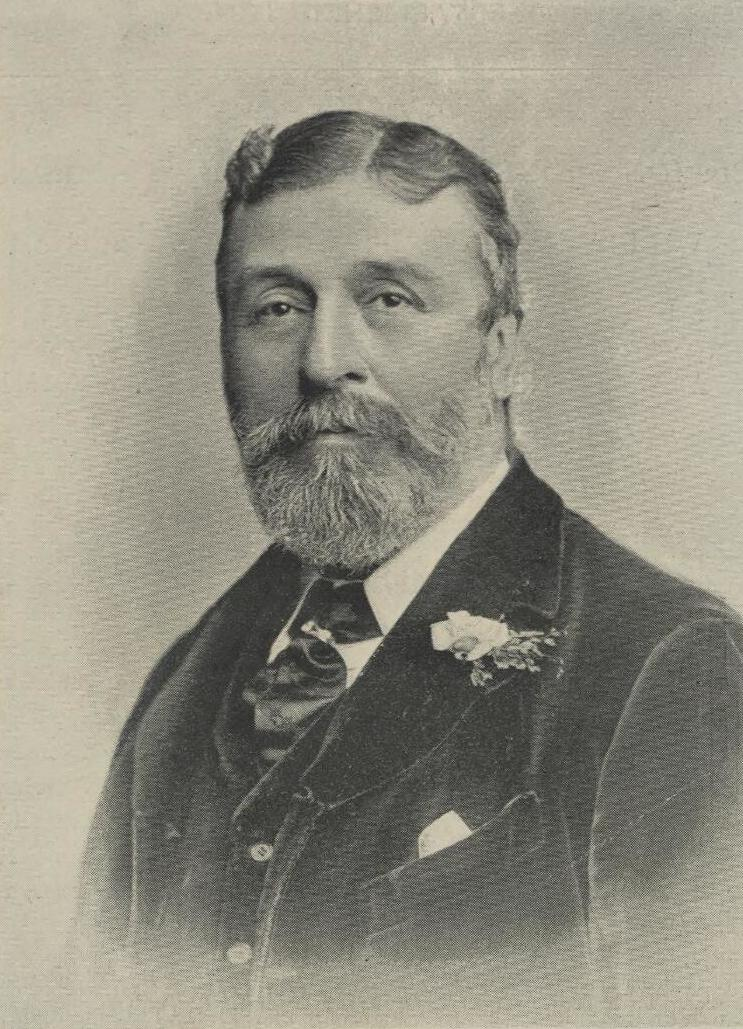
Sir John Jones Jenkins

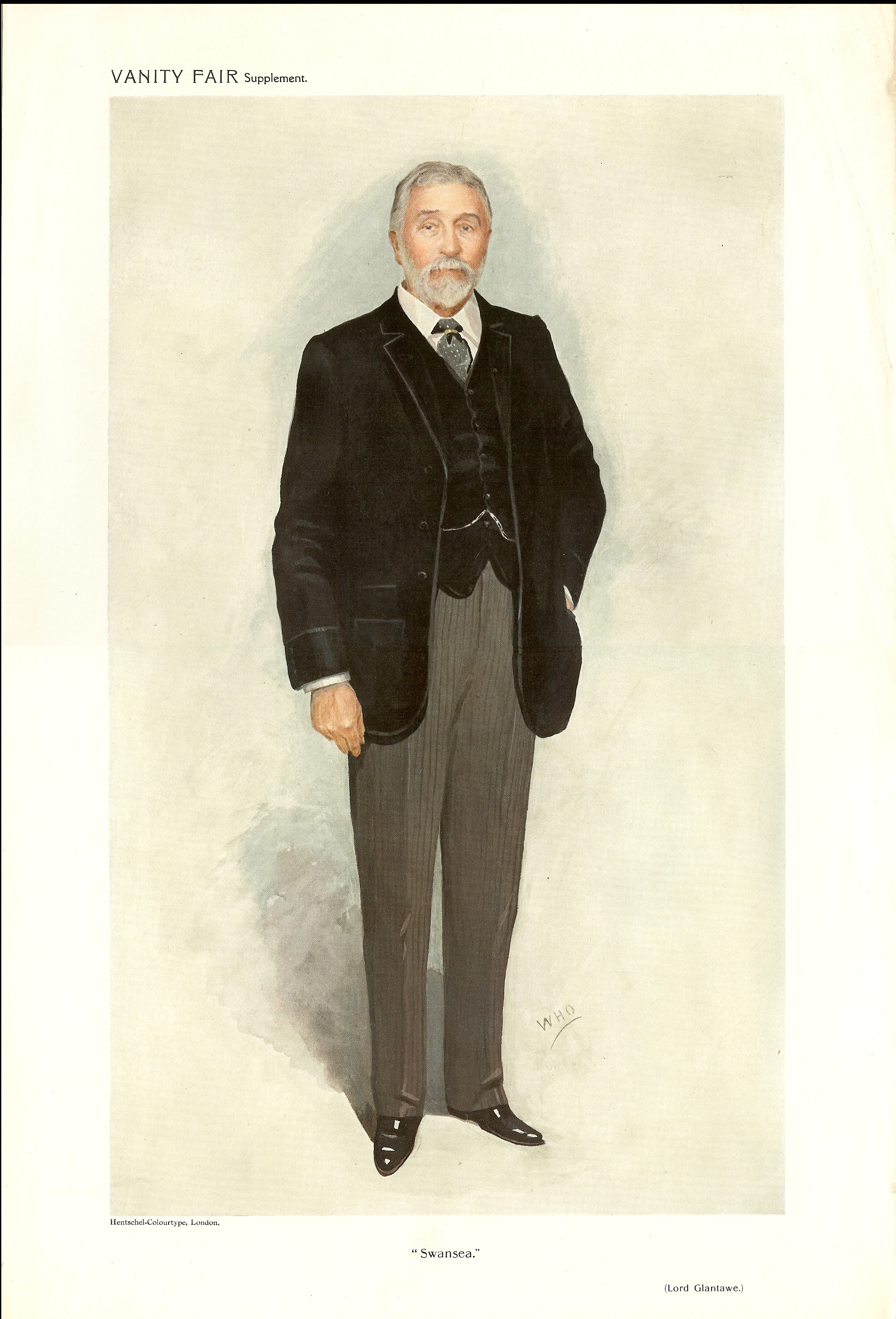
Lord Glantawe caricatured by WHO for Vanity Fair, 16 November 1910

John Jones Jenkins, 1st Baron Glantawe (10 May 1835 – 27 July 1915) was a Welsh tin-plate manufacturer and Liberal politician. Having commenced working at the Upper Forest Tinplate Works in Morriston, at the age of fifteen, he ended his life as one of the wealthiest men in Glamorgan.

== Background ==
Jenkins was the son of Jenkin Jenkins of Morriston, Glamorgan, and his wife, Sarah Jones.

== Business career ==
Jenkins was co-founder and manager of the Beaufort Tinplate Works at Morriston in 1859, where he was chief manager and partner until 1869.

== Political career ==
Jenkins was a Justice of the Peace for Swansea and Carmarthenshire and Mayor of Swansea three times, in 1869, 1879 and 1880. He was knighted on 17 May 1882. He stood unsuccessfully for parliament at Carmarthen in 1880, but was elected Member of Parliament for the constituency in a by-election in 1882.

Jenkins held the seat until 1886 when he joined the Liberal Unionist party in opposition to Home Rule for Ireland but lost against an official Liberal Party candidate. In 1889, he was High Sheriff of Glamorgan. Jenkins was invited by J. F. Morris to stand as the Liberal Unionist candidate for Carmarthen in 1895 and subsequently held the seat until 1900.

On 18 July 1906 he was raised to the peerage as Baron Glantawe, of Swansea in the County of Glamorgan.

== Personal life ==
Lord Glantawe married, firstly, Margaret Rees, daughter of Josiah Rees, on 20 January 1854. She died after 9 years of marriage. He married, secondly, Catherine Prudence Daniel, daughter of Edward Daniel, on 10 May 1864 at Llansamlet, Glamorgan. Jenkins had two daughters by his second wife—Olga Violet Jenkins, Mrs Daniell (b. 1878) and Alina Kate Elaine Jenkins, Lady Bledisloe (b. 1880) -- but had no male heir. (Alina married Lord Bledisloe in 1928 and died in 1956.)

Glantawe died, aged 80, at The Grange, West Cross in Swansea, now the site of the Territorial Army base, and was buried at Oystermouth Cemetery. The peerage died with him as he had left no male heir.

Probate to his estate was granted on 7 April 1916 in London, to Olga Violet Daniell and Alina Kate Elaine Jenkins, his daughters. Effects were listed as £66,366 13s 11d, approximately £6 million in October 2025.

== Arms ==
Coat of arms of John Jones Jenkins, Baron Glantawe
Crest A lion's gamb erect and erased Argent holding a pellet charged with a fleur de lys, all between two fleurs de lys Argent. Escutcheon Per pale Sable and Gules, on a chevron between two fleurs de lys in chief and a lion's gamb in base Argent, a fleur de lys Sable between two pellets.. Supporters On the dexter a dragon and on the sinister a goat both Or, suspended round the neck on each on a riband Sable a shield per pale of the last and Gules, thereon a fleur de lys Argent. Motto Perseverance.

Parliament of the United Kingdom
Preceded by Benjamin Thomas Williams	Member of Parliament for Carmarthen; 1882 – 1886	Succeeded by Sir Arthur Cowell-Stepney, Bt
Preceded by Evan Rowland Jones	Member of Parliament for Carmarthen; 1895 – 1900	Succeeded by Alfred Davies
Honorary titles
Preceded by	High Sheriff of Glamorgan; 1889–1890	Succeeded by
Peerage of the United Kingdom
New creation	Baron Glantawe; 1906–1915	Extinct
