= Walter Vaughan (MP for Carmarthenshire) =

Member of the Parliament of England

Walter Vaughan (died 1598), of Golden Grove, Carmarthenshire, was a Member of Parliament for Carmarthenshire in 1572 and 1593, Mayor of Carmarthen 1574, 1580 and 1597 and High Sheriff of Pembrokeshire in 1594.
