= John Morgan (fl. 1563) =

Welsh politician

John Morgan (fl. 1563) was a Welsh politician.

He was a member (MP) of the parliament of England for Carmarthen Boroughs in 1563.
