= Schölerberg =

District of Osnabrück, Lower Saxony, Germany

Coordinates: 52.2575°N 8.0639°E

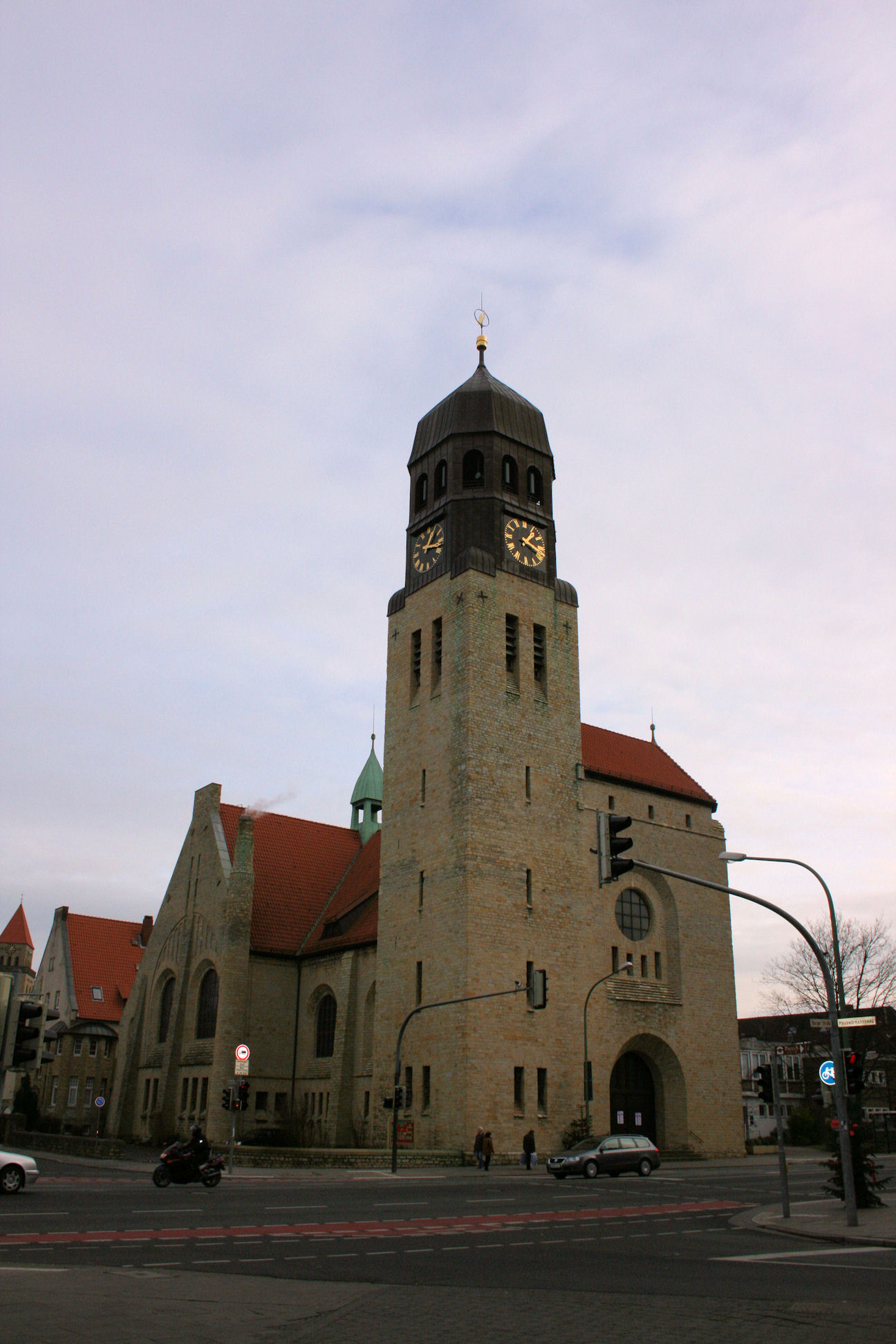
Lutherkirche (Luther Church)

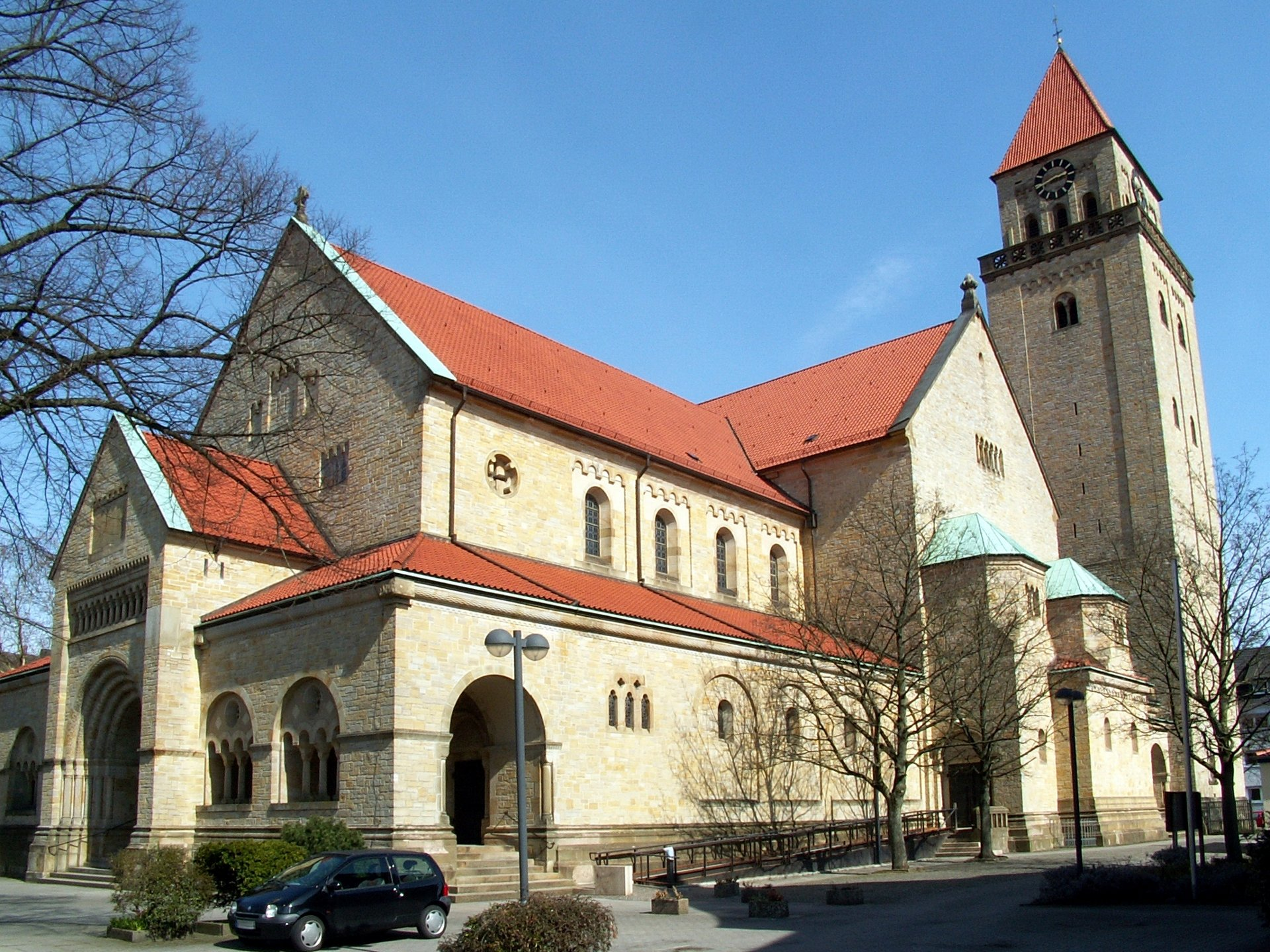
St. Joseph

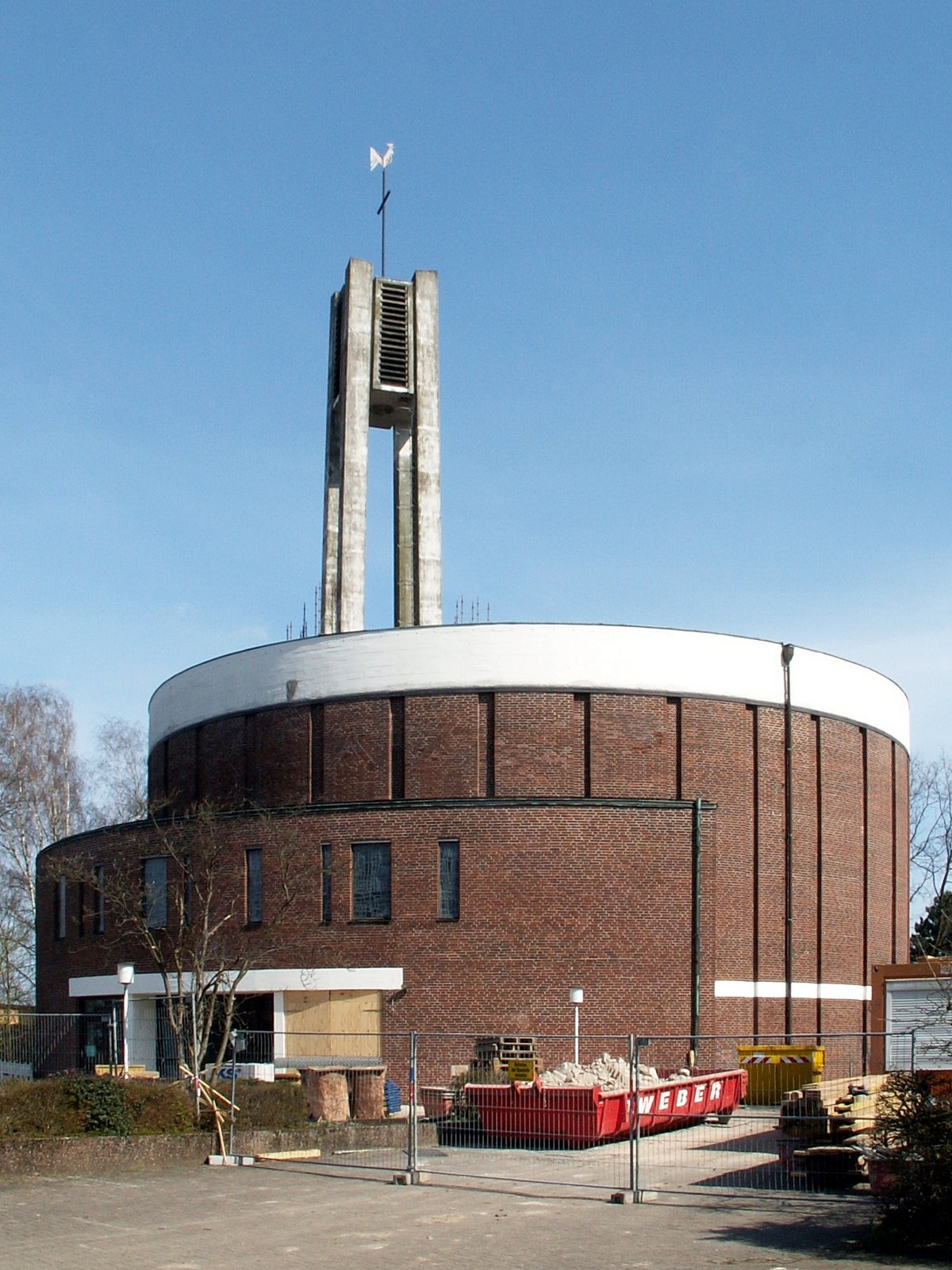
Kolumbariumskirche Heilige Familie (Holy Family Columbarium Church)

Schölerberg is a district of Osnabrück, Germany, with approximately 13,900 residents.

== Location ==
The district of Schölerberg is located in the south of Osnabrück. The only stream running through this district is the Riedenbach, flowing in a northerly direction and almost completely canalised up to a short section between the Waldpark Schölerberg (Schölerberg Forest Park) and the Vila-Real-Platz. The following districts surround Schölerberg in a clockwise direction (starting from 12 o’clock): Innenstadt, Fledder, Voxtrup, Nahne, Kalkhügel and Wüste.

== History ==
Schölerberg has been a popular local leisure area since the start of the 20th century. Numerous artifacts such as walls, steps and viewing platforms highlight the Schölerberg's former usage as a forest park. In the early 1950s the restaurants aimed at day trippers and summer toboggan run made for attractive destinations for excursions. Quite early on the Schölerberg was connected to the Osnabrück tramway network; tram line number two ran from the terminus station “Schölerberg” along Iburger Straße to Haste via Lutherkirche, Johannistor (Rosenplatz), Neumarkt, Nikolaiort and Hasetor.

== Religion ==
The area's largest churches are the Lutheran Lutherkirche (Luther Church) – built in 1909 and retaining all its Jugendstil furnishings – the Lutheran Lukaskirche (Luke Church) and the Catholic Kirche St. Joseph (St. Joseph's Church), which was consecrated in 1917. The former Heilige Familie (Holy Family) Catholic parish church was converted into a columbarium church from 2009 to 2011. Furthermore, the parish hall of the Reformed Evangelical Friedenskirche (Church of Peace) is located in the district; currently it is used as a youth church.

In addition the district of Schölerberg is home to four Muslim places of worship (the Ditib, Aya-Sofia and Merkez mosques as well as one other).

== Culture and places of interest ==
The Stadtpark Schölerberg (Schölerberg City Park) is situated on a limestone ridge (126m tall, with the same name and part of Osnabrück's mountainous region) and is home to a wide variety of natural species. Along with maple and beech trees there are also oaks, ashes, cherry trees and robinia present. Typical spring bloomers can also be found on the Schölerberg such as anemones, celandine, spotted arum and melic grass.

The special location of the Schölerberg is also utilised by the nationally acclaimed Osnabrücker Zoo which is situated in this area. After the opening of the Samburu Park, the Underirdische Zoo (Underground Zoo) was opened at the start of 2009, connecting the zoo to the neighbouring Natural History Museum (also known as the “Museum am Schölerberg"). A planetarium and the Bodenpark Expo Project are situated in the immediate vicinity of the zoological gardens.

== Sport ==
Two traditional sport clubs – SC Schölerberg and SV Eintracht 08 Osnabrück – are located in the Schölerberg district, alongside football offering numerous other sports such as aerobics, badminton, basketball, women's gymnastics, light athletics, sport shooting, tae-kwon-do, table tennis and regular tennis.

The flagship sport club of the area, however – known well beyond the boundaries of Osnabrück – is the Judo Crocodiles Osnabrück. Founded in 1980 by Jürgen Füchtmeyer, it continues to produce judoka of national and international acclaim – among them Julia Matijass, bronze medal winner at the 2004 Olympics, Oliver Gussenberg – participant in the 2000 and 2004 games – and most recently Martin Matijass, bronze medal winner at the European Under-17s Championships. The Crocodiles have also scored successes in team judo – such as their 6 championship triumphs in the women's First Bundesliga and, in 2012, victory at the male German Under-17s Team Championship. The sports centre on Iburger Straße offers more than just judo, however – the ju-jitsu department is also becoming more popular and, following on from gold and silver wins in German championships, had a runner-up European Champion in Axel Walter in 2013. The training centre with its 600m² judo hall is a mecca for judoka across the whole Osnabrück region and its pull extends deep into North Rhine-Westphalia. However, fitness and sports rehabilitation can also be practiced in the 500m² fitness room.

== Links ==
- Vierteljährliche Informationen des Referates Stadtentwicklung und Bürgerbeteiligung, Bereich Statistik, 4/2008 (Quarterly information from the Referat Stadtentwicklung und Bürgerbeteiligung (Department for Urban Development and Citizen Participation), Statistics department, 4/2008 (PDF file, 1.49 MB, in German))
- Stadt Osnabrück, Referat für Stadtentwicklung und Bürgerbeteiligung -Statistik-, 11/2009 (City of Osnabrück, Referat für Stadtentwicklung und Bürgerbeteiligung – Statistics -, 11/2009 (PDF file, 35.40 KB, in German))
