= Francis Lloyd (Royalist) =

Welsh politician

Sir Francis Lloyd (died 1669) was a Welsh politician who sat in the House of Commons from 1640 to 1644. He fought in the Royalist army in the English Civil War.

Lloyd was the son of Sir Marmaduke Lloyd of Maesyfelin, Cardiganshire. In April 1640, Lloyd was elected Member of Parliament for Carmarthen in the Short Parliament. He was re-elected MP for Carmarthen for the Long Parliament in November 1640. Lloyd was Comptroller of the Household to King Charles I and was knighted at Oxford on 24 March 1643. He was disabled from sitting in parliament on 5 February 1644. In 1644 he was commander in chief of the horse for the King in Pembrokeshire until he was routed at Haverfordwest. He was taken prisoner at Hereford on 18 December 1645. He compounded for his estates on 24 January 1646.

After the Restoration, Lloyd was appointed Gentleman of the Privy Chamber to King Charles II.

Lloyd married firstly Mary Earl, daughter of John Earl of Carbery, and secondly Bridget Leigh daughter of Richard Leigh of Carmarthen.

Parliament of England
Vacant Parliament suspended since 1629	Member of Parliament for Carmarthen; 1640–1644	Succeeded by William Davids
