= Alfred Davies (Carmarthen MP) =

British politician (1848–1907)

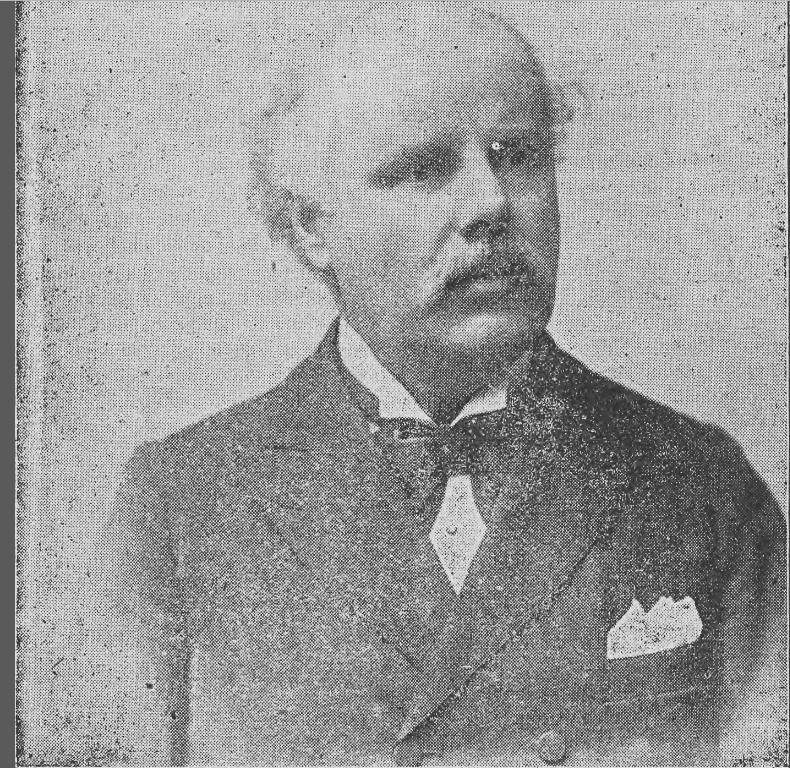
Davies in 1910

Alfred Davies (14 October 1848 – 27 September 1907) was a British Liberal Party politician and businessman. Davies founded the British freight forwarding company Davies Turner in 1870 which claimed in 2013 to be the largest independent freight forwarding company operating in Great Britain.

== Early life ==
Davies was born on 14 October 1848, the fourth son of Rev. John Davies, a Welsh Congregational Minister in London. His father was a farmer's son from Penygraig, Carmarthenshire, who had commenced preaching at sixteen, and progressed from Carmarthen Grammar School and the nonconformist Academy at Newport Pagnall to be the minister of Albany Chapel, Regent's Park, and Marsh- street, Walthamstow. His mother, Mary Kidman Foster, belonged to a prominent nonconformist family in Cambridgeshire. He was educated at Mill Hill School and at Rickmansworth. He married in 1877, Lydia Edith Death of Burnt Mill, Essex.

== Career ==
At the age of seventeen, Davies left school and began working in the offices of a steamship company. Within a few years he had started in business on his own account and proved very successful. He was founder and Chairman of Directors of Davies, Turner & Co., Ltd, London, Liverpool, and elsewhere. He was also President of Davies, Turner & Co., of New York, Boston, and Philadelphia, underwriters and international carriers.

== Early political career ==
Davies was a Progressive party member of the London County Council from 1889 to 1892, representing Hackney North. He earned a reputation as a social reformer, and at his own expense prosecuted a number of owners of unsanitary cellar dwellings. In 1890, Davies was nominated to be Liberal candidate for the vacancy in East Carmarthenshire following the death of David Pugh but he withdrew before the selection conference.

== Member for Carmarthen Boroughs ==
In 1899, Davies was selected as Liberal candidate for Carmarthen Boroughs, a constituency then held by the Liberal Unionist, Sir John Jones Jenkins. Davies defeated Jenkins at the 1900 General Election and sat as Liberal MP for the constituency until 1906.

General election 1900 Carmarthen District of Boroughs Electorate 5,557
| Party | Candidate | Votes | % | ±% |
|---|---|---|---|---|
| Liberal | Alfred Davies | 2,837 | 58.1 | |
| Liberal Unionist | John Jones Jenkins | 2,047 | 41.9 | |
| Majority | | 790 | 16.2 | |
| Turnout | | | 87.9 | |
| Liberal gain from Liberal Unionist | | Swing | | |

Davies's time as member for the boroughs was eventful and a crisis arose over his differences with Lloyd George over the South African War. In 1903, when a general election seemed imminent, some leading members of the Liberal association sought to remove Davies as candidate, with Tom Terrell and the former member for the constituency, Major E.R. Jones, being invited to address meetings. Davies refused to participate in the selection process and this led to split in the ranks of the Liberal Association.

Davies retired at the general election of January 1906. He did not stand for parliament again.

== Sources ==
- Who Was Who
- British parliamentary election results 1885–1918, Craig, F. W. S.

Parliament of the United Kingdom
| Preceded by Sir John Jones Jenkins | Member of Parliament for Carmarthen; 1900–January 1906 | Succeeded by W. Llewelyn Williams |
