= John Vaughan (died 1574) =

Member of the Parliament of England

John Vaughan (born 1525, died 1574) was a Welsh politician.

He was the eldest son of Hugh Vaughan of Kidwelly.

He was Mayor of Carmarthen in 1554–1555 and 1563–1564, and an alderman in 1555. He was a justice of the peace for Carmarthenshire from 1559 until his death and was appointed High Sheriff of Carmarthenshire for 1562–1563. He was elected a Member (MP) of the Parliament of England for Carmarthen Boroughs in 1558 and 1571, and Carmarthenshire in 1572.

He married Catherine, the daughter of Henry Morgan of Muddlescwm, with whom he had two sons, Henry and Walter, and one daughter.
