= Carmarthen Borough Council =

Former borough of Carmarthenshire, Wales

- Municipal Borough
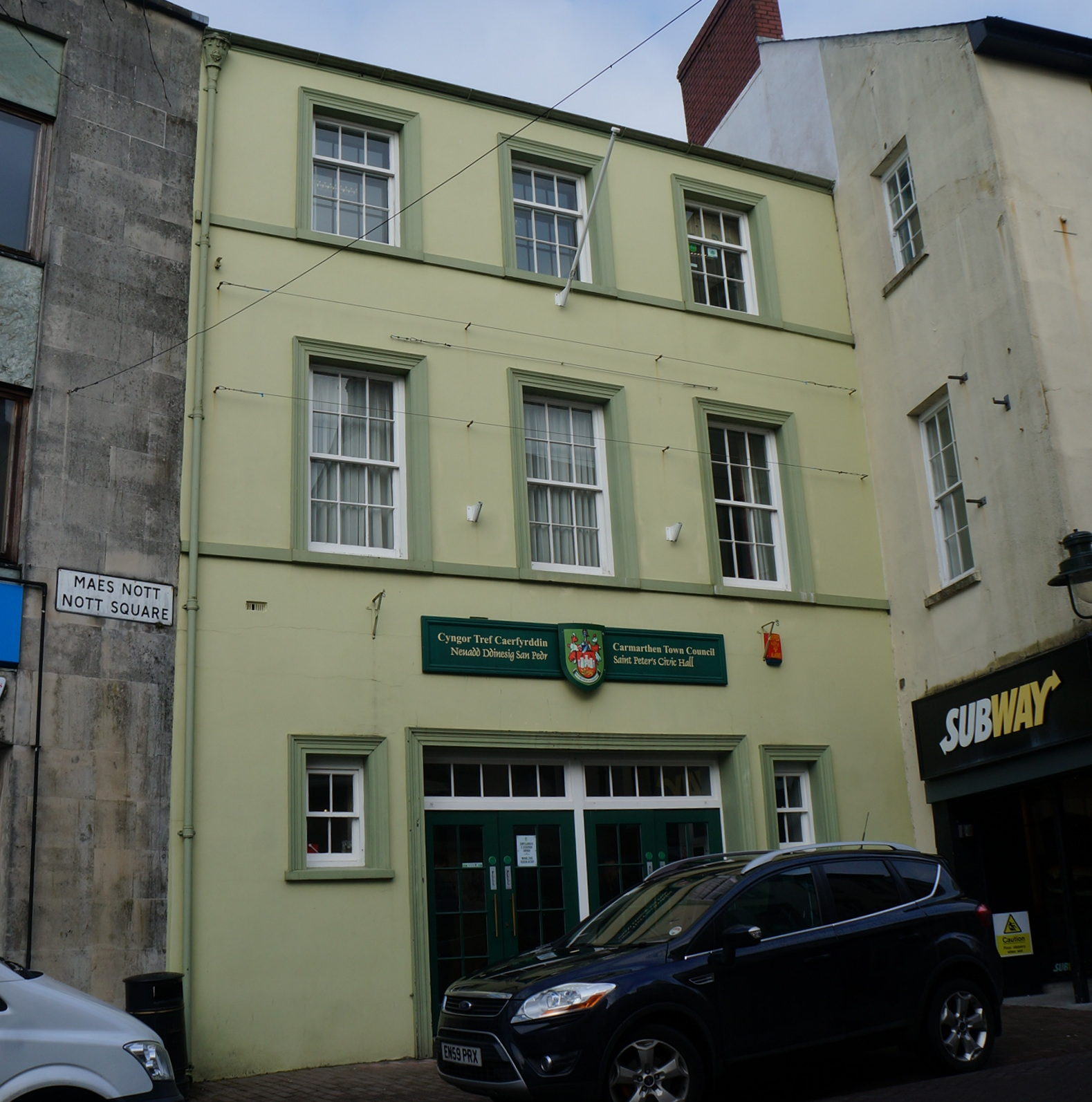
- St Peter's Church House, Carmarthen Town
- Area
  - Coordinates: 51.856°N 4.316°E
- History
  - Preceded by: Mayor, Burgesses, and Commonalty of the Borough of Carmarthen
  - Origin: Municipal Corporations Act 1835
  - Created: 1832
  - Abolished: 1972
  - Succeeded by: Carmarthen District Council, Carmarthen Town Council
- Status: Municipal Borough
- Government
  - HQ: St Peter's Church House
  - Motto: Rhyddid Hedd A Llwyddiant
- Contained within
  - County: Carmarthenshire County Council, 1889-1974
- Subdivisions
  - Type: Wards

Carmarthen Borough Council was a local authority in the central part of Carmarthenshire, Wales, created in 1835 under the Municipal Corporations Act 1835. It succeeded the Mayor, Burgesses, and Commonalty of the Borough of Carmarthen established by a Royal Charter of 1604.

The authority covered the electoral wards of Carmarthen Town North, Carmarthen Town South, and Carmarthen Town West.

The authority was abolished following local government reorganisation in 1974, and its role taken on by Carmarthen District Council. The ceremonial and community council functions were taken on by Carmarthen Town Council.

== Elections ==
=== Elections ===
The council consisted of a toral of 24 members. Eighteen elected members were elected for three years, and a further six aldermen, who were elected for a six year term by the council itself.

A third of the council was elected annually.

=== Mayor ===
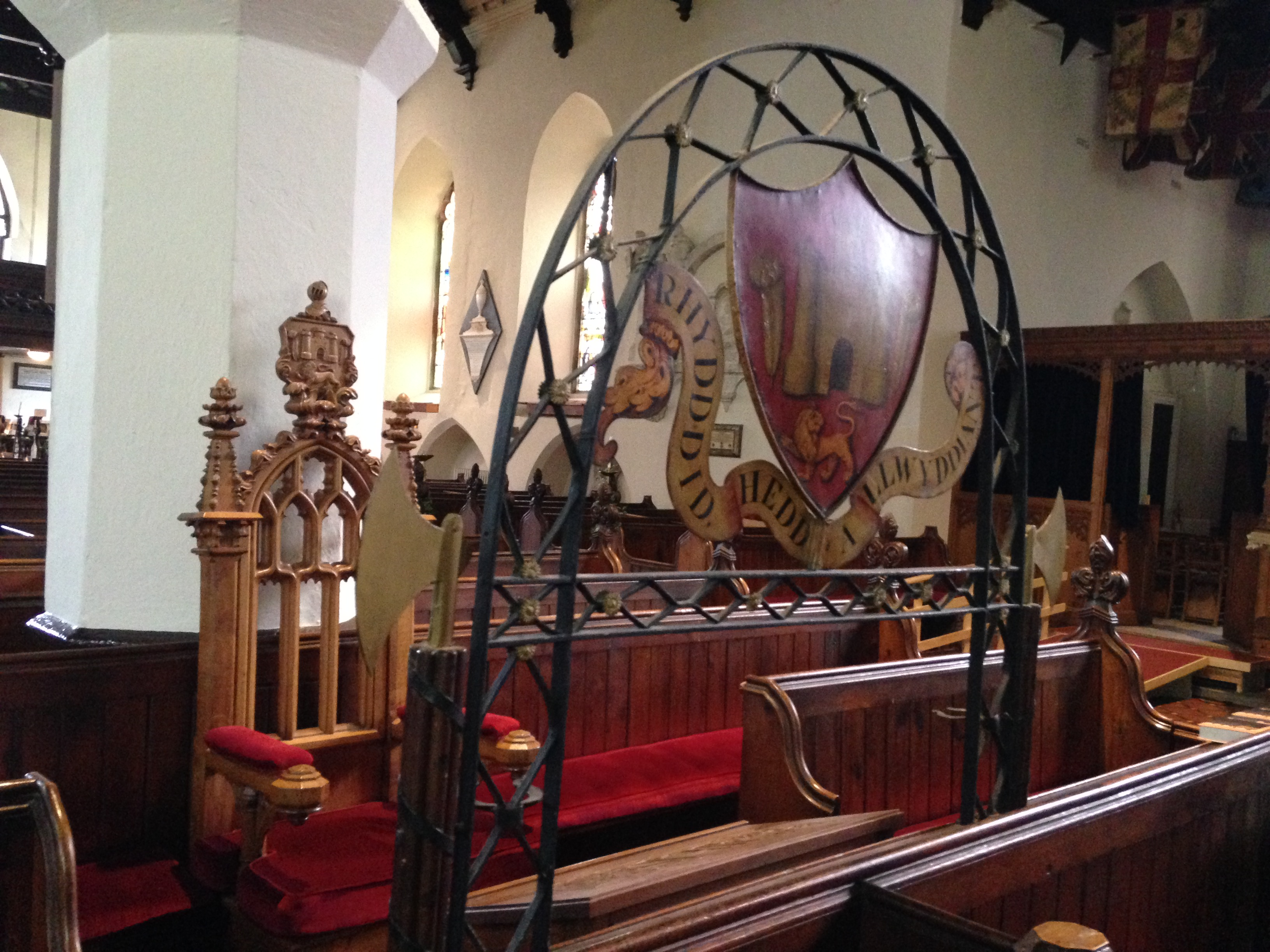
Mayor's chair in St Peter's Church, Carmarthen

- 1835 David Davies
- 1836 Capt John George Phillips
- 1837–1838 Thomas Morris
- 1839 William Phillips
- 1840 Charles Jones
- 1841 Thomas Taylor Webb
- 1842 William Morris
- 1843 Edmond Hills Stacey
- 1844 William Morris
- 1845 George Davies
- 1846 Thomas Charles Morris
- 1847 Samuel Tardrew
- 1848 William George Thomas
- 1849 John Lewis
- 1850–1851 Valentine Davies
- 1852–1853 William Morris
- 1854–1855 Lewis Morris
- 1856 Thomas Charles Morris
- 1857 John Lewis Phillips
- 1858 James Rowlands
- 1859 Henry Norton
- 1860–1861 John Thomas
- 1862–1863 Wm de Grunchy Warren
- 1864 Valentine Davies
- 1865 John Adams
- 1866 Robert Brodie
- 1867 E. D. Bowen Jones
- 1868 David Davies
- 1869–1870 John Lewis
- 1871 Henry Norton
- 1872 John Thomas
- 1873 Wm de Grunchy Warren
- 1874 David Lewis
- 1875 David M. Morgan
- 1876 David Bonnell Edwards
- 1877 Thomas Mostyn Davies
- 1878 Thomas Thomas
- 1879 Richard William Richards
- 1880 Charles William Jones
- 1881 John Morris
- 1882–1884 James Jenkyn Jones
- 1885 John Lewis
- 1886 Thomas Mostyn Davies
- 1887 William Richard Edwards
- 1888 Edward Alfred Rogers
- 1889 Howell Howells
- 1890 Thomas Davies
- 1891–1892 Thomas Jenkins
- 1893 James Davies
- 1894 Henry Cadle
- 1895–1898 Henry Brunel White
- 1899 John Lewis
- 1900 Walter Spurell
- 1901–1902 Edward Colby Evans
- 1903 Walter Spurell
- 1904–1905 Edward Alfred Rogers
- 1906 Henry Evan Blagdon Richards
- 1907 Joseph Nicholas Williams (16 November 1906)
- 1908 John Lewis
- 1909 John Crossman
- 1910 Walter Lloyd
- 1911 William Thomas
- 1912–1913 John Beynon Arthur
- 1914–1917 John Lewis
- 1918–1919 Alderman William Evans
- 1920–1921 Andrew Fuller Mills
- 1922 Lewis David Thomas
- 1923 John Richards
- 1924 Andrew Fuller Mills
- 1925 John Hinds
- 1926 Andrew Fuller Mills
- 1927 Walter Spurell
- 1928–1929 David John Davies
- 1930–1932 William Jones
- 1933–1935 Thomas Lloyd
- 1936–1937 John Owen Morgans
- 1938–1941 James Islwyn Davies
- 1942–1944 Philip William Trefor Thomas
- 1945 John Russell
- 1945 Lewis Jones
- 1946–1947 John Jenkins
- 1948–1950 Enoch Davies
- 1950–1952 William David Jones
- 1952–1954 Charles Wright Griffiths
- 1954–1956 John James Lewis
- 1956–1958 Clifford Caron Jones
- 1958–1959 T. J. Thomas (Died in Office)
- 1959–1961 M. E. Clifford Jones
- 1961 (May to Sept) Mrs A. K. White (Died in Office)
- 1961–1963 T. Idwal Jones
- 1963–1964 Alderman Ellis J. Powell
- 1964–1965 Sidney Jeremy
- 1965–1966 D. D. Harries
- 1966–1967 William Wynford Francis Davies
- 1967–1968 Charles Wright Griffiths
- 1968 Leslie Hyde Howells
- 1969 David Jones Howells
- 1970 William Colvin
- 1971 Ronald Byles Evans
- 1972 Lawrence Victor Rice
- 1973 William Roy Nicholl
