= James Phillips (MP) =

British Member of Parliament

James Phillips (1672–1730) was a Welsh politician who sat in the House of Commons from 1725 to 1727.

Phillips was baptized on 11 July 1672, the eldest son of John Phillips, alderman of Carmarthen and his wife Anne Newsham, daughter of Thomas Newsham. He married Jane Scurlock, daughter of John Scurlock of Pibwr before 1700.

Phillips was Mayor of Carmarthen in 1709. He was returned, as Tory Member of Parliament for Carmarthen, at a by-election on 4 January 1725. At the 1727 general election, he was defeated by a Whig. He petitioned, but was unsuccessful.

Phillips succeeded his father on 11 August 1730, but died himself two months later on 28 November 1730. He had one son and two daughters.

Parliament of Great Britain
Preceded by Richard Vaughan	Member of Parliament for Carmarthen; 1725–1727	Succeeded by Arthur Bevan
