= System Alliance Europe =

System Alliance Europe eG is a cooperative of medium-sized freight forwarders. SAE operates as a neutral, non-corporate alliance focused on general cargo transport and collaborative logistics solutions.

== History ==
Since its foundation on 7 June 2005 with 16 partners in 5 countries, the cooperative has expanded. As of 2025, the network consisted of 56 partners, with 180 branches across 32 European countries. In 2022, the network transported 3.1 million consignments and 0.98 million Tonnage. The network partners employed 76,779 people in 2015.

As of 2025 SAE comprises 56 partner companies operating in 32 European countries, making it one of the largest collaborative networks for general cargo transport in Europe. Through this network, SAE enables seamless procurement and distribution logistics with consistent quality standards and full supply chain transparency.

The network offers:

· Unified digital systems for shipment tracking and process automation.

· Access to a powerful European distribution structure.

· Standardized products and services across all member countries.

· Streamlined internationalization for regional logistics providers.

· Cross-border transports throughout Europe via SAE partners.
