= W. Llewelyn Williams =

Welsh journalist, lawyer and politician

Llewelyn Williams
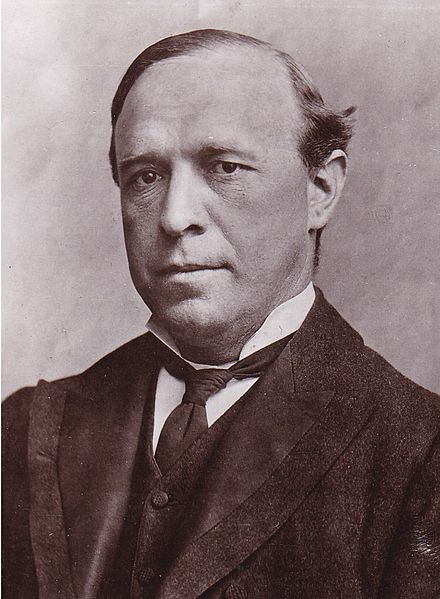

Member of Parliament for Carmarthen Boroughs
- In office 8 February 1906 – 14 December 1918
- Preceded by: Alfred Davies
- Succeeded by: Constituency abolished

Personal details
- Born: William Llewelyn Williams; 10 March 1867 Brownhill, Carmarthenshire, UK
- Died: 22 April 1922 (aged 55)
- Party: Liberal
- Parents: Morgan Williams (father); Sarah Davies (mother)
- Education: Llandovery College; Brasenose College, Oxford
- Occupation: Journalist & Lawyer

William Llewelyn Williams known as Llewelyn Williams (10 March 1867 – 22 April 1922), was a Welsh journalist, lawyer and radical Liberal Party politician.

== Early life and career ==
He was born at Brownhill, Llansadwrn, Towy Valley, Carmarthenshire, the second son of Morgan Williams and his wife Sarah (née Davies). A memorial plaque was erected in front of the house in 1938.

Born into a prosperous Congregationalist family, his grandfather Morgan Williams had been an elder at Capel Issac near Llandeilo, before moving from Ffrwd-wen to his new residence at Brownhill. His uncle, John Williams (1819–69) was an Independent minister at Llangadog and later at Newcastle Emlyn and Capel Iwan. Another uncle, Benjamin Williams (1830–86) was also an Independent minister, serving at Gwernllwyn, Dowlais; Denbigh; and Canaan, Swansea.

Williams was educated at Llandovery College and Brasenose College, Oxford. At Oxford, with O. M. Edwards, John Morris-Jones, Edward Anwyl, John Puleston Jones and Daniel Lleufer Thomas, he was one of the founder members of the Dafydd ap Gwilym Society, a Welsh-speaking student society which is named after the Welsh poet Dafydd ap Gwilym. Members of the Society saw themselves as agents of a cultural awakening, although it remained strictly non-political.

While a student at Oxford, he participated in the vigorous debates which took place in his home constituency of East Carmarthenshire to choose a Liberal candidate for the 1890 by-election following the death of David Pugh.

Both at Llandovery and Oxford, Williams came under Anglican influence and after leaving Oxford he was invited by a Welsh bishop to become a clergyman. However, his strong Congregationalist background proved too strong.

== Journalism and the law ==
Williams became involved in the Cymru Fydd movement, which emerged in the late 1880s, largely inspired by Tom Ellis. Cymru Fydd was largely a cultural and educational movement, but it differed from the sectarian tradition represented by Thomas Gee and was similar in many ways to the cultural nationalism which emerged at the time in central and eastern Europe. Williams, as late as 1894, warned against emulating the Irish Nationalist Party. The movement was largely based on support in North Wales and there were branches in London and Liverpool before Williams set up the first branch of Cymru Fydd in South Wales, at Barry, in 1891. He was later appointed the movement's South Wales Organiser by David Lloyd George.

On his return to Wales, he became a journalist, and this is how he first gained prominence in Liberal circles. Williams edited the South Wales Star at Barry, then the South Wales Post at Swansea. In 1894 he was appointed sub-editor of the South Wales Daily News, the main Liberal-supporting daily newspaper in South Wales. In April of that year, Williams gave evidence to the Welsh Land Commission when it sat at Carmarthen. He claimed that landowners had sought to discourage tenant farmers from submitting evidence. The Commission reported two years later and proposed establishing a Land Court to defend the rights of Welsh tenant farmers.

Williams believed that the so-called tithe war in Wales made disestablishment of the Anglican church in Wales a practical possibility, although Kenneth Morgan believes that he exaggerated this.

In 1895 he became a sub-editor on the London Star. By this time he had put his name forward for several Parliamentary seats. In January 1895 he participated in a number of public meetings while seeking to succeed William Williams as member for Swansea District. Speaking at Penuel Chapel, Loughor, he concentrated on Home Rule and disestablishment. He was also mentioned as a possible candidate for Cardiganshire in 1895, when he lost out to Matthew Lewis Vaughan Davies.

From journalism, Williams turned to the law, being called to the Bar from Lincoln's Inn in 1897. He took silk in 1912 and led the South Wales Circuit. He was Recorder of Swansea 1912–1915 and Recorder of Cardiff 1915–1922.

In 1899. he joined Lloyd George on a tour of Canada.

Additionally, he was heavily involved in the struggle to secure the Disestablishment of the Church in Wales, and it was on nationalistic grounds rather than on the ground of religious liberationism that he supported the disestablishment and disendowment of the Established Church in Wales. In 1919 he was one of a diminishing number of hard-line supporters of disestablishment who opposed the partial re-endowment of the Church in Wales which was effected by the Welsh Church (Temporalities) Act 1919.

By 1903, however, Williams had come to the view that a Land Court would merely perpetuate the dependent status of Welsh farmers as tenants of landed estates. He was therefore instrumental in engineering a shift in Welsh Liberal policy towards favouring the right of tenants to purchase their holdings.

In 1905, Williams made public criticisms of the University of Wales, claiming that it was an elitist body paying too little attention to the needs of Wales.

== Political career ==
=== MP for Carmarthen Boroughs ===
A renewed opportunity for election to the House of Commons arose in 1905 as a result of dissatisfaction in the Carmarthen Boroughs constituency with the sitting member, Alfred Davies. Williams emerged as a candidate favoured by the more radical faction and by May 1905 nonconformist ministers in Llanelli were proposing a plebiscite between the two rival candidates over who should contest the seat.

In due course Williams prevailed and at the 1906 general election, he was elected Member of Parliament (MP) for the constituency

=== Parliamentary career ===
A convinced new Liberal who supported the social reforms of the Liberal government of 1906–14, Williams was opposed to Socialism.

Having opposed the Boer War, Llewelyn Williams only reluctantly supported the Great War after the German attack on Belgium. He opposed Liberal Prime Minister H. H. Asquith over conscription in 1916, supporting the rights of conscientious objectors and opposing the Defence of the Realm Act. However, when Lloyd George took over as prime minister, Williams sided with Asquith. Williams held his seat until it was abolished in boundary changes) in 1918. He did not contest the 1918 General Election.

=== Cardiganshire by-election ===
In 1921, Williams fought the 1921 Cardiganshire by-election as an anti-Coalition Liberal, opposing Ernest Evans, Lloyd George's Private Secretary, the Coalition candidate. Williams had by this time developed an intense personal hostility towards Lloyd George, and the campaign became to all intents and purposes a contest focused on the Prime Minister's record and personality.

Although he lost, Williams performed well and was generally felt to have won a moral victory, forcing Evans to rely on Conservative votes for his election. The contest created deep divisions within families, communities and chapel congregations, which lasted for many years. Kenneth O. Morgan suggests that the central issue of the campaign "scarcely warranted such feeling."

One of the last actions of Williams was to write a letter to Lloyd George attempting reconciliation.

== Literary output ==
Williams wrote a number of short works in Welsh, including Gwilym a Benni Bach and Gwr y Dolau, which were popular in their day. He published a number of scholarly articles on Welsh history, notably on the Tudor period, under the auspices the Cymmrodorion. Several of these were later published in book form in 1919 as The Making of Modern Wales. He was not a professional, and saw Welsh history more in terms of Welsh Nationalism than an objective account of the past. Accordingly, he refused to accept the evidence of Iolo Morgannwg's forgeries.

== Personal life ==
Williams married Eleanor Jane Jenkins in 1891. She was the daughter of James Jenkins, a former member of Carmarthenshire County Council.

Williams died on 22 April 1922, aged 55.

== Notes ==
Parliament of the United Kingdom
Preceded by Alfred Davies	Member of Parliament for Carmarthen Boroughs; 1906–1918	Constituency abolished
