= Ivor Rees =

Welsh recipient of the Victoria Cross

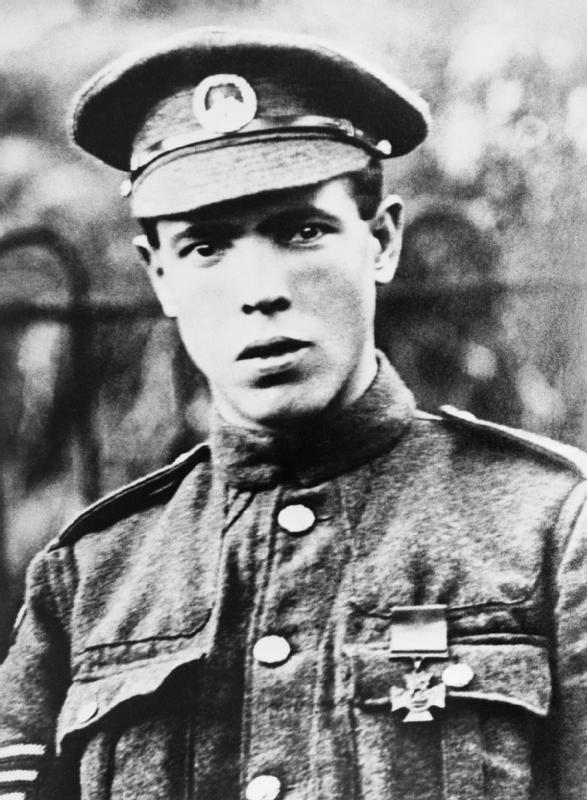
- Born: 18 October 1893; Felinfoel, Carmarthenshire, Wales
- Died: 11 March 1967 (aged 73); Llanelli, Carmarthenshire, Wales
- Military career
- Allegiance: United Kingdom
- Branch: British Army
- Rank: Company Sergeant-Major
- Service number: 20002
- Units: South Wales Borderers; Home Guard
- Conflicts: First World War; Second World War
- Awards: Victoria Cross

Company Sergeant Major Ivor Rees VC (18 October 1893 – 11 March 1967) was a Welsh recipient of the Victoria Cross, the highest and most prestigious award for gallantry in the face of the enemy that can be awarded to members of the British and Commonwealth forces.

== Details ==
Rees was born at Felinfoel. He enlisted into the 11th Battalion, South Wales Borderers, part of the 115th Brigade, 38th (Welsh) Division. Rees survived the fighting at Mametz Wood, and moved with the Division to Ypres. At Ypres, the Battalion were tasked with the capture of the Pilckem Ridge – a heavily fortified German defensive line during the Battle of Passchendaele.

His citation read:

At Pilckem, Belgium, on 31st July 1917, an enemy machine gun inflicted many casualties when it opened fire at close range. Sergeant Rees, leading his platoon, gradually worked his way round the right flank, by making short rushes, to the rear of the gun position. At 20 yards from the machine gun, Sergeant Rees rushed forward towards it, shooting one of the crew, and bayoneting the other. He bombed a large concrete emplacement, killing five of the enemy and taking 30 prisoners, including two officers and capturing a machine gun, undamaged.

— London Gazette, 14 September 1917

== Later life ==
During the Second World War, he served as a Company Sergeant-Major in the Home Guard. Rees died on 12 March 1967 at Llanelli, Carmarthenshire, Wales. He should not be confused with Lionel Rees vc.

== Legacy ==
Rees is remembered on memorials in Havard Chapel, Brecon Cathedral and at Llanelli Town Hall, Carmarthenshire.

His Victoria Cross is owned by the Regimental Museum of The Royal Welsh, Brecon, Powys, Wales.

== Bibliography ==
- Snelling, Stephen (2012) [1998]. Passchendaele 1917. VCs of the First World War. The History Press. ISBN 978-0752476667.
