= David Bowen, Felinfoel =

Welsh Baptist minister (1774–1853)

David Bowen (11 December 1774 – 18 November 1853) was a Welsh Baptist minister. He was born in Felinfoel, Carmarthenshire. In 1797 he was baptised at the local church; he began preaching at that same church in 1798. In 1806 he was ordained by Titus Lewis and Joshua Watkins and was appointed as joint-minister with Daniel Davies. In 1831 the congregation of the newly formed Capel Seion in Llanelli chose him to be its pastor, a position he held until his death in 1853.
