= Swansea Bay (region) =

Area of Wales

Coordinates: 51°35′N 3°54′W

The Swansea Bay area of Wales is located north of the sea area of Swansea Bay. The term Swansea Bay is used by the Welsh Government for policy planning purposes as well as by a number of other organisations.

The boundaries of Swansea Bay are defined in the Welsh Assembly Government's Spatial Plan Data Project. In the Wales Spatial Plan, Swansea Bay includes all of the unitary authorities of Swansea and Neath Port Talbot and parts of Carmarthenshire, Powys and Bridgend county borough. The area is also a travel to work area, which was defined in 2007. The Wales Spatial Plan identifies twenty-one key settlements in the area:

- Swansea
- Carmarthen
- Ammanford & Cross Hands
- Llanelli
- Gorseinon & Penllergaer
- Pontardawe & Clydach
- Maesteg
- Neath
- Port Talbot
- Porthcawl & Pyle
- Burry Port & Pembrey
- Dulais Valley
- Glynneath & Resolven
- Gowerton & Waunarlwydd
- Kidwelly & Trimsaran
- Llandeilo
- Penclawdd & Crofty
- Pontarddulais
- Upper Afan Valley
- Upper Amman Valley
- Ystalyfera & Ystradgynlais

The population in the region as of 2007 is approximately 561,900.

== Development areas ==
Welsh Assembly Government supported developments:

- Baglan Energy Park
- Coed Darcy
- Crosshands Business Park
- Felindre
- Llanelli Waterside
- SA1 Swansea Waterfront
- Swansea city centre
- Swansea Vale

== Swansea Bay city region ==
The whole of Swansea Bay was being touted as a future city region that would have the city of Swansea as its focus but also include the urban settlements contiguous to Swansea; these would be Llanelli, Neath, Port Talbot, Ystradgynlais and Ammanford. The predicted size of this new city region is around 700,000 people who would live within 30 minutes drive from the centre of Swansea.

Following a Welsh Government commissioned report recommending the creation of the city region in July 2012, the Swansea Bay city region was established on 18 July 2013. The city region would include the local authorities of Pembrokeshire, Carmarthenshire, Neath Port Talbot and Swansea. Sir Terry Matthews has been appointed chairman of the Swansea Bay City Region Board.
