= Machynys Ponds =

Protected area in Carmarthenshire, Wales

- Site of Special Scientific Interest
- Location within Carmarthenshire
- Location of Machynys Ponds.
- Area of search: Carmarthenshire
- Grid reference: SS512980
- Coordinates: 51.660996°N 4.151552°W
- Area: 6.4 hectares (16 acres)
- Notification date: 1987

Machynys Ponds (Welsh: Pyllau Machynys) is a Site of Special Scientific Interest (SSSI) in Carmarthenshire, Wales, designated in 1993 for its botanical features.

== SSSI ==
Machynys Ponds SSSI is located approximately 1 mile (1.6 km) to the south-east of Llanelli and immediately to the east of the village of Machynys. The site is approximately 0.25 miles (0.40 km) inland from the north bank of the River Loughor estuary, covers 6.4 hectares (16 acres) and is 15 metres (49 ft) above sea-level.

The SSSI comprises four ponds, one large and to the east, three smaller, connected by fen-carr hosting willow and scrub. The site is designated for its standing-water and swamp habitats, which are of interest of themselves, but also support a diverse and rich species mix. Of special note, and an additional reason for designation, is the presence of 14 species of dragonfly and damselfly found at the ponds.

The ponds are situated on a glacial terminal moraine – debris at the front of a glacier – which forms the Machynys Peninsula. They are flooded clay pits, dug to supply local 19th century brickworks and inundated in a great storm in 1896, and are in part of interest for the habitats that have formed in the decades since their creation.

The large pond is populated with spiked water-milfoil (Myriophylium spicatum), Canadian waterweed (Elodea canadensis), yellow-flowered fringed water-lily (Nymphoides peltata), and beds of bulrush (Typha latifolia), common reed (Phragmites australis), sea club-rush (Scirpus maritimus) and grey club-rush (Schoenoplectus tabernaemontani). The pond provides a habitat and breeding ground for a variety of waterfowl such as the mute swan, tufted duck, coot and dabchick. Other avians species nesting at the pond include gadwall, water rail, reed warbler, sedge warbler, reed bunting and other passerines.

The three smaller ponds are more shallow – one sufficiently so to dry up in times of low rainfall. They host rushes (Juncaceae) and bulrush, water mint (Mentha aquatica), false fox-sedge (Carex otrubae), great willowherb (Epilobium hirsutum), common fleabane (Pulicaria dysenterica), gipsywort (Lyccous europaeus), branched bur-reed (Sparganium erectum), common marsh-bedstraw (Galium palusrre), and water-plantain (Alisma plantago-aquatica). Two species, parsley water-dropwort (Oenanthe lachenalii) and sea club-rush indicate brackish water.

More shallow areas of the ponds contain mare's-tail (Hippuris vulgaris) and lesser water-parsnip (Berula erecta), grey willow (Salix cinerea); various-leaved water-starwort (Callitriche platycarpa), brackish water-crowfoot (Ranunculus baudotii) and stonewort (Chara vuloaris).

Amongst the dragonfly fauna of the site are the fenland hairy dragonfly (Brachytron pratense), the black-tailed skimmer (Orthetrum cancellatum), the ruddy darter (Symtetrum sanguineum), and the migrant hawker (Aeshna mixta). The site also hosts a diversity of beetle and fly species, and the profile of invertebrates found at the ponds is found to be related to ponds of south and south-east England.

== See also ==
- List of Sites of Special Scientific Interest in Carmarthenshire
