= 1894–1913 Llanelly Urban District Council elections =

Urban district of Wales (1894–1913)

The Municipal Borough of Llanelly was an urban district in Carmarthenshire between 1894 and 1913 when it received full borough status.

== 1894 election ==
The first election was held in December 1894.

=== Ward One ===
Ward One 1894
Party	Candidate	Votes	%	±%
	Ernest Trubshaw	982		
	J. Hammond	808		
	John Griffiths	807		
	Tom Hughes	764		
	J. Mayberry	592		
	D.W. Rees	554		
	H.J. Howell	513		
	J. Samuel	402		
	W.J. Wilson	332		

=== Ward Two ===
Ward Two 1894
Party	Candidate	Votes	%	±%
	F.C. Thompson	769		
	John Hopkins	643		
	J.D. Guest	643		
	W.W. Brodie	631		
	J.A. Jones	612		
	Ellis Evans	503		
	Joseph Williams	475		
	W. Hughes	333		
	W. Davies	273		
	J. Harries	259		

=== Ward Three ===
Ward Three 1894
Party	Candidate	Votes	%	±%
	William Howell	412		
	J.S. Tregoning	347		
	Owen Charles	333		
	David Thomas	330		
	Evan Jones	316		
	John Thomas	281		
	W. Stone	278		
	John Bourne	272		
	H.J. Howell	238		
	David Paton	233		
	David Francis	205		

== 1896 election ==
At the second election in March 1896, only one ward was contested. One of the sitting members was defeated.

=== Ward One ===
Ward One 1896
Party	Candidate	Votes	%	±%
	J. Mayberry*	Unopposed		
	D.W. Rees*	Unopposed		

=== Ward Two ===
Ward Two 1896
Party	Candidate	Votes	%	±%
	Ellis Evans*	Unopposed		
	David James	Unopposed		

=== Ward Three ===
Ward Three 1896
Party	Candidate	Votes	%	±%
	John Thomas*	428		
	Joseph Williams	345		
	Evan Jones*	316		

== 1897 election ==
The third election was held in April 1897 and three of the retiring members lost their seats. In Ward 3 it was suggested that denominational factors played a part as the two successful candidates were Baptists while he defeated candidates were Congregationalists.

=== Ward One ===
Ward One 1897
Party	Candidate	Votes	%	±%
	Tom Hughes*	753		
	John Griffiths*	673		
	G.F. Blake	265		

=== Ward Two ===
Ward Two 1897
Party	Candidate	Votes	%	±%
	Arthur H. Davies	730		
	W. Knoyle	390		
	W.W. Brodie*	331		

=== Ward Three ===
Ward Three 1897
Party	Candidate	Votes	%	±%
	Josiah Davies	374		
	W. Coombs	238		
	Owen Charles*	237		
	David Thomas*	186		

== 1898 election ==
At the fourth election in April 1898, only one ward was contested as had happened two years previously. In Ward 3, David Thomas narrowly failed to regain the seat he lost the previous year.

=== Ward One ===
Ward One 1898
Party	Candidate	Votes	%	±%
	James Hammond*	Unopposed		
	Ernest Trubshaw*	Unopposed		

=== Ward Two ===
Ward Two 1898
Party	Candidate	Votes	%	±%
	Herbert Francis	Unopposed		
	John Hopkins*	Unopposed		

=== Ward Three ===
Ward Three 1898
Party	Candidate	Votes	%	±%
	Daniel Williams	371		
	John S. Tregoning jnr.*	350		
	David Thomas	346		

== 1899 election ==
At the fifth election in March 1899, only one Ward 2, where the two sitting members stood down, was contested. The result in Ward 2 was decisive.

=== Ward One ===
Ward One 1899
Party	Candidate	Votes	%	±%
	J. Mayberry*	Unopposed		
	J. Allen Williams*	Unopposed		

=== Ward Two ===
Ward Two 1899
Party	Candidate	Votes	%	±%
	Frank Vivian	897		
	William Wilkins	625		
	David Harries	335		
	D. Rees Edmunds	261		

=== Ward Three ===
Ward Three 1899
Party	Candidate	Votes	%	±%
	John Thomas*	Unopposed		
	Joseph Williams*	Unopposed		

== 1900 election ==
The sixth election was held in April 1900 with two of the three seats being contested. The local Trades and Labour Council ran a candidate, successfully, in Ward 2, although the candidacy was strongly opposed by the Llanelly Mercury, whose editor W.B. Jones had himself been mentioned as a possible labour candidate.

=== Ward One ===
Ward One 1900
Party	Candidate	Votes	%	±%
	Tom Hughes*	Unopposed		
	John Griffiths*	Unopposed		

=== Ward Two ===
Ward Two 1900
Party	Candidate	Votes	%	±%
Labour	D.J. Davies	731		
	Jeremiah Williams	678		
	W. Knoyle*	361		

=== Ward Three ===
Ward Three 1900
Party	Candidate	Votes	%	±%
	Josiah Davies*	277		
	Evan Jones	254		
	David Thomas	208		
	W. Coombs*	205		

== 1901 election ==
At the seventh election in March 1901, two wards were contested, and in Ward 2, the editor of the Llanelly Mercury, whose candidacy had been canvassed the previous year, captured one of the seats.

=== Ward One ===
Ward One 1901
Party	Candidate	Votes	%	±%
	D. Rees Edmunds	Unopposed		
	Ernest Trubshaw*	Unopposed		

=== Ward Two ===
Ward Two 1901
Party	Candidate	Votes	%	±%
	W.B. Jones	705		
	Daniel Williams*	630		
	John Hopkins*	559		

=== Ward Three ===
Ward Three 1901
Party	Candidate	Votes	%	±%
	John S. Tregoning jnr.*	449		
	David Thomas	432		
	Collwyn Morgan	256		

== 1902 election ==
The eighth election, held in 1902, was the first occasion upon which all wards were uncontested. W. Bramwell Jones was elected to the seat vacated by the death of John Allen Williams, editor of the Llanelly Guardian.

=== Ward One ===
Ward One 1902
Party	Candidate	Votes	%	±%
	Joseph Mayberry*	Unopposed		
	William Wilkins*	Unopposed		

=== Ward Two ===
Ward Two 1902
Party	Candidate	Votes	%	±%
	W. Bramwell Jones	Unopposed		
	Frank G. Vivian*	Unopposed		

=== Ward Three ===
Ward Three 1902
Party	Candidate	Votes	%	±%
	John Thomas*	Unopposed		
	Joseph Williams*	Unopposed		

== 1903 election ==
The ninth election, held in April 1903 saw a contest in one of the three wards. Two retiring members, namely John Griffiths (Ward 1) and Jeremiah Williams (Ward 2), both died shortly before the election. In Ward 3, the two official Liberal candidates prevailed.

=== Ward One ===
Ward One 1903
Party	Candidate	Votes	%	±%
	Tom Hughes*	Unopposed		
	E.T. Jones	Unopposed		

=== Ward Two ===
Ward Two 1903
Party	Candidate	Votes	%	±%
Labour	D. James Davies	Unopposed		
	Ellis Evans	Unopposed		

=== Ward Three ===
Ward Three 1903
Party	Candidate	Votes	%	±%
Liberal	S.H. Bevan	492		
Liberal	William Eynon	463		
Labour	Evan Jones*	334		
Conservative	Nathan Griffiths	149		

== 1904 election ==
At the tenth election in 1904, there were contests in Wards 1 and 2. Ernest Trubshaw, a member since the beginning, did not seek re-election while D.R. Edmunds switched from Ward 1 to Ward 2, where the editor of the Mercury, W.B. Jons, lost his seat. In Ward 3, John S. Tregoning jnr., a member of the council since its formation was one of two candidates returned unopposed.

=== Ward One ===
Ward One 1904
Party	Candidate	Votes	%	±%
	Richard Guest	642		
	William David	520		
	D.R. Williams	372		

=== Ward Two ===
Ward Two 1904
Party	Candidate	Votes	%	±%
	D.R. Edmunds*	680		
	John John	608		
	W.B. Jones*	596		

=== Ward Three ===
Ward Three 1904
Party	Candidate	Votes	%	±%
	Herbert D. Rees	Unopposed		
	John S. Tregoning jnr.*	Unopposed		

== 1905 election ==
The eleventh election was held in 1905, with the members in two wards being returned unopposed. In Ward 1, Joseph Maybery, a member of the Council since it was established, stood down at the last moment and the seat was won by a Trades and Labour Council candidate.

=== Ward One ===
Ward One 1905
Party	Candidate	Votes	%	±%
	William Wilkins*	660		
Labour	John Simlett	518		
	Aaron Stone	341		

=== Ward Two ===
Ward Two 1905
Party	Candidate	Votes	%	±%
	W. Bramwell Jones*	Unopposed		
	Frank G. Vivian*	Unopposed		

=== Ward Three ===
Ward Three 1905
Party	Candidate	Votes	%	±%
	John Thomas*	Unopposed		
	Joseph Williams*	Unopposed		

== 1906 election ==
The twelfth election, held in April 1906 saw contests in all three wards.

=== Ward One ===
Ward One 1906
Party	Candidate	Votes	%	±%
	E.T. Jones*	812		
	Joseph Roberts	494		
	G. Mercer	434		
	W.T. Davies	374		

=== Ward Two ===
Ward Two 1906
Party	Candidate	Votes	%	±%
	William Thomas	836		
Labour	D. James Davies	753		
	T. Harries	415		

=== Ward Three ===
Ward Three 1906
Party	Candidate	Votes	%	±%
	S.H. Bevan*	447		
	Nathan Griffiths	390		
	William Eynon*	383		

== 1907 election ==
The thirteenth elections saw contest in all wards and J.S. Tregoning, a member of the Council since its formation, lost his seat.

=== Ward One ===
Ward One 1907
Party	Candidate	Votes	%	±%
Liberal	William David*	749		
Labour	William Roberts	719		
Liberal	Richard Guest*	562		
Conservative	G. Mercer	527		
Independent	Philip Williams	417		
Labour	James Evans	64		

=== Ward Two ===
Ward Two 1907
Party	Candidate	Votes	%	±%
Liberal	D.R. Edmunds*	738		
Liberal	D.R. Jones	704		
Liberal	David Phillips	596		
Labour	J. Rossiter	329		

=== Ward Three ===
Ward Three 1907
Party	Candidate	Votes	%	±%
Liberal	Herbert D. Rees*	686		
Labour	Evan Evans	399		
Conservative	John S. Tregoning jnr.*	359		

== 1908 election ==
The fourteenth election saw contests in two wards.

=== Ward One ===
Ward One 1908
Party	Candidate	Votes	%	±%
	Richard Guest*	Unopposed		
Labour	John Simlett	Unopposed		

=== Ward Two ===
Ward Two 1908
Party	Candidate	Votes	%	±%
Liberal	Frank G. Vivian*	945		
Liberal	W. Bramwell Jones*	909		
Labour	Edward Sherlock	484		
Independent	Philip Williams	342		

=== Ward Three ===
Ward Three 1908
Party	Candidate	Votes	%	±%
Liberal	J. Walter Thomas	467		
Liberal	Joseph Williams*	Unopposed		
Independent	J.L. Jones	352		
Labour	W. Scott	184		

== 1909 election ==
The fifteenth election, held in April 1909 saw contests in Wards 2 and 3. Two sitting members lost their seats.

=== Ward One ===
Ward One 1909
Party	Candidate	Votes	%	±%
	E.T. Jones*	Unopposed		
	Joseph Roberts*	Unopposed		

=== Ward Two ===
Ward Two 1909
Party	Candidate	Votes	%	±%
	Thomas Jones	979		
Labour	D. James Davies*	745		
	T. Harries*	699		

=== Ward Three ===
Ward Three 1909
Party	Candidate	Votes	%	±%
	Nathan Griffiths*	474		
	John Smith	468		
	John L. Jones	328		
	S.H. Bevan*	308		

== 1910 Llanelly Urban District Council election ==
All three wards were contested, and a bitter fight in Ward One where it was claimed that William David had been subject to unfair criticisms.

=== Ward One ===
Ward One 1910
Party	Candidate	Votes	%	±%
Independent	William Vivian	841		
Labour	W.H. Samuel	747		
Labour	William Roberts	558		
Liberal	William David*	393		

=== Ward Two ===
Ward Two 1910
Party	Candidate	Votes	%	±%
Liberal	D.R. Jones*	1,007		
Liberal	E. Willis Jones	870		
Labour	G.H. Stacey	767		

=== Ward Three ===
Ward Three 1910
Party	Candidate	Votes	%	±%
Liberal	Herbert D. Rees*	612		
Liberal	Charles Randall	537		
Labour	Evan Evans*	366		
Conservative	J. Vaughan Evans	114		

== 1911 Llanelly Urban District Council election ==
All three wards were contested. John Simlett held his seat for Labour in Ward one but the other Labour candidates were unsuccessful. The main surprise was the defeat of J. Walter Thomas in Ward Three.

=== Ward One ===
Ward One 1911
Party	Candidate	Votes	%	±%
Labour	John Simlett	864		
Independent	Roland P. Thomas	812		
Independent	Arthur Evans	416		

=== Ward Two ===
Ward Two 1911
Party	Candidate	Votes	%	±%
Liberal	W. Bramwell Jones*	887		
Liberal	Frank G. Vivian*	868		
Labour	G.H. Stacey	574		

=== Ward Three ===
Ward Three 1911
Party	Candidate	Votes	%	±%
Independent	David Richards	468		
Independent	J.L. Jones	358		
Liberal	J. Walter Thomas*	329		
Labour	G. James	156		

== 1912 Llanelly Urban District Council election ==
All three wards were contested and a heavy poll was expected owing to workmen being on strike. Five of the six members seeking re-election were successful.

=== Ward One ===
Ward One 1912
Party	Candidate	Votes	%	±%
Labour	Joseph Roberts*	849		
	E.T. Jones*	783		
	W.T. Davies	758		

=== Ward Two ===
Ward Two 1912
Party	Candidate	Votes	%	±%
	Thomas Jones*	1,189		
Labour	D.J. Jones*	787		
	Sam Jones	651		
	J. Vaughan Evans	277		

=== Ward Three ===
Ward Three 1912
Party	Candidate	Votes	%	±%
	Nathan Griffiths*	483		
	J. Walter Thomas	479		
	John Waters	430		
	John Smith*	210		

== 1913 Llanelly Urban District Council election ==
In the final election before the incorporation of Llanelli as a municipal borough, there were contested elections in Ward One, where there were three vacancies following the death of E.T. Jones, and in Ward Two. In Ward Three, Labour gained a seat unopposed after sitting member Charles Randall stood down. The contested election saw the loss of one labour seat in Ward One.

=== Ward One ===
Ward One 1913
Party	Candidate	Votes	%	±%
Labour	W.H. Samuel*	1,004		
Independent	W.T. Davies	814		
Independent	Gwilym R. Price	810		
Labour	W. Vivian*	603		
Independent	J.P. Hughes	547		

=== Ward Two ===
Ward Two 1913
Party	Candidate	Votes	%	±%
Liberal	E. Willis Jones*	920		
Liberal	D.R. Jones*	844		
Labour	Sam Jones	706		
Independent	T. Hay Samuel	88		

=== Ward Three ===
Ward Three 1913
Party	Candidate	Votes	%	±%
Liberal	Herbert D. Rees*	Unopposed		
Labour	Morgan Morgan	Unopposed		
