= Llanelli Waterside =

Suburban development in Llanelli, Wales

Llanelli Waterside (Welsh: Morlan Elli) is the marketing name given to the new suburb development in the coastal strip south west of the town of Llanelli, Wales. The scheme is a joint development between Carmarthenshire County Council and the Welsh Government. The project aims to create a mix of residential housing and business premises from reclaimed industrial land.

== Development zones ==
The project is divided into five zones:

=== North Dock ===
A commercial, leisure and retail development is planned for the dock rim. The comprises 100 acres (0.40 km^{2}) and forecast outputs are 1,000 homes, 500,000 sq ft (46,000 m^{2}) of business and office space and 25,000 sq. metres of commercial leisure developments.

=== Delta Lakes ===
Delta lakes is a 34-acre (140,000 m^{2}) site adjacent to the coastal link road. In 2023 construction of a wellness village named 'Pentre Awel' began on the site. The Pentre Awel project is split into four zones, with zone one currently under construction at an estimated cost of £93 million. Zone one will include a leisure centre and clinical and educational units as well as hospitality accessible by active travel links.

=== Sandywater Park ===
A mixed residential and leisure development is planned in this 4.3-acre (17,000 m^{2}) site situated next to a lake in west Llanelli.

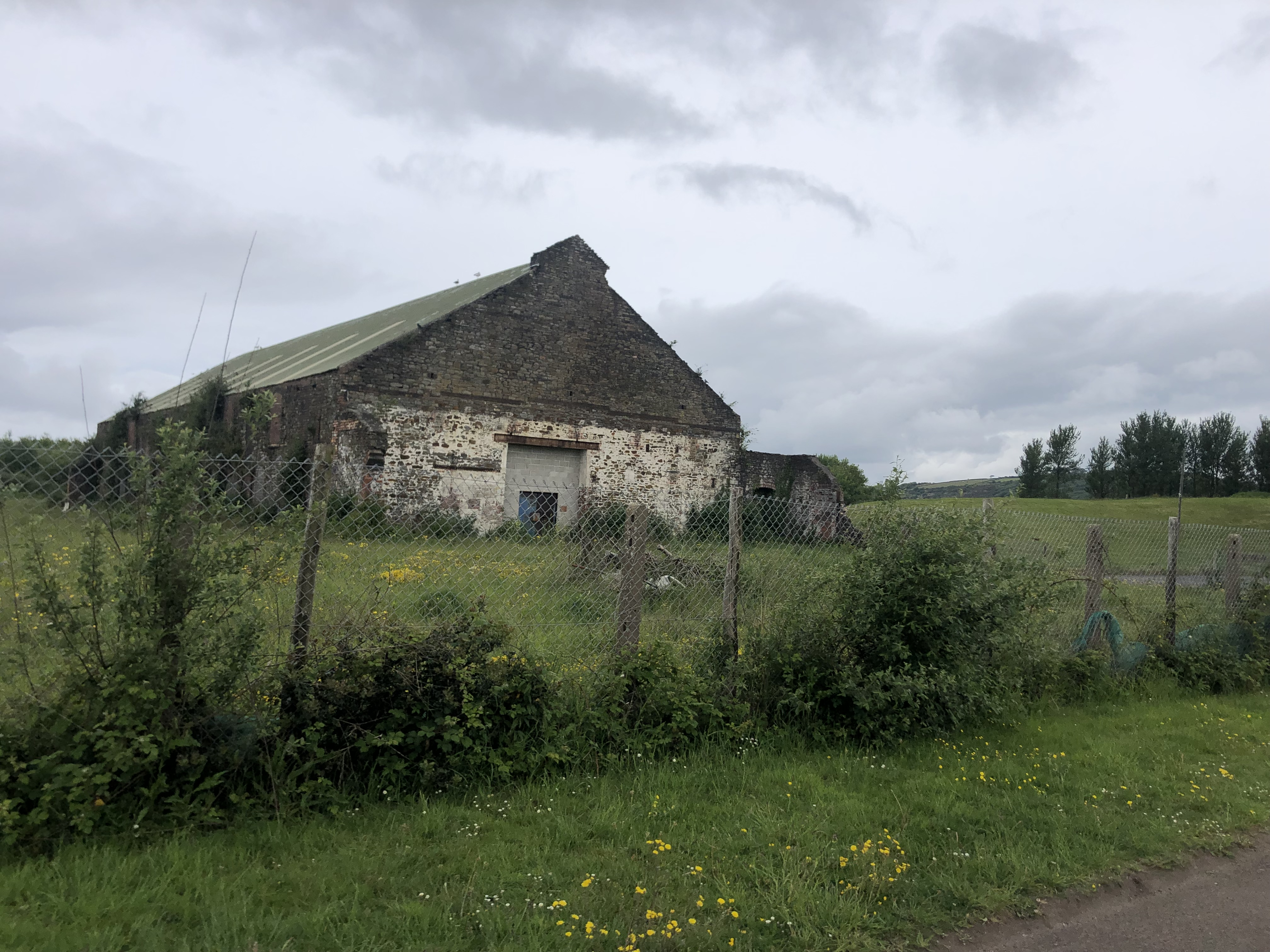
A shed at the Old Castle Works site which was earmarked for redevelopment

=== Old Castle Works ===
Old Castle Works was a tinplate manufacturing facility. It was earmarked for redevelopment as a commercial and leisure site by Carmarthenshire County Council.

In May 2007, an application was made for funding from the Big Lottery Fund. Named "The Works", the development would consist of an open plaza linking the two primary facilities – a cultural centre consisting of an auditorium, TV studio and an art-house cinema and the Grade II listed tinning shed which would be transformed into a restaurant and craft gallery. "The Works" would act in partnership with Coleg Sir Gâr, a local college, which would have use of the facilities for education purposes.

On 27 October 2007, Carmarthenshire County Council announced that the lottery bid had been unsuccessful, and that other means of funding the development would need to be considered.

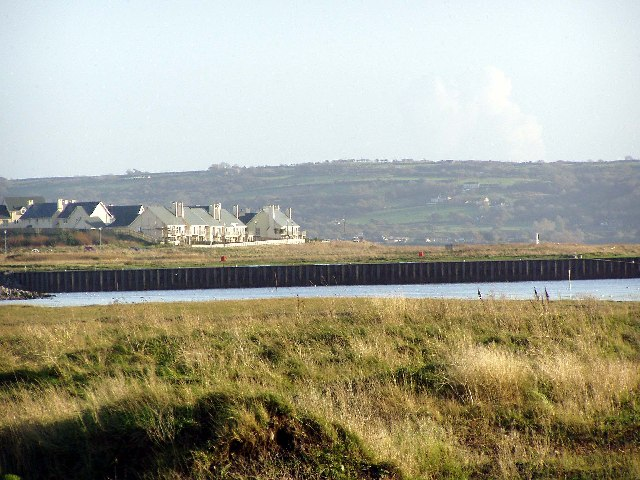
Pentre Nicklaus in Machynys, Llanelli

=== Machynys ===
The 2010s saw the opening of a new estate, Pentre Nicklaus Village. It overlooks the Welsh coast in the Machynys area.

== Sources ==
- WDA: Llanelli Waterside
- Developer shrugs off credit crunch with new waterside project
