= Gwladys Yvonne McKeon =

Welsh-born Australian biologist

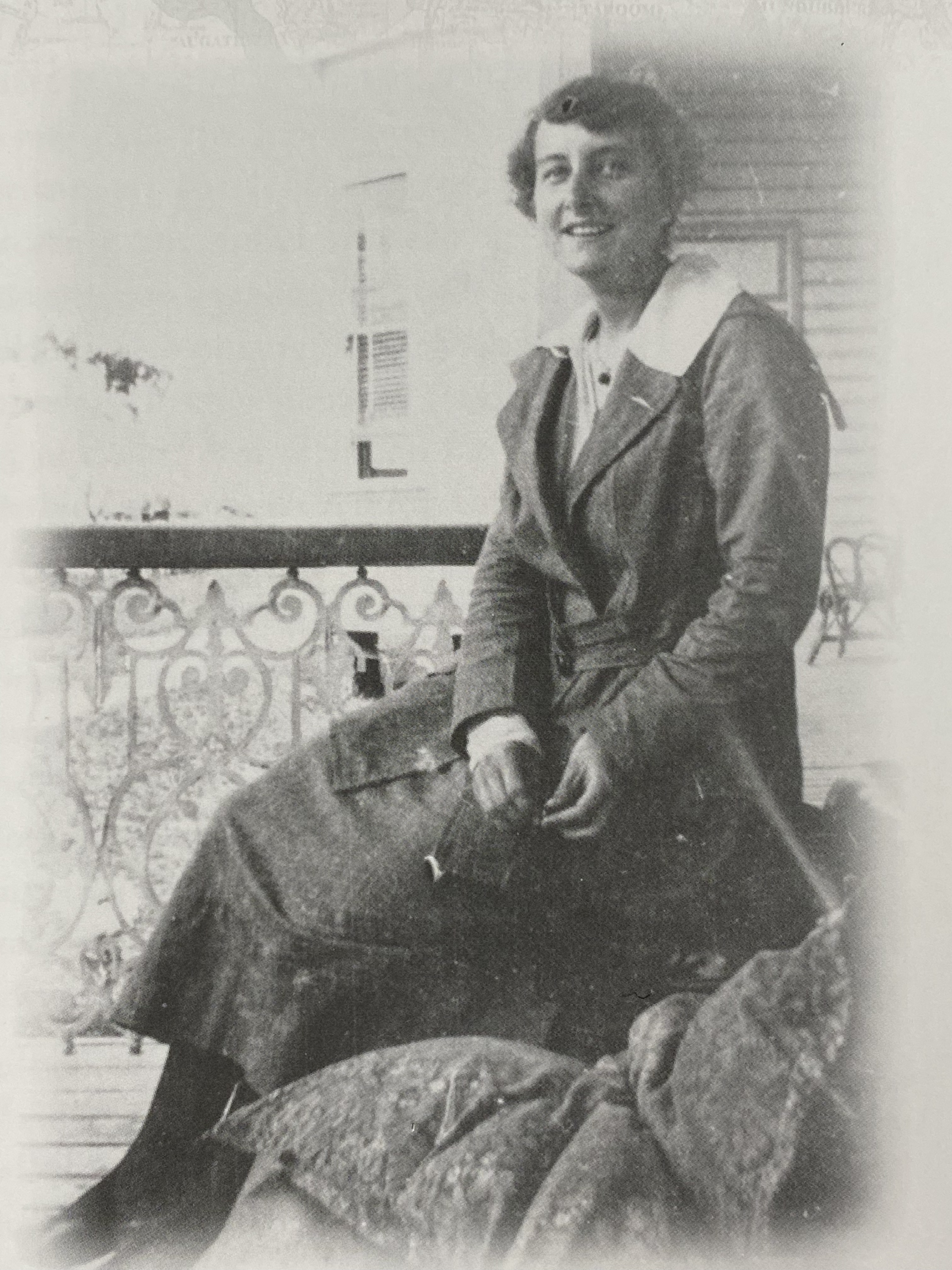
- McKeon in 1930
- Born: 23 August 1897; Llanelli, Wales
- Died: 15 August 1979 (aged 81); Australia
- Education: University of Queensland
- Scientific career
- Fields: marine biology

Gwladys Yvonne McKeon (23 August 1897 — 15 August 1979) was a Welsh-born Australian marine biologist. Though her paid employment in science was brief, she made contributions as a trained independent researcher through her life, culminating with her popular handbook, Life on the Australian Seashore (1966).

== Early life and education ==
Gwladys Yvonne James was born at Llanelli, Carmarthenshire, Wales, the daughter of a schoolmaster in Queensland. She was the youngest of her parents' seven children, born when the family was visiting in Wales. Gwladys lived in Wales until the family returned to Australia in 1899. She was educated at Albert State School in Maryborough, Maryborough Girls Grammar School, and University of Queensland, where she earned bachelor's (1918) and master's (1920) degrees in biology, focusing on parasitology.

== Career ==
Her first job after university was at the Tick Biology Station in West Burleigh, Queensland, where she collected data on the tick life cycle for livestock management applications. Within a few months she was hired as a microscopist on the Australian Hookworm Campaign. In the 1930s, she designed educational displays at the State Wheat Board in Toowoomba, where her husband was an office manager.

While raising her children and out of paid employment, Gwladys McKeon wrote a handbook, Life on the Australian Seashore (1966). The book featured McKeon's own ink and watercolor illustrations, and was based on years of collecting invertebrates and plant life from her home at Point Vernon in Hervey Bay. Her methodical gathering helped to build research collections of specimens at, among institutions, the Queensland Herbarium.

== Personal life ==
Gwladys Y. James married farmer Cecil McKeon in 1923, at Maryborough. They had five children. Gwladys Yvonne McKeon died in 1979, right before her 82nd birthday.
