= Llanelli Town Hall =

Municipal Building in Llanelli, Wales

- Neuadd y Dref Llanelli (Welsh)
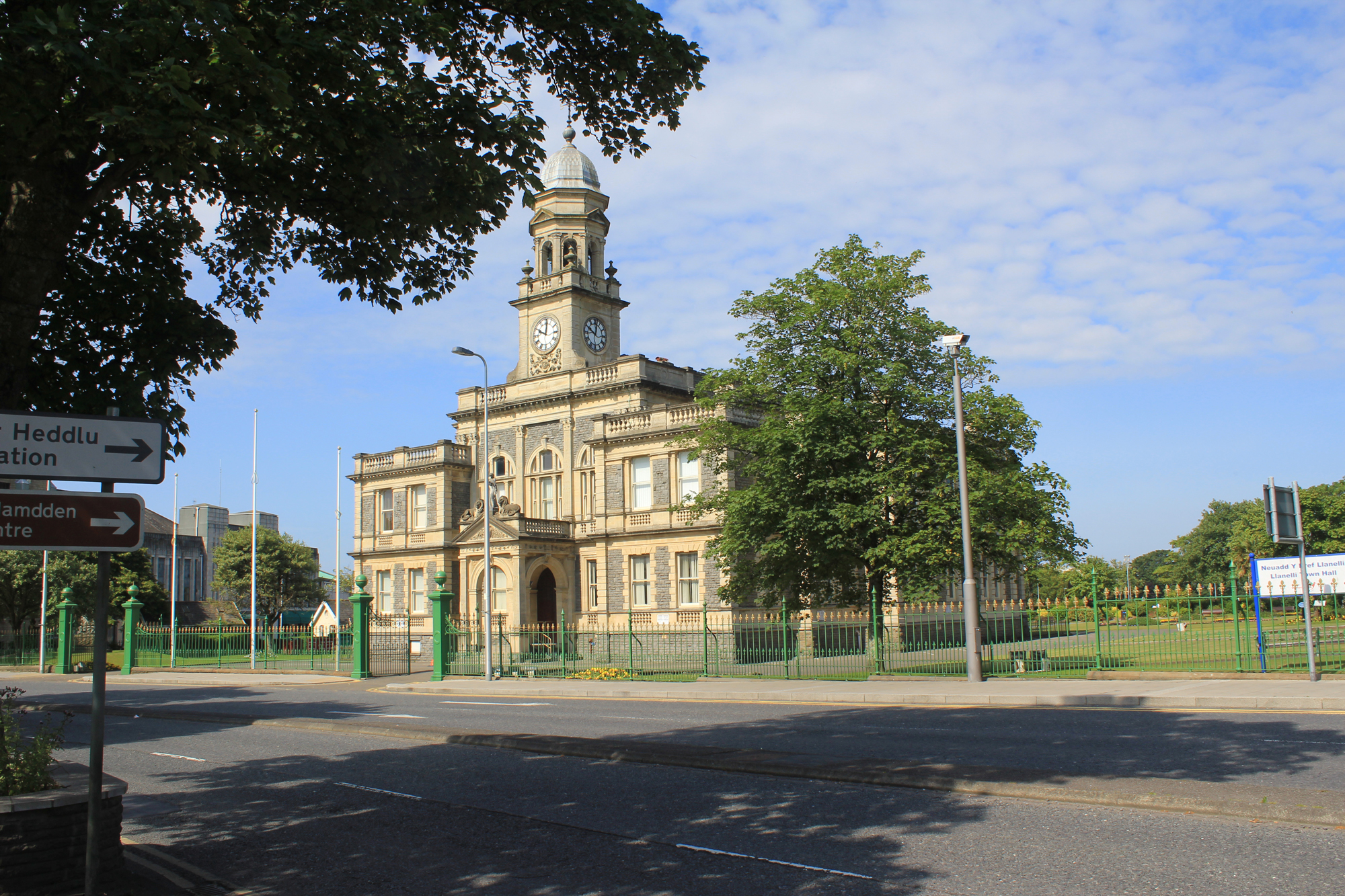
- Llanelli Town Hall

- Shown in Carmarthenshire
- 51.6818°N 4.1645°W
- Location: Church Street, Llanelli

History
- Built: 1896

Site notes
- Architect: Williams Griffiths
- Architectural style: Italianate style

Listed Building – Grade II
- Official name: The Town Hall
- Designated: 12 March 1992
- Reference no.: 11962

Llanelli Town Hall (Welsh: Neuadd y Dref Llanelli) is a municipal building in Church Street, Llanelli, Carmarthenshire, South Wales. The town hall, which was the headquarters of Llanelli Borough Council and now serves as a register office, is a Grade II listed building.

== History ==
In the 18th century the portreeve and burgesses of Llanelli met in the Falcon Inn in Thomas Street. The first purpose-built town hall in Llanelli, which was designed with arcading on the ground floor to allow markets to be held and with an assembly room on the first floor, was erected in Hall Street in 1827. The borough council, which had ceased to meet, was abolished under the Municipal Corporations Act 1883. However, the local board of health, which had been established in 1850, decided in the early 1890s to procure a new town hall: the site they selected was open land to the west of Church Street. Following significant population growth, largely associated with the coal mining and iron working industries, the area became an urban district in 1894.

The new building was the subject of a design competition, which was adjudicated by Charles Barry Jr.; however, the winning design was shelved in preference to the design of a local architect, Williams Griffiths. It was designed in the Italianate style, was built by a local contractor, T. P. Jones, in rubble stone with Bath stone dressings and was opened on 31 March 1896. The design involved a symmetrical main frontage with seven bays facing onto Church Street with the last two bays at each end projected forwards; the central section of three bays, which was taller than the other sections, featured a porch with Doric order pilasters supporting an entablature and a pediment with the head of a lion in the tympanum and a statue of justice flanked by lions above; there were tall round headed windows on the first floor flanked by Corinthian order pilasters supporting a cornice with modillions and a balustrade. There was a clock tower with an octagonal cupola at roof level. Internally, the principal room was the council chamber.

A war memorial intended to commemorate the lives of local service personnel who died in the Second Boer War was unveiled by Field Marshal Lord Roberts on 26 August 1905. The area was advanced to a municipal borough with the town hall as its headquarters in 1913. Meanwhile, a war memorial designed by Sir William Goscombe John intended to commemorate the lives of local service personnel who died in the First World War was unveiled by the former General Officer Commanding 53rd (Welsh) Infantry Division, Major-General Stanley Mott, on 27 October 1923.

The town hall continued to serve as the borough headquarters for much of the 20th century and, from 1974, as the headquarters of the enlarged Llanelli District Council. An office block to provide additional office space for the council was completed in 1981 on a site to the south of the town hall, on the opposite side of the street called Waunalnyrafon. It was designed by the council architects' department and was named Ty Elwyn after the former Lord Chancellor, Lord Elwyn-Jones.

The town hall ceased to be local seat of government when the re-established Carmarthenshire County Council replaced both Llanelli Borough Council and Dyfed County Council in 1996. The town hall and Ty Elwyn both passed to Carmarthenshire County Council, which continues to have offices in Ty Elwyn, and uses the town hall as a register office.

A plaque to commemorate the life of Sergeant Ivor Rees of the 11th Battalion, South Wales Borderers, who was awarded the Victoria Cross for his bravery at the Battle of Passchendaele during the First World War, was unveiled at the town hall on 31 July 2007.
