= Park Congregational Chapel, Llanelli =

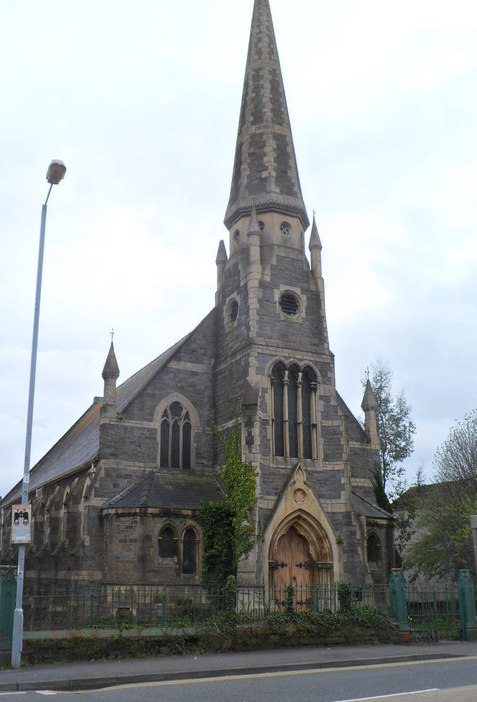
- Park Congregational Chapel, Llanelli
- 51.6802°N 4.1614°W
- Location: Junction of Murray Street and Inkerman Street, Llanelli
- Country: Wales
- Denomination: Congregational church

History
- Founded: 1864

Architecture
- Heritage designation: Grade II
- Designated: 3 December 1992
- Architectural type: Chapel
- Style: Late Gothic style

Park Congregational Chapel is a Congregational chapel in the town of Llanelli, Carmarthenshire, Wales. It was built in 1864 and is located at the junction between Murray Street and Inkerman Street. It was designated as a Grade II listed building on 3 December 1992.

== The chapel ==
Park Congregational Chapel was erected at a time when Llanelli had become a significant regional producer of tinplate and steel and the population was growing strongly and needed more buildings in which to worship. The architects were Lander and Bedells of London, and the chapel was built between 1864 and 1865 in the very Gothic but inaccurate style liked by the Congregationalists. The tower is square and slender and is capped by an octagonal collar and a plain stone spire. The interior of the chapel is smaller than one might expect, being rather low with a boarded end-gallery. There are large quantities of stained glass; Abbot and Co installed some in 1884 and 1908, others in 1919 and 1934 and a more recent example by Celtic Studios was installed in 1974.

The chapel was designated as a Grade II listed building on 3 December 1992, the reason for listing being that it is a fine example of a church of its period. The listing includes the spearhead railings on Inkerman Street with cast-iron Gothic gate-piers, which date from 1896. The Royal Commission on the Ancient and Historical Monuments of Wales curates the archaeological, architectural and historic records for this chapel. These include digital photographs of the exterior of the chapel and two RCAHMW digital photographic surveys of the building.

== Fire and aftermath ==
On 13 August 2015, the church was set on fire, probably by arsonists. Homes were evacuated in Murray Street and Inkerman Street. At its peak, 40 firefighters were at the scene. It took approximately 2 hours to be extinguished. The church was left badly damaged, with most of the roof burned off. Four teenagers were arrested afterwards, with one fined. After the fire, a surveyor went to check the status of the building, and deemed it safe. It was confirmed that the church would be rebuilt. In May 2016, the church was auctioned by Paul Fosh auctions, but was removed from market beforehand. The future of the church is currently unknown.
