= Llanelli Online =

Welsh online newspaper

- Website type: Online Newspaper
- Editor: Alan Evans
- Website: Llanelli Online
- Registration: 2016
- Launched: 2016; 10 years ago
- Current status: Active

Llanelli Online is a Welsh hyperlocal online newspaper covering the areas of Llanelli in the county of Carmarthenshire, Wales. It publishes daily content which covers news, sport, business and community. It began in November 2016.

Llanelli Online was regulated by Impress (Independent Monitor for the Press) in 2017 and 2018. The editor is Alan Evans, who is on the advisory board of the Independent Community News Network (ICNN).

In 2018 Llanelli Online became a partner with the BBC Local Democracy Scheme.
