= Zion Baptist Chapel, Llanelli =

Church in Carmarthenshire, Wales

Coordinates: 51.6836°N 4.1577°W

Zion Baptist Chapel
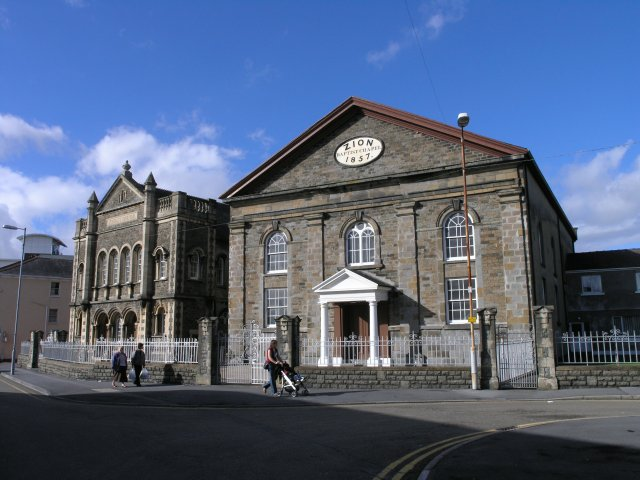
- Zion Baptist Chapel
- Location: Island Place, Llanelli
- Country: Wales
- Denomination: Baptist

History
- Founded: 1857

Architecture
- Heritage designation: Grade II
- Designated: 3 December 1992
- Architectural type: Chapel
- Style: Classical

Zion or Seion Baptist Chapel is a Baptist chapel in the town of Llanelli, Carmarthenshire, Wales. It was built in 1857 and is located at Island Place, close to the junction of Water Street with Upper Park Street.

The church was founded in 1831, before the erection of the present building. The congregation selected David Bowen, to be its pastor, a position he held until his death in 1853.

Zion Baptist Chapel was erected at a time when Llanelli had become a significant regional producer of tinplate and steel and the population was growing strongly and needed more buildings in which to worship. The building was designed by Henry Rogers and erected in 1857. It is the largest of the Baptist chapels in the town and has a three-bay façade with arched upper windows and a timber-pedimented porch. There are giant pilasters in greyish-brown local stone contrasting with ornamentations in brown sandstone. Inside the chapel is a large open space with galleries on all four sides, the organ gallery having been added in 1929. The congregation occupies box pews, some of which are tucked up under the galleries. Two schoolrooms dating from 1913 and built by William Griffiths adjoin the chapel.

The chapel was designated as a Grade II-listed building on 3 December 1992, as "a fine example of classical tradition in chapel building and one of a series of similar Baptist chapels in Llanelli". The listing includes the railings that face onto the street. The Royal Commission on the Ancient and Historical Monuments of Wales curates the archaeological, architectural and historic records for this church. These include digital photographs, a black and white postcard, transparencies and RCAHMW Digital Survey Archives.
