= Hall Street Methodist Church, Llanelli =

Hall Street Methodist and United Reformed Church
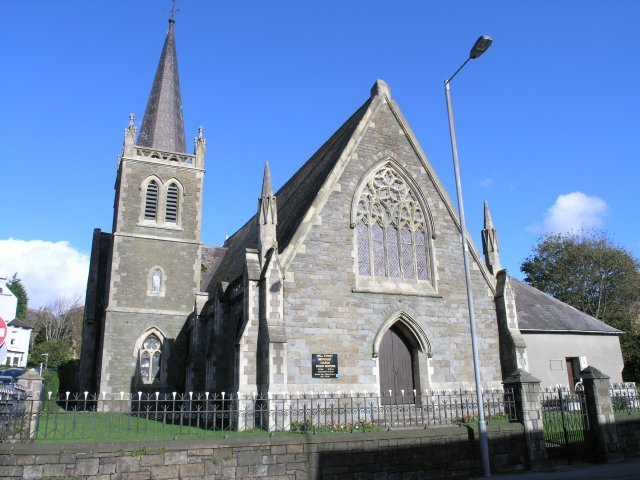
- Hall Street Methodist and United Reformed Church
- 51.6842°N 4.1636°W
- Location: Hall Street, Llanelli
- Country: Wales
- Denomination: Methodist and United Reformed

History
- Founded: 1856

Architecture
- Heritage designation: Grade II
- Designated: 3 December 1992
- Architectural type: Chapel
- Style: Late Gothic style

Hall Street Methodist and United Reformed Church is a local ecumenical partnership of two denominations in the original Methodist chapel in the town of Llanelli, Carmarthenshire, Wales. The present building was built in 1856 and is located in Hall Street. The chapel was designated as a Grade II listed building on 3 December 1992.

== The chapel ==
The first chapel here was built in 1838 but was already too small for the congregation two decades later, and so it was rebuilt in 1856. The new building was erected at a time when Llanelli became a significant regional producer of tinplate and steel and the population was growing strongly. The architect was James Wilson of Bath and the chapel is similar in design to his New King Street Chapel, Bath which had been built in 1847. Both buildings have large gabled facades with traceried windows, and in 1870, Hall Street Methodist Church was made more ecclesiastical by the inclusion of a chancel, transepts and the base of a tower. An upper stage of the tower and a spire was added by W. Griffiths in 1896 with Gothic-style pierced parapets. Inside the chapel had a large open space and an Anglican-like apse separated by a low barrier screen.

The chapel was designated as a Grade II listed building on 3 December 1992, the reason for listing being that it is an "elaborate Gothic chapel by the architect said to have led the Wesleyan church into the path of the Gothic Revival". The Royal Commission on the Ancient and Historical Monuments of Wales curates the archaeological, architectural and historic records for this church. These include digital photographs of the exterior and interior.
