= Soar Chapel, Llanelli =

Former chapel in Llanelli, Carmarthenshire, Wales

Coordinates: 51.6756°N 4.1600°W

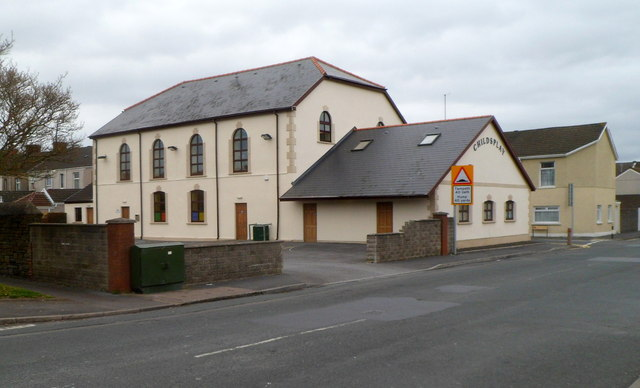
The building of Soar Chapel in 2012

Soar Welsh Independent Chapel was an Independent (Congregationalist) chapel in Marsh Street, Llanelli, Carmarthenshire, Wales. Services at Soar were conducted in the Welsh language.

The chapel was established in the 1880s after a split at the neighbouring Ebenezer church. Ebenezer's minister, Trefor Davies, together with a large proportion of the members, left to form Soar after a dispute that was reported upon but not explained fully in the local press. Trefor Davies remained minister at Soar until his death in 1933.

E. D. Morgan became minister in 1961 and remained at Soar for thirty years. Huw Edwards suggests that it was Morgan's efforts that enabled Soar to stay open as long as it did.

After a period of decline and a failure to form a united ministry with other churches, Soar closed in 2005.

As of 2019 the building is in use as a children's nursery.

== Sources ==
- Edwards, Huw (2009). Capeli Llanelli. Our Rich Heritage. Carmarthenshire County Council. pp. 89–108. ISBN 978-0-906821-77-0.
