= Machynys =

Coastal area in Carmarthenshire, Wales

Coordinates: 51.662°N 4.159°W

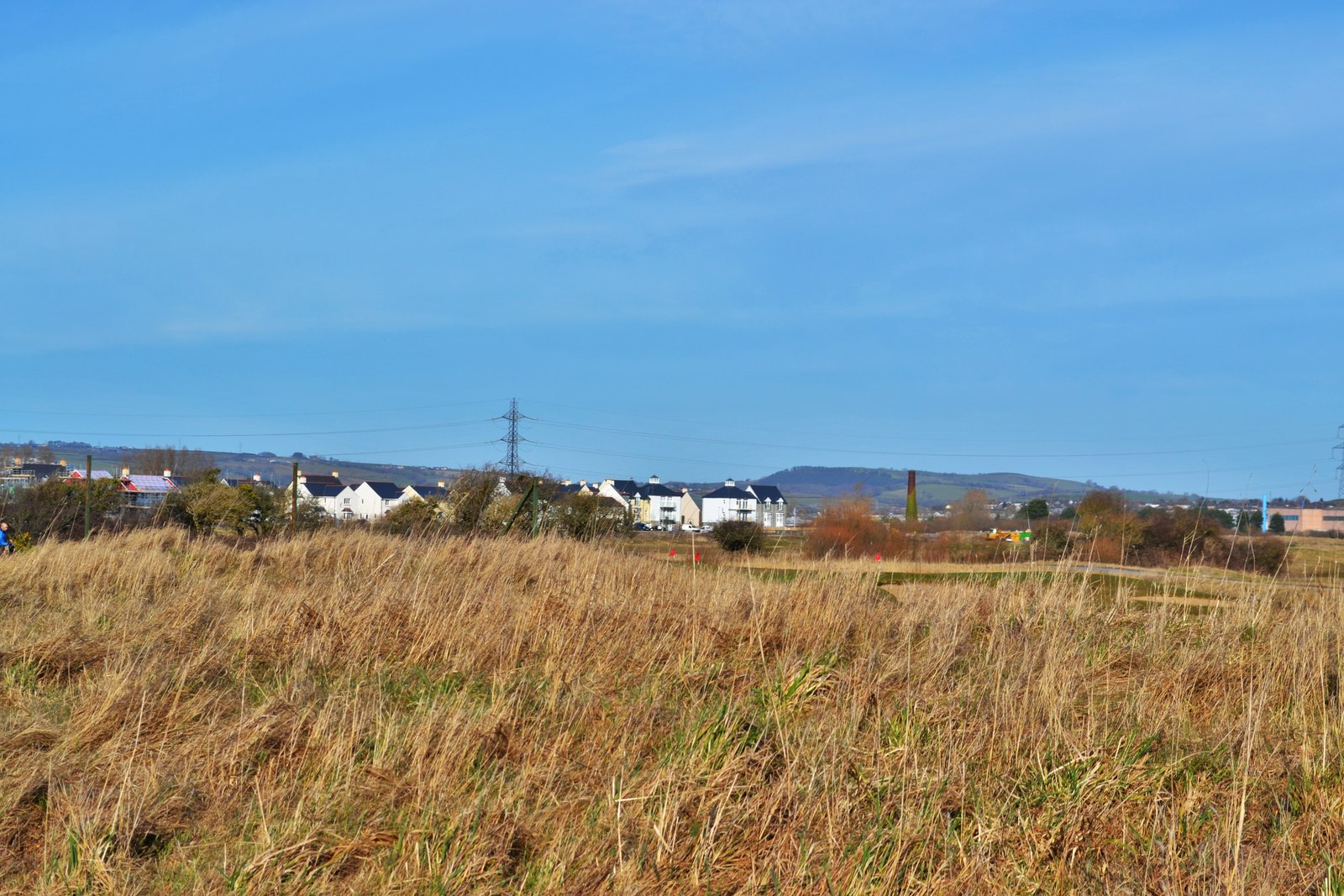
- View from Machynys Golf Course

- Location within Carmarthenshire
- OS grid reference: SS508980
- Community: Llanelli
- Principal area: Carmarthenshire
- Preserved county: Dyfed
- Country: Wales
- Sovereign state: United Kingdom
- Post town: LLANELLI
- Postcode district: SA14
- Dialling code: 01554
- Police: Dyfed-Powys
- Fire: Mid and West Wales
- Ambulance: Welsh
- UK Parliament: Llanelli
- Senedd Cymru – Welsh Parliament: Llanelli

Machynys, or Machynys Peninsula is a coastal area just to the south of Llanelli in Carmarthenshire, Wales. In the nineteenth century an industrial community lived here working at the brickworks and tinplate works that occupied the site. When the industrial activity ceased in the mid-twentieth century, the buildings were demolished and the site lay derelict. It has now been redeveloped as a golf course as part of the Llanelli Waterside regeneration plan.

== History ==
Machynys is said by some to mean "Monk's Island", presumably assuming it to be a truncated form of "mynachynys" (mynach = monk, ynys = island), but such a compound form would be most unusual in Welsh and there are no earlier forms to support it. Local legend (possibly from this mistaken interpretation of the name) holds that the area was home to a monastery built by Saint Pyr in 513, although there is no concrete evidence of its existence. Another suggestion for the name's origin is that it was called "Bach ynys" meaning "small island", and the "b" turned into an "m" (Bachynys-Machynys) which is not unusual in Welsh (e.g. benyw = woman; also menyw), although once again this would be a most unusual compound form (i.e. 'bach' as a first element) and so this interpretation is also unlikely. The University of Wales Dictionary states that the first element is "ma" (= plain, flat area), as in Machynlleth and Mathafarn. Another local legend claims that a saint from this area pleaded to Aergol Lawhir from Dyfed for assistance in battle against a rival king from the neighbouring Glywysing and was awarded the inheritance of the area into his Kingdom, it is further assumed from its name that Machynys was once an island, at least at high tide. It was shown as an island on a map of the Stepney Estate as late as 1761.

Until the mid-19th century a single farm occupied the site, but after the inclosure acts enabled common land to be developed, industrial development began at Machynys with the digging of clay and the opening of the first of three brickworks. The row of cottages known as "Brick Row" was probably built then. After the tinplate industry got underway at Kidwelly and Llanelli, a tinplate works was built at Machynys in 1872 that became known as the "South Wales Works". Two other tinplate works opened on the peninsular in 1910 and 1912 and workers housing was built. The tinplate was mostly exported to America.

Machynys Peninsula Golf Club

In 1951, a huge new tinplate factory was opened at Trostre on the other side of Llanelli. The Machynys factories could not compete and closed by 1961. Many of the workers moved to Trostre, their houses and the tinplate works were demolished. For many years the site remained largely derelict awaiting abortive regeneration plans.

The site has been transformed beyond recognition since 1960. It is now home to the Machynys Peninsula Golf Club which hosted the Wales Ladies Championship of Europe from 2005 to 2008. To the west of the golf course lies a recent development, Nicklaus Village (Welsh: Pentre Nicklaus), that consists of 175 New England style homes. Machynys is part of the Welsh Assembly Government's Llanelli Waterside regeneration plan.

The Llanelli Millennium Coastal Park, which includes National Cycle Network route 4, runs along the coast of Machynys. There are scenic views of the Gower Peninsula and the Bury Estuary from along the coast. Machynys Ponds, a Site of Special Scientific Interest notable for its dragonfly population, is immediately to the east of the village of Machynys.
