= Llanelli =

Town and community in Carmarthenshire, Wales

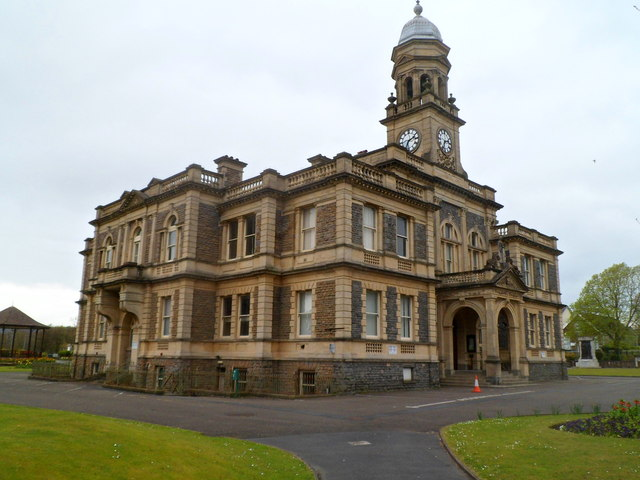
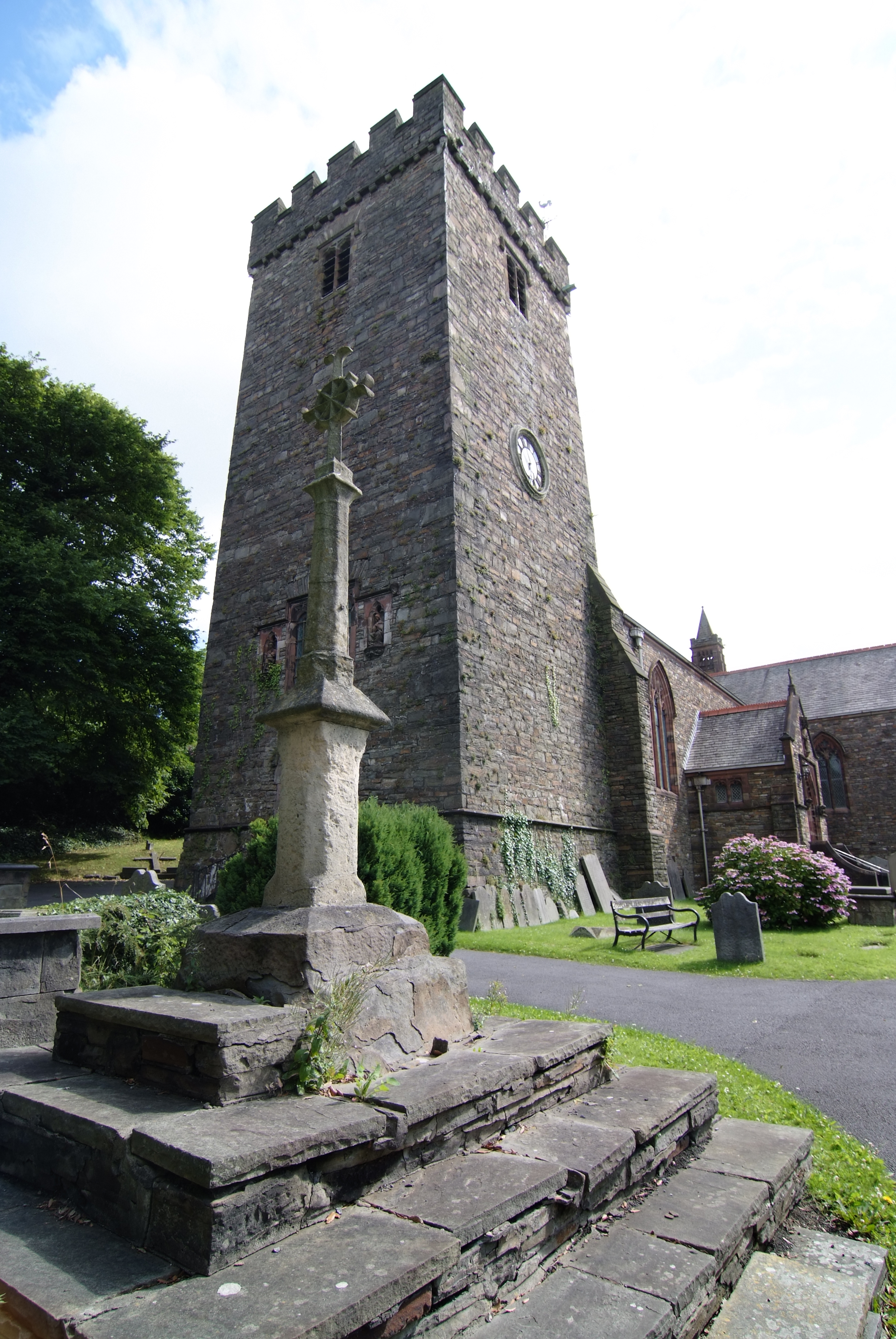
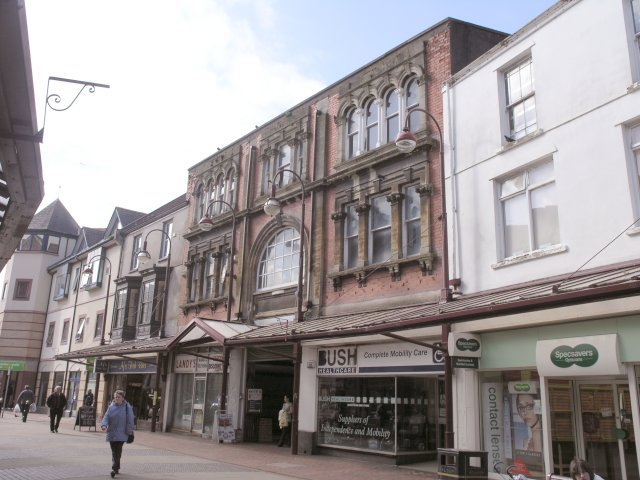
- From the top, Llanelli Town Hall, St Ellyw's Church, Stepney street Arcade

- Location within Carmarthenshire
- Population: 25,366 (Community, 2021); 42,155 (Built up area, 2021)
- OS grid reference: SN505005
- Community: Llanelli
- Principal area: Carmarthenshire
- Preserved county: Dyfed
- Country: Wales
- Sovereign state: United Kingdom
- Post town: LLANELLI
- Postcode district: SA14, SA15
- Dialling code: 01554
- Police: Dyfed-Powys
- Fire: Mid and West Wales
- Ambulance: Welsh
- UK Parliament: Llanelli
- Senedd Cymru – Welsh Parliament: Llanelli
- Website: llanellitowncouncil.co.uk
- List of places UK Wales Carmarthenshire 51.684°N 4.163°W Map of the community

Llanelli (Welsh for 'St Elli's Parish'; Welsh: [ɬaˈnɛɬi]) is a market town and community in Carmarthenshire and the preserved county of Dyfed, Wales. It is on the estuary of the River Loughor and is the largest town in the county of Carmarthenshire.

The town is 11 miles (18 km) north-west of Swansea and 12 miles (19 km) south-east of Carmarthen. At the 2021 census, the community had a population of 25,366, and the built up area had a population of 42,155. The local authority was Llanelli Borough Council when the county of Dyfed existed, and it has been under Carmarthenshire County Council since 1996.

== Toponymy ==
The anglicised spelling "Llanelly" was used until 1966, when it was changed to Llanelli after a local public campaign. It remains in the name of a local historic building, Llanelly House, and this is sometimes confused with the village and parish of Llanelly, in south-east Wales near Abergavenny.

Llanelly in Victoria, Australia, was named after the town of Llanelli, using the spelling current at that time.

== History ==
The beginnings of Llanelli can be found on the lands of present-day Parc Howard. An Iron Age hill fort once stood which was called Bryn-Caerau (hill of the forts). Evidence suggests there were five hill forts from Old Road to the Dimpath. During the Roman conquest of Wales, it is unknown whether the area of Llanelli was part of the Silures tribe or the Demetae tribe. There is evidence of a Roman camp near St Elli shopping centre. It is unknown when it was built, and it was completely abandoned shortly after construction either due to the Romans thinking the area was completely worthless or due to a raid by either rebellious local Britons or an Irish raid. During the post-Roman period, the area of Llanelli may have been heavily populated with Pagans as there's evidence of a pagan worship temple under the Saint Elli church, it may have had frequent raids from Brycheiniog and Dyfed in order to Christianise the area to which it would eventually fall into Dyfed. During the early medieval period, it is said a saint named Elli, or Ellyw, who in legend is the son or daughter of King Brychan established a church on the banks of the Afon Lliedi. The original church would have been a wooden or partly stone, thatched structure. According to early Welsh transcripts, the church of Carnwyllion, i.e. the mother church of the cwmwd, was at Llanelli. The current St Elli's Church dates from the 14th century although extensive restorations were completed in 1911.

According to the Red Book of Hergest during the Norman invasion of Wales, Rhys Ieuanc and his uncle Maelgwn ap Rhys took the allegiance of all the Welsh of the Kingdom of Dyfed apart from one region. Cemais would not pay allegiance and thus Rhys Ieuanc and his uncle, Maelgwn ap Rhys, attacked and pillaged the area moving on to attack the castles at Narberth and Maenclochog. At this time, Rhys Ieuanc moved against Cedweli and Carnwyllion with his forces besieging and burning Carnwyllion Castle in 1215.

Llanelli was industrialised in the early 19th century as the global centre for tinplate production. Lying near the Western fringe of the South Wales Coal Field, Llanelli played an important role in industry, with coal exported through three small docks along with the copper and tin produced within the town itself. Although Llanelli is not located within the South Wales valleys, coal from the Gwendraeth and the Loughor Valleys was transported to Llanelli for export. The Stepney Family and other prominent families (including the Raby family, Howard family and Cowell family), played an important role in the development of the town. Aside from industry, Llanelli is also renowned for its pottery, which has a unique cockerel hand-painted on each item. A collection of this pottery can be seen at the Llanelli Museum in Parc Howard.

Llanelli people are sometimes nicknamed "Turks". There are several theories on this nickname: Llanelli allowed the docking of a Turkish ship when Swansea dockers were on strike in the 1920s, Llanelli tinplate workers wrapped their heads like turbans to deal with sweat, or it is a reference to the 4th Battalion of the Welch Regiment fighting against the Ottoman Empire in the Middle Eastern theatre of World War I.

The built-up area, as defined by the Office for National Statistics, extends beyond the Llanelli community to include parts of the neighbouring Llanelli Rural community.

In March 2024, the Llanelli Chamber of Trade and Commerce, supported by the Llanelli Town Council and MP Nia Griffith, officially launched a campaign to seek city status for Llanelli. Advocates emphasized the bid as an opportunity to promote local culture, and attract economic investment.

== Culture and language ==
=== National Eisteddfod ===
Llanelli hosted the National Eisteddfod six times between 1895 and 2014.

=== Welsh language ===
In the mid-20th century, Llanelli was the world's largest town in which more than half the inhabitants spoke a Celtic language. It is ranked as the seventh largest urban area in Wales. According to the 2011 UK Census returns, 23.7 per cent of Llanelli town residents habitually spoke Welsh. However, the area around Llanelli is a Welsh stronghold, in which 56 per cent do so in communities such as Llwynhendy and Burry Port.

During the 1950s, Trefor and Eileen Beasley campaigned to get Llanelli Rural Council to distribute tax papers in Welsh by refusing to pay taxes until their demand was met. The council reacted by sending in the bailiffs and selling their furniture to recover the money owed. The Beasleys finally won their campaign in 1960 when the council published bilingual rate demands.

== Economy ==
In 1991, Llanelli was a distinct travel to work area, but a 2001-based revision has merged it into a wider one of Swansea Bay.

=== Manufacture ===
Several firms, including Tata Steel Europe tinplate at Trostre and Dyfed Steels, are based in the Llanelli area and service the automotive industry. The Technium Performance Engineering Centre was developed at Llanelli Gate as a business incubator for businesses in the automotive, motor sport and aerospace sectors.

The traditional industries of Llanelli have gradually declined in recent decades. Local government has responded by seeking to attract tourism with developments such as the Machynys Golf Course, retail parks at Trostre and Pemberton, and the Millennium Coastal Park. The core shopping area has now moved largely from the town centre to the Trostre/Pemberton area.

=== Brewing ===
The longstanding Felinfoel Brewery is in Felinfoel, just outside the town.

James Buckley was an ordained Methodist minister, born in Oldham, Lancashire in 1770, who after moving to Llanelli towards the end of the 18th century became involved in establishing a small brewery. After the death of the owner, Buckley gained possession of the brewery and changed its name to Buckley's. In 1998, the brewery was bought by Brains Brewery, which transferred production to its facility in Cardiff. Brains produces The Reverend James, a bitter named after Buckley. Since then, the Llanelli brewery has been partly demolished.

=== Leisure and tourism ===
Developments include the Llanelli Scarlets rugby stadium, the Old Castle Works leisure village (see below) and a National Hunt racecourse at Ffos Las near Trimsaran. Machynys Ponds, a Site of Special Scientific Interest notable for its dragonfly population, lies a mile to the south.

== Religion ==
=== Church in Wales ===
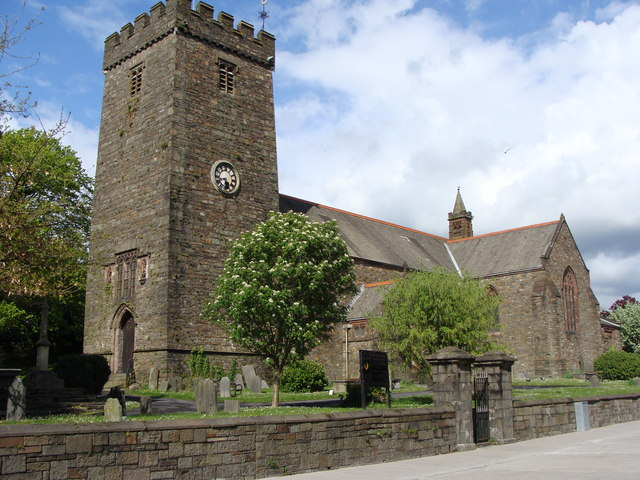
St Elli's Parish Church, Church in Wales.

The parish church of St Elli has a medieval tower. The body of the church was rebuilt by G. F. Bodley in 1905–1906. It is a Grade II* listed building. Several other churches in the town are also listed buildings, but made redundant by the Church in Wales and now in private ownership. They include All Saints' and St Alban's.

=== Nonconformism ===
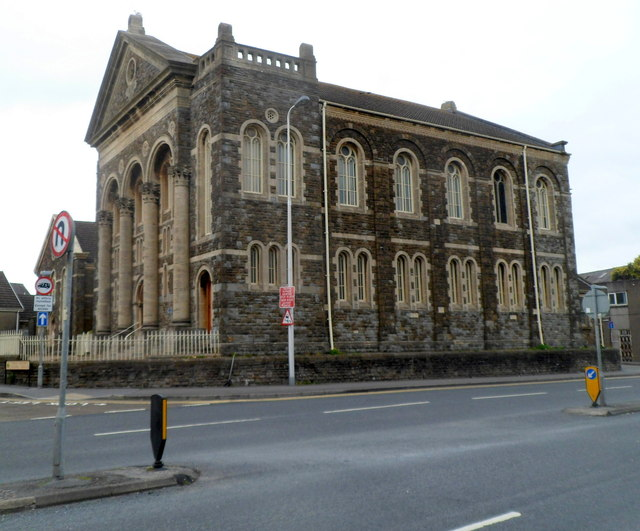
Tabernacle Chapel

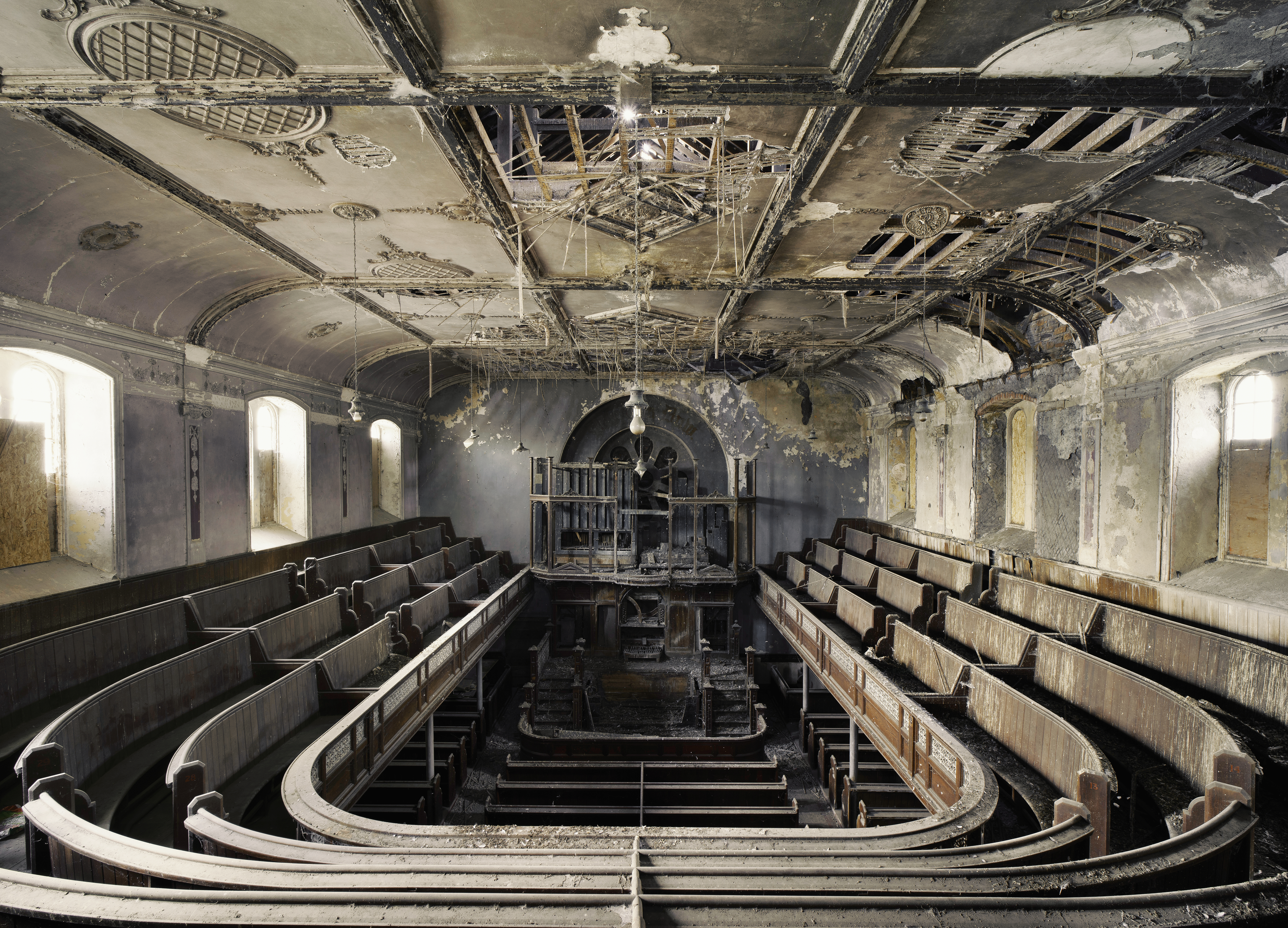
The interior of the Grade II listed Calfaria Baptist Chapel, which was built in 1881

From the early 19th to late 20th centuries, Llanelli was a major centre of Welsh nonconformism. At the end of the Second World War there were 22 chapels in the town. The history of the chapels has been chronicled in a book by the former BBC journalist Huw Edwards. Edwards noted that many of the chapels had closed and others were in sharp decline, he suggested that if the decline continued, only two or three were likely to survive as functioning chapels in the 2020s.

The best-known of Llanelli's chapels is probably Capel Als, where David Rees was a minister for many years in the 19th century. Llanelli had seven other Independent (Congregationalist) chapels, namely Tabernacle, Lloyd Street, Siloah now closed, Soar now closed, Ebenezer, Dock Chapel, and Park Church (the only chapel where services were conducted in English). The Tabernacle Chapel built in 1872–1873 by John Humphreys of Morriston overlooks the Town Hall. There is a prominent four-pillared Corinthian arcade at the entrance. The building was Grade II* listed in December 1992. It is used as a venue by the Llanelli Choral Society. Other listed chapels include Bethel Baptist Chapel in Copperworks Road, Park Congregational Chapel, Zion Baptist Chapel at Island Place, and Hall Street Methodist Church. Calfaria Baptist Chapel, built in 1881, is Grade II listed.

Situated on Waunlanyrafon, across the road from the police station, is the Roman Catholic Church, Our Lady Queen of Peace Church.

Llanelli has an Islamic centre on Station Road and Baptist churches spread throughout the town and surrounding areas.

== Sport ==
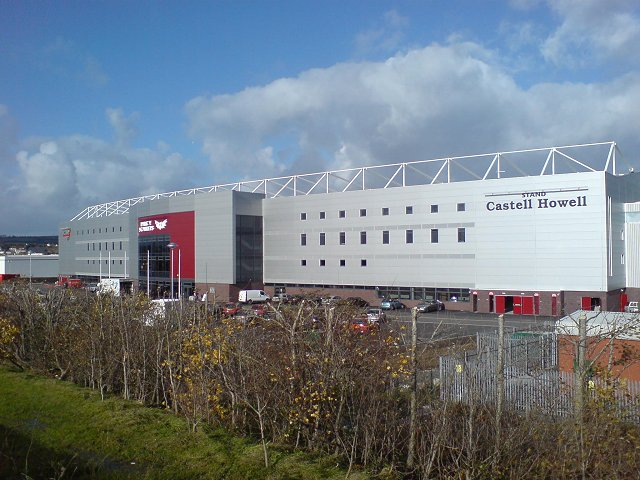
Parc y Scarlets

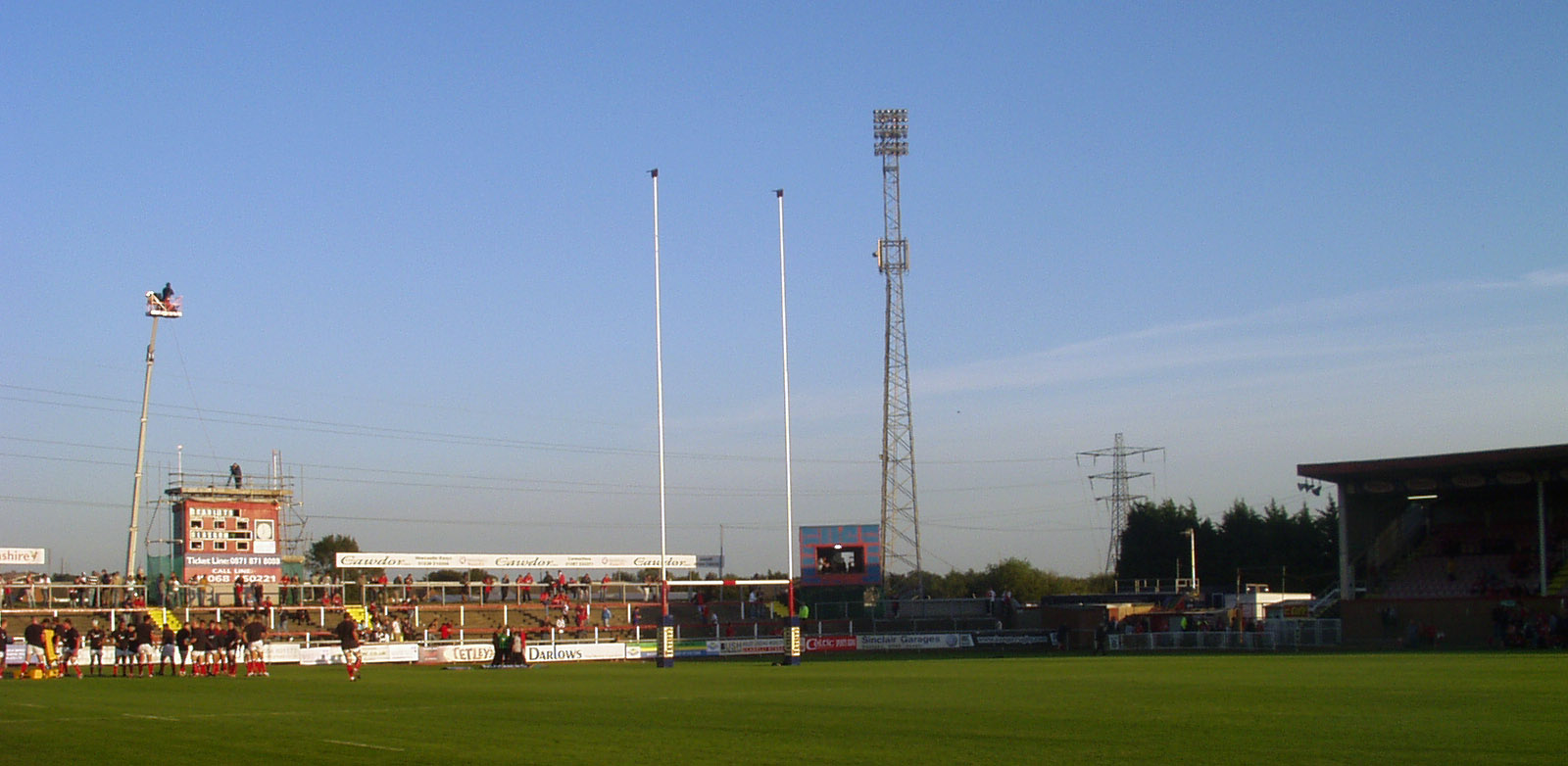
Stradey Park

=== Rugby union ===
The town's rugby union teams – the Scarlets, who compete in the United Rugby Championship, and Llanelli RFC in the Welsh Premiership – play at Parc y Scarlets, which opened in November 2008 in Pemberton. Previously they had played at Stradey Park, home to Llanelli RFC for over 130 years and one venue used for the 1999 Rugby World Cup, hosting the match between Argentina and Samoa on 10 October 1999.

The Welsh folk song "Sosban Fach" (Little Saucepan) is mostly associated with Llanelli RFC.

Many rugby clubs have notable scalps collected from touring international sides but Llanelli has in its rugby history one of the greatest scalps ever. On 31 October 1972, in one of the most famous results in rugby union history, Llanelli beat the New Zealand national team 9–3 in front of around 20,000 spectators. Llanelli centre Roy Bergiers scored the only try of the game, charging down a clearance by All Black scrum-half Lin Colling after a penalty from Phil Bennett rebounded back into play off the crossbar.

There is a strong junior rugby core, including club sides such as Felinfoel, New Dock Stars, Llangennech and the Llanelli Wanderers. In 2005, Coedcae School won the Inter-Schools Cup of Wales with an 8–5 victory over Brynteg Comprehensive.

=== Rugby league ===
Llanelli's West Wales Raiders play in RFL League 1, the third tier of rugby league in England and Wales. The club is based at Stebonheath Park.

=== Association football ===
Stebonheath Park is the home of football club Llanelli A.F.C., which plays in the Cymru Premier, the top tier of Welsh football. The town has many active local teams and tournaments such as the 2018 Challenge Cup, where West End United beat Trostre Sports AFC.

=== Bowls ===
Llanelli hosts the annual Llanelli Open Bowls Tournaments, the oldest and most prestigious of which, the Roberts-Rolfe Open Singles event, has been run since 1926 and has a first prize of £600. The contests are held from July to September in Parc Howard.

=== Golf ===
The Llanelli area has two golf courses: the Machynys Peninsula Golf & Country Club which hosted the Wales Ladies Championship of Europe from 2005 until 2008, and Glyn Abbey Golf Club, which was named Welsh Golf Club of the Year 2009.

=== Snooker ===
Llanelli is the birthplace and home of Terry Griffiths OBE (1947–2024), snooker world champion in 1979 and runner-up in 1988. Later a coach and snooker commentator, he ran the Terry Griffiths Matchroom in the town centre. Also born in a village just North of the town was Eirian Williams (b.1955), four-time Snooker World Championship Final Referee together with over 30 other Professional Snooker ranking finals.

== Media ==
Llanelli is home to Tinopolis, one of the largest independent media producers in the United Kingdom. It has subsidiaries that produce over 2,500 hours of broadcast television, including English language programmes such as Question Time for the BBC and Welsh-language television programs such as Wedi 7 for S4C.

Coverage of local affairs appears in two papers, the Llanelli Star founded in 1909 and Llanelli Herald launched in 2015. Online coverage is found on Llanelli Online. The main county-wide radio station is Radio Carmarthenshire. Other radio stations covering the area are Hits Radio South Wales, its sister station Greatest Hits Radio South Wales, Swansea Bay Radio, Radio BGM, which serves the Prince Philip Hospital and the local community online, and Heart South Wales.

=== Local attractions ===
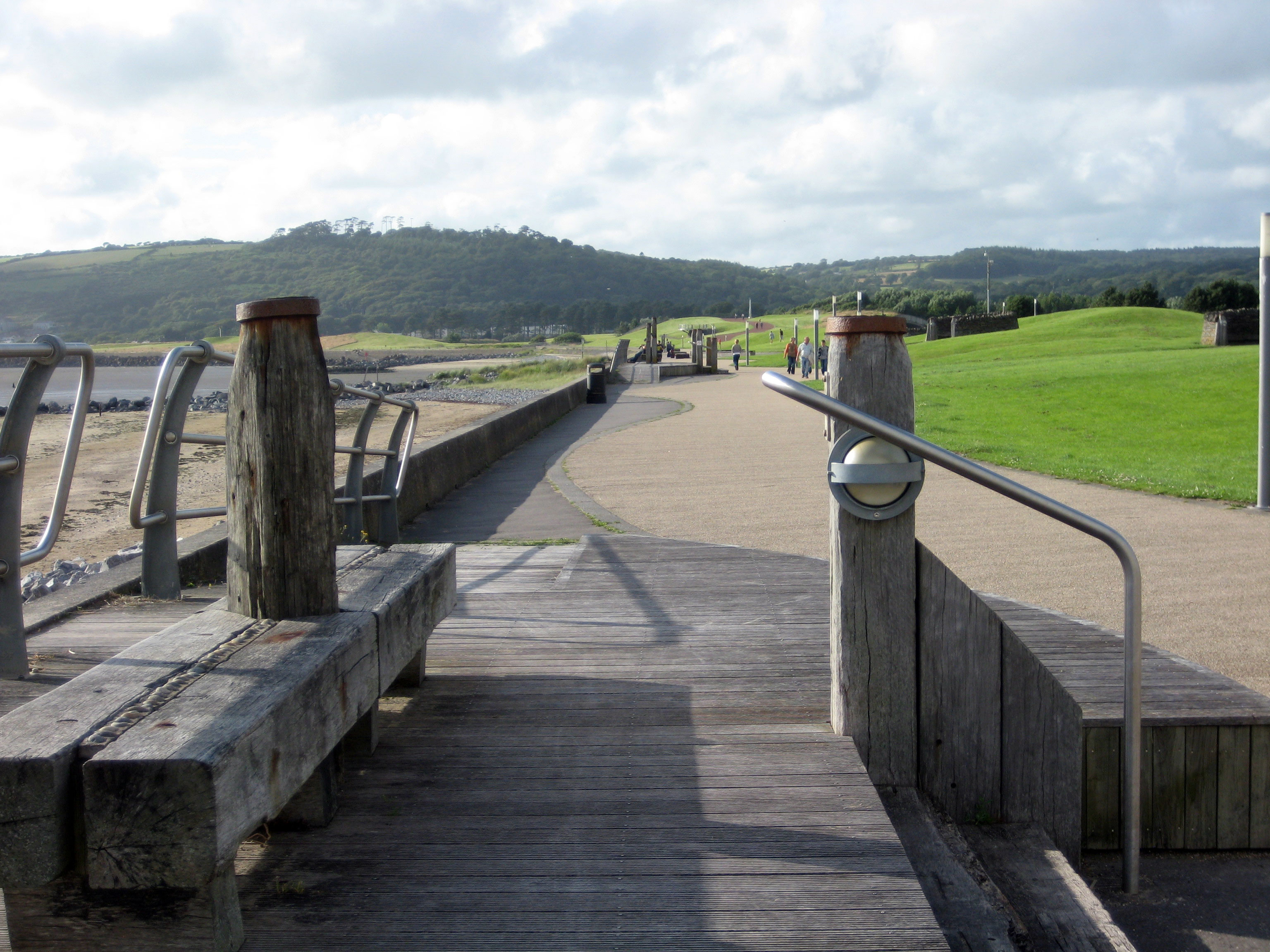
Millennium Coastal Path near Llanelli

Some local attractions include:

- The Millennium Coastal Path along 13 miles (21 km) of coastline from Loughor to Pembrey offers views of the Gower Peninsula and the opportunity of traffic-free cycling.
- WWT Llanelli Wetland Centre, about 1-mile (1.6 km) east of Llanelli, near Llwynhendy and Bynea, is one of ten wetland nature reserves managed by the Wildfowl and Wetlands Trust.
- Llanelly House is an example of an early 18th-century Georgian town house. Located directly opposite the parish church, having been in a poor state of repair, was bought by the town council and restored. It was built for Thomas Stepney, the Member of Parliament (MP) for Carmarthenshire, in 1714. John Wesley, the early leader of the Methodist movement, stayed there several times. It also featured in the first series of the BBC television show, Restoration.
- Parc Howard Museum is set in the grounds of Parc Howard. The museum houses a collection of Llanelly Pottery (so spelt), an art collection and material on the history of the town.

=== Leisure ===
The Ffwrnes Theatre opened in late 2012, replacing the Theatr Elli, which was part of the Llanelli Entertainment Centre. A multi-screen cinema opened in October 2012. Much is being spent on regenerating the central shopping district.

Llanelli holds festivals, carnivals and events throughout the year. They include:

- Into the Future Festival — educational event about the environment and technology, organised by the county council (August)
- Llanelli Big Day Out — pop and live music event (August)
- Llanelli Beer Festival — official CAMRA event (August)

== Transport ==
The Llanelli railway station is on the Great Western Crescent south of the town centre.

Llanelli is connected to the National Cycle Network from the north on NCR 43, and along the coast from the east and west on NCR 4. These routes link with a cycle path to the town centre.

The nearest passenger airport is Cardiff Airport, 50 miles (80 km) away, and Pembrey, 2 miles (3.2 km), provides air charter services.

== Healthcare ==
The foundation stone for the Llanelli General Hospital was laid in 1884 and the hospital opened in 1885. The children's ward was decorated with Royal Doulton nursery rhyme tiles. The tiles were commissioned by Mrs H.C. Buckley in memory of her husband Dr Henry Child Buckley who was the Medical Officer of Health of Llanelli. The Mynydd Mawr Hospital was built as an isolation hospital and closed in 2013. The Prince Philip Hospital, which replaced the General Hospital and Mynydd Mawr, was constructed during the 1980s.

== Education ==
=== Primary and secondary ===
The first Welsh-medium primary school, Ysgol Gymraeg Dewi Sant, was founded in Llanelli in 1947. The English-medium secondary schools are St John Lloyd, Bryngwyn and Coedcae; the only Welsh medium secondary school is Ysgol y Strade. St Michael's School is a private school for ages 3–18. Ysgol Heol Goffa is a special school for pupils with disabilities.

=== Further and higher education ===
Coleg Sir Gâr (Carmarthenshire College), with its main campus at Graig near Pwll, provides a college education for most of the town's further education students and some vocational undergraduate degrees through the University of Wales. There are sixth form colleges at Ysgol Gyfun y Strade (Welsh medium) and St Michael's (English medium).

Prince Philip Hospital has a postgraduate centre for medical training run by Cardiff University's School of Postgraduate Medical and Dental Education.

== Governance ==
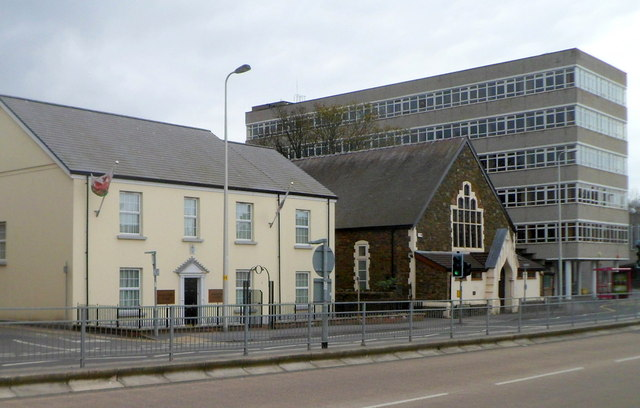
The Old Vicarage (left): Headquarters of Llanelli Town Council

There are two tiers of local government covering Llanelli, at community (town) and county level: Llanelli Town Council (Cyngor Tref Llanelli) and Carmarthenshire County Council (Cyngor Sir Gâr). The town council is based at the Old Vicarage on Town Hall Square. Carmarthenshire County Council also has offices in the town, at Ty Elwyn on Town Hall Square, and a customer service centre at 36 Stepney Street.

Some of the built up area extends into the neighbouring community of Llanelli Rural, which has a separate community council. The community of Llanelli is bordered by those of Llanelli Rural, Llanrhidian Higher and Llanrhidian Lower, the last two being across the Loughor Estuary in the City and County of Swansea.

The town forms part of the Llanelli parliamentary constituency, currently represented by Nia Griffith MP of the Labour Party. The Llanelli Senedd constituency is represented by Labour's Lee Waters MS.

=== Administrative history ===
Llanelli was an ancient parish, which covered the town and surrounding rural areas. The parish was subdivided into five hamlets: Berwick, Glyn, Hêngoed, Westfa and a Llanelli hamlet, also known as the borough hamlet, covering the town itself. The borough hamlet was administered as a borough by the 17th century, run by a corporation led by a portreeve. A government survey of boroughs in 1835 found that the borough corporation had no official charter and very few powers. The borough was therefore left unreformed when the Municipal Corporations Act 1835 reformed most ancient boroughs across the country into municipal boroughs.

In order to provide more modern forms of local government, the borough hamlet was made a local board district in 1850, run by an elected local board. The board was given the property of the old borough corporation, which then ceased to function. Local board districts were converted into urban districts under the Local Government Act 1894. The 1894 Act also directed that civil parishes could no longer straddle district boundaries, and so the part of Llanelli parish outside the urban district was made a separate parish called Llanelli Rural.

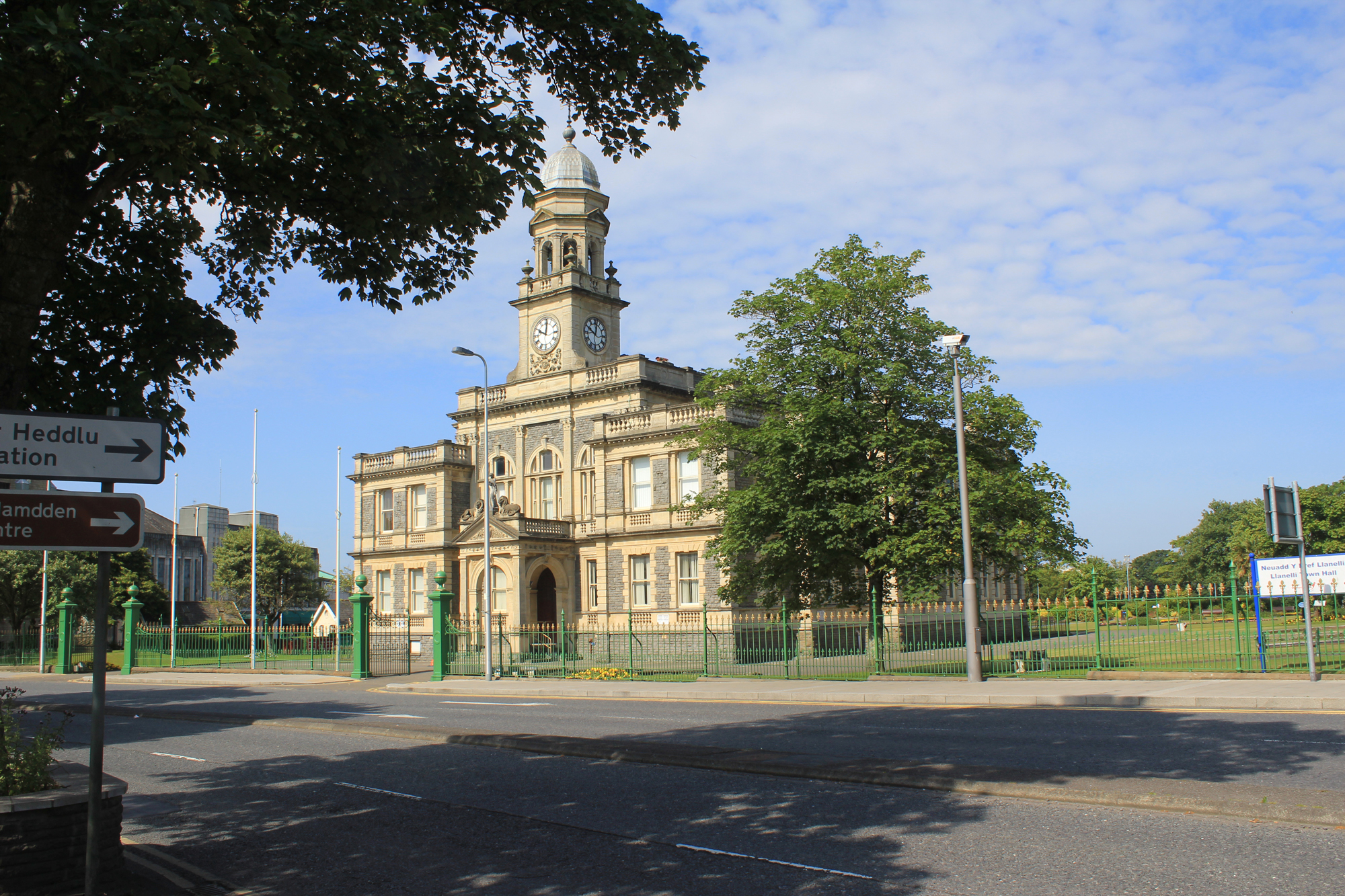
Llanelli Town Hall

Llanelli Town Hall was completed in 1896 to serve as the urban district council's headquarters. Llanelly Urban District was upgraded to a municipal borough in 1913. The official spelling of the borough's name was Llanelly until 1966 when it was changed to Llanelli.

The municipal borough of Llanelli was abolished in 1974 under the Local Government Act 1972. A community called Llanelli was created covering the area of the former borough, with its community council taking the name Llanelli Town Council. District-level functions passed to the new Llanelli Borough Council, which covered surrounding rural areas and nearby towns as well as Llanelli itself. Carmarthenshire County Council was abolished as part of the same reforms, with county-level functions passing to the new Dyfed County Council. The borough of Llanelli and county of Dyfed were both abolished in 1996 and their councils' functions passed to a re-established Carmarthenshire County Council.

=== Twinning ===
Llanelli is twinned with Agen, France.

=== Town areas ===
- Bigyn
- Glanymôr
- Llannerch
- Machynys
- Morfa
- Tyisha
- New Dock
- Sandy
- Stradey

== Notable people ==
See Category:People from Llanelli

Notable Llanelli people with a Wikipedia page in alphabetical order by section:

=== Art, media and entertainment ===
- Juliet Ace (1938–2025), playwright and dramatist
- Simon Armstrong (living), film, television and stage actor
- David Brazell (1875–1959), opera singer and early recording artist
- Ronald Cass (1923–2006), film writer and composer
- Eleanor Daniels (1886–1994), stage and silent film actress
- Huw Edwards (born 1961), former BBC News chief presenter
- Cerith Wyn Evans (born 1958) conceptual artist, sculptor and film-maker
- Jessica Garlick (born 1981), Eurovision Song Contest 2002 UK entrant and Pop Idol finalist
- Gareth Hughes (1894–1965), silent film actor, born in Halfway/Pemberton
- Julie Gore (born 1958), singer, songwriter, TV presenter and darts player
- James Dickson Innes (1887–1914), artist
- Deke Leonard (1944–2017), rock musician, author, raconteur and TV panellist
- Elizabeth Morgan (born 1930), actress and writer
- Terry Morris (born 1965), artist and photographer
- John Owen-Jones (born 1971), actor
- Christopher Rees (born 1973), singer, songwriter and musician
- Rachel Roberts (1927–1980), actress
- Dorothy Squires (1915–1998), singer and second wife of actor Roger Moore
- Donald Swann (1923–1994), of the Flanders and Swann duo
- Huw Thomas (1927–2009), ITN newscaster
- Imogen Thomas (born 1982), Big Brother contestant and glamour model
- Jeffrey Thomas (born 1945), acting star of Hercules: The Legendary Journeys and Spartacus: Gods of the Arena

=== Public service ===
- Robert Buckland (born 1968), Conservative Lord Chancellor
- Leslie Griffiths (born 1942), Methodist minister and life peer
- Michael Howard (born 1941), Conservative Party leader (2003–2005)
- Elwyn Jones, Baron Elwyn-Jones (1909–1989), Labour Lord Chancellor
- William Lloyd (1725–1796), Royal Navy admiral
- Gwladys Yvonne McKeon (1897–1979), Llanelli-born Australian marine biologist
- Sir Tom O'Brien (1900–1970), Labour MP and trade unionist
- Rod Richards (1947–2019), Conservative MP and leader in the National Assembly for Wales
- Sir John Stepney, 8th Baronet (1743–1811), a Welsh MP from 1767 to 1788.
- David Thomas (1880–1967), Labour organizer and trade unionist
- Sir John Meurig Thomas (1932–2020), chemist and science historian
- Brian Trubshaw (1924–2001), pilot of first flight of British Concorde
- Phil Prosser (living), British army brigadier, Commander of 101 Logistics Brigade in charge of COVID-19 vaccine roll-out

=== Sports ===
==== Rugby Union ====
- Phil Bennett (1948–2022), Wales and British Lions
- Jonathan Davies (born 1962), Wales in rugby league and rugby union
- Ieuan Evans (born 1964), Wales and British Lions
- Ray Gravell (1951–2007), Wales and British Lions, actor and broadcaster.
- Carwyn James (1929–1983), Wales, coach of Llanelli and British Lions
- Gareth Jenkins (born 1951), Wales, coach of Llanelli, Llanelli Scarlets and Wales
- Barry John (1945–2024), Cardiff, Wales and British Lions
- Dwayne Peel (born 1981), Wales and British Lions
- Derek Quinnell (born 1949), Wales and British Lions

==== Association football ====
- Wyndham Evans (born 1951), player, manager and commentator
- Emyr Huws (born 1993), Wales and Ipswich Town F.C.
- Matthew Jones (born 1980), Wales and premier league footballer and manager
- Kyle Letheren (born 1987), Plymouth Argyle F.C. goalkeeper
- Byron Stevenson (1956–2007), Wales

==== Other sports ====
- Jonny Clayton (born 1974), professional dart player
- Jeff Evans (born 1954), cricket umpire
- Dai Greene (born 1986), 400m hurdler, world champion and IAAF gold medalist
- Terry Griffiths (1947–2024), world snooker champion (1979)
- Neil Haddock (born 1964), boxer, British superfeatherweight champion
- Evan Hoyt (born 1995), professional tennis
- Edward Laverack (born 1994), professional cyclist
- Flex Lewis (born 1983), bodybuilder
- Melbourne Tierney (1923–2014), rugby league
- Eirian Williams (born 1955), snooker referee

== See also ==
- Listed buildings in Llanelli
- Llanelli riots of 1911
- Llanelly power station
- 1894–1913 Llanelly Urban District Council elections
- 1913–1939 Llanelly Borough Council elections
