= 1913–1939 Llanelly Borough Council elections =

Welsh local government elections

Llanelly Borough Council was created in 1913 when the existing Llanelly Urban District Council was granted full borough status.

== 1913 Llanelly Borough Council election ==
The first election for the newly incorporated borough of Llanelly was held on 3 November 1913. All the seats were contested with the majority of the members of the former Urban District Council being elected. Apart from the nine candidates nominated by the Labour Association - three in each ward - the election was said to have been fought on non-political and non-sectarian lines, with the majority of the aspirants standing as Independents.

=== Ward One ===
Ward One 1913
Party	Candidate	Votes	%	±%
Labour	W.H. Samuel*	897		
Independent	Joseph Roberts	865		
Independent	Roland T. Thomas*	827		
Independent	Gwilym R. Price*	824		
Independent	David Jennings	779		
Labour	John Simlett*	632		
Independent	W.E. Clements	628		
Independent	James Hansard	593		
Labour	William Vivian	560		
Independent	W.T. Davies	534		
Independent	William Davies	447		

=== Ward Two ===
Ward Two 1913
Party	Candidate	Votes	%	±%
Independent	D.J. Davies*	1,048		
Independent	E. Willis Jones*	1,009		
Independent	Thomas Jones*	984		
Independent	W.B. Jones*	939		
Independent	D.R. Jones	888		
Independent	T. Hay Samuel	742		
Independent	Dan Williams	687		
Independent	J. Thomas	674		
Labour	G.H. Stacey	664		
Independent	D. Davies	540		
Labour	Sam Jones	530		
Independent	J. Lewis Phillips	424		
Labour	T.H. Evans	366		

=== Ward Three ===
Ward Three 1913
Party	Candidate	Votes	%	±%
Independent	Herbert D. Rees*	601		
Independent	W.P. Rees	538		
Labour	Nathan Griffiths*	444		
Independent	J.W. Thomas	432		
Independent	J.L. Jones	347		
Labour	John Hughes	345		
Independent	Owen Jones	342		
Labour	Morgan Morgan*	332		
Independent	W.M. Davies*	325		
Independent	S.H. Bevan	295		

=== By-elections ===
At the inaugural statutory meeting of the new council on Monday, 10 November, presided over by the new mayor, Sir Stafford Howard, six aldermen were elected (two from each ward) resulting in by-elections for the remaining six seats on the council. D. James Davies, John Simlett and Herbert Rees were elected aldermen for six years, and Joseph Roberts, Bramwell Jones and Nathan Griffiths for three years.

The by-elections were held on 25 November, with five of the seats being won by Independent candidates.

=== Ward One by-election (two seats) ===
Ward One by-election 1913
Party	Candidate	Votes	%	±%
Independent	W.E. Clement	800		
Independent	W.T. Davies	699		
Labour	William Vivian	661		
Labour	P. Williams	276		

=== Ward Two (two seats) ===
Ward Two by-elections 1913
Party	Candidate	Votes	%	±%
Independent	D. Williams	622		
Independent	John Thomas	599		
Labour	G.H. Stacey	564		
Independent	D. Davies	541		
Independent	J. Lewis Phillips	293		
Independent	T. Harris	163		
Independent	J. Davies	125		

=== Ward Three (two seats) ===
Ward Three by-elections 1913
Party	Candidate	Votes	%	±%
Labour	Morgan Morgan	400		
Independent	William Davies	339		
Labour	Owen Jones	322		
Independent	H. Williams	297		
Independent	W. Davies	285		

== 1919 Llanelly Borough Council election ==
In the first post-war election, Labour candidates won four of the six seats, three of which were gains from Independent candidates. The Llanelly Mercury expressed the hope that the infusion of new blood would lead to an improvement in the govrnamce of the town.

=== Ward One (two seats) ===
Ward One 1919
Party	Candidate	Votes	%	±%
Labour	Evan Roberts	1,068		
Independent	Martin R. Richards*	979		
Independent	Frank J. Rees*	945		
Labour	David Williams	744		
Independent	John Llewellyn	405		
Independent	John Marker	409		
Independent	Alicia Phillips	321		

=== Ward Two (two seats) ===
Ward Two 1919
Party	Candidate	Votes	%	±%
Labour	Thomas Charles	1,779		
Discharged Soldiers and Sailors	Capt. J. Evans	1,491		
Labour	Thomas Davies	1,267		
Independent	W.T. Morris	667		

=== Ward Three (two seats) ===
Ward Three 1919
Party	Candidate	Votes	%	±%
Labour	Owen Jones	873		
Labour	H. Steve Davies	781		
Independent	William Davies*	653		
Independent	J.W. Thomas*	258		

== 1920 Llanelly Borough Council election ==
Due to the postponement of elections during the war years, this was the first occasion when aldermen stood down and sought re-election. Two retiring aldermen, namely E. Willis Jones and the maverick former Labour councillor, Nathan Griffiths, were both defeated, as was the retiring mayor, Daniel Williams. Labour gained both seats in Ward Two, where two retiring Independents also lost their seats. The Mercury regretted the apparent lack of interest shown by the ratepayers.

=== Ward One (two seats) ===
Ward One 1920
Party	Candidate	Votes	%	±%
Independent	W.E. Clement*	1,179		
Independent	R.P. Thomas*	1,072		
Independent	Oliver Russell	879		
Labour	Thomas Evans	689		
Independent	Mrs Burn	413		

=== Ward Two (two seats) ===
Ward Two 1920
Party	Candidate	Votes	%	±%
Labour	Elias Davies	1,373		
Labour	James Davies	1,370		
Independent	E. Willis Jones**	1,114		
Independent	Daniel Williams*	948		
Independent	Thomas Davies*	546		

=== Ward Three (two seats) ===
Ward Three 1920
Party	Candidate	Votes	%	±%
Independent	W. Powell Rees	1,401		
Labour	Morgan Morgan*	946		
Labour	Harry Bowen	774		
Independent	Nathan Griffiths**	390		

=== By-elections ===
At the statutory meeting on 9 November, R.P. Thomas, D.R. Jones and J.L. Jones were elected aldermen. At the ensuing by-elections, all three seats were won by Independents, aided by a split Labour vote in Ward One.

=== Ward 1 by-election (one seat) ===
Ward 1 by-election 1920
Party	Candidate	Votes	%	±%
Independent	Joseph H. Williams	1,127		
Independent Labour	Oliver Russell	910		
Labour	Thomas Evans	659		

=== Ward 2 by-election (one seat) ===
Ward 2 by-election 1920
Party	Candidate	Votes	%	±%
Independent	E. Willis Jones	1,323		
Labour	Thomas H. Evans	875		

=== Ward 3 by-election (one seat) ===
Ward 3 by-election 1920
Party	Candidate	Votes	%	±%
Independent	William Davies	1,100		
Labour	Harry Bowen	748		

== 1921 Llanelly Borough Council election ==
Independent candidates won five of the six seats, including William Davies, who regained the seat he lost in 1919. The Labour Association was criticised for running a slate of candidates and creating costs to the ratepayers.

=== Ward One (two seats) ===
Ward One 1921
Party	Candidate	Votes	%	±%
Independent	David Jennings	1,878		
Independent	Frank J. Rees*	1,809		
Labour	Mrs Elias Davies	581		
Independent	T.L. Stewart	401		
Independent	Llew Arthur	354		

=== Ward Two (two seats) ===
Ward Two 1921
Party	Candidate	Votes	%	±%
Independent	E. Willis Jones*	2,061		
Independent	T. Hay Samuel*	1,644		
Labour	Tom Harries	859		
Independent	G.W. Dillon	712		

=== Ward Three (two seats) ===
Ward Three 1921
Party	Candidate	Votes	%	±%
Independent	William Davies	1,268		
Labour	John Hughes*	923		
Independent	Thomas Morgan	673		
Independent	David John	516		

== 1922 Llanelly Borough Council election ==
Only one of the three wards was contested at this election, which was overshadowed by the ongoing General Election.

=== Ward One (two seats) ===
Ward One 1922
Party	Candidate	Votes	%	±%
Labour	Evan Roberts*	Unopposed		
Independent	Martin R. Richards*	Unopposed		

=== Ward Two (two seats) ===
Ward Two 1922
Party	Candidate	Votes	%	±%
Labour	Thomas Charles*	Unopposed		
Independent	J. Evans*	Unopposed		

=== Ward Three (two seats) ===
Ward Three 1922
Party	Candidate	Votes	%	±%
Labour	H. Steve Davies*	1,094		
Labour	Owen Jones*	1,021		
Independent	David Harries	843		

== 1923 Llanelly Borough Council election ==
The Labour Party launched a campaign to improve their position on the authority and this led to a more politicised campoagn than in previous years. Aldermen also stood down but the death of D. James Davies, former owner of the South Wales Press, left one vacancy. However, only two of the six Labour candidates were elected.

=== Ward One (two seats) ===
Ward One 1923
Party	Candidate	Votes	%	±%
Independent	Joseph Roberts**	1,634		
Independent	W.E. Clement*	1,362		
Labour	Tom Hughes	878		
Independent	R.J. Edmunds	800		
Labour	T.D. Phillips	623		

=== Ward Two (two seats) ===
Ward Two 1923
Party	Candidate	Votes	%	±%
Independent	W.T. Morris	2,021		
Labour	James Davies*	1,709		
Labour	Elias Davies*	1,637		

=== Ward Three (two seats) ===
Ward Three 1923
Party	Candidate	Votes	%	±%
Independent	W. Powell Rees*	1,803		
Labour	Morgan Morgan	901		
Labour	Stanley Davies	825		

== 1924 Llanelly Borough Council election ==
The contest, held at the same time as a General Election campaign, resulted in Labour losing one seat.

=== Ward One (two seats) ===
Ward One 1924
Party	Candidate	Votes	%	±%
Independent	Frank J. Rees*	2,223		
Independent	David Jennings*	1,919		
Labour	R. Phillips	860		

=== Ward Two (two seats) ===
Ward Two 1924
Party	Candidate	Votes	%	±%
Independent	T. Hay Samuel*	1,909		
Labour	Elias Davies*	1,739		
Labour	Ben Griffiths	1,275		

=== Ward Three (two seats) ===
Ward Three 1924
Party	Candidate	Votes	%	±%
Independent	William Davies*	1,247		
Independent	Theo Jenkins	973		
Labour	John Hughes*	873		
Labour	J.J. Winter	552		

== 1925 Llanelly Borough Council election ==
All three wards were contested and local press coverage focused on the more radical elements within the Labour campaign with Enoch Collins being described as an avowed Communist. Th outcome was a net loss of one Labour seat. While Labour held both setas in Ward Three the more moderate Tom Charles was ousted in Ward Two. Press attention locally focused on the defeat of Neft and Collins in Ward One while it was claimed that Charles would have held his seat had he stood as an Independent.

=== Ward One (two seats) ===
Ward One 1925
Party	Candidate	Votes	%	±%
Independent	Daniel Roberts*	2,277		
Independent	Martin R. Richards*	2,120		
Labour	R. Neft	603		
Labour	Enoch Collins	532		

=== Ward Two (two seats) ===
Ward Two 1925
Party	Candidate	Votes	%	±%
Independent	Jack Evans*	1,987		
Independent	W.E. Davies	1,823		
Labour	Thomas Charles*	1,547		
Labour	Ben Griffiths	1,185		

=== Ward Three (two seats) ===
Ward Three 1925
Party	Candidate	Votes	%	±%
Labour	H. Steve Davies*	1,209		
Labour	Owen Jones*	1,146		
Independent	Alban Evans	663		

== 1926 Llanelly Borough Council election ==
All three wards were keenly contested and the Labour Party launched a campaign to improve their position on the authority and this led to a more politicised campaign than in previous years. Aldermen also stood down, including the retiring mayor, J.L. Jones. Much to the surprise of the local press, Labour won four of the six seats with two retiring aldermen and W.T. Morris, a sitting county councillor, among those defeated. J.L. Jones, first elected in 1910, finished at the foot of the poll. There was criticism of Indepdnents for fielding too many candidates and allowing Labour candidates to be elected on a split vote. The practice of expecting retiring aldermen to seek election in competition with retiring councillors was also questioned.

=== Ward One (two seats) ===
Ward One 1926
Party	Candidate	Votes	%	±%
Independent	J.H. Williams*	1,480		
Labour	John Hughes	1,413		
Independent	R.P. Thomas**	1,311		
Independent	W.E. Clement*	1,045		

=== Ward Two (two seats) ===
Ward Two 1926
Party	Candidate	Votes	%	±%
Labour	Tom Charles	2,085		
Independent	Jack Auckland	1,437		
Independent	W.H. Charles	1,338		
Independent	W.T. Morris*	981		

=== Ward Three (two seats) ===
Ward Three 1926
Party	Candidate	Votes	%	±%
Labour	Morgan Morgan	1,094		
Labour	Stanley Davies*	1,013		
Independent	W.J. Davies	687		
Independent	Tom Morgan	600		
Independent	J.L. Jones**	592		

=== By-elections ===
At the statutory meeting on 9 November, David Jennings (Ind), T. Hay Samuel (Ind) and Morgan Morgan (Lab) were elected aldermen, causing by-elections in each ward. The Independents won two of these but the ex-mayor was again defeated in Ward Three.

=== Ward 1 by-election (one seat) ===
Ward 1 by-election 1926
Party	Candidate	Votes	%	±%
Independent	R.P. Thomas			
Labour	W.L. Rees			

=== Ward 2 by-election (one seat) ===
Ward 2 by-election 1926
Party	Candidate	Votes	%	±%
Independent	W.H. Charles			
Labour	D. James Davies			
Independent	T. Griffiths			

=== Ward 3 by-election (one seat) ===
Ward 3 by-election 1926
Party	Candidate	Votes	%	±%
Labour	H.W. Bowen	976		
Independent	J.L. Jones	581		

== 1927 Llanelly Borough Council election ==
Coverage prior to the election suggested that the Labour Association washopeful of winning at least three seats. However, Labour lost the one seat that they held as the Independnets won all six seats. Roland Thomas, who briefly lost his seat the previous year, was among those re-elected.

=== Ward One (two seats) ===
Ward One 1927
Party	Candidate	Votes	%	±%
Independent	Frank J. Rees*	2,370		
Independent	Roland P. Thomas*	1,897		
Labour	W.L. Rees	1,090		

=== Ward Two (two seats) ===
Ward Two 1927
Party	Candidate	Votes	%	±%
Independent	W.H. Charles*	1,872		
Independent	John Williams	1,697		
Labour	Elias Davies*	1,598		
Labour	D. James Davies	1,371		

=== Ward Three (two seats) ===
Ward Three 1927
Party	Candidate	Votes	%	±%
Independent	Theo Jenkins*	1,319		
Independent	William Davies*	1,081		
Labour	W. Jones	705		
Labour	Alf Davies	597		

== 1928 Llanelly Borough Council election ==
All three wards were contested. In Ward One, the two retiring Independent members faced a number of opponents including former Labour councillor Elias Davies and two Independents, Tom Hughes and William Vivian, who had links to the labour movement. In Ward Two,, the two retiring members who had both served since 1919 were opposed by Labour candidates who included the Divisional party's local organizer, Douglas Hughes. Finally, in Ward Three, Labour was defending oth seats but a string Independent challenge was mounted. A self-appointed 'Ratepayers Association' formally supported five non-Labour candidates.. Independents held five seats while in Ward 3, Owen Jones, a Labour councillor for nine years, lost his seat to another Labour candidate.

=== Ward One (two seats) ===
Ward One 1928
Party	Candidate	Votes	%	±%
Independent	Martin R. Richards*	2,122		
Independent	Daniel Roberts*	1,957		
Labour	Elias Davies	945		
Independent	Tom Hughes	855		
Independent	William Vivian	838		
Labour	Harry Rees	591		
Communist	Enoch Collins	96		
Communist	Harry Jones	80		

=== Ward Two (two seats) ===
Ward Two 1928
Party	Candidate	Votes	%	±%
Independent	W.E. Davies*	2,449		
Independent	Jack Evans*	2,432		
Labour	John Hughes	1,377		
Labour	Douglas Hughes	1,341		

=== Ward Three (two seats) ===
Ward Three 1928
Party	Candidate	Votes	%	±%
Independent	W.J. Davies	1,101		
Labour	D. Grant Evans	1,092		
Labour	Owen Jones*	1,085		
Communist	Bryn Jones	113		

== 1929 Llanelly Borough Council election ==
In addition to the six councillors, three aldermen stood down. However, Joseph Roberts and E. Willis Jones, both of whom had been members of the authority since Llanelli obtained borough status in 1913, chose to stand down.. At the election, Elias Davies regained the seat he lost two years previously (having unsuccessfully contested Ward One in 1928) while in Ward Three, Labour councillor Stanley Davies lost at the expense of retiring aldermen, W. Powell Rees. Former Labour councillor Owen Jones, now running as an Independent, was unsuccessful.

=== Ward One (two seats) ===
Ward One 1929
Party	Candidate	Votes	%	±%
Independent	J.H. Williams*	1,625		
Labour	John Hughes*	1,507		
Independent	William Vivian	1,215		
Independent	D. Haddon Jones	1,006		
Communist	Enoch Collins	61		

=== Ward Two (two seats) ===
Ward Two 1929
Party	Candidate	Votes	%	±%
Labour	Tom Charles*	2,167		
Labour	Elias Davies	1,779		
Independent	Jack Auckland*	1,579		
Communist	Bryn James	109		

=== Ward Three (two seats) ===
Ward Three 1929
Party	Candidate	Votes	%	±%
Independent	W. Powell Rees**	1,369		
Labour	H.W. Bowen*	1,173		
Labour	Stanley Davies*	929		
Independent	Owen Jones	613		
Communist	Harry Jones	64		

=== By-elections ===
At the statutory meeting, Martin R. Richards, Jack Evans and William Davies (all Independents) were appointed aldermen. Coverage of the by-elections highlighted the failure of Independents to rally around a single candidate. Labour won two of the wards and came within a small margin of winning all three.

=== Ward 1 by-election (one seat) ===
Ward 1 by-election 1929
Party	Candidate	Votes	%	±%
Independent	William Vivian	1,076		
Labour	Percy M. Evans	1,060		
Independent	D. Haddon Jones	688		
Independent	Tom Hughes	434		

=== Ward 2 by-election (one seat) ===
Ward 2 by-election 1929
Party	Candidate	Votes	%	±%
Labour	D. James Davies	1,464		
Independent	Jack Auckland	1,282		

=== Ward 3 by-election (one seat) ===
Ward 3 by-election 1929
Party	Candidate	Votes	%	±%
Labour	F. Stanley Davies	1,127		
Independent	Owen Jones	489		

== 1930 Llanelly Borough Council election ==
Independent candidates won all seats in an election dominated by a dispute over the purchase of the tramway company by the borough council, a proposal supported by Labour councillors.

=== Ward One (two seats) ===
Ward One 1930
Party	Candidate	Votes	%	±%
Independent	Frank J. Rees*	2,471		
Independent	Roland P. Thomas*	2,230		
Labour	Percy M. Evans	1,612		
Labour	S. Vicary	1,031		

=== Ward Two (two seats) ===
Ward Two 1930
Party	Candidate	Votes	%	±%
Independent	W.H. Charles*	1,875		
Independent	Joseph Preece	1,658		
Labour	John Hughes	1,508		
Labour	J.G. Davies	1,348		
Communist	Brin James	218		

=== Ward Three (two seats) ===
Ward Three 1930
Party	Candidate	Votes	%	±%
Independent	Theo Jenkins*	1,314		
Independent	Robert Richards	1,252		
Labour	Stanley Davies*	994		
Labour	T. Colvin	518		
Communist	J. Cowern	45		
Communist	Arthur Evans	26		

== 1931 Llanelly Borough Council election ==
The election wa fought in the immediate aftermath of the 1931 General Election when Dr J.H. Williams had once again been returned as Labour member for the Llanelli constituency following a straight fight with a 'National' candidate, Frank J. Rees (a member of the borough council). Twenty candidates contested the three wards, including a full slate of Communist candidates for the first time (although the party had failed to raise a deposit to contest the recent General Election). A heavy poll saw five Independents returned, including a gain from Labour in Ward Two. In Ward One, the sitting Independents polled stronlgly and held off thechallenge of Labour, including Percy Evans, who had been returned to Carmarthenshire County Council at a by-election earlier in the year following a split in the Labour vote.

=== Ward One (two seats) ===
Ward One 1931
Party	Candidate	Votes	%	±%
Independent	William Vivian*	3,052		
Independent	Daniel Roberts*	2,298		
Labour	Percy M. Evans	1,533		
Labour	John Davies	891		
Communist	Arthur Evans	194		
Communist	E. Leyshon	131		

=== Ward Two (two seats) ===
Ward Two 1931
Party	Candidate	Votes	%	±%
Independent	W.E. Davies*	2,238		
Independent	Martin L. Edwards	1,712		
Labour	D. James Davies*	1,712		
Labour	William Willams	1,673		
Communist	Bryn James	333		
Communist	E.E. Seward	172		

=== Ward Three (two seats) ===
Ward Three 1931
Party	Candidate	Votes	%	±%
Labour	D. Grant Evans*	1,162		
Independent	W.J. Davies*	920		
Labour	George Davies	784		
Independent	Owen Jones	598		
Independent	Mrs L.C. Jonathan	496		
Independent	F. Howells	447		
Communist	Enoch Collins	116		
Communist	Harry Jones	52		

== 1932 Llanelly Borough Council election ==
The annual election was characterised by multiple candidates in all three wards. The Labour vote was threatened by challenge not only of Communist candidates but also ILP candidates who included some former prominent Labour figures such as Percy Evans, a county councillor, and D. James Davies, a former borough councillor. In Ward 2, three Independent candidates stood, which raised fears of a split vote before the election. In addition to the six councillors, three aldermen came to the end of their term and sought re-election.

In Ward One, retiring alderman David Jennings and sitting member J.H. Williams were returned, with retiring labour member John Hughes losing his seat. His defeat was attributed, in part, to the intervention of an ILP candidate. There had been an expectation that the sitting Labour members in Ward Two would be threatened by the ILP, but they withstood this challenge as well as that of the Independents candidates. These included T. Hay Samuel, the outgoing mayor, a member of the council since its formation in 1913, and retiring alderman; and also W.T.Morris, a sitting County councillor seeking to regain the seat on the borough council that he lost some years previously. The Independents were more successful in Ward Three, where both Labour candidates, including retiring alderman Morgan Morgan, were defeated.

=== Ward One (two seats) ===
Ward One 1932
Party	Candidate	Votes	%	±%
Independent	J.H. Williams*	1,995		
Independent	David Jennings**	1,840		
Labour	John Hughes*	1,637		
Ind. Labour Party	J.G. Davies	386		
Communist	Bryn James	331		
Ind. Labour Party	Robert J. Rees	301		
Communist	Arthur Evans	298		

=== Ward Two (two seats) ===
Ward Two 1932
Party	Candidate	Votes	%	±%
Labour	Tom Charles*	1,499		
Labour	Elias Davies	1,278		
Ind. Labour Party	Percy M. Evans	1,118		
Independent	W.T. Morris	1,100		
Independent	T. Hay Samuel**	1,066		
Ind. Labour Party	D. James Davies	859		
Independent	Tom Jeffreys	685		
Communist	Enoch Collins	342		
Communist	E.E. Seaward	121		

=== Ward Three (two seats) ===
Ward Three 1932
Party	Candidate	Votes	%	±%
Independent	W. Powell Rees*	1,592		
Independent	A.H. Olive*	1,339		
Labour	H.W. Bowen*	951		
Labour	Morgan Morgan**	854		
Communist	E. Leyshon	327		
Independent	F. Howells	326		
Communist	Tom Colvin	166		

=== By-elections ===
At the statutory meeting, Frank J. Rees (Ind), Tom Charles (Lab) and Theo Jenkins (Ins) wee elected aldermen. As was the case three years previously, concern was expressed about a split Independent vote in Ward Two as both candidates who unsuccessfully fought three weeks earlier again stood for the single seat. W.T. Morris withdrew before the poll but Hay Samuel and the official Labour candidate were defeated by the ILP. Labour won the other two seats as ex-councillors defeated at the fist election were successful at their second attempt.

=== Ward 1 by-election (one seat) ===
Ward 1 by-election 1932
Party	Candidate	Votes	%	±%
Labour	John Hughes*	1,427		
Ind. Labour Party	James G. Davies	248		
Communist	Bryn James	90		

=== Ward 2 by-election (one seat) ===
Ward 2 by-election 1932
Party	Candidate	Votes	%	±%
Ind. Labour Party	Percy M. Evans	1,172		
Independent	T. Hay Samuel*	883		
Labour	John Hughes	853		
Communist	Enoch Collins	50		

=== Ward 3 by-election (one seat) ===
Ward 3 by-election 1932
Party	Candidate	Votes	%	±%
Labour	H.W. Bowen*	1,079		
Independent	Fred Howells	591		
Communist	E. Leyshon	164		

== 1933 Llanelly Borough Council election ==
The election resulted in Labour gaining one seat from the Independents. This was in Ward Two, where Douglas Hughes, a county councillor since 1931, took a seat despite the Labour vote being split by the intervention of the ILP. In Ward One, Mervyn Paton, clerk to Kidwelly Borough Council, took a seat at the expense of Roland Thomas, a long-serving member who was also a leading figure in the Welsh Rugby Union. There was an increase in the Communist vote in all three wards.

=== Ward One (two seats) ===
Ward One 1933
Party	Candidate	Votes	%	±%
Independent	Mervyn D.J. Paton	1,838		
Labour	John Hughes*	1,837		
Independent	Roland P. Thomas*	1,470		
Ind. Labour Party	James G. Davies	651		
Communist	Brin James	536		

=== Ward Two (two seats) ===
Ward Two 1933
Party	Candidate	Votes	%	±%
Labour	W. Douglas Hughes	1,495		
Independent	W.H. Charles*	1,339		
Ind. Labour Party	D. James Davies	1,254		
Labour	Ben Griffiths	1,012		
Independent	Joseph Preece*	893		
Communist	Enoch Collins	422		

=== Ward Three (two seats) ===
Ward Three 1933
Party	Candidate	Votes	%	±%
Labour	H.W. Bowen*	1,197		
Independent	Robert Richards*	1,105		
Independent	Dr L.C. Edwards	894		
Communist	E. Leyshon	497		

== 1934 Llanelly Borough Council election ==
Eight seats were contested, as opposed to the usual six, following the resignation of Jack Evans and the death of Frank J. Rees. J.H. Williams and Elias Davies had been elevated to the aldermanic bench to fill the two vacancies resulting in three seats being vacant in Wards One and Two. The outstanding feature was the surprise election of Ernest Leyshon, the Communist candidate, in Ward Three, although his success at the Harbour Trust election in September had indicated a further increase in support for the Communists. Elsewhere, Roland Thomas was elected to fill the vacancy in Ward One following his defeat the previous year.

=== Ward One (three seats) ===
Ward One 1934
Party	Candidate	Votes	%	±%
Independent	Daniel Roberts*	2,151		
Independent	William Vivian*	2,005		
Independent	Roland P. Thomas	1,871		
Labour	Joseph Howells	1,046		
Communist	Bryn James	887		
Labour	J. Williams	838		
Labour	H. Rees	797		
Ind. Labour Party	J.G. Davies	438		
Communist	Arthur Evans	319		
Ind. Labour Party	E. Jones	285		

=== Ward Two (three seats) ===
Ward Two 1934
Party	Candidate	Votes	%	±%
Independent	W.E. Davies*	1,816		
Independent	Martin L. Edwards*	1,622		
Labour	Daniel Rees	1,612		
Labour	William Williams	1,484		
Ind. Labour Party	D. James Davies	1,346		
Independent	Mrs Daisy Lewis	1,207		
Labour	T.H. Jenkins	816		
Communist	Enoch Collins	625		
Communist	H. Jones	246		

=== Ward Three (two seats) ===
Ward Three 1934
Party	Candidate	Votes	%	±%
Labour	D. Grant Evans*	1,185		
Communist	Ernest Leyshon	1,112		
Independent	W.J. Davies*	726		
Independent	W.J. Thomas	645		
Labour	G. Every	517		

== 1935 Llanelly Borough Council election ==
In addition to the six councillors, three aldermen retired leaving a potential nine retiring members competing for six seats. However, following previous concerns about a split Independent votes, Roland P. Thomas (Ward One) and William Davies (Ward Three) decided not to seek re-election and wait for the forthcoming by-elections.

In both Wards One and Two, the Independent candidates prevailed, with Alderman Elias Davies, only elevated to the aldermanic bench the previous year, losing his seat. Retiring ILP member Percy Evans was also defeated. Ward Three, however, saw a huge surprise when W. Powell Rees, a borough councillor for twenty years and a serving county councillor, being comfortably defeated by the Communist candidate Brinley James.

=== Ward One (two seats) ===
Ward One 1935
Party	Candidate	Votes	%	±%
Independent	David Jennings*	2,272		
Independent	Martin R. Richards**	2,180		
Labour	H. Percy Rees	1,343		
Communist	Enoch Collins	1,016		

=== Ward Two (two seats) ===
Ward Two 1935
Party	Candidate	Votes	%	±%
Labour	Daniel Rees*	1,737		
Independent	W.E. Phillips	1,641		
Labour	Elias Davies**	1,605		
Independent	G.F. Austin	1,341		
Ind. Labour Party	D. James Davies	905		
Ind. Labour Party	Percy M. Evans*	773		

=== Ward Three (two seats) ===
Ward Three 1935
Party	Candidate	Votes	%	±%
Independent	A.H. Olive*	1,565		
Communist	Brinley James	1,373		
Independent	W. Powell Rees**	1,192		
Labour	Glyn Every	786		

=== By-elections ===
At the statutory meeting, Dan Roberts (Ind), W.E. Davies (Ind) and H.W. Bowen (Lab) were elected aldermen. A further vacancy in Ward Three was created by the death the previous month of the Labour councillor, D. Grant Evans.

Much attention focused on Ward Three, where the Communists sought further success but they fell short by 32 votes behind ex-Alderman William Davies and Labour candidate John Griffiths. In Wards One and Two, old members regained seats as the Communists did not contest. Roland Thomas, first elected to the former Urban District Council in 1911, was again returned.

=== Ward 1 by-election (one seat) ===
Ward 1 by-election 1935
Party	Candidate	Votes	%	±%
Independent	Roland P. Thomas*	1,738		
Labour	H. Percy Rees	1,082		

=== Ward 2 by-election (one seat) ===
Ward 2 by-election 1935
Party	Candidate	Votes	%	±%
Labour	Elias Davies	1,602		
Ind. Labour Party	D. James Davies	833		
Independent	John Zammit	665		

=== Ward 3 by-election (one seat) ===
Ward 3 by-election 1935
Party	Candidate	Votes	%	±%
Independent	William Davies**	1,013		
Labour	John Griffiths	947		
Communist	Enoch Collins	932		
Independent	W.J. Davies	771		
Labour	George Davies	420		
Independent	J. Bradbury	133		

== 1936 Llanelly Borough Council election ==
Two sitting members were defeated but the overall composition of the Council remained unchanged.

=== Ward One (two seats) ===
Ward One 1936
Party	Candidate	Votes	%	±%
Independent	Dr H.D. Llewellyn	2,232		
Independent	Mervyn D.J. Paton*	2,141		
Labour	John Hughes*	1,308		
Labour	J. Llewellyn Evans	1,163		

=== Ward Two (two seats) ===
Ward Two 1936
Party	Candidate	Votes	%	±%
Labour	W. Douglas Hughes*	1,865		
Labour	D.J. Joseph	1,695		
Independent	W.H. Charles*	1,579		
Independent	Mrs Daisy Lewis	1,259		

=== Ward Three (two seats) ===
Ward Three 1936
Party	Candidate	Votes	%	±%
Labour	J. Griffiths*	1,257		
Independent	A.G. Brown	717		
Communist	Enoch Collins	541		
Labour	H. Heath	518		
Independent	P.W. Beynon	380		
Independent	J. Bradbury	93		

== 1937 Llanelly Borough Council election ==
All three wards were closely contested and the defeated candidates including three sitting county councillors, namely Martin L. Edwards, who lost his seat in Ward Two; and J. Llewellyn Evans and David Richards who both failed to gain seats. W. Powell Rees regained a seat in Ward Three after being defeated by a Communist candidate in 1935. The Llanelly Star decried the split in the Independent vote which contributed to the defeat of long-serving member William Davies.

=== Ward One (two seats) ===
Ward One 1937
Party	Candidate	Votes	%	±%
Independent	Roland P. Thomas*	1,792		
Independent	William Vivian*	1,640		
Labour	David L. Richards	1,607		
Independent	E.E. Powell	858		

=== Ward Two (two seats) ===
Ward Two 1937
Party	Candidate	Votes	%	±%
Labour	W.J. Davies	1,693		
Independent	W.H, Charles	1,647		
Labour	J. Llewellyn Evans	1,634		
Independent	Martin L. Edwards*	1,588		

=== Ward Three (two seats) ===
Ward Three 1937
Party	Candidate	Votes	%	±%
Independent	W. Powell Rees	1,337		
Independent	Robert Richards	1,022		
Independent	William Davies*	940		
Labour	Harry Heath	614		
Communist	Ernest Leyshon*	439		

=== By-elections ===
Two by-elections were held during the first half of 1938 following the deaths of long-serving councillors William Vivian and Roland P. Thomas.

=== Ward One by-election 1938 ===
A by-election was held on 17 February 1938 following the death of William Vivian. William Davies, former mayor and a member for 21 years who had been defeated in Ward Three the previous November, won the seat by a narrow margin despite a split Independent vote.

Ward One by-election February 1938
Party	Candidate	Votes	%	±%
Independent	William Davies	1,670		
Labour	David L. Richards	1,520		
Independent	E.E. Powell	426		

=== Ward One by-election 1938 ===
A by-election was held on 5 May 1938 following the death of Roland P. Thomas. David Richards, having lost narrowly at the previous by-election, was elected with a comfortable majority.

Ward One by-election May 1938
Party	Candidate	Votes	%	±%
Labour	David L. Richards	1,646		
Independent	J. Preece	1,100		

== 1938 Llanelly Borough Council election ==
Three aldermen and six councilors stood down. The mayor, Elias Davies, indicated that he would retire but ultimately chose to oppose the official Labour candidates. He was unsuccessful in Ward Two. In Ward One. David Jennings and Martin Richards, members since pre-1914 days were comfortably returned ahead of the Labour candidate, County Alderman Joseph Howell. In Ward Three, Communist Brin James was defeated.

=== Ward One (two seats) ===
Ward One 1938
Party	Candidate	Votes	%	±%
Independent	David Jennings*	2,066		
Independent	Martin R. Richards**	1,866		
Labour	Joseph Howell	1,370		
Independent	W. Hughes	904		

=== Ward Two (two seats) ===
Ward Two 1938
Party	Candidate	Votes	%	±%
Labour	Daniel Rees*	2,264		
Independent	W.E. Phillips*	1,737		
Labour	D.J. Charles	1,662		
Independent	Mrs Daisy Lewis	936		
Independent Labour	Elias Davies**	819		

=== Ward Three (two seats) ===
Ward Three 1935
Party	Candidate	Votes	%	±%
Independent	A.H. Olive*	1,638		
Independent	Theo Jenkins**	1,119		
Communist	Brinley James*	787		
Labour	T.M. Price	683		
Independent	W.J. Davies	384		
Independent	J. Bradbury	102		

=== By-elections ===
At the statutory meeting, David Jennings, W.H. Charles and Robert Richards were elected aldermen. This was the second occasion that Jennings had been appointed for a six years term. At the ensuing by-elections, Brin James regained his seat in Ward Three as a Communist, although he had broken with the local party. In Ward One, the Labour candidate Joseph Howell was again unsuccessful while D.J. Charles was returned unopposed in Ward Two.

=== Ward 1 by-election (one seat) ===
Ward 1 by-election 1938
Party	Candidate	Votes	%	±%
Independent	H.F.M. Coombs	1,344		
Labour	Joseph Howell	1,257		

=== Ward 2 by-election (one seat) ===
Ward 2 by-election 1938
Party	Candidate	Votes	%	±%
Labour	D.J. Charles	Unopposed		

=== Ward 3 by-election (one seat) ===
Ward 3 by-election 1938
Party	Candidate	Votes	%	±%
Communist	Brin James	802		
Independent	Frederick Howells	689		
Labour	T.M. Price	499		
Independent	William Thomas	242		
Independent	J. Bradbury	19		
