= Listed buildings in Llanelli =

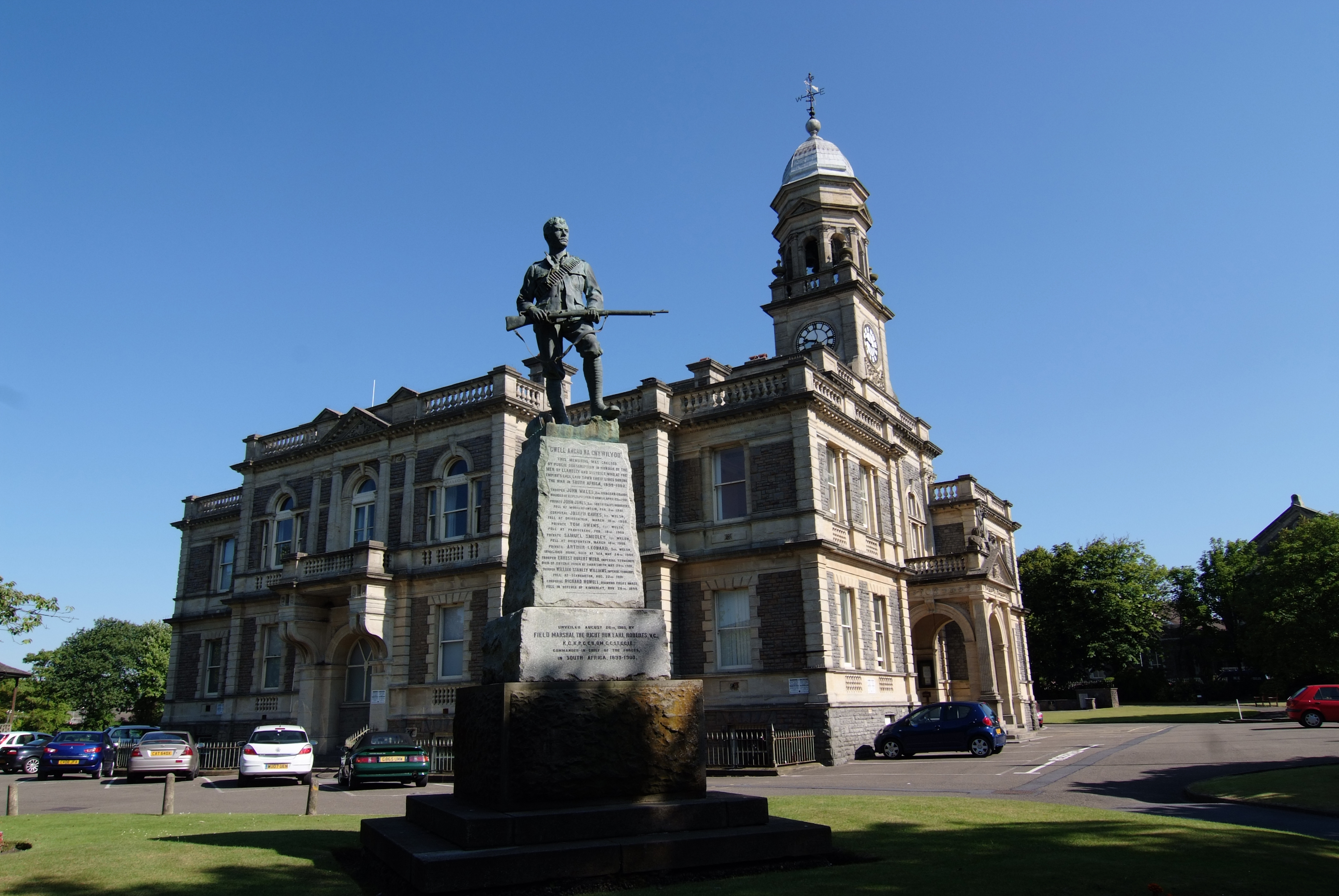
Llanelli Town Hall and Boer War Memorial

There are many listed buildings in Llanelli, the largest town in Carmarthenshire, Wales. Llanelli's listed buildings include houses, churches and chapels, schools, commercial buildings, the town hall, a signal box and other industrial architecture.

A listed building is one considered to be of special architectural, historical or cultural significance, and has restrictions on amendments or demolition. Buildings are listed as either Grade I, II* and II buildings lists, with the Grade I being the most important.

== Key ==
Grade	Criteria
Grade I	Buildings of exceptional, usually national, interest (generally the top 2%).
Grade II*	Particularly important buildings of more than special interest.
Grade II	Buildings of special interest, which warrant every effort being made to preserve them.

== Grade I and II* listed buildings ==
Name	Photograph	Grade	Date	Location	Description
Llanelly House, Bridge Street	Llanelly House	I	1714	Town centre 51.6834°N 4.1614°W	A townhouse built for Sir Thomas Stepney and later bought by local industrialist, William Chambers, in 1825. Described as "the most outstanding domestic building of its early Georgian type to survive in South Wales". Later 19th-century shop front added. The house opened to the public in 2013 after a 10-year restoration.
No 20 Vaughan Street	Missing image	I	1714	Town centre 51.68333°N 4.16150°W	A former rear wing of Llanelly House. Contains a large fireplace.
No 22 Vaughan Street	Missing image	I	1714	Town centre 51.68330°N 4.16149°W	A former rear wing of Llanelly House.
No 24 Vaughan Street	Missing image	I	1714	Town centre 51.68327°N 4.16148°W	A former rear wing of Llanelly House.
Church of St Ellyw, Bridge Street	St Ellyw Church	II*	1400s	Town centre 51.68375°N 4.16103°W	Llanelli's parish church, with a tower possibly dating to the 1400s. The remainder of the church dates from 1905 to 1906.
Tabernacle Chapel, Coleshill Terrace	Tabernacle Chapel	II*	1873	Town centre 51.68241°N 4.16373°W	By John Humphreys of Morriston. Described as "probably the most elaborate chapel in Llanelli", the forecourt and railings are also listed.
Tinhouse of Old Castle Tinplate Works	Tinhouse	II*	1913	Tyisha; 51.67955°N 4.17217°W	A surviving tinplate works from 1905 to 1913, with rubble walls and an asbestos roof. It is a rare example of one with its original tinning bays.

== Grade II listed buildings ==
According to the British Listed Buildings website there are 83 buildings and structures in Llanelli listed as Grade II, including the Town Hall, chapels and churches, commercial and industrial buildings, a signal box, walls and railings. These include:

Name	Photograph	Grade	Date	Location	Function	Description
Barclays Bank, Vaughan Street	Barclays Bank	II	1870c	Town centre 51.6831°N 4.1613°W	Bank building	Three storey commercial building in a mixed Italianate style. In the late 19th-century it was occupied by the London and Provincial Bank.
Boer War Memorial	Boer War Memorial	II	1905	Town centre 51.68148°N 4.16432°W	War memorial	Located in front of the Town Hall. A bronze sculpture of a rifleman (by F. Doyle Jones) standing on top of a marble plinth, which lists the dead of the Boer War on the front.
Buckleys Brewery Maltings Building	Buckleys Brewery Building	II	1866	Mount Pleasant; 51.68430°N 4.15898°W	Industrial building	Built as part of the town's Buckleys Brewery expansion 1852–66, this surviving building is a reminder of a significant local industry. The building was listed in 2007 and featured in the 2017 Top Ten Endangered Buildings list of The Victorian Society.
Church of All Saints	All Saints	II	1874	Mount Pleasant; 51.68524°N 4.16350°W	Church building	Just north of the town centre, designed by G E Street of London in a Gothic style. Includes "exceptional" stained glass windows. Churchyard walls and gates listed separately.
Llanelli West Signal Box	Llanelli West Signal Box	II	1877	Tyisha; 51.67428°N 4.16342°W	Signal Box	Built on the South Wales Railway line, Llanelli West is the last surviving example of five original Type 2 signal boxes in the area. Control equipment replaced in 1973.
Lloyds Bank, Vaughan Street	Lloyds Bank	II	1920c	Town centre 51.6821°N 4.1609°W	Bank building	Three storey bank building in Portland stone. Listed as a "dignified example of inter-War classical design".
Parc Howard Mansion	Parc Howard Mansion	II	1885	Parc Howard; 51.68941°N 4.16005°W	Museum building	Originally called Bryncaerau Castle, the house was built for the wealthy Buckley family, then donated to the town by Sir Stafford and Lady Howard in 1912. Two-storey bath stone building in an Italianate style with a large front covered entrance. Gates, gatepiers and railings separately listed.
Park Congregational Church	Park Congregational Church	II	1865	Town centre 51.68015°N 4.16144°W	Church building	Designed by Lander and Bedells of London in a Gothic style with a 104 foot high spire. Ravaged by fire in 2015, it lost its roof and interior.
No 8, Bridge Street	No 8, Bridge Street	II	1850c	Town centre 51.68178°N 4.16450°W	Shop building	Probably mid 19th century, adjoining the Grade I Llanelly House and originally part of that building. The ground floor comprises 2 large shop fronts, the right hand side one including original detailing.
Town Hall, Church Street	Town Hall	II	1896	Town centre 51.68178°N 4.16450°W	Town Hall	By Williams Griffiths of Llanelli and built between 1894 and 1896 in an Italianate style. Dated 1895 below the east clock of the tower. Council chamber altered considerably in 1970. Garden railings and gates listed separately.
Zion Baptist Chapel	Zion Baptist Chapel	II	1858	Town centre 51.68360°N 4.15770°W	Church building	By Henry Rogers of Llanelli, with a Pedimented Italianate front facade. Dated 1857 in an oval plaque, though built 1857–8. Forecourt railings included in the listing.

== See also ==
- Grade I listed buildings in Carmarthenshire
- Grade II* listed buildings in Carmarthenshire

== Sources ==
- Listed Buildings in Llanelli, Carmarthenshire, BritishListedBuildings.co.uk
- Royal Commission on the Ancient and Historical Monuments of Wales (RCAHMW) website listings
