= Russell Manners =

Russell Manners may refer to:

- Russell Manners (British Army officer) (1736–1800)
- Russell Manners (MP) (c. 1771–1840), son of the above, Member of Parliament for Grantham 1806–1807
- Russell Henry Manners (1800–1870), admiral and astronomer
