= Stepney (surname) =

Stepney is an English surname. Notable people with the surname include:

- Alban Stepney (died 1611), English politician
- Alex Stepney (born 1942), English footballer
- Arthur Cowell-Stepney (1834–1909), British landowner and politician
- Catherine Stepney (1778–1845), English novelist
- Charles Stepney (1931–1976), American record producer and musician
- George Stepney (1663–1707), English poet and diplomat
- John Stepney (disambiguation), multiple people
- Michael Stepney (born 1980), Scottish bowler
- Nigel Stepney (1958–2014), British Formula One mechanic
- Susan Stepney (born 1958), British computer scientist
- Stepney family, landowners in Wales from the 16th to 19th centuries
