= Stepney (disambiguation) =

Stepney is a district in the London Borough of Tower Hamlets, England.

Stepney may also refer to:

== Places ==
- Stepney (London County Council constituency), 1949–1965
- Stepney (UK Parliament constituency), 1885–1918 and 1950–1974
- Stepney, Kingston upon Hull, East Riding of Yorkshire, England
- Stepney, South Australia, Australia
- Stepney, Connecticut, US
- Metropolitan Borough of Stepney, former Borough of London

== People ==
- Stepney (surname)
- Stepney baronets
- Stepney family

== Other uses ==
- LB&SCR A1X class 55 Stepney, a preserved steam locomotive on the Bluebell Railway
  - Stepney the "Bluebell" Engine, a character in The Railway Series by the Rev. W. Awdry, and its television adaptation Thomas & Friends
- Stepney, a character in the TV series The Wombles
- Stepney, a popular name for a spare tire
- Stepney (2019 film), an Indian Marathi-language film by Aziz Naser
- Stepney, an Indian series of Decanni films
