= 1876 Carmarthen Boroughs by-election =

UK Parliamentary by-election in Wales

The 1876 Carmarthen Boroughs by-election was fought on 14 August 1876. The by-election was called following the resignation of the incumbent Conservative MP, Charles William Nevill. It was won by the Liberal candidate Arthur Cowell-Stepney, who was returned unopposed.

== Background ==
A Liberal seat for decades, Carmarthen Boroughs fell to the Conservatives in 1874 when the octogenarian sitting member, Sir John Stepney, stood down. He was succeeded as Liberal candidate by his son, Arthur, who was not regarded as holding radical views. To general surprise he declared his support for policies such as the disestablishment of the Anglican church in Wales. As a result, Charles Nevill, who resisted calls to oppose the elder Stepney in 1868, entered the fray, and was championed as 'one of the largest employers of labour' in the locality.

During his short parliamentary career, Nevill did not always support Conservative policy. He voted in favour of the extension of the county franchise, and also supported Osborne Morgan's Burials' Bill. On 19 July 1876, Nevill indicated his intention to resign as an MP, in a letter to the Vicar of Carmarthen, the Rev Latimer M. Jones. Nevill cited his business interests as the main reason for his decision.

== Candidates ==
A number of possible candidates were initially mentioned, both Conservatives and Liberals. On the Conservative side, Mansel Lewis of Stradey and J.S. Tregoning of Iscoed, Ferryside were mentioned Among the Liberals, potential candidates included Arthur Stepney, W.R.H. Powell of Maesgwynne, who had unsuccessfully contested Carmarthenshire in 1874, B.T. Williams, the Recorder of Carmarthen and Evan Matthew Richards, former member for Cardiganshire. Williams was initially regarded as the most likely candidate.

However, Liberals supporters of Arthur Stepney swiftly took action to select a candidate before their political opponents had any opportunity to fully consider their options. On the morning of 31 July, Arthur Stepney travelled to Carmarthen by train, where he was met by a delegation of prominent liberals who held a formal meeting chaired by the Mayor, David Edwards. That same evening a meeting was held in Llanelli, presided over by John Randell, chairman of the Llanelly Local Board of Health, with Stepney being formally adopted. Stepney's actions not only caught his Conservative opponents unawares but also rival aspirants for the Liberal nomination. B.T. Williams was said to have intended to declare his candidature but withdrew to avoid a division in the ranks, while the claims of Lewis Morris were also ignored.

It was soon apparent that the Conservatives would not field a candidate, and it does not appear that any potential candidates were considered.

== Outcome ==
Within a few days it became apparent that Arthur Stepney would be returned unopposed.

== Result ==
1876 Carmarthen by-election
| Party | Candidate | Votes | % | ±% |
|---|---|---|---|---|
| Liberal | Arthur Cowell-Stepney | Unopposed | | |
| Registered electors | | | | |
| Liberal gain from Conservative | | | | |

== See also ==
- Lists of United Kingdom by-elections
