= Chambers family =

The Chambers family were landowners, prominent in the local politics of west Wales, and prominent sports administrators.

== William Chambers senior (1773–1855) ==
William Chambers was born on 26 September 1773. Soho Square London. He was nominally the fourth son of Abraham Chambers (d. 1782) of Totteridge, Hertfordshire; his eldest brother Samuel (1763–1843) became a prominent London banker and was knighted. William was educated at St John's College, Cambridge, and bought out his brothers' interest in the estate of Bicknor, Kent, acquired by Abraham. From 1803 to 1814 he was one of the British civilians detailed in France by order of Napoleon. However, Chambers was actually the youngest illegitimate son of Sir John Stepney, 8th baronet of Prendergast and Llanelly House, who had conducted an illicit affair with his mother, Anne Chambers formerly James. William Chambers became heir to the large estates of the Stepney Family in Carmarthenshire under the complex terms of Sir John's will, which initially bequeathed the estate to three of his friends for the duration of their lifetimes. Chambers inherited on the death of the last of these, the first Marquess of Cholmondeley, in 1827.

=== Chambers at Llanelli ===
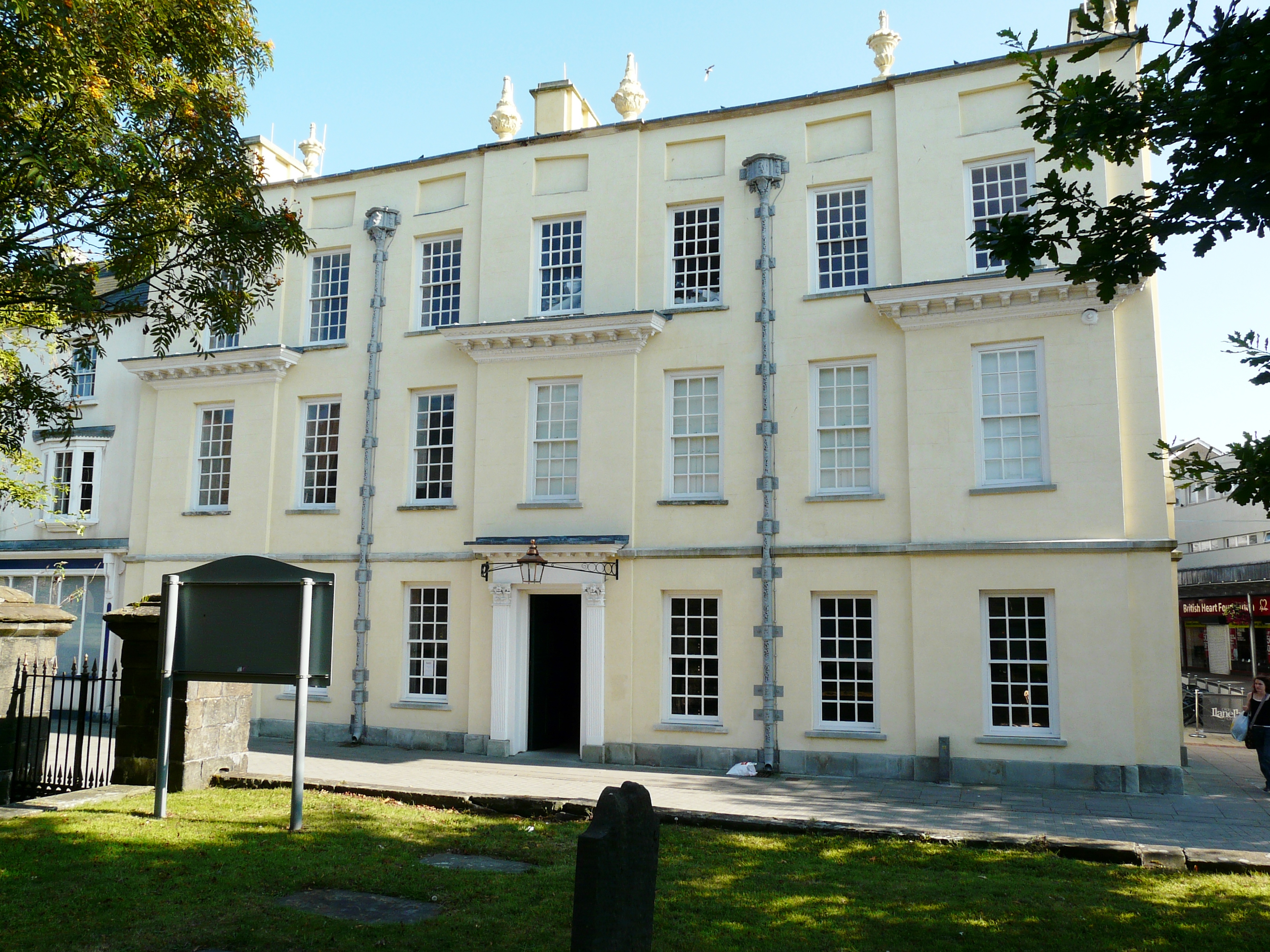
Llanelly House

William moved into the old Stepney mansion, Llanelly House, and immediately began to play an active part in local affairs. He served as sheriff of Carmarthenshire in 1828, became a portreeve of Llanelli in 1831 and a burgess in 1835, in which year he also formed a gas company for the town; he established a Mechanics Institute in 1840 and a savings bank in 1847. However, much of his time in the town was taken up with litigation against John Stepney Cowell (later Sir John Cowell-Stepney) and his son Frederick, who stood to be the next inheritors under the terms of the 8th baronet's will. William Chambers senior died at Llanelly House on 9 February 1855.

== William Chambers junior ==
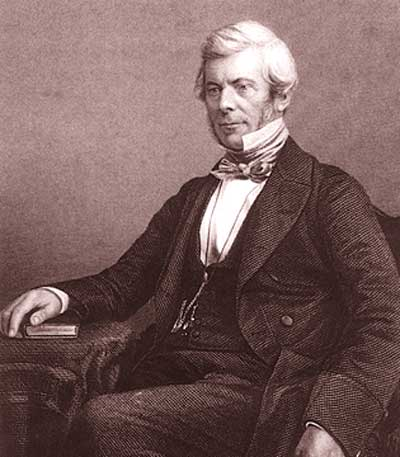
William Chambers junior

William Chambers junior was born at Valenciennes on 24 May 1809 and, like his father, was educated at St John's College, Cambridge. William senior was not actually married to his mother, Emma Maria Adams of Jamaica, although she was presented as 'Mrs Chambers' following the family's return to Britain and William senior's inheritance of the Stepney estate. They married belatedly in 1829, but William junior's illegitimacy, which had to be admitted publicly during one of the lawsuits with Stepney Cowell, disqualified him from inheriting the estate. Nevertheless, he became an active JP, first chairman of the local Board of Health, and in 1839 he established an important new pottery at Llanelli. He married Joanna Trant Payne in 1835. He played a prominent part in suppressing the Rebecca Riots, although he was widely suspected of being sympathetic towards the rioters' cause. Following his father's death he purchased the famous Hafod estate in Cardiganshire, but the expense proved crippling and he eventually lost it when he went bankrupt in 1871. Chambers died on 21 March 1882.

== Later generations ==
John Graham Chambers (1843–83), born at Llanelly House, became a noted sports journalist and administrator. He was largely responsible for devising modern rules for rowing, athletics and boxing (although the latter were named after his friend, the Marquess of Queensberry). His brother Charles Campbell Chambers (1850–1906) was an active cricketer and rugby player who in 1881 was elected the first President of the Welsh Rugby Union. Charles's son Robert Lambert Chambers married Dorothea Douglass, who as Mrs Lambert Chambers was the outstanding women's tennis player of the early twentieth century.

Further detailed research carried out by genealogist James Phillips-Evans has shown that the bloodlines of the Chambers and Stepney families were eventually united, but not until 1908 when Eleanor Etna Audley Thursby-Pelham married Alan Frederick James de Rutzen of Slebech. Eleanor Thursby-Pelham was a great-great-granddaughter of Emily Mary Anne Chambers (1771–1858), sister of William Chambers senior of Llanelly House, or rather his half-sister given that they only shared a mother, namely Anne James, wife of Abraham Chambers, whose adulterous affair with Sir John Stepney, Bt resulted in the birth of William Chambers in 1773. Eleanor's husband, Alan de Rutzen, was the son of Sir Albert de Rutzen and his wife, Horatia Augusta Stepney-Gulston, a great-great-granddaughter of Elizabeth Bridgetta Stepney (1749–1780), one of the sisters of Sir John Stepney, Bt who fathered William Chambers senior of Llanelly House. The living descendants of Alan James de Rutzen and Eleanor Etna Audley Thursby-Pelham therefore represent both the Chambers and Stepney families, and these living descendants are presently very few in number, being only Sir Edward Dashwood, Bt of West Wycombe Park and his three sisters, and their children.
