= Registered historic parks and gardens in Carmarthenshire =

List of buildings in county of Wales

Carmarthenshire shown within Wales

Carmarthenshire is a county in the south-west of Wales. It covers an area of 2,370 km^{2} (920 sq mi). In 2021 the population was approximately 188,200.

The Cadw/ICOMOS Register of Parks and Gardens of Special Historic Interest in Wales was established in 2002 and given statutory status in 2022. It is administered by Cadw, the historic environment agency of the Welsh Government. Elisabeth Whittle described Cadw as having a "somewhat special and guiding role" in the preservation of historic parks and gardens, since they are "an integral part of Welsh archaeological and architectural heritage". The register includes just under 400 sites, ranging from gardens of private houses, to cemeteries and public parks. Parks and gardens are listed at one of three grades, matching the grading system used for listed buildings. Grade I is the highest grade, for sites of exceptional interest; Grade II*, the next highest, denotes parks and gardens of great quality; while Grade II denotes sites of special interest.

There are 19 registered parks and gardens in Carmarthenshire. One is listed at Grade I, four at Grade II*, and 14 at Grade II.

== Key ==
Grade	Criteria
I	Parks and gardens of exceptional interest
II*	Parks and gardens of great quality
II	Parks and gardens of special interest

== List of parks and gardens ==
List of parks and gardens
Name	Location Grid Ref. (Note: Sometimes known as OSGB36, the grid reference is based on the British national grid reference system used by the Ordnance Survey.) Geo-coordinates	Date Listed	Description / Notes	Grade	Reference Number	Image
Aberglasney	Llangathen; SN5802322163; 51°52′46″N 4°03′46″W	1 February 2022	Country house garden The most important feature is the early seventeenth-century arcaded court and raised walk to the west of the grade II* listed house. There is also a coach house, two walled gardens, a pond garden and areas of woodland.	II*	PGW(Dy)5(CAM)	a walled garden overlooked by a house
Bishop's Palace, Abergwili	Abergwili; SN4416320944; 51°51′53″N 4°15′49″W	1 February 2022	Park and gardens The former Bishop’s Palace, now a museum, is within a triangular area of informal garden in the north-west of the grounds. An area of parkland separates the gardens from the Bishop's Pond, a large oxbox lake, that occupies the eastern section of the site.	II	PGW(Dy)59(CAM)	a stone mansion
Derwydd	Llandybie; SN6130517910; 51°50′32″N 4°00′49″W	1 February 2022	Country house garden and kitchen garden A late nineteenth-century garden laid out with terracing to the east and south-east of the house. The walled garden to the north of the house occupies the site of an earlier terraced garden. The woodland area, which includes a Gorsedd circle, was created 1887–1906.	II	PGW(Dy)6(CAM)	
Dolaucothi	Cynwyl Gaeo; SN6612040681; 52°02′53″N 3°57′09″W	1 February 2022	Park and country house garden The remains of the gardens lie around the site of the mansion, and the park is mainly to the south and south-west of this. The Afon Cothi passes east-west through the site.	II	PGW(Dy)7(CAM)	Dolaucothi
Edwinsford	Talley; SN6270934454; 51°59′28″N 3°59′59″W	1 February 2022	Park and gardens The eastern side of the site is woodland and parkland. To the west is the now derelict house around which was a formal pleasure garden. To the north of the house are the home farm buildings (the hamlet of Edwinsford) and the walled garden which probably dates to the early nineteenth century.	II	PGW(Dy)8(CAM)	Edwinsford
Glynhir	Llandybie; SN6377415007; 51°49′00″N 3°58′36″W	1 February 2022	Park and gardens The grounds, with their parkland, gardens and pleasure grounds, were mostly laid out in the early to mid-nineteenth century. The woodland garden with picturesque woodland walks is possibly earlier. There are several listed buildings including the mansion house, a dovecote, an ice house and the walled orchard.	II	PGW(Dy)9(CAM)	Glynhir
Golden Grove	Llanfihangel Aberbythych; SN5977319929; 51°51′36″N 4°02′12″W	1 February 2022	Park and gardens The late Georgian mansion of Golden Grove and its surrounding gardens lie within extensive parkland. The walled garden to the north of the house is on the site of an earlier house.	II*	PGW(Dy)10(CAM)	a path of wooden steps through woodland
Laugharne Castle & Castle House	Laugharne Township; SN3014910821; 51°46′11″N 4°27′43″W	1 February 2022	Garden The garden of Castle House remains private, but the gardens within the picturesque ruins of the medieval castle are open to the public. Restored in the 1990s to a layout based on that of the early nineteenth-century.	II	PGW(Dy)2(CAM)	A stone gatehouse
Llanmiloe House	Llanddowror; SN2475108795; 51°45′00″N 4°32′21″W	1 February 2022	Country house garden The present house was built in 1720 but has since been extensively modified. The gardens were redesigned when the house was extended in the early twentieth century.	II	PGW(Dy)1(CAM)	Llanmiloe House
Llechdwnni	Llandyfaelog; SN4273110141; 51°46′03″N 4°16′46″W	1 February 2022	Country house garden A seventeenth-century walled garden with a formal pool and a long terrace with gazebos.	II	PGW(Dy)21(CAM)	
Llwynywormwood	Myddfai; SN7697431914; 51°58′18″N 3°47′28″W	1 February 2022	Park and walled garden The estate covers around 62 acres (25 ha) of park and woodland. To the south of the farmstead and nearby ruined mansion is an early-nineteenth century walled garden.	II	PGW(Dy)71(CAM)	Llwynywormwood
Maesycrugiau Hall	Llanllwni; SN4775140659; 52°02′35″N 4°13′13″W	1 February 2022	Country house garden The gardens are contemporary with the Tudor Gothic style country house (built 1903–1905) and appear to incorporate a wall of the previous house destroyed by fire in 1902.	II	PGW(Dy)3(CAM)	
Middleton Hall	Llanarthney; SN5250518108; 51°50′30″N 4°08′29″W	1 February 2022	Gardens The landscaped park was laid out in late eighteenth and early nineteenth century. The walled kitchen garden and the sites of the pleasure garden and the house (built 1799, demolished in 1951 following a fire in 1931) are now part of the National Botanic Garden of Wales. The large elliptical glasshouse was constructed between 1995 and 2000.	II*	PGW(Dy)4(CAM)	a large glass structure within a landscape of trees and hills
Pantglas	Llanfynydd; SN5481325793; 51°54′41″N 4°06′40″W	1 February 2022	Gardens The Italianate mansion of c. 1853 (demolished in 1988 apart from the entrance tower) was surrounded by around 26 acres (11 ha) of woodland and garden, including a walled garden and a lake with central island.	II	PGW(Dy)11(CAM)	a stone tower, mostly hidden by trees
Parc Howard	Llanelli; SN5065701256; 51°41′23″N 4°09′39″W	1 February 2022	Public park and gardens The Italianate mansion and its grounds were donated to town of Llanelli by Sir Stafford and Lady Howard. The gardens were transformed into a public park which opened in 1912.	II	PGW(Dy)14(CAM)	a lawn with flower beds in front of a mansion
Paxton's Tower	Llanarthney; SN5404619190; 51°51′06″N 4°07′10″W	1 February 2022	Folly A triangular folly tower built in 1805–1809 for William Paxton and overlooking his estate of Middleton Hall. The tower, which is dedicated to Lord Nelson, occupies the open, grassy summit of an escarpment.	II*	PGW(Dy)49(CAM)	a stone tower on top of a grassy hill
Plas Dinefwr	Llangathen; SN6146222554; 51°53′02″N 4°00′47″W	1 February 2022	Park and gardens An eighteenth-century landscaped park with a small formal garden and walled gardens. Within the grounds are the scheduled monuments of the remains of a medieval castle and the site of two Roman forts.	I	PGW(Dy)12(CAM)	a large house in a woodland park
Stradey Castle	Llanelli Rural; SN4899301446; 51°41′27″N 4°11′06″W	1 February 2022	Park and gardens The parkland was probably enclosed by the seventeenth century and the walled garden is associated with the house of that period. This house was demolished before the building of the new mansion (c. 1850), with its formal terraced garden, located about 350 m (1,150 ft) to the north-east. The site of the old house has been turned into a woodland garden.	II	PGW(Dy)15(CAM)	Stradey Castle
Taliaris	Manordeilo and Salem; SN6379027864; 51°55′56″N 3°58′53″W	1 February 2022	Park and country house garden Formal gardens surround the house and walled gardens lie to its south-east. In an area of forestry to the north of the house is Llyn Taliaris, a kidney-shaped lake. The parks and gardens are thought to have originated in the mid-eighteenth century and their layout is largely unchanged since the mid-nineteenth century.	II	PGW(Dy)13(CAM)	a large house built of stone

== See also ==
- Scheduled monuments in Carmarthenshire
- Grade I listed buildings in Carmarthenshire
- Grade II* listed buildings in Carmarthenshire
