= Catherine Manners =

Catherine Manners may refer to:

- Catherine Manners, Duchess of Rutland (1657–1733), English noblewoman
- Catherine Manners (1675–1722), wife of John Leveson-Gower, 1st Baron Gower
- Catherine Manners (died 1780), wife of Henry Pelham
- Catherine Gray, Lady Manners (c. 1766–1852), Anglo-Irish aristocrat and poet
- Catherine Stepney (1778–1845), British novelist
