= Arthur Cowell-Stepney =

British landowner and politician

Sir Arthur Cowell-Stepney Bt
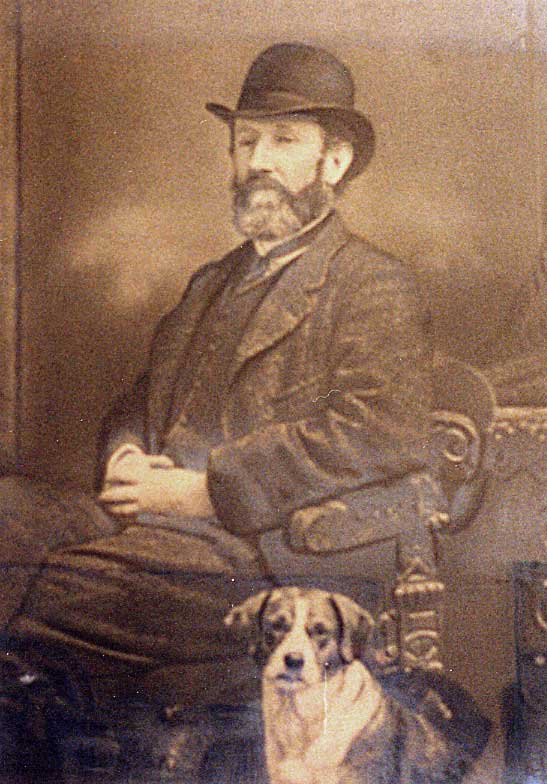
- Sir Arthur Cowell-Stepney and his dog.

Member of Parliament for Carmarthen Boroughs
- In office 1876–1878
- Preceded by: Charles William Nevill
- Succeeded by: Benjamin Thomas Williams
- In office 1886–1892
- Preceded by: John Jenkins
- Succeeded by: Evan Rowland Jones

Personal details
- Born: 26 December 1834
- Died: 2 July 1909 (aged 74) Yuma, Arizona, USA
- Party: Liberal
- Spouse: Margaret Warren

Sir Emile Algernon Arthur Keppel Cowell-Stepney, 2nd Baronet (26 December 1834 – 2 July 1909) was a British landowner and Liberal politician. He was the youngest son of Sir John Stepney Cowell-Stepney (1791–1877).

== Upbringing and career ==
Arthur Cowell was born on 26 December 1834. He was educated at Eton and subsequently became a clerk in the Foreign Office. In 1857 his father changed the family's surname to Cowell-Stepney following his inheritance of the Stepney family estates in Carmarthenshire. Arthur became heir to the estates, and to his family's new baronetcy, following the death of his elder brother Frederick in 1872.

== Political career ==
In the autumn of 1864, Arthur Stepney was briefly mentioned as a possible parliamentary candidate for Carmarthen Boroughs following the death of David Morris, and a deputation sought to persuade his father to support the proposal. However, John Cowell-Stepney had already waived his own claims in favour of William Morris. Morris was returned unopposed a few weeks later.

In 1876 he was elected Liberal MP for Carmarthen Boroughs, the seat that his father had held from 1868 to 1874, and succeeded to the baronetcy on his father's death on 15 May 1877. He resigned his seat in 1878 but was again elected for it in 1886, serving until 1892. However, his contribution to Parliament was minimal. In local affairs he was a harsh landlord who kept his rent levels high, but he was also a great benefactor to local schools as well as the local library and Mechanics' Institute. The second baronet of the second creation of the Stepney baronetcy informally he was considered a continuation of the first and was thus known as the 11th baronet. Around 1880 Sir Arthur's estate measured 9,841 acres in Carmarthenshire (with a rent roll worth 7,047 guineas per year), with six acres in Berkshire, probably the house and garden of their Ascot property Woodend.

== Personal life ==
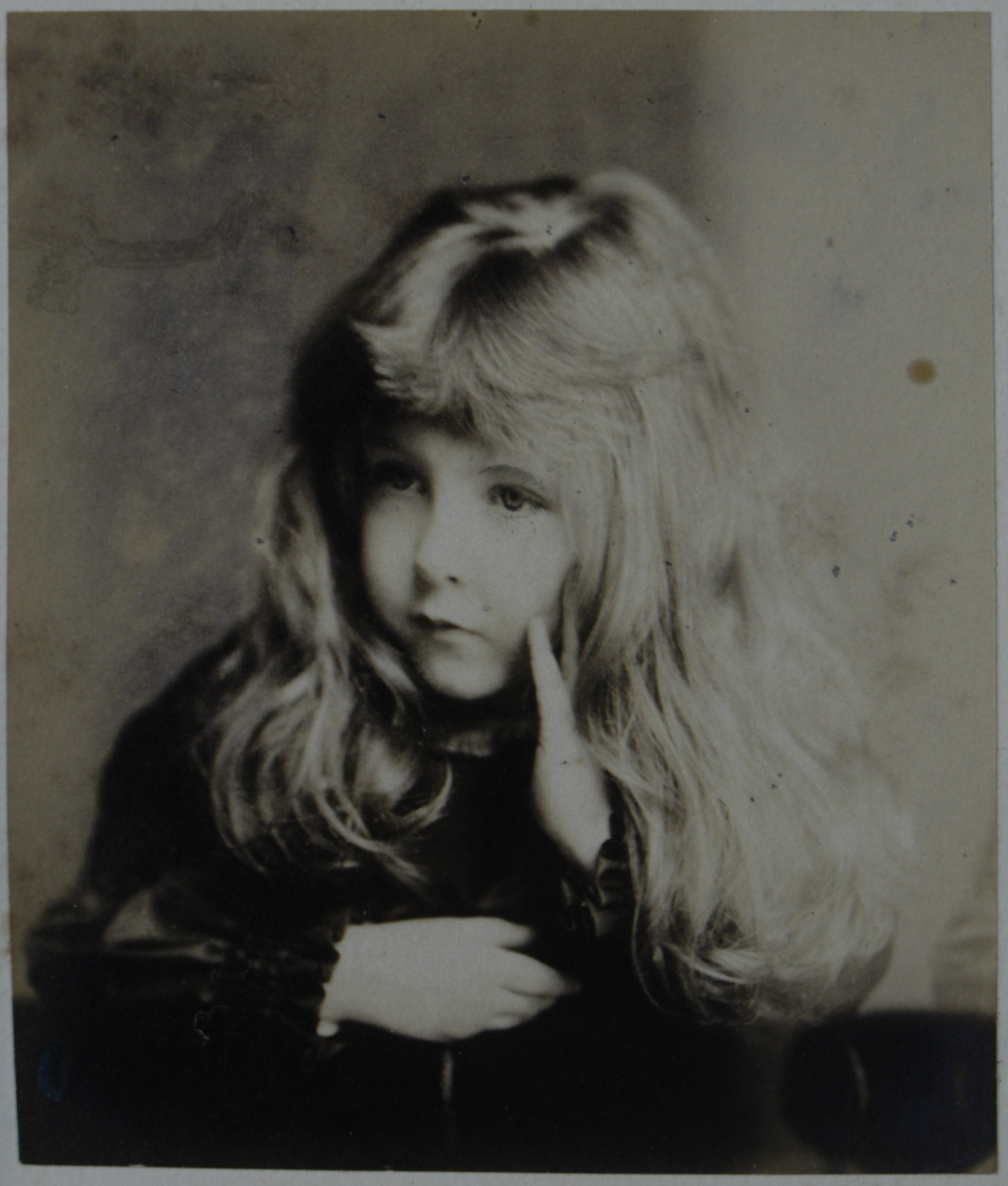
Photo of his daughter and heir: Alcy Cowell-Stepney, circa 1880.

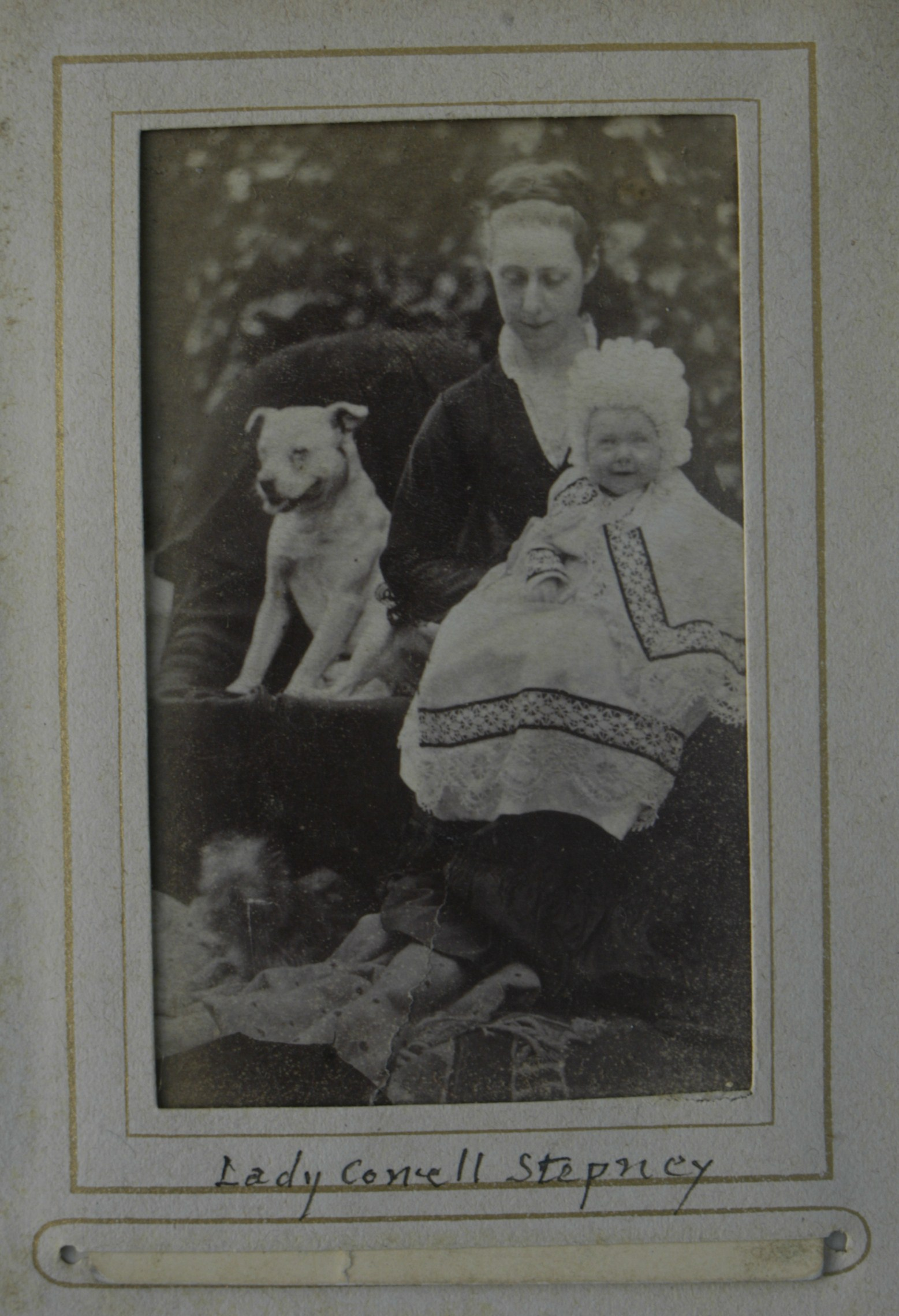
Lady Cowell-Stepney, a Staffordshire Bull Terrier, another dog, and her daughter Catharine Meriel Alcyone (1876–1952), circa 1877. Photo by C. Stephenson of Ascot, Sunninghill.

On 24 August 1875 Arthur married Margaret Warren, fourth daughter of the second Lord De Tabley. Margaret was a close friend and confidante of Mary Drew, née Gladstone, the Prime Minister's daughter. The marriage initially seemed to be happy, and a daughter, Catherine Meriel (informally named 'Alcyone' by her mother) was born on 12 September 1876. (Aged five, Meriel was painted by Millais; she later married Sir Edward Stafford Howard.) Only a few weeks later, though, Arthur abruptly abandoned his wife and daughter, (but one presumes not his clubs, Travellers', Brooks's, Reform and St. James's) and went abroad, beginning a habit of extensive travelling and lengthy sojourns overseas that would last for the rest of his life. Margaret's supporters, including her daughter in later years, believed that Arthur was mentally ill. However, during his time overseas he acquired substantial estates in Australia and Canada (near Enderby, BC, where his estates were managed by George Heggie). He also spent much time in the United States, eventually becoming a citizen and ceasing to use his title. In 1901 he transferred the management of his estates to his daughter Meriel and obtained a divorce in Idaho. In 1903 Lady Stepney finally sued for a judicial separation, which was granted on the grounds that the Idaho divorce had no weight in English law. The extensive newspaper coverage of the case turned it into a media cause celebre of the Edwardian period.

Aged 74, Sir Arthur Cowell-Stepney was found dead on the railway station at Yuma, Arizona, on 2 July 1909, having apparently gone there to try to add a rare butterfly to his collection.

== See also ==
- Stepney family

Parliament of the United Kingdom
Preceded by Charles William Nevill	Member of Parliament for Carmarthen Boroughs; 1876–1878	Succeeded by Benjamin Thomas Williams
Preceded by John Jenkins	Member of Parliament for Carmarthen Boroughs; 1886–1892	Succeeded by Evan Rowland Jones
Baronetage of the United Kingdom
Preceded by John Cowell-Stepney	Baronet (of Llanelly); 1877–1909	Extinct
