= Grade I listed buildings in Carmarthenshire =

Listed buildings in Welsh county

Carmarthenshire shown within Wales

In the United Kingdom, the term listed building refers to a building or other structure officially designated as being of special architectural, historical, or cultural significance; Grade I structures are those considered to be "buildings of exceptional interest". Listing was begun by a provision in the Town and Country Planning Act 1947. Once listed, strict limitations are imposed on the modifications allowed to a building's structure or fittings. In Wales, the authority for listing under the Planning (Listed Buildings and Conservation Areas) Act 1990 rests with Cadw.

== Buildings ==
Name	Location Grid Ref. (Note: Sometimes known as OSGB36, the grid reference is based on the British national grid reference system used by the Ordnance Survey.) Geo-coordinates	Date Listed	Function	Notes	Reference Number	Image
Church of St Margaret Marloes, Eglwyscummin	Eglwyscummin; SN2309010649; 51°45′59″N 4°33′55″W	30 November 1966	Church	Situated in a prominent position on the N side of the B4314, some 2.5km SE of Rhos-goch.	9389	See more images
Llansteffan Castle	Llansteffan; SN3514110148; 51°45′56″N 4°23′26″W	30 November 1966	Castle	Prominently situated on a rocky promontery, overlooking the mouth of the Tywi.	9405	See more images
St Peter's Church, Carmarthen	Carmarthen; SN4152320221; 51°51′29″N 4°18′10″W	18 August 1954	Church	Situated in rounded churchyard at end of King Street.	9435	See more images
Carmarthen Castle	Carmarthen; SN4130820006; 51°51′22″N 4°18′21″W	18 August 1954	Castle	Situated behind buildings on E side of Nott's Square.	9507	See more images
Outer Gatehouse to Laugharne Castle	Laugharne Township; SN3020210794; 51°46′12″N 4°27′44″W	25 September 1986	Gatehouse	At the bottom of the street near the Town Hall, reached by path in front of Castle House.	9652	See more images
Laugharne Castle	Laugharne Township; SN3021710752; 51°46′11″N 4°27′43″W	30 November 1966	Castle	On an elevated coastal site near the Town Hall, reached by path in front of Castle House.	9653	See more images
Newcastle Emlyn Castle	Newcastle Emlyn; SN3114240724; 52°02′21″N 4°27′48″W	5 August 1991	Castle	Sited on a peninsula to W of the town. Pedestrian access from Castle Street.	9716	See more images
Church of St Michael, Cilycwm	Cilycwm; SN7533340029; 52°02′41″N 3°49′09″W	8 July 1966	Church	Situated on E side of village street, in centre of village.	10906	See more images
Plas Taliaris	Manordeilo and Salem; SN6400427984; 51°56′01″N 3°58′46″W	8 July 1966	Hall	Situated 2km NE of Salem.	10911	See more images
Dryslwyn Castle	Llangathen; SN5540320365; 51°51′47″N 4°06′05″W	8 July 1966	Castle	On high ground overlooking the Tywi Valley, to the E of the B4297 and on the N side of the river.	10934	See more images
Church of St Michael, Myddfai	Myddfai; SN7723830139; 51°57′22″N 3°47′16″W	8 July 1966	Church	Situated in rounded churchyard in centre of the village.	10957	See more images
Dolauhirion Bridge	Llandovery; SN7619736098; 52°00′34″N 3°48′19″W	8 March 1966	Bridge	Situated some 1.5km north of Llandovery, carrying road to Cilycwm and Porthrhyd across River Tywi.	10964	See more images
Church of St Mary, Llandovery	Llandovery; SN7698335161; 52°00′04″N 3°47′36″W	8 March 1966	Church	Situated on small hill above the modern A483 in large churchyard.	10967	See more images
Dinefwr Castle	Llandeilo; SN6114921730; 51°52′37″N 4°01′07″W	8 July 1966	Castle	Situated on a rocky, wooded ridge above Afon Tywi.	11117	See more images
Kidwelly Castle	Kidwelly; SN4089707049; 51°44′22″N 4°18′21″W	12 May 1963	Castle	Situated on a bluff above W bank of Gwendraeth Fach, across river from modern town centre.	11876	See more images
Church of Saint Mary, Kidwelly	Kidwelly; SN4084206750; 51°44′12″N 4°18′23″W	12 May 1963	Church	Situated in centre of Kidwelly in large walled churchyard.	11878	See more images
Llanelly House (2 Bridge Street)	Llanelli; SN5067300503; 51°41′00″N 4°09′41″W	17 June 1966	House	Situated on corner of Vaughan Street and Bridge Street, facing Parish Church.	11892	See more images
Llanelly House (4 Bridge Street)	Llanelli; SN5068000503; 51°41′00″N 4°09′41″W	17 June 1966	House	Situated on corner of Vaughan Street and Bridge Street, facing Parish Church.	11893	See more images
Llanelly House, rear wing (20 Vaughan Street)	Llanelli; SN5066900489; 51°41′00″N 4°09′41″W	17 June 1966	House	Situated on corner of Vaughan Street and Bridge Street, facing Parish Church.	11894	Llanelly House, rear wing (20 Vaughan Street)
Llanelly House, rear wing (22 Vaughan Street)	Llanelli; SN5066800496; 51°41′00″N 4°09′41″W	17 June 1966	House	Situated on corner of Vaughan Street and Bridge Street, facing Parish Church.	11895	Upload Photo
Llanelly House (24 Vaughan Street)	Llanelli; SN5066700502; 51°41′00″N 4°09′41″W	17 June 1966	House	Situated on corner of Vaughan Street and Bridge Street, facing Parish Church.	11896	Upload Photo
Dolauhirion Bridge	Cilycwm; SN7620636100; 52°00′34″N 3°48′18″W	8 March 1966	Bridge	Situated some 1.5km north of Llandovery, carrying road to Cilycwm and Porthrhyd across River Tywi.	16996	See more images
Carreg Cennen Castle	Dyffryn Cennen; SN6681419093; 51°51′16″N 3°56′07″W	24 November 1998	Castle	Spectacularly set on a crag over the upper Cennen valley, approached from Carreg Cennen Farm, about 1.5 km E of Trap.	20923	See more images

== See also ==
- Grade II* listed buildings in Carmarthenshire
- Listed buildings in Wales
- Registered historic parks and gardens in Carmarthenshire
