= John Graham Chambers =

Welsh sports administrator (1843-1883)

Personal information
- Born: 12 February 1843 Llanelli, Carmarthenshire, Wales
- Died: 4 March 1883 (aged 40) Earls Court, London, England

John Graham Chambers (12 February 1843 – 4 March 1883) was a Welsh sportsman. He rowed for Cambridge, founded inter-varsity sports, became English Champion walker, coached four winning Boat-Race crews, devised the Queensberry Rules, staged the Cup Final and the Thames Regatta, instituted championships for billiards, boxing, cycling, wrestling and athletics, rowed beside Matthew Webb as he swam the English Channel and edited a national newspaper.

== Early life ==
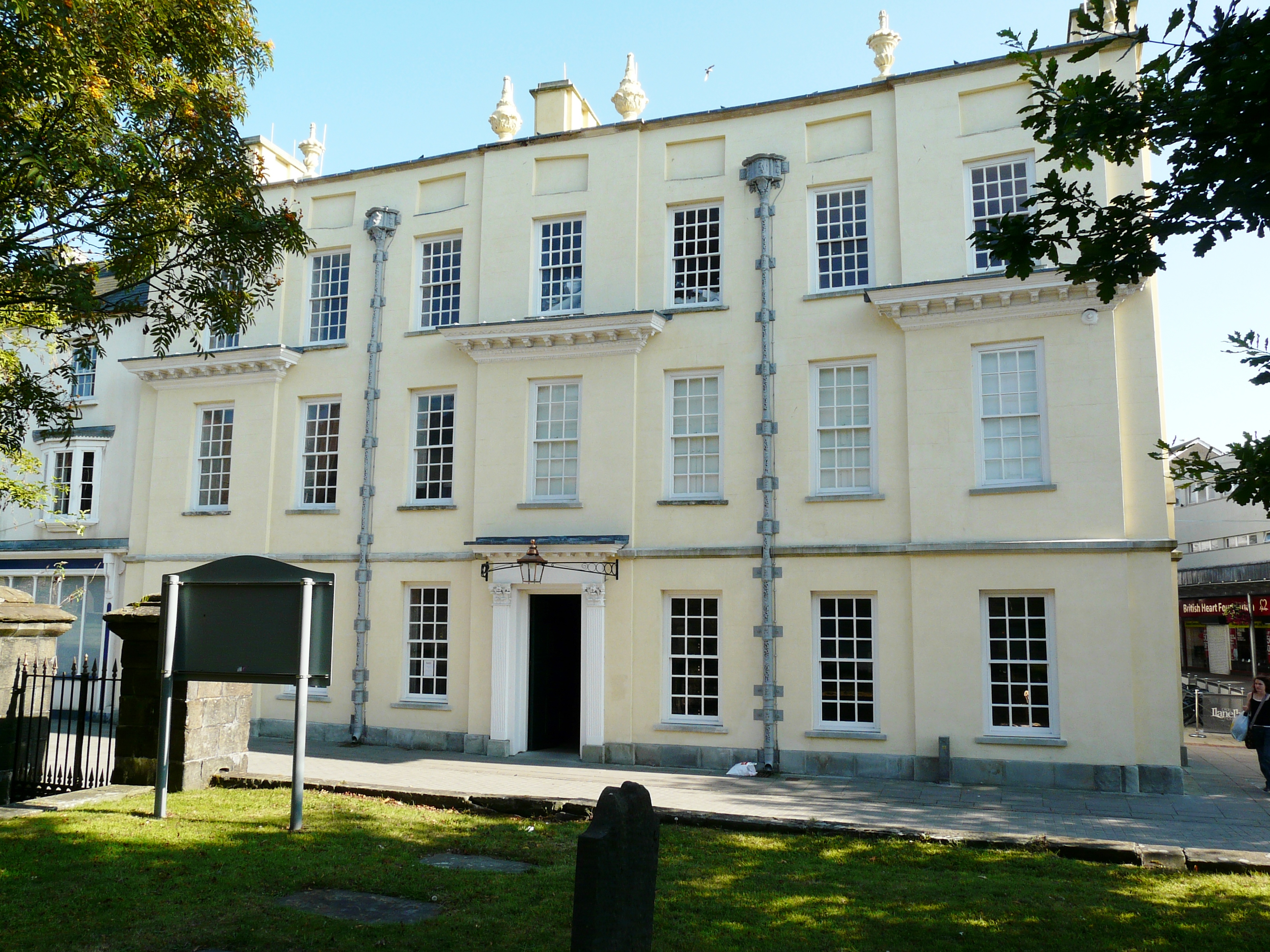
Llanelly House, Chambers's birthplace

Chambers was born in Llanelly House in the town of Llanelli, Carmarthenshire, Wales. He was the son of William Chambers, a Welsh landowner of the Chambers family. He was educated at Eton and Trinity College, Cambridge, where he graduated as B.A., won the Colquhoun Sculls and became President of the University Boat Club.

== Career ==
Chambers codified the "Marquess of Queensberry rules" upon which modern-day boxing is based. In 1867, he established the rules, which include the required use of boxing gloves, the ten-count, and three-minute rounds. He is a member of the International Boxing Hall of Fame.

He was also a catalyst in the founding of British amateur athletics, having founded the Amateur Athletic Club in 1866, and was present at the formation of the Amateur Athletic Association in 1880. In 1866, he won the 7 miles walk event at the inaugural 1866 AAC Championships.

Chambers also rowed twice in the Boat Race for Cambridge in 1862 and 1863, losing both times, and coached six Light Blues crews in 1865–66, again defeats, and 1871–74 when Cambridge put together four straight victories, including the first on sliding seats in 1873.

== Later life ==
Chambers died, aged 40, at 10 Wetherby Terrace, Earls Court, London on 4 March 1883 and is buried in Brompton Cemetery.
