= John Stepney =

John Stepney may refer to:

- Sir John Stepney, 1st Baronet (c. 1581–1624) of the Stepney baronets
- Sir John Stepney, 3rd Baronet, Royalist MP
- Sir John Stepney, 4th Baronet (c. 1632–c. 1681) of the Stepney baronets
- Sir John Stepney, 6th Baronet (1693–1748) of the Stepney baronets
- Sir John Stepney, 8th Baronet, MP
