= Cowell-Stepney baronets =

Extinct baronetcy in the Baronetage of the United Kingdom

- Escutcheon of the Cowell-Stepney Baronets of Llanelly
- Creation date: 1871
- Status: extinct
- Extinction date: 1909
- Motto: Facta probant, Deeds prove us (Stepney); Quo fata vocant, Whither the fates call (Cowell)

The Cowell-Stepney Baronetcy, of Llanelli in the County of Carmarthen, was a title in the Baronetage of the United Kingdom. It was created on 22 September 1871 for John Cowell-Stepney, Member of Parliament for Carmarthen. Born John Cowell, he was the son of Andrew Cowell and Maria Justina Stepney, sister of Sir John Stepney, 8th Baronet, of Prendergast (see Stepney baronets), and assumed the additional surname of Stepney on succeeding to the Stepney estates. The second Baronet also represented Carmarthen in Parliament. The title became extinct on his death in 1909.

== Cowell-Stepney baronets, of Llanelly (1871) ==
- Sir John Stepney Cowell-Stepney, 1st Baronet (1791–1877)
  - William Frederick Ross Cowell Stepney (1821–1872)
- Sir (Emile Algernon) Arthur Keppell Cowell-Stepney, 2nd Baronet (1834–1909), died without heir.

== See also ==
- Stepney baronets
- Stepney family
- Lady Howard-Stepney
