= Benjamin Thomas Williams =

Welsh barrister and politician

Benjamin Thomas Williams (19 November 1832 – 21 March 1890) was a Welsh barrister, judge, and Liberal Party politician who sat in the House of Commons from 1878 to 1882.

== Early life ==
Williams was the eldest son of Thomas Rayson Williams, an Independent minister of Narberth Pembrokeshire, and his wife Mira Thomas, daughter of B R Thomas. He was educated at the Presbyterian College, Carmarthen (1846-1851), where he became a Unitarian, and Glasgow University (B.A. 1853, M.A. 1854), where he was senior prizeman in logic and silver medallist in metaphysics. In 1859, he was called to the bar at Gray's Inn and then went on the South Wales and Chester circuits. He was Recorder of Carmarthen from 1872 to 1878 and became a Queen's Counsel in 1875. He was for a while editor of the Law Magazine and was a J.P. for Pembrokeshire, chairman of the South Narberth School Board, and member of the councils of the University of Glasgow and the University College of Wales.

In 1867, Williams sought to be nominated as a candidate for the second seat for Merthyr Boroughs and held a public meeting at Aberdare to support his candidature. He protested against the actions of Thomas Price in using this meeting to promote the candidature of Richard Fothergill.

== MP for Carmarthen Boroughs ==
In 1876, Williams was briefly mentioned as a potential Liberal candidate for Carmarthen Boroughs (a constituency which included Carmarthen and Llanelly) following the resignation of Charles Nevill. However, there seems to have been little prospect of his contesting the seat on this occasion and the choice fell in a matter of days upon Arthur Cowell-Stepney, heir to the extensive Stepney family estates in Carmarthenshire.

In May 1878 Williams was elected as a Liberal at an unopposed by-election as the Member of Parliament (MP) for Carmarthen Boroughs. He was re-elected as a Liberal in 1880, with a majority of 110 votes, after a bitter contest against the tinplate magnate John Jones Jenkins, who stood as an Independent Liberal. He resigned from Parliament in 1882 to become a county court judge, but retired as a judge three years later, due to failing health.

At the Carmarthen Boroughs bye-election in January 1882 caused by Ben T Williams's resignation, John Jones Jenkins was elected unopposed as a Liberal, and held the seat as a Liberal in the 1885 General Election; Jenkins subsequently contested the seat as a Liberal Unionist, losing to the Liberal candidate in 1886 and 1892; regaining the seat as a Liberal Unionist in 1895, before losing it again to the Liberal candidate in 1900.

Ben T. Williams died on 21 March 1890, at the age of 57, at the Joint Counties Lunatic Asylum, Carmarthen.

Williams married Margaret John, daughter of T John of Dolemain, Pembrokeshire, on 20 August 1857, in Gretna Green, after establishing a domicile in Scotland of 21 days in accordance with the Marriage (Scotland) Act 1856.

Parliament of the United Kingdom
Preceded by Sir Arthur Cowell-Stepney, Bt	Member of Parliament for Carmarthen Boroughs; 1878 – 1882	Succeeded by John Jones Jenkins
