= William Chambers (Welsh politician) =

Welsh politician (1809-1882)

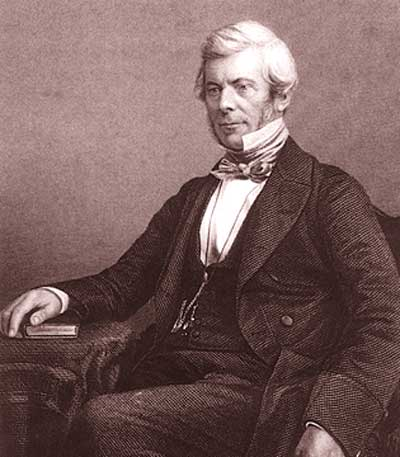
William Chambers

William Chambers (24 May 1809 – 21 March 1882), was a Welsh politician, the illegitimate son of the industrialist William Chambers of Llanelli, and a member of the Chambers family.

William Chambers the younger was born in Valenciennes, France, but was educated in England, first at Eton College and then at St John's College, Cambridge. In 1839 he co-founded the Llanelly Reform Society. He was the leader of a demonstration at Mynydd Sylen in August 1843, during the Rebecca Riots, but shortly afterwards he helped the authorities to capture rioters who attacked the toll-gate at Pontarddulais. In 1850, he was the first chairman of the Llanelli Board of Health.
