= 23rd Regiment of (Light) Dragoons =

British Army cavalry regiment

The 23rd Light Dragoons was a cavalry regiment of the British Army which existed several times.

== 1st existence ==
It was created in 1781 as the 23rd Regiment of (Light) Dragoons by Sir John Burgoyne, Bt. at Bedford but renumbered in 1786 as the 19th Regiment of (Light) Dragoons.

== 2nd existence ==
It was re-raised in 1794 by Colonel William Fullarton but disbanded a short time later in 1802.

== 3rd existence ==
It was reformed a third time on 10 March 1803 by re-numbering the 26th Light Dragoons, and served in Spain, Egypt and at Waterloo, before being disbanded at Radipole Barracks on 24 November 1817. The 26th Light Dragoons had been raised in 1795 by Major-General Russell Manners.

Notable officers who served in the regiment include Frederick Ponsonby, Sir William Payne-Gallwey, 1st Baronet, Joseph Muter and Henry Fane.

=== Battle Honours ===
Battle honours were: Talavera, Peninsula, Egypt, Waterloo

=== Regimental Colonels ===
Colonels of the regiment were:

26th Regiment of (Light) Dragoons (formed 1795, Jamaica)

- 1795–1800: Gen. Russell Manners
- 1800–1804: Gen. Sir John Floyd, Bt.

23rd Regiment of (Light) Dragoons (1803)

- 1804–1807: Gen. William Cartwright
- 1807–1814: Gen. Sir William Payne, Bt.
- 1814: Gen. Sir Henry Fane, GCB
- 1814–?1817: Gen. Sir George Anson, GCB
