= David Lewis (British MP) =

Welsh politician (died 1872)

David Lewis (died 1872) was a former MP in Wales, representing Carmarthen constituency.

He was elected in the 1835 general election, narrowly defeating the sitting Whig member, William Henry Yelverton. Lewis was defeated in the next election in 1837. Lewis was regarded as a nominee of the former member, John Jones of Ystrad, and his defeat was portrayed as a defeat for his mentor.

Lewis never contributed in parliament. Following his defeat he never stood for Parliament again.

Parliament of the United Kingdom
Preceded by William Henry Yelverton	Member of Parliament for Carmarthen; 1835 - 1837	Succeeded by David Morris
