= William Morris (British politician) =

British politician (1811–1877)

William Morris MP JP

Member of Parliament for Carmarthen Boroughs
- In office 31 October 1864 – 18 November 1868
- Preceded by: David Morris
- Succeeded by: John Cowell-Stepney

Personal details
- Born: 1811
- Died: 25 February 1877 (aged 66)
- Party: Liberal

William Morris (1811 – 25 February 1877) was a British Liberal Party politician and banker.

Morris was active in the public life of Carmarthen for many years before his election to Parliament and served as mayor of the borough on four occasions.

Morris was elected MP for Carmarthen Boroughs at a by-election in 1864, after his cousin David Morris died in office. Although there was speculation about several other possible candidates, requisitions inviting Morris to fill the vacancy appeared almost immediately after the former member's funeral.

He then held the seat until 1868 when he did not stand for re-election.

Morris also served as a Justice of the Peace for Carmarthenshire and Carmarthen, and a High Sheriff of Carmarthenshire in 1858.

Morris remained active in local government and became a member of the Carmarthen School Board. He died in February 1877.

Parliament of the United Kingdom
Preceded by David Morris	Member of Parliament for Carmarthen Boroughs; 1864–1868	Succeeded by John Cowell-Stepney
