= Russell Manners (British Army officer) =

British Army officer (1736–1800)

Russell Manners (1736 – 11 September 1800) was a British Army officer.

== Biography ==
The fourth illegitimate son of Lord William Manners, Russell Manners joined the Army as a cornet in the Royal Regiment of Horse Guards in May 1755, and became a captain in the 7th Dragoons in February 1758. In April 1760 he was promoted lieutenant-colonel of the 21st Dragoons (Royal Foresters), serving in Germany under Prince Ferdinand of Brunswick. When his regiment was disbanded on the Peace of Paris in 1763 he was appointed lieutenant-colonel of the 2nd Dragoon Guards.

After the American Revolutionary War broke out in 1775 Manners was appointed colonel of the newly raised 19th Regiment of (Light) Dragoons. He was promoted to major-general in 1777 and lieutenant-general in 1782; in 1783 his regiment was disbanded. Manners was made colonel of the 86th Regiment of Foot on 20 June 1794 and transferred to the 26th Light Dragoons in 1795. He was promoted to general in 1799.

This officer is sometimes identified as the General Manners who shot a highwayman to death during an attempted robbery on 23 May 1800; in fact this was Major-General Robert Manners.

General Russell Manners died on 11 September 1800 at Billericay in Essex. He had been staying at Southend for his health, and feeling unwell during his morning ride had set out for London alone to get medical advice. Stopping at an inn, he told the landlord he would never reach London and would die there, which he did, his family having been summoned from London to be present at his deathbed. He was succeeded by his son, Russell Manners (died 1840).

Military offices
Preceded by Sir Cornelius Cuyler	Colonel of the 86th Regiment of Foot; 1794–1795	Succeeded by William Grinfield
New post	Colonel of the 26th Light Dragoons; 1795–1800	Succeeded by Sir John Floyd
