= Stepney baronets =

Extinct baronetcy in the Baronetage of England

- Escutcheon of the Stepney Baronets of Prendergast
- Creation date: 1621
- Status: extinct
- Extinction date: 1825

The Stepney Baronetcy, of Prendergast in the County of Pembroke, was a title in the Baronetage of England. It was created on 24 November 1621 for John Stepney. His son, Sir John, the third Baronet represented Pembroke and Haverfordwest in Parliament. The latter's nephew, the fourth Baronet, married Justina, daughter of Sir Anthony van Dyck. Their only son, Sir Thomas, the fifth Baronet, sat as Member of Parliament for Carmarthenshire. Sir Thomas's great-grandson, Sir John, the eighth Baronet, represented Monmouth in Parliament and served as Envoy to Dresden and Berlin. The eighth Baronet never married and was succeeded by his younger brother, Sir Thomas, the ninth Baronet, on whose death in 1825 the baronetcy became extinct.

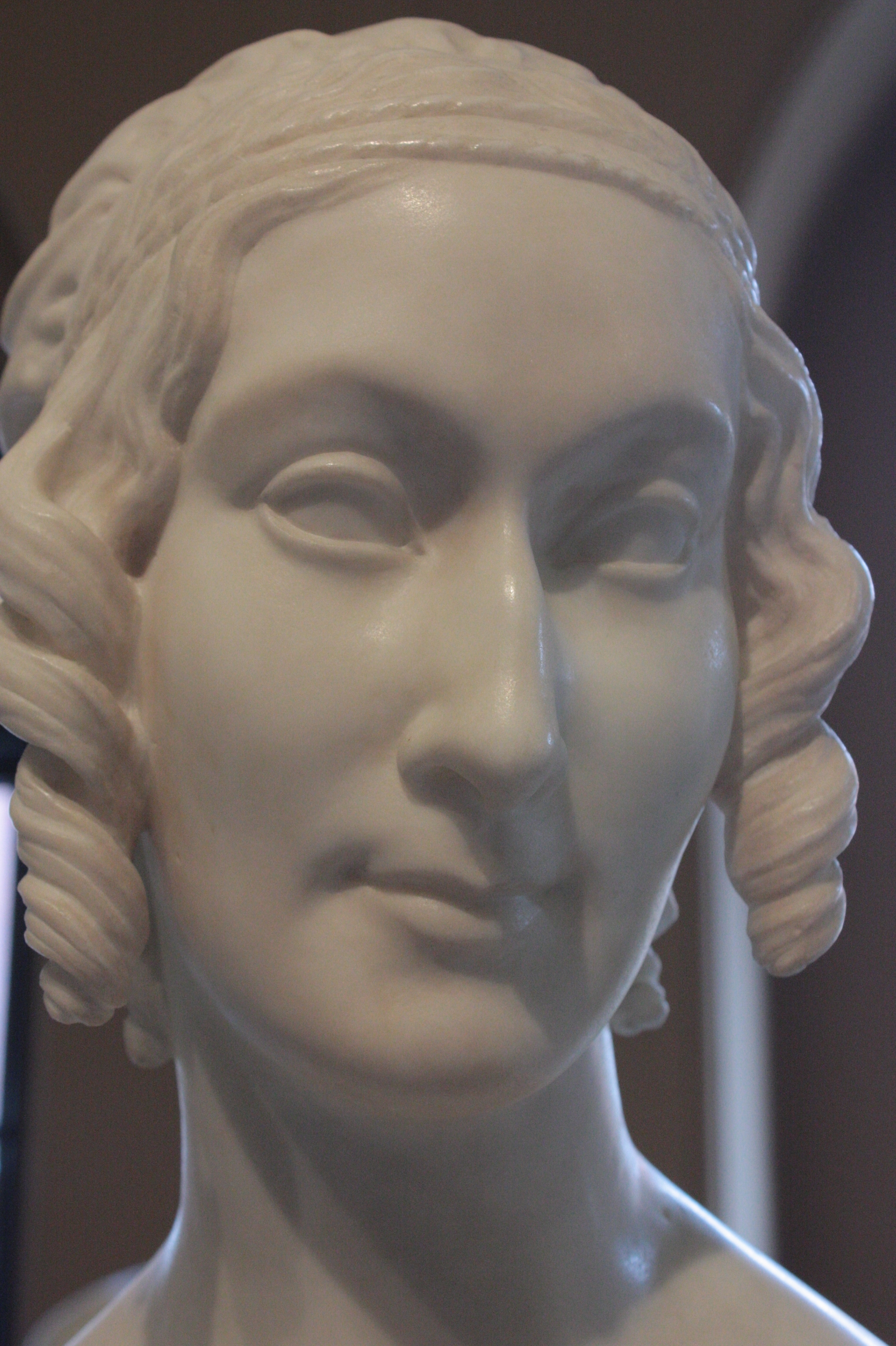
Catherine, Lady Stepney, posing as Cleopatra; by Richard Cockle Lucas, Victoria and Albert Museum

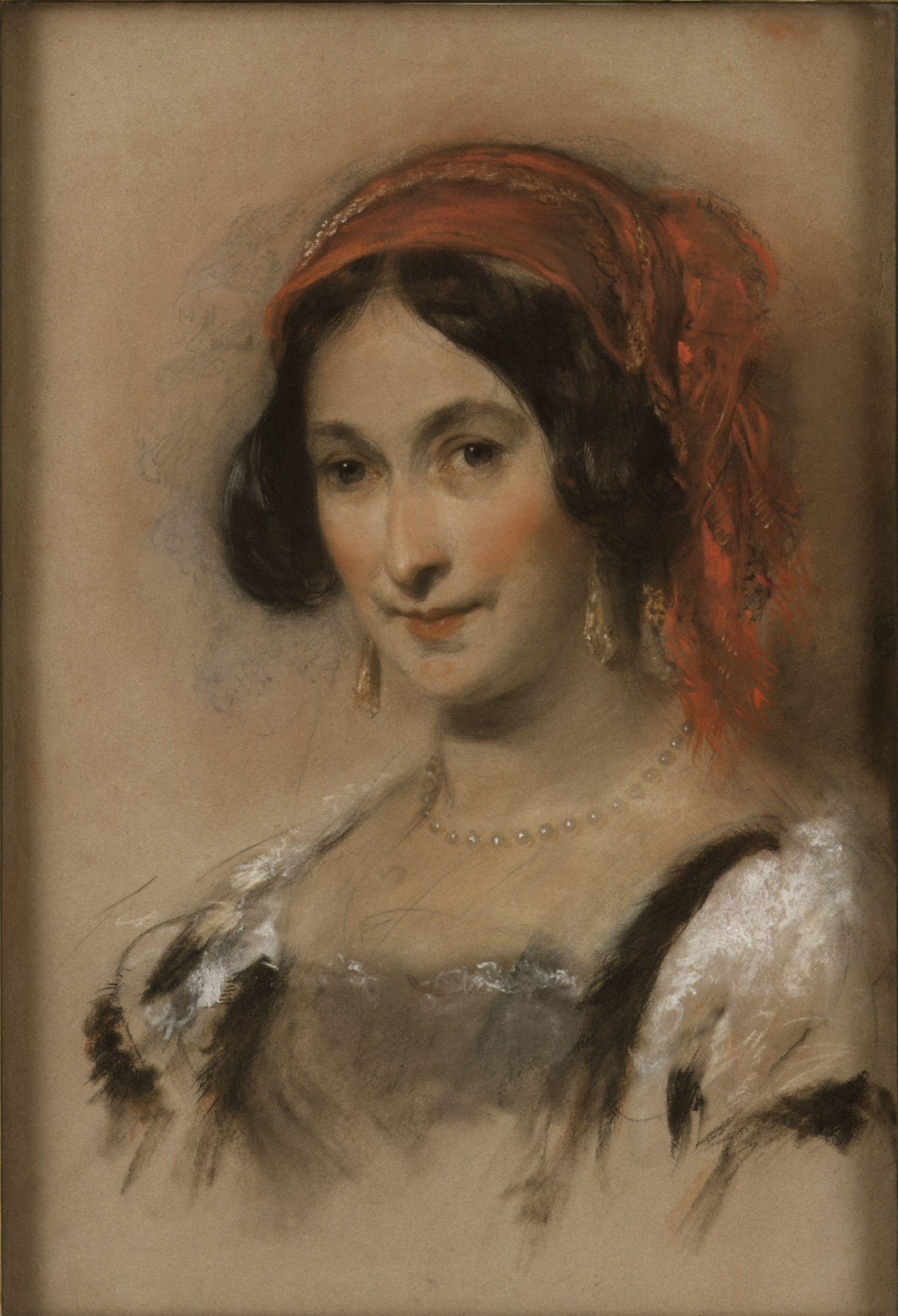
Portrait of Catherine, Lady Stepney, by John Hayter

Catherine, Lady Stepney was the wife of the ninth and last Baronet. She was an author of works of fiction. The Victoria & Albert Museum has a bust of the London society hostess, Catherine, Lady Stepney, posing as Cleopatra.

== Stepney baronets, of Prendergast (1621) ==
- Sir John Stepney, 1st Baronet (c. 1581–1624)
- Sir Alban Stepney, 2nd Baronet (died c. 1628)
- Sir John Stepney, 3rd Baronet (died c. 1650)
- Sir John Stepney, 4th Baronet (c. 1632–c. 1681)
- Sir Thomas Stepney, 5th Baronet (c. 1668–1745)
- Sir John Stepney, 6th Baronet (1693–1748)
- Sir Thomas Stepney, 7th Baronet (1729–1772)
- Sir John Stepney, 8th Baronet (1743–1811)
- Sir Thomas Stepney, 9th Baronet (1760–1825)

== Extended family ==
Maria Justina Stepney, sister of the eighth and ninth Baronets, married Andrew Cowell. Their son John Cowell succeeded to the Stepney estates, assumed the additional surname of Stepney and was created a baronet in 1871 (see Cowell-Stepney baronets).

== See also ==
- Cowell-Stepney baronets
- Stepney family
