= John Cowell-Stepney =

British politician (1791–1877)

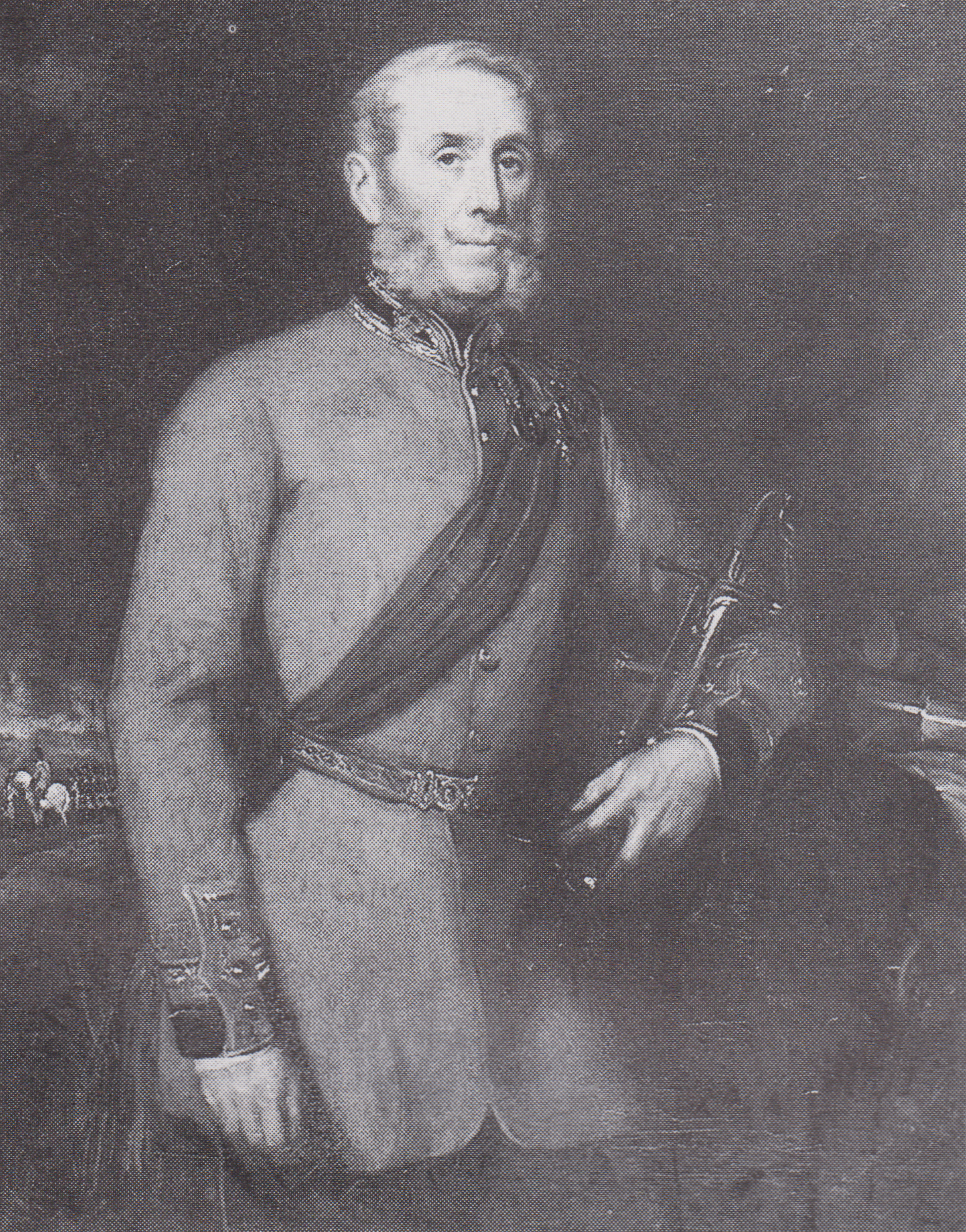

Sir John Stepney Cowell-Stepney, 1st Baronet, KH (1791–1877) was a British soldier, landowner and politician. He was the elder of the two sons of General Andrew Cowell (d. 1821), originally of Coleshill, Buckinghamshire, and his wife Maria Justina (d. 1821), youngest daughter of Sir Thomas Stepney, 7th baronet of Prendergast, Pembrokeshire, and Llanelly House, Carmarthenshire. He was known as [John] Stepney Cowell until he inherited the Stepney family's estates in 1857 under the terms of the will of his uncle, Sir John Stepney, 8th baronet, when he changed the family's name to Cowell-Stepney .

== Military career and personal life ==
Cowell joined his father's regiment, the Coldstream Guards, and fought in the Peninsular War at Fuentes de Oñoro, Ciudad Rodrigo, Salamanca and Vittoria. Cowell subsequently wrote a memoir of his experiences in the war . He fought at the Battle of Quatre Bras in 1815 but an attack of dysentery led him to miss the Battle of Waterloo. Peacetime postings included France, Manchester, Gibraltar and Malta. He was promoted to lieutenant-colonel in 1830.

Cowell married Mary Anne Annesley at Antwerp on 5 July 1820. She was the daughter of the Hon. Robert Annesley, and they had one son, William Frederick Ross Cowell[-Stepney], born on 31 May 1821. However, Mary Anne died at Nice on 9 November 1821. On 19 November 1823 Cowell married Euphemia Jemima Murray (d. 1874), daughter of John Murray of Glenalla, Co. Donegal and sister of General Freeman Murray, governor of Bermuda 1854-9 and 1860–1. They had two sons, [James Charles] Murray Cowell (1824–54) and Sir [Emile Algernon] Arthur [Keppel] Cowell-Stepney, 2nd baronet (1834–1909). Murray Cowell served as a page to both King William IV and Queen Victoria before following his father into the Coldstream Guards. He was swiftly promoted to Colonel but was killed at Inkerman on 5 November 1854. A large memorial to him and the other Coldstream officers killed in the battle was erected in St Paul's Cathedral; a smaller version of it was placed in Llanelli parish church .

== Inheritance and political career ==
In December 1857 Cowell inherited the substantial Carmarthenshire estates of the Stepney family, having been engaged in litigation about it for many years with the former incumbents, the Chambers family. He chose not to live in Llanelly House, which was let for commercial purposes, and he allowed the construction of many new streets, shops and houses on his land in an attempt to boost his income. He was thus largely responsible for much of the present layout of Llanelli and chose the names of many of its streets, which reflected his family's connections and careers: for example, Stepney Street, Murray Street, Salamanca Road, Glenalla Road, Inkerman Street. A somewhat eccentric and disagreeable figure (Queen Victoria detested him ), Cowell gained the nickname of 'Old Whalebone' .

In 1864 Stepney was briefly mentioned as a potential candidate for the parliamentary vacancy in the Carmarthen Boroughs, but he withdrew in favour of William Morris, a cousin of the late member, David Morris. Prior to the 1868 General Election, William Morris announced his retirement and Colonel Cowell-Stepney, as he had now become, was elected Liberal MP for Carmarthen Boroughs at the age of seventy-seven. He made little impact in Parliament, although he spoke out against religious education in schools and opposed electoral intimidation by other Welsh landlords .

He was the publisher of the Social Economist which published an abridged version of the Communist Manifesto in August and September 1869. This coincided with Cowell-Stepney attending the Basle Congress of the International Workingmen's Association in September 1869, where he was a delegate of the General Council.

He retired in 1874. On 22 September 1871 Prime Minister Gladstone, a family friend, created a new baronetcy for Cowell-Stepney. He died on 15 May 1877 and is buried with his wife in Kensal Green Cemetery.

Parliament of the United Kingdom
Preceded by William Morris	Member of Parliament for Carmarthen Boroughs; 1868 – 1874	Succeeded by Charles William Nevill
Baronetage of the United Kingdom
New creation	Baronet (of Llanelly); 1871–1877	Succeeded by Sir Arthur Cowell-Stepney
