= David Morris (Whig politician) =

British politician

Member of Parliament for Carmarthen Boroughs
- In office 24 July 1837 – 30 September 1864
- Preceded by: David Lewis
- Succeeded by: William Morris

Personal details
- Born: 1800
- Died: 30 September 1864 (aged 63–64)
- Party: Whig

David Morris (1800 – 30 September 1864) was a British Whig and Liberal politician, and banker.

== Early life ==
The eldest son of banker William Morris, he spent his early life working in the family firm, Morris and Sons of Carmarthen. He retired from the firm at a young age having amassed a substantial personal fortune.

== Parliamentary career ==
At the 1835 General Election, the Carmarthen Boroughs constituency had been captured by the Conservative candidate, David Lewis, who defeated the former member, W.H. Yelverton of Whitland Abbey, who had held the seat from 1832 until 1835. As the prospect of a new general election became more likely in January 1837, Morris issued an address declaring his intention to offer himself as a candidate, in opposition to Lewis, in response to a requisition from many of his friends and colleagues. During the following weeks, it was alleged that efforts were being made, notably by the Carmarthen Journal, to persuade Yeleverton, the previous member, to oppose Morris on the grounds that his political views were too radical.

Although Morris held broadly Liberal views his political opinions were subordinated by his belief that his first duty was to represent his constituents, and in this regard he was a diligent member of the Commons who was rarely absent from divisions.

Having been elected in 1837 he never again faced a contested election. He was re-elected unopposed in 1841. On this occasion he declared in his speech accepting the nomination for a further term that he had sought to represent the sentiments of the electors by voting for reductions in the civil list payments to the royal family, in favour of abolishing flogging in the army, the total abolition of slavery and the mitigation of the most drastic impacts of the Poor Law legislation.

In 1847, Morris returned to Carmarthen at the start of the election campaign and was welcomed with festivities and celebrations. He was again returned unopposed. At the next election in 1852, Morris was again returned by acclamation.

As reported in 1857, opposition was regarded as being "perfectly useless" due to his popularity in the boroughs. Morris attracted support from a wide range of groups within the constituency including nonconformists. However, when a toast to dissenting ministers was offered at a dinner celebrating his return in 1857 no dissenting minister was present to acknowledge it. During his later years, Morris moved closer to supporting the radical wing of the Liberal Party, including the extension of the franchise, introducing the secret ballot and the abolition of church rates.

In 1859 a portrait of Morris was presented to the Carmarthen Corporation. By the end of his career he was considered a Liberal from 1859, and held the seat until his death in 1864.

In 1860, following the death of the first Earl Cawdor, Morris it was immediately speculated that he was as a potential candidate for Lord Lieutenant of Carmarthenshire. However, Lord Emlyn, who succeeded his father as Earl of Cawdor also inherited the lord lieutenancy.

Outside of Parliament, Morris was also a Justice of the Peace for Carmarthenshire.

=== Death and legacy ===
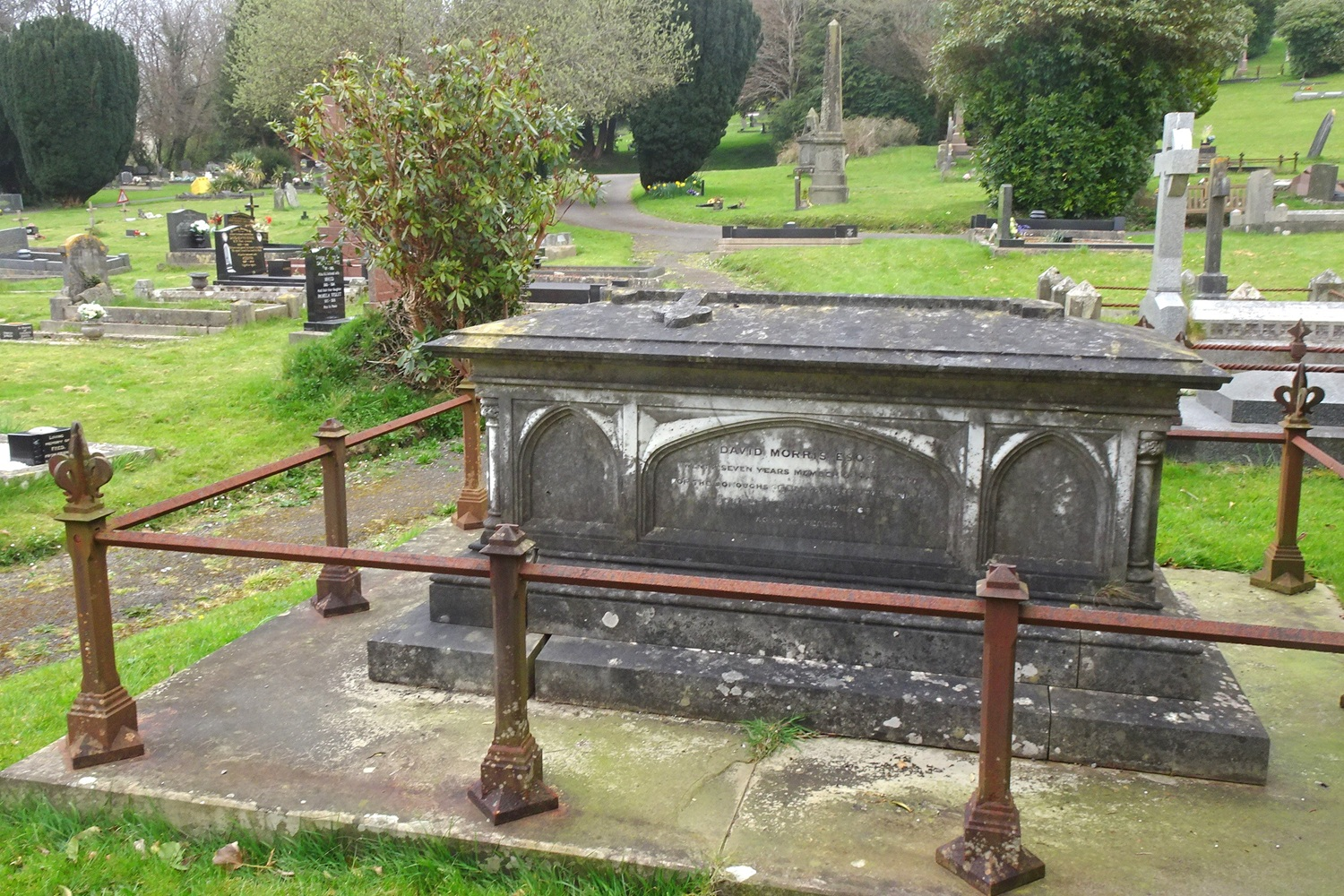
Tomb of David Morris in Carmarthen Cemetery

On 20 September 1864, Morris attended a ceremony at Llanelli to lay the foundation stone for a new Market Hall and the following day attended a meeting of the Carmarthenshire Agricultural Society. He retired as usual that evening but by morning was found to be seriously ill. Within a few days, he was dead.

Upon his death, supporters and opponents alike praised his diligence as a member. His funeral at Carmarthen was reported to be the largest since the death of John Jones of Ystrad, a former MP for Carmarthenshire, in 1842. A procession consisting of around eight hundred people accompanied the hearse from Morris's residence in King Street to the public cemetery.

David Morris bequeathed substantial sums to charities, including £2000 to the poor of Carmarthen, £1000 to the poor of Llanelli and £500 to Carmarthen Infirmary. A David Morris Charity operated until the 1990s. The rest of his substantial fortune, said to amount to £250,000, was divided between his cousins, Thomas Charles Morris of Bryn Myrddyn and William Morris of Cwm. William Morris succeeded him as MP for Carmarthen Boroughs.

Parliament of the United Kingdom
Preceded by David Lewis	Member of Parliament for Carmarthen Boroughs; 1837–1864	Succeeded by William Morris
