= Parc Howard Museum =

Museum in Carmarthenshire, Wales

Parc Howard
- Bryn-y-caerau
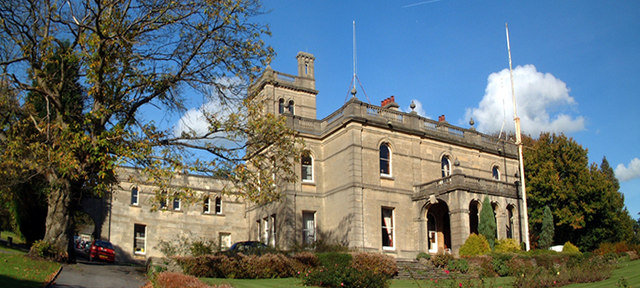
- Interactive map of the Parc Howard area

General information
- Status: Open, museum and civic park
- Architectural style: Italianate
- Location: Llanelli, Wales
- Coordinates: 51.6894°N 4.1600°W
- Construction started: 1882
- Opened: 1886
- Renovated: 1912
- Client: John Buckley
- Owner: Carmarthenshire County Council

Design and construction
- Architect: James Buckley-Wilson

Other information
- Parking: Restricted and by prior arrangement

Website
- Parc Howard Museum & Art Gallery

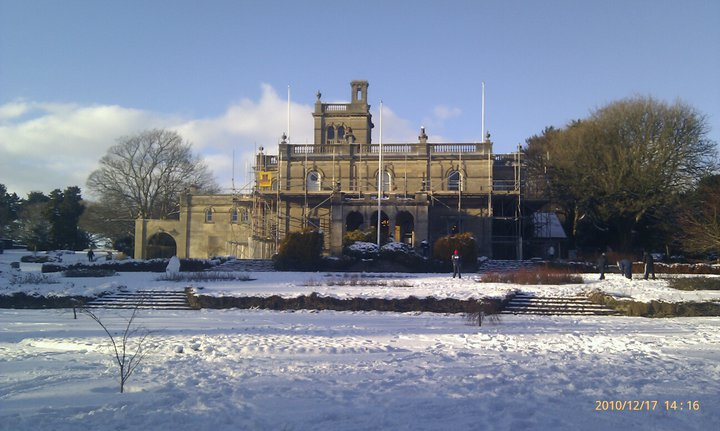

Parc Howard Museum & Art Gallery is a museum in a 19th-century Italianate country house, situated in 24 acres (9.7 ha) of parkland, north of the town centre of Llanelli in Carmarthenshire, Wales. The park is registered on the Cadw/ICOMOS Register of Parks and Gardens of Special Historic Interest in Wales.

== History ==
The lands originally were home to a far older property, Bryn-y-caerau. In 1559, St Albans lawyer Alban Stepney married into the family of Richard Davies, Bishop of St Davids. On 31 December 1561, the bishop appointed Stepney as receiver-general of the Diocese of St Davids. Stepney also served as its registrar. From this point, Stepney and his descendants built up the Welsh branch of the Stepney family, and their associated estate.

By the early 1800s, part of the original Stepney estate which surrounded Llanelli had been purchased by Mr R. T. Howell, a local business man, Harbour Commissioner, and member of the local Health Board. After Howell's death in 1853, the property passed through his will to James Buckley Wilson, the son of architect James Wilson, and grandson of the Rev. James Buckley. Based in Bath, Somerset, Wilson had no need for such a grand house, and agreed a 99-year lease to his cousin James Buckley (1838–95).

Under the terms of the lease, Buckley commissioned his cousin to design a new large scale addition to the house. However, still wanting more space and to express his money and influence, Buckley recommissioned his cousin in 1882 to undertake a more extensive reconstruction to create the present Italiante style mock-castle in Bath stone, known on opening in 1886 as Brynycaerau Castle.

Originally orientated south-west, Buckley-Wilson reorientated the entrance to the south-east to overlook the earlier structures grounds, the surrounding countryside towards the River Loughor estuary, and onwards towards the sea. He added a central three arched porte cochère (carriage porch) to accommodate the new drive, and the two small symmetrical supporting side extensions with projecting bays. All except the rear elevation are symmetrical, achieved by extending the northwest wing and reconfiguring the out buildings; on all the corners the quoins stand proud. There are square headed windows on the ground floor, and arched windows above. The house is topped by a low pitched slate roof to give a castle-like feel on approach, behind parapets with balustrades and urn finials. There is also a tall belvedere tower rising at the rear. Remodelling the gardens, behind the house sat a kitchen garden with 8 metres (26 ft) pergola and associated small orchard, with access to glasshouses, stables and coachhouse beyond (now converted to council offices and storage). The lodge that was to the south-east of the house has now been demolished. Buckley-Wilson was so proud of the finished structure that it formed part of his application to be admitted as a fellow of the Royal Institute of British Architects.

In 1911, after the deaths of both James Buckley and James Buckley-Wilson, Llanelli Urban Council were looking to secure Parc Howard for development as a civic park and museum. However, the property was in need of extensive renovation and modernisation, and the council budget could not stretch financially to both purchase and renovation. After Sir Arthur Cowell-Stepney died in 1909 in Yuma, Arizona, his daughter, Katherine Meriel Cowell-Stepney, inherited the Stepney estate. In 1911, she became the second wife of the noted Liberal politician Sir Stafford Howard. In January 1912, they offered to fully fund the purchase of the property for £7,750. In February 1912, the parties agreed a 999-year lease, on the conditions that:

1. The estate to be laid out by a competent gardener as a people's park
2. The house to be converted into a local museum or otherwise used for the benefit or enjoyment of the public
3. The whole to be kept in order in order for the purpose to which it is devoted
4. No intoxicating liquor to be sold on any part of the house or councils grounds
5. The rent to be £5 per annum and the work to be completed (so) that the park can be opened to the public on 21 September 1912

These were scoped to allow the property to be opened on the couple's first anniversary, and secondly because Sir Stafford had a belief that local authorities were inclined to be somewhat slow, and this was a way of enforcing progress. As the 1912 Miners' strike was in progress by March, cheap labour was extensively available to complete the project in time at a budget of £4,500. As agreed, the park was opened on 21 September 1912 by Lady Howard on her first wedding anniversary, and included a bandstand and tennis courts.

During the 1930s, the council acquired 5 acres (2.0 ha) of additional land to the north-east, extending today to where Parc Howard Avenue lies. A new entrance was made from Felin Foel Road, and the perimeter path suitably extended.

During both World War I and World War II, the property was used as a hospital for wounded soldiers. In 1915, the mansion was converted into a hospital for wounded soldiers, with 40 soldiers occupying five wards and being attended to by 18 Red Cross nurses. The hospital remained in operation after the end of hostilities until 1921, when it was let to the War Pensions Committee for a further three years to allow for disabled rehabilitation.

In 1965, Llanelli Borough Council bought the house and 32 acres (13 ha) of surrounding grounds from the Stepney estate for £350,000.

== Present ==
The site on Felinfoel Road (A476) is now managed by Carmarthenshire County Council. To the front is a small grassed terrace, while to north-east the informal lawn covers 5.2 acres (2.1 ha). There is a pond to the south of the lawn, and a sunken garden to its west. To the west of the house are the bowling greens and tennis courts, with an adjacent children's play area. On the western side of the site, a Gorsedd Circle marks the area where druids celebrate the Gorsedd ceremony to mark the National Eisteddfod, which was held in Llanelli in 1962. The park is registered at Grade II on the Cadw/ICOMOS Register of Parks and Gardens of Special Historic Interest in Wales.

== Collection and exhibits ==
Parc Howard Museum and Art Gallery is best known for its large and representative collection of the locally made Llanelly Pottery (1839–1920), gifted in 1933 by Lady Howard. It also houses paintings, portraits and other art works and displays artefacts relating to the local area, its history and culture.
