= Charles William Nevill =

Welsh industrialist and politician (1815–1888)

Charles William Nevill (7 May 1815 – 7 June 1888) was a Welsh owner of a copper smelting company in Llanelli, and a Conservative Party politician. He was elected at the 1874 general election as the Member of Parliament (MP) for Carmarthen Boroughs, but resigned from Parliament two years later, accepting the Stewardship of the Chiltern Hundreds in 1876.

== Family life ==
Charles William Nevill's grandfather was Charles Nevill (1753–1813) who founded a copper smelters in Llanelli which was passed to his son Richard Janion Nevill (1785–1856). Nevill was born in Llanelli in a house near the copperworks and was educated at Llanelli Boys' Grammar School and Rugby School. He took over the family business on his father's death.

== Public life ==
As a prominent industrialist it was natural that Nevill would become involved in local government and in 1850 became one of the first members of the Llanelly Board of Health. He was High Sheriff of Carmarthenshire in 1868.

== Member of Parliament ==
In 1874, the octogenarian member for the Carmarthen Boroughs, Sir John Stepney, announced his decision to retire. Almost immediately, his son, Arthur, emerged as the new Liberal candidate. Arthur Stepney was regarded as an unlikely radical, and there as general surprise at his declaration of support for policies such as the disestablishment of the Anglican church in Wales. Nevill, who has resisted calls to oppose the elder Stepney in 1868, now entered the fray. His candidature was strengthened by his status as 'one of the largest employers of labour' in the locality.

One of the features of the election was that nonconformist ministers in Llanelli sought to encourage opposition to Nevill.

Nevill's popularity in Llanelli led to his election, although he did not command a majority in the county town of Carmarthen, which had a smaller electorate.

During his short parliamentary career, Nevill did not always support Conservative policy. He voted in favour of the extension of the county franchise, and also supported Osborne Morgan's Burials' Bill.

On 19 July 1876, Nevill indicated his intention to resign as an MP, in a letter to the Vicar of Carmarthen, the Rev Latimer M. Jones. A number of possible candidates were initially mentioned, both Conservatives and Liberals. However, within a short time it became apparent that Arthur Stepney would succeed him. At the subsequent by-election, Stepney was returned unopposed.

== Later life and death ==
At Llanelli, Nevill played a prominent part in public life. He was a magistrate for over fifty years and served as chairman of both the Board of Guardians and Local Board of Health. Nevill died in 1888 at the age of 73.

== Arms ==
Coat of arms of Neville of Llangennech, Carmarthenshire
Crest A pied bull armed and gorged with a collar and line reflexed over the back or, and supporting with the dexter foot an escutcheon of the last, charged with an anchor erect sable. Escutcheon Gules on a saltire indented or, a crescent between four roses of the field barbed and seeded proper. Motto Ne vile velis (Nothing distasteful or vulgar)

== Sources ==
=== Online ===
- Oxford Dictionary of National Biography, Nevill family (per. c.1793–1973), copper smelters and colliery proprietors by R. Protheroe Jones and M. V. Symons.

Parliament of the United Kingdom
Preceded by Sir John Cowell-Stepney, Bt	Member of Parliament for Carmarthen Boroughs; 1874 – 1876	Succeeded by Arthur Cowell-Stepney
