= Russell Henry Manners =

Royal Navy Admiral (1800–1870)

Russell Henry Manners (31 January 1800 – 9 May 1870) was an admiral in the British Royal Navy and later President of the Royal Astronomical Society.

== Early life and career ==
He was born in London, the only child of the member of parliament Russell Manners. In 1813 he was sent to the Royal Naval College, and in 1816 he began a career in the British Royal Navy. He first served on Minden, and in 1818 he became a midshipman on Orlando. He served on Malabar, Spartan, and Pyramus before gaining his lieutenancy on Tyne. He continued to serve until 1827 when he gained command of Britomart.

== Scientific life ==
On 4 March 1829 he gained his post rank. From this time forward he devoted much of his attention to scientific interests. He was also wed in 1834 when he married Louisa Jane, the daughter of the Count de Noé of France, and sister of the artist Amédée de Noé. Although the couple had seven children, they were only survived by two sons and a daughter.

He was elected to the Royal Astronomical Society in 1836, and became engaged in administrative duties within the society. He served as honorary secretary from 1848 until 1858, when he became foreign secretary. He also served intermittently as society president, and was elected to that position in 1868.

He also continued his career in the Royal Navy. In 1849 he retired from active service, becoming rear admiral in 1855, vice admiral in 1862, and admiral in 1865.

The crater Manners on the Moon is named in his honour.
