= Russell Manners (MP) =

English Whig Member of Parliament

Russell Manners (c. 1771 – 16 January 1840) was an English Whig Member of Parliament (MP), notable for being successfully divorced by his wife Catherine. He was the son of Russell Manners and Mary Rayner.

Manners married Catherine Pollok, by whom he had one son: Russell Henry Manners (1800–1870).

At the 1806 general election he was returned without a contest as an MP for Grantham, but served only one year in the House of Commons and did not contest the 1807 general election.

After leaving Parliament, he went to Prince Edward Island, and afterwards to Edinburgh. There, in 1813, his wife was able to divorce him, under Scots law, for desertion and adultery, a course not available to her in England. She later married Sir Thomas Stepney, 9th Baronet.

Parliament of the United Kingdom
Preceded by Thomas Thoroton; Sir William Earle Welby, Bt	Member of Parliament for Grantham; 1806–1807; With: Thomas Thoroton	Succeeded by Thomas Thoroton; Sir William Earle Welby, Bt
