= Plas Taliaris =

Country house in Carmarthenshire, Wales

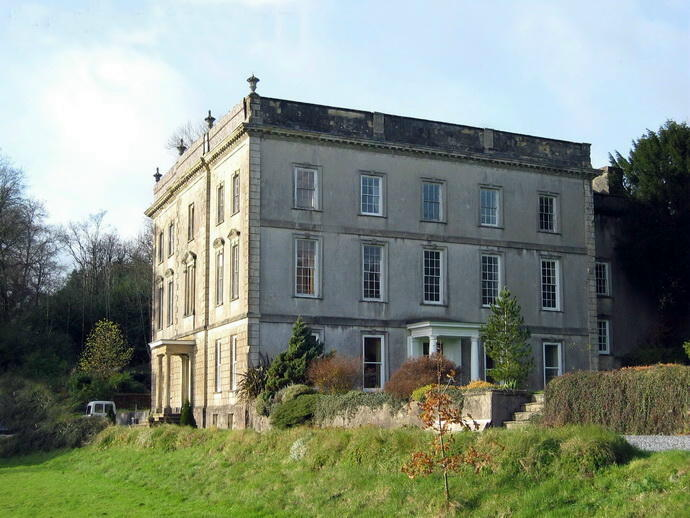

- Location within Wales

General information
- Architectural style: Georgian
- Location: Manordeilo, Llandeilo, Carmarthenshire, SA19 7NL, Wales
- Coordinates: 51.933701°N 3.979512°W
- Opened: early 16th century
- Renovated: 1989

Design and construction
- Designations: Grade I

Renovating team
- Architect: Peter Holden

Plas Taliaris is a Grade I-listed building two miles to the north-east of Salem in Carmarthenshire, west Wales. It was first mentioned in 1336 and was owned by the Gwynne family until the house was sold in 1787. Most of the estate was sold in the 1950s and the house was restored in around 1989. Its gardens and park are registered on the Cadw/ICOMOS Register of Parks and Gardens of Special Historic Interest in Wales.

== History ==
Plas Taliaris is first mentioned in patent rolls dating to 1336. The first family to establish themselves at the hall were the Gwynne family, who were descended from the son of the landholder Rhys ap Thomas. After the death of David Gwynne in around 1721 the estate was inherited by Richard Jones, a relative of the Gwynne family whose surname Jones later took. Under this owner the mansion was refaced in Bath stone. The estate was put up for sale in 1785, ten years after the death of Richard's son David Jones Gwynne.

The house was sold in 1787 to Lord Robert Seymour. Shortly after his death Seymour's widow sold the estate to the sum of £65,000 to the Lancashire businessman Robert Peel, first cousin to the twice-serving prime minister Sir Robert Peel. The Peel family remained its owners until 1954, when they sold most of the estate, and the mansion was brought by the Reverend Max Williams in 1967. The estate was restored by the architect Peter Holden in around 1989. Plas Taliaris is now protected as a Grade I-listed building; this status was conferred on the hall on 7 August 1966. The building has been used as a study centre offering training programmes and residential courses for visitors.

== The house ==
The house was built in the early sixteenth century; it is E-shaped and has gone through various modifications during its history. The south front is eighteenth century and is faced with Bath stone and has a flight of steps leading to a central porch with Doric columns. There are three storeys, and the south and east sides each have five regularly arranged windows. The house has a hipped roof hidden behind a parapet, running back to a half-hipped main roof. The chimney stacks are rendered.

The hall and several other rooms are panelled and the plasterwork and ceilings are ornate with decorated beams. There are classical scenes painted on some walls. The staircase is Jacobean in style and dates from about 1660; it has heavily carved newels, a thick moulded rail and turned balusters. It extends up four flights to the attic.

== The park ==
The park is registered at Grade II on the Cadw/ICOMOS Register of Parks and Gardens of Special Historic Interest in Wales. Its listing is due to its "essentially unaltered layout" form its establishment in the 18th century.
