= Sir John Stepney, 8th Baronet =

British politician (1743–1811)

Sir John Stepney, 8th Baronet (19 September 1743 – 3 October 1811), of Llanelli, Carmarthenshire, was a Welsh politician who sat in the House of Commons from 1767 to 1788.

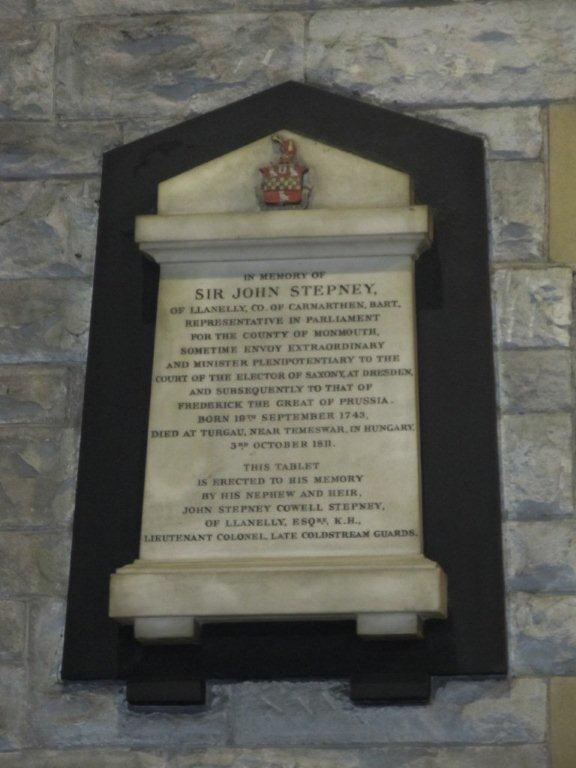
Memorial in St Elli church, Llanelli

He was born the first son of Sir Thomas Stepney, 7th Bt., of Llanelly and educated at Christ Church, Oxford, where he matriculated in 1760. He succeeded his father as 8th Baronet in 1772.

He was a Member (MP) of the Parliament of Great Britain for Monmouth Boroughs from 1767 to 1788.

He died unmarried in Trnava, Hungary in 1811. He was succeeded to the baronetcy by his brother Thomas, but left his estate to his illegitimate child, William Chambers.

Parliament of the United Kingdom
Preceded by Benjamin Bathurst	Member of Parliament for Monmouth Boroughs; 1767–1788	Succeeded by Marquess of Worcester
Baronetage of England
Preceded by Thomas Stepney	Baronet (of Prendergast); 1772–1811	Succeeded by Thomas Stepney
