= Sir Thomas Stepney, 5th Baronet =

Welsh politician (c1668–1745)

Sir Thomas Stepney, 5th Baronet (c. 1668 – 1745) was a Welsh landowner and politician who sat in the House of Commons from 1717 to 1722.

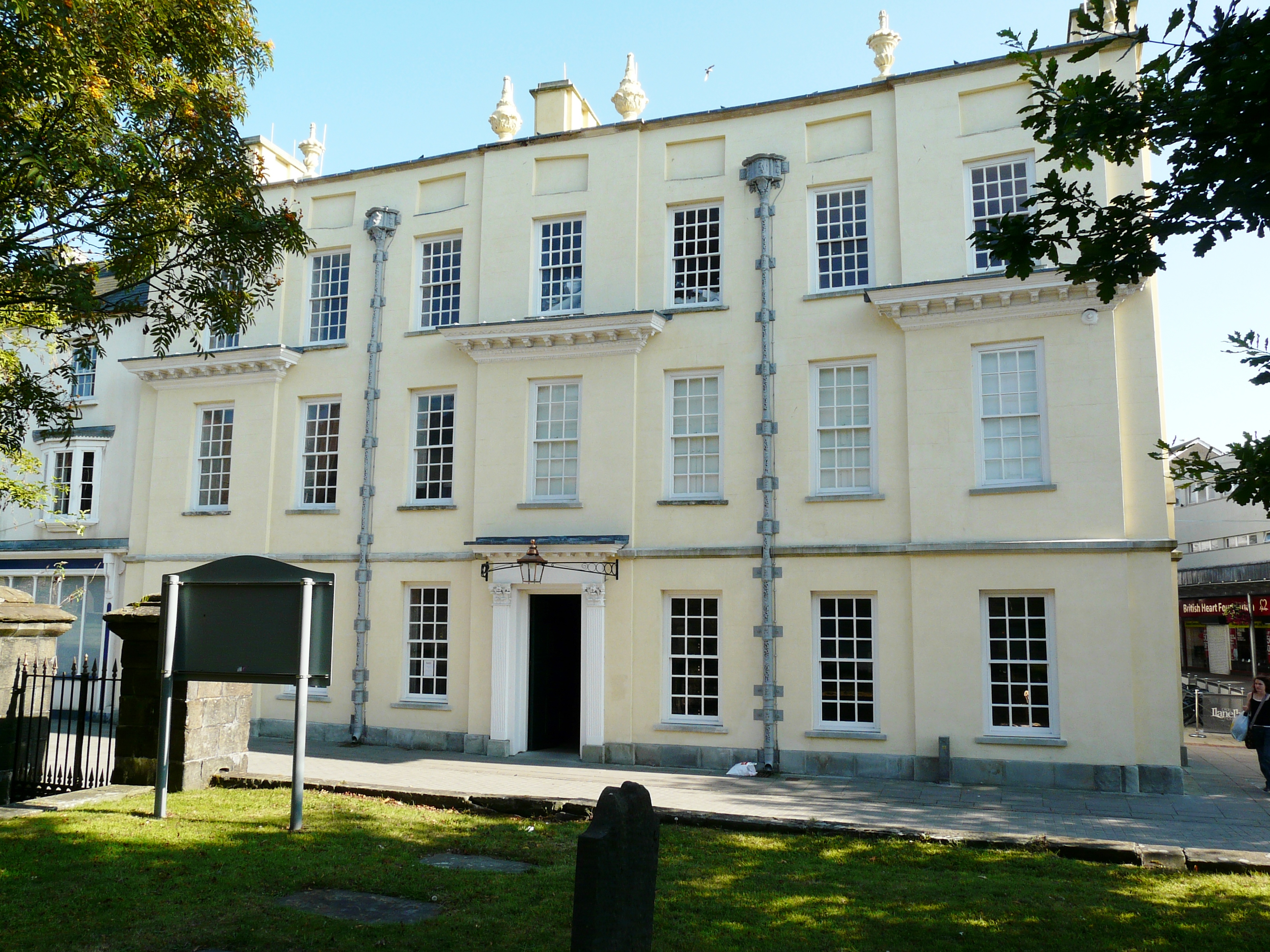
Llanelly House

Stepney was the only son of Sir John Stepney, 4th Baronet of Prendergast, Pembrokeshire, and his wife Justina Van Dyck, daughter of Sir Anthony van Dyck the artist. He succeeded to baronetcy on the death of his father in 1681. In 1691, he married Margaret Vaughan, daughter of John Vaughan of Llanelli. She was co-heiress of a branch of the Vaughan family of Golden Grove, who had been MPs for Carmarthenshire during the seventeenth century. He was High Sheriff of Pembrokeshire in the year 1696 to 1697, and was Colonel of the Pembrokeshire Militia in 1697. In 1714 he decided to build Llanelly House a town house in Llanelli .

Stepney was returned unopposed as Member of Parliament for Carmarthenshire at a by-election on 23 May 1717. He did not stand again at the 1722 general election or subsequently.

Stepney died at the beginning of 1745 and was buried at Llanelli on 19 January 1745, aged 76. He left a son, John, who succeeded him in the baronetcy and two daughters.

Llanelly House passed out of the family in time, but in 2011 work was begun to restore the building which is now open to the public.

Parliament of Great Britain
Preceded by Charles Powlett	Member of Parliament for Carmarthenshire; 1717– 1722	Succeeded by Edward Rice
Baronetage of England
Preceded by John Stepney	Baronet (of Prendergast); 1681-1745	Succeeded by John Stepney
