= Stepney family =

English landowning family in Wales

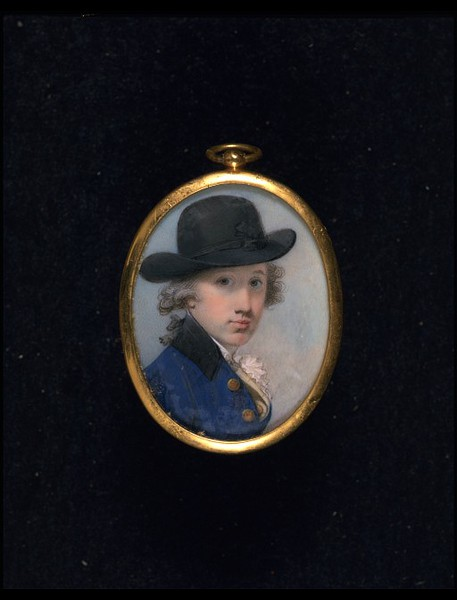
Portrait miniature of Sir Thomas Stepney, 9th Baronet (1760–1825). Watercolour on ivory, painted by George Engleheart, 1785

The Stepney family are an English family, who having originated in Stepney, London, made their fortune in lands surrounding Llanelli, West Wales.

== Alban Stepney ==
The Stepneys originated from the London suburb of that name, but by the mid-15th century a branch of the family was settled at St Albans in Hertfordshire, subsequently owning the manor of Aldenham from 1546 to 1589. The Welsh branch was established by Alban Stepney, a young lawyer who came to Pembrokeshire in 1559 with his relation by marriage Richard Davies, Bishop of St Davids. On 31 December 1561 the bishop appointed him receiver-general of the Diocese of St Davids, and he also served as its registrar. He established a substantial estate centred on Prendergast, near Haverfordwest, as a result of successive marriages to two wealthy heiresses. He served as a JP and sheriff for both Pembrokeshire and Carmarthenshire, as well as being elected MP for Haverfordwest in 1572, 1584 and 1586, for Cardigan in 1588, and for Pembrokeshire in 1602. He died on 19 August 1611.

== The first baronets ==
Alban's eldest son John Stepney (b. 1581), was created a baronet in 1621. He was educated at Oxford and Lincoln's Inn, later becoming a JP, sheriff of Pembrokeshire in 1614, and mayor of Haverfordwest in 1620. His brother Thomas became a courtier, was knighted and in 1622 saved the life of King James VI and I when he fell from his horse; one of Sir Thomas's grandsons was the poet and diplomat George Stepney.

Sir John died on 21 July 1626 and was succeeded by his son Sir Alban Stepney (c. 1607–1628), whose brother, Sir John Stepney (b. c.1618), became the third baronet. (Some early histories of the family show only eight baronets rather than nine because they were unaware of Alban's brief tenure.) In April 1640 Sir John was elected MP for Pembroke in the Short Parliament, then for Haverfordwest in the Long Parliament from November 1640, and held the seat until disqualified in 1643. He remained a staunch royalist and was governor of Haverfordwest during the Civil War, although he abandoned the town without a fight in February 1644. He was captured by Parliamentary forces at Hereford on 18 December 1645 and imprisoned in Southwark, being released on payment of substantial fines. In 1662 he served as mayor of Haverfordwest, becoming deputy lieutenant of Pembrokeshire in 1674. He died before 26 September 1676.

== The Stepneys at Llanelli ==
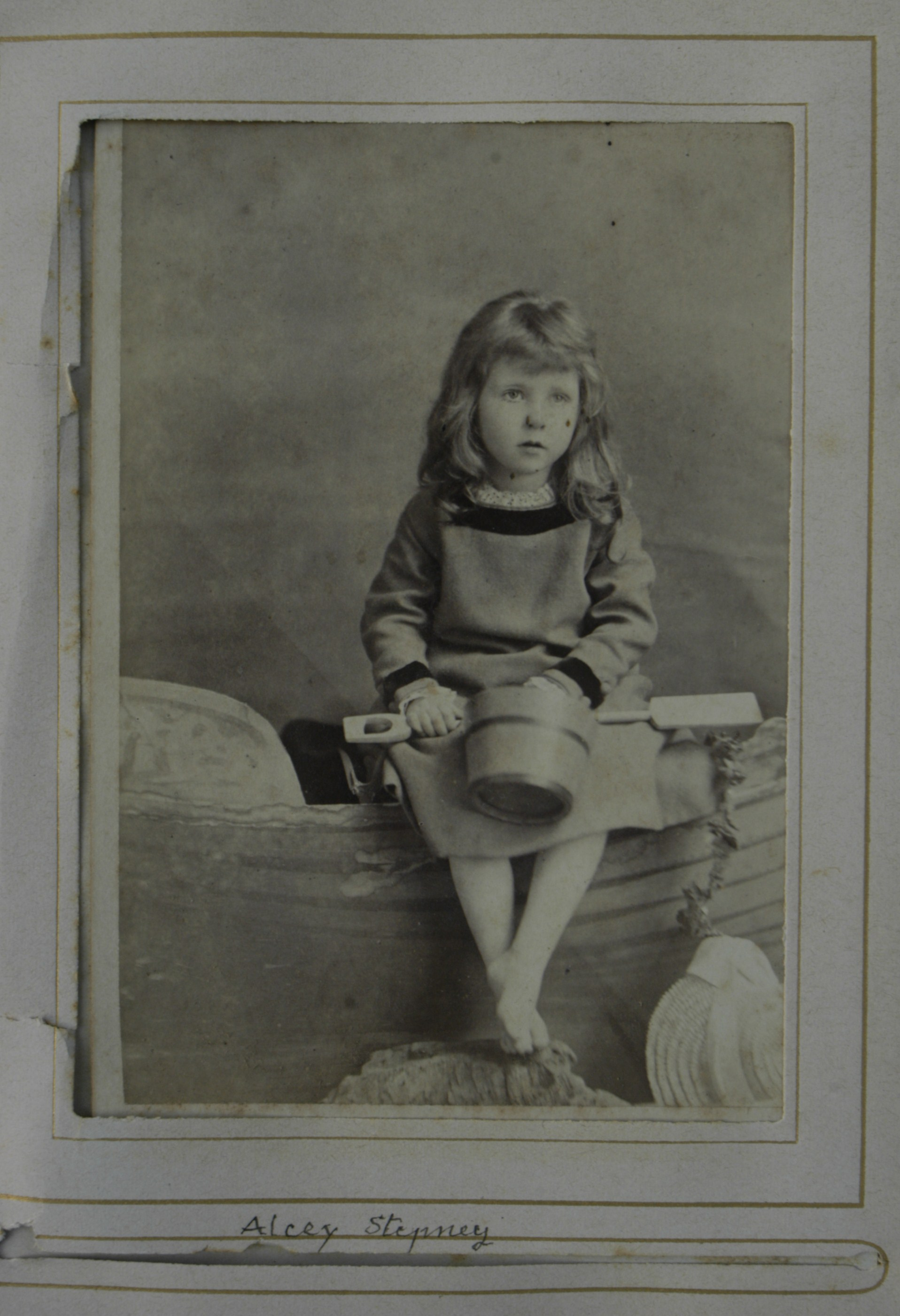
Llanelli heiress. Catherine Meriel Cowell-Stepney (Miss Alcyone Stepney) (1876–1952), in Eastbourne. She married Sir Stafford Howard in 1911 and died known as Lady Howard-Stepney.

The third baronet's nephew, Sir John Stepney (d. 1681), the fourth baronet, married Justina Mariana, only child and heiress of Sir Anthony van Dyck, the artist; through her grandfather Patrick Ruthven, last surviving brother of John, Earl of Gowrie, she inherited and passed on to subsequent generations of Stepneys a claim to the attainted Scottish titles and estates of the Ruthven family.

Their son Sir Thomas Stepney, 5th Baronet, married Margaret, sister and co-heiress (with Anne Lloyd of Cwmgwili) of Walter Vaughan of Llanelli, on 9 December 1691. He was sheriff of Pembrokeshire in 1697 and MP for Carmarthenshire from 1717 to 1722, although his three sisters were all nuns in Flemish convents and Sir Thomas himself seems to have had Jacobite tendencies. Sir Thomas moved the family's main seat from Prendergast, which was eventually sold in 1772, to Llanelly House. Sir Thomas was buried on 19 January 1745. His memorial in Llanelli parish church claims that he was descended from King Henry VII – an error resulting from misconceptions about the ancestry of the Earls of Gowrie. The sixth baronet, Sir John Stepney (1693–1748) held the estate for only three years before being succeeded by his son Sir Thomas Stepney (1725–1772), who developed considerable business and shipping interests centred on Llanelli. He married Elizabeth Lloyd (d. 1795), heiress of Trehir and the Derwydd estate, but the marriage broke down irreparably in the 1760s, at least partly because of the couple's financial problems.

The Stepney family then failed with the death without issue of Sir Thomas Stepney (d. 1825), ninth baronet. However, one of his aunts, Elizabeth Brigetta Stepney (1749–1780), married the collector and MP Joseph Gulston; their descendants, the Stepney-Gulstons, ultimately inherited Derwydd. Meanwhile, the Cowell-Stepney, baronets, of Llanelli, are descended from another aunt, Maria Justina Stepney (1757–1821), a daughter of the seventh baronet Sir Thomas by his second marriage. Maria Justina married General Andrew Cowell in 1788. Their son John (1791–1877) assumed the name Stepney-Cowell in 1857, and was created a baronet in 1871. His granddaughter, Catherine Meriel Cowell Stepney (1876–1952), married Sir Edward Stafford Howard (1851–1916), and assumed the name Howard-Stepney.

== The last baronets ==
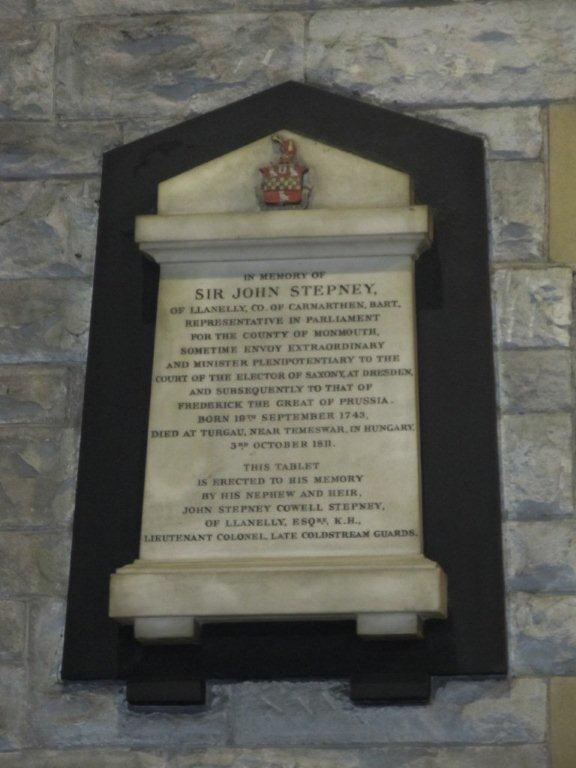
Sir John Stepney, 8th baronet, 1743–1811 – Memorial from St Elli Parish Church

The eighth baronet, Sir John Stepney (1743–1811), was MP for Monmouth Boroughs from 1767–88, ambassador to Saxony from 1775–82 and to Prussia from 1782–4; his career owed much to Henry Somerset, 5th Duke of Beaufort, a close friend from their time together at Oxford. Sir John was the last British subject to have his passport personally signed by the monarch. Financial problems, perhaps the result of his passions for horse-racing and cards, led him on a number of occasions to attempt to sell Llanelly House and other parts of his estates. A notorious rake and member of the circle around Charles James Fox, Stepney never married but had a number of affairs, notably with the society beauty Lady Almeria Carpenter. He had at least three illegitimate sons, one of whom, William Chambers, eventually inherited his estates under the terms of Sir John's remarkably complicated will. He moved abroad in 1802 and died at Trnava, now in Slovakia, on 3 October 1811.

With the death of Sir John's brother, Sir Thomas Stepney (1760–1825), a well-known figure in London's clubland and groom of the bed-chamber to the duke of York, the baronetcy became extinct. The last baronet's second wife was the Victorian novelist Catherine, Lady Stepney, who hosted fashionable soirees and patronised the likes of Disraeli and Bulwer-Lytton.

== Aftermath ==
Llanelly House and the Stepney family's other estates passed successively to the Chambers, Stepney-Gulston and Cowell-Stepney families. The name 'Stepney' is still used in India, Pakistan and elsewhere to describe a car's spare tyre; it was invented in 1904 in a garage in Stepney Street, Llanelli (one of many streets in the town named after the family).
