= Catherine Stepney =

British novelist

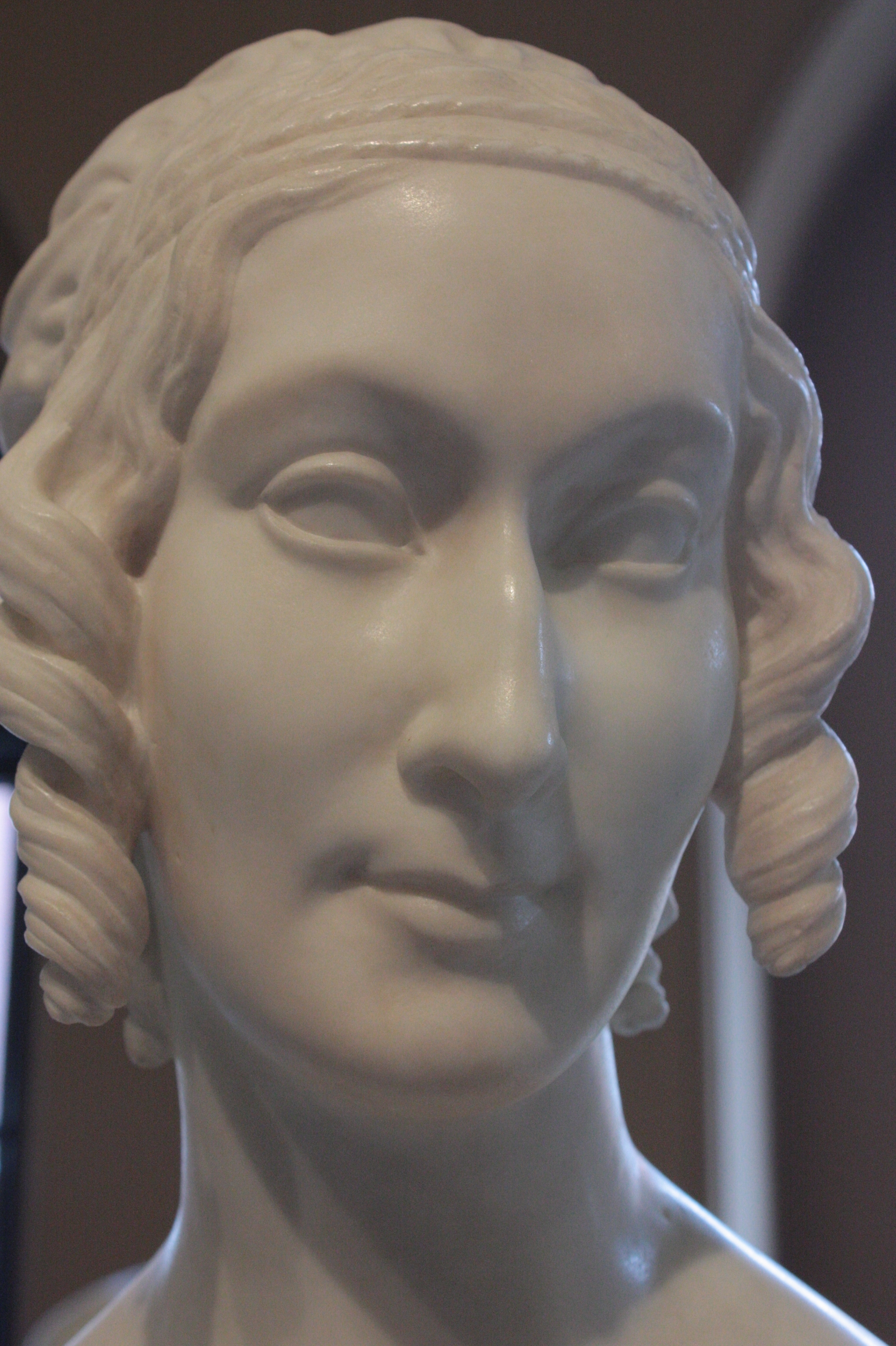
- Lady Catherine Stepney by Richard Cockle Lucas
- Born: 23 December 1778; Grittleton
- Died: 14 April 1845 (aged 66); London
- Other names: Catherine Manners

Catherine Stepney (23 December 1778 – 14 April 1845) was a British novelist.

== Life ==
Catherine Pollok was born in Grittleton, Wiltshire in 1778. Her first husband was Russell Manners, whom she divorced. In 1813 she married Sir Thomas Stepney who was the ninth and as it turned out the last Stepney baronet, of Prendergast. He was a groom of the bed-chamber to the Duke of York and he died without issue in 1825.

Stepney is credited with writing six novels, but Mary Mitford claimed that Stepney's drafts were honed and polished by Letitia Elizabeth Landon. She wrote two novels during her first marriage, and four known as the silver fork novels after her second marriage were about the high society she frequented.

Stepney was known as a hostess because her house was a meeting place for London's artistic and literary society. In 1836 she modelled for a bust by Richard Cockle Lucas who portrayed her as Cleopatra. This bust is now in the Victoria and Albert Museum. The National Portrait Gallery has a painting of her made by John Hayter.

Stepney died in London on 14 April 1845. She was buried in the catacombs of Kensal Green Cemetery, London. After her death there were accounts of how she was unaware that her novels were not always well regarded.

== Bibliography ==
=== Catherine Manners ===
- Castle Nuovier; or, Henrii and Adelina, Catherine Manners, 1806 (alternatively titled Castle Nuovier, or, Henry and Adelina)
- The Lords of Erith, Catherine Manners, 1809

=== Catherine Stepney ===
- The New Road to Ruin, Catherine Stepney, 1833
- The Heir Presumptive, Catherine Stepney, 1835
- The Courtier's Daughter, Catherine Stepney, 1838, 1841
- The Three Peers, Catherine Stepney, 1841
