= Llanelly House =

Georgian house in Llanelli, West Wales

Coordinates: 51.6834°N 4.1614°W

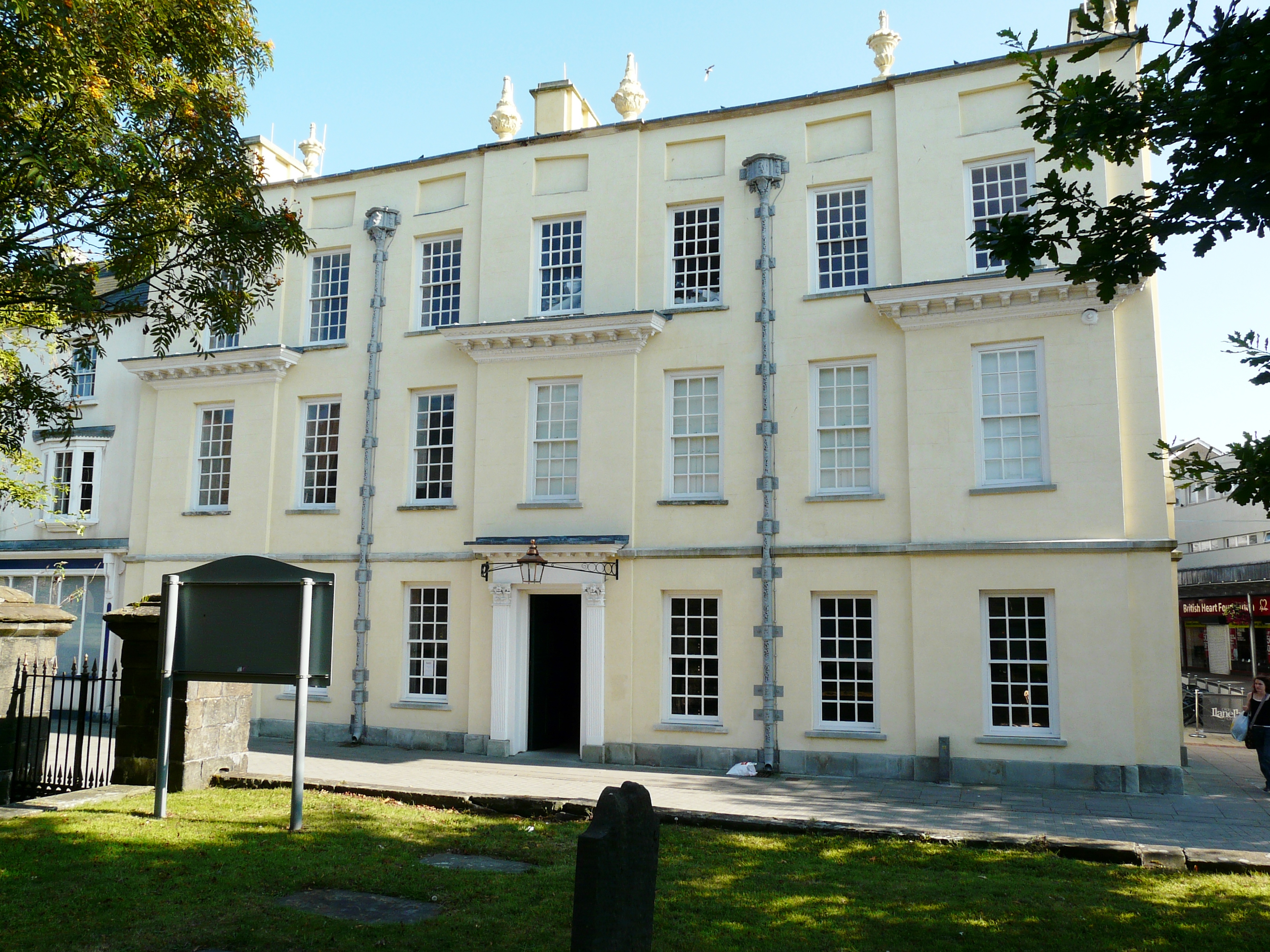
- Interactive map of the Llanelly House area

General information
- Location: Llanelli, Carmarthenshire, Wales
- Construction started: 1714
- Owner: Carmarthenshire Heritage Regeneration Trust

Llanelly House (also spelled Llanelli House) is an early-18th-century Georgian town house in Llanelli, Carmarthenshire, Wales. It has been described as "the most outstanding domestic building of its early Georgian type to survive in South Wales." The building is a heritage property, Grade I, "for the unique quality and historic importance of this townhouse in Wales."

The then Member of Parliament for Carmarthenshire, Sir Thomas Stepney, 5th Baronet, of the Pembrokeshire and Carmarthenshire Stepney family, built the house in 1714. John Wesley, the early leader of the Methodist movement, stayed at the house several times during his visits to the town.

The house, located directly opposite the parish church of St Ellyw, was in a poor state of repair; however, the town council purchased it from the local business community with the intention of completely restoring the House for civic and public use.

== History ==
Sir Thomas Stepney acquired the property through marriage, it was previously owned by the Vaughans of Golden Grove. The townhouse was built in 1714.

In the 1740s, the Stepney family hosted members of the Methodist movement and held Methodist services in the house.

Around 1825, the property was bought by William Chambers, founder of South Wales Pottery.

== Restoration ==
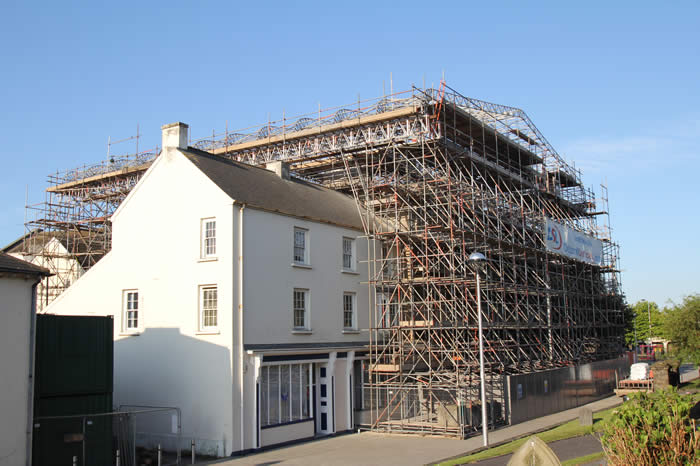
The house during its restoration, January 2012

In November 2009, Carmarthenshire Heritage Regeneration Trust (CHRT) secured £6 million for the conservation and restoration of the building, with plans to develop a ground-breaking innovative visitor experience with heritage at its core. Extensive research into the history of the house and its original condition was performed focusing on the architecture and design of the building, as well as artefacts and stories of past occupants who left their mark in Llanelli's history. The benefactors of the project are the Heritage Lottery Fund, Welsh European Funding Office (WEFO) and Cadw. The aim is to create a social hub that the entire community can utilise, evoking local and national pride.

== Media ==
The Llanelly House project was effectively started during the 2003 BBC Restoration series, in which the building was an acclaimed finalist, championed by Laurence Llewelyn-Bowen. During the series, the house reached the final as the winner of the Welsh heat. In June 2006, Llanelly House featured in the TV show Most Haunted Live as part of a three-night investigation which also included Parc Howard Museum and Kidwelly Castle. In February 2011, Carmarthenshire County Council announced that the necessary funding for the restoration was in place and that the architects Austin-Smith:Lord had been engaged to undertake the £6m restoration project.

== Archaeology ==
The construction work that has taken place in the house has allowed archaeologists to expose hidden areas that have been covered up for hundreds of years. One significant find recovered from the demolition rubble in Sir Thomas Stepney's study was a clay tobacco pipe bowl from 1650-80. On its base was the maker’s mark, a 'gloved hand’, identifying the pipe as a product of the Gauntlet family, famous Wiltshire pipe-makers based in Amesbury.

Also in the study, a book was found above a safe. This is believed to be the first Letter Book for the Margrave Brothers, a wine and spirit merchant established in 1871, who traded for over 100 years in the house.

A flight of stone stairs has been uncovered during the construction work leading down to the cobbled floor. These are thought to have originally led, in the late 17th century, to an enclosed 'cupboard' or scullery area which would have in turn given access to the low storage or basement areas which have already been exposed.

Excavations have revealed that the north-western part of the ground floor, possibly the former Great Hall, is the oldest part of the house, with parts of the underlying foundations and the far eastern slanted wall being 15th–16th century in date and its earliest foundations may well have associations with the dissolution of the lesser monastery of St. Elli. This medieval building would probably have started life out as a two-storey, two-unit, end chimney gabled house, possibly with a byre building or extension attached to the west.

In the early 17th century, possibly due to damage from the Great Flood of 1606–07 and the marriage of Anne Lewis to Walter Vaughan of Golden Grove, an eastern extension was added to the original house. This addition, which included what was once Sir Thomas Stepney’s study and now the West Credit Union building, formed a long, L-shaped, three-storey structure with a gabled roof that may have included dormer windows.

In the late 17th century, at some time between 1660 and 1680 the floor level appears to have been raised across the whole house, thus forming one complete level ground floor with the creation of a common or service hall with a low basement area and potentially the creation of the stair hall. In response to this work, the ceiling heights also appear to have been raised some 0.40–0.50 metres (1 ft 4 in – 1 ft 8 in) on the ground floor. The interior walls of the house at this time would have all been plastered with no wooden wall panelling. The earliest oak wall panelling was most probably added in the early to mid-18th century, with pine panelling added later.

In the early years of the 18th century, post 1705, Margaret Vaughan inherited Llanelly House from one of her elder sisters on her death in 1706/7. In 1691 Margaret had already married Sir Thomas Stepney (5th Baronet), thus the Stepney lineage at the house had begun. Thomas Stepney was most likely responsible for the commissioning of the new house's front façade with its present third floor with hipped roof in a Queen Anne style, work that probably was not fully completed until 1714, as is evident from a date on one of the surviving lead drainage hoppers.

== Reopening ==
Llanelly House officially reopened on 1 November 2013.

The building struggled with high running costs. In 2017 Carmarthenshire County Council paid £350,000 to the management trust to cover their debts. By 2019 the council were paying £60,000 per year to help keep the building open.

== See also ==
- Listed buildings in Llanelli
