= Richard Jennings =

Richard Jennings may refer to:

- Richard Jennings (politician) (c. 1619–1668), English parliamentarian
- Richard Jennings (economist) (1814-1891), British economist
- Richard Jennings (Royal Navy officer) (1903–2001), English Royal Navy officer
- Richard E. Jennings (1921–1997), English comic book artist
- Richard Slater Jennings (1922–2005), American artist and journalist
- Rick Jennings (born 1953), American football player
