= High Sheriff of Carmarthenshire =

Welsh county ceremonial officer

This is a list of High Sheriffs of Carmarthenshire. Carmarthenshire was originally created by the Statute of Rhuddlan in 1284. It became an administrative county in 1889 with a county council following the Local Government Act 1888. Under the Local Government Act 1972, the administrative county of Carmarthenshire was abolished on 1 April 1974 and the area of Carmarthenshire became three districts within the new county of Dyfed : Carmarthen, Dinefwr and Llanelli. Under the Local Government (Wales) Act 1994, Dyfed was abolished on 1 April 1996 and the three districts united to form a unitary authority which had the same boundaries as the original Carmarthenshire but remaining in the shrievalty of Dyfed.

== List of Sheriffs ==
- 1424-1426: Sir John Skydemore of Kentchurch, Herefs.
- 1432-1435: Griffith Dwnn, of Mudlescwm, Kidwelly (father of Sir John, below)
- 1436: Sir Gruffudd ap Nicolas
- 1438: Sir Edward Stradling
- 1463: Sir John Dwn of Kidwelly

=== 16th century ===
- 1516: Sir Thomas Phillips
- 1541: Jenkin Lloyd of Pwlldyfach
- 1542: Sir William Thomas of Aberglasney
- 1543: Sir Thomas Jones of Abermarlais (grandfather of Donne Lee)
- 1544: William Morgan Donn of Muddlescomb
- 1545: James Williams of Pant Hoel
- 1546: John Philipps of Clogyfran
- 1547: Griffyth Done (or Dwnn) of Ystrad Merthyr near Kidwelly
- 1548: Thomas Brine of Cenarth
- 1549: Rhys ap William ap Thomas Goch of Ystradffin
- 1550: David Gwyn ap Howel ap Rhydderch of Ystrad Wallter
- 1551: Griffith Higgon of New Carmarthen
- 1552: Sir John Vaughan of Whitland Abbey
- 1553: David Vaughan
- 1554: William Philipps of Picton Castle and Clogyfran
- 1555: David Griffith Leyson of the Priory, Carmarthen
- 1556: Griffith Dwnn of Pibwr
- 1557: Walter Vaughan of Pembrey of Pembrey Court
- 1558: Griffith Higgon of Carmarthen
- 1559: David Vaughan of Kidwelly
- 1560: Griffith Dwnn of Pibwr
- 1561: David Gwynne ap Howel (Powell) ap Rhydderch of Ystrad Wallter
- 1562: Rees ap William ap Thomas Goch of Ystradffin
- 1563: John Vaughan of Golden Grove
- 1564: Sir John Vaughan of Whitland Abbey
- 1565: Rhys Thomas of Aberglasney
- 1566: Thomas Vaughan (1st term) of Pembrey Court
- 1567: Griffith Rice of Newton
- 1568: David Parry of Ystrad Wallter
- 1569: James Williams of Pant Hoel
- 1570: Thomas Vaughan (2nd term) of Pembrey Court
- 1571: George Powell of Ystrad Wallter
- 1572: Richard Vaughan of Whitland Abbey
- 1573: Rhydderch Gwynne of Glanbran
- 1574: Sir Henry Jones of Abermarlais
- 1575: Griffith Vaughan of Trimsaran
- 1576: William Thomas of Aberglasney
- 1577: Thomas ap Rhys William Goch of Ystradffin
- 1578: Griffith Lloyd of Forest
- 1579: Thomas Lloyd of Lianstephan
- 1580: William Davies of Ystrad
- 1581: Sir George Devereux of Ystrad Ffin
- 1582: William Thomas of Aberglasney
- 1583: Griffith Rice of Newton, Llandefaison
- 1584: Sir Henry Jones of Abermarlais
- 1585: Walter Vaughan of Golden Grove
- 1586: Walter Rice of Newton, Llandefaison
- 1587: Griffith Vaughan of Trimsaran (died); Thomas ap Rhys William Goch of Ystradffin
- 1588: Edward Donne Lee of Abercynfor
- 1589: Sir Thomas Jones of Abermarlais Park and Emlyn Castle
- 1590: David Griffith Lloyd of Llanllawddog
- 1591: Lewis Williams of Panthowel
- 1592: Thomas ap Rhys William Goch of Ystradffin
- 1593: William Gwyn of Cynghordy
- 1594: Edward Donne Lee of Abercynfor
- 1595: Francis Mansel of Muddlescomb
- 1596: Francis Lloyd of Llanbedr
- 1597: Alban Stepney of Prendergast, Pembrokeshire
- 1598: Rowland Gwyn of Glanbran
- 1599: James Prydderch of Nant-yr-Hebog
- 1600: Francis Lloyd of Glyn, Llangendeirn

=== 17th century ===
- 1601: David Griffith Llwyd or Lloyd of Llanllawddog
- 1602: Morgan Jones Parry of Tregib (died); Charles Vaughan of Cwmgwili
- 1603: Sir Thomas Jones of Abermarlais Park and Emlyn Castle
- 1604: George Herbert of Castell Pigyn
- 1605: Sir John Vaughan of Golden Grove
- 1606: Sir Henry Jones of Abermarlais
- 1607: William Davies of Bettws
- 1608: Rhys Prydderch of Laugharne
- 1609: John Lloyd of Glangwili (son of David, HS 1590,1601)
- 1610: Richard Prothergh
- 1611: Francis Mansel of Muddlescombe
- 1612: David Jones of Ynys Wen, Abercothi
- 1613: Thomas William Lloyd of Alltycadno
- 1614: Rhys Williams of Rhydodin
- 1615: Morris Bowen of Llechdwnny
- 1616: William Vaughan of Torycoed
- 1617: Thomas Johnes of Glansawdde
- 1618: Morgan Thomas of Bailey Ficer
- 1619: Sir Rice Rudd of Aberglasney
- 1620: Henry Vaughan of Derwydd
- 1621: Gruffydd Lloyd of Ynys Wen, Abercothi
- 1622: John Gwynne of Gwempa
- 1623: Sir John Philipps, 1st Baronet of Clogyfran
- 1624: John Stedman of Liettygariad
- 1625: David Morgan Rhys of Llangadock
- 1626: Walter Vaughan of Llanelly
- 1627: Griffith Lloyd of Forest
- 1628: John Williams of Panthowel
- 1629: Francis Lloyd of Danyrallt
- 1630: Griffith Penry of Llangennech
- 1631: Richard Vaughan of Cwrt Derllys
- 1632: David Gwynne of Glanbran
- 1633: George Jones Snr of Abercothi (died); John Bloome of Upper Penybanc
- 1634: Lewis Bevan of Penycoed, St. Clears
- 1635: Thomas Vaughan of Cwmgwili
- 1636: David Vaughan of Trimsaran
- 1637: Sir Rice Rudd of Aberglasney
- 1638: Rowland Gwynne of Taliaris
- 1639: Sir Henry Jones of Abermarlais
- 1640: John Harry David of Coed-y-Garth
- 1641: Sir Richard Philipps, 2nd Baronet, of Picton Castle
- 1642: Philip Lloyd of Wenallt
- 1643: John Vaughan of Plasgwyn
- 1644: George Jones Jnr of Abercothi
- 1644: Henry Middleton of Middleton Hall
- 1645: John Phiipps of Wythfawr
- 1646: Charles Gwynne of Gwempa
- 1647: Francis Jones of Tregib
- 1648: Francis Lloyd of Dangrart
- 1649: Henry Price of Abergorlech
- 1650: Sir Erasmus Philipps, 3rd Baronet, of Picton Castle
- 1651: George Gwynne of Llwyn Howel
- 1652: Walter Jones of Llwynffortun
- 1653: Thomas William Lloyd of Alltycadno
- 1654: Lewis Lloyd of Llangennech
- 1655: Humphrey Browne of Green Castle
- 1656: Thomas Lloyd of Glangwili
- 1657: Owen Brigstocke of Kidwelly (1st term)
- 1658: Thomas Lloyd of Danyrallt
- 1659: John Vaughan of Plas Gwyn
- 1660: Roland Gwynne of Glanbran (outlawed); John Vaughan of Ty Gwyn, Ffairfach
- 1661:Sir Henry Vaughan of Derwydd, Llandebie
- 1661: Philip Vaughan of Trimsaran
- 1662: Edward Mansel, 4th Baronet
- 1663: Edward Rice
- 1664: George Jones of Abercothi
- 1665: Nicholas Williams of Rhydodin
- 12 November 1665: William Lloyd
- 7 November 1666: James Johnes, of Dolau Cothy
- 6 November 1667: Christopher Middleton, of Middleton Hall
- 6 November 1668: Owen Brigstocke, of Kidwelly (2nd term)
- 11 November 1669: John Lloyd, of Meidrim and Wenallt
- 4 November 1670: Richard Gwynne, of Gwempa
- 9 November 1671: Rees William Howell, of Corngafar, Mydrim and Bwlchgwynt
- 11 November 1672: William Bevan, of Penycoed, St. Clears
- 1673: Thomas Johnes of Dolau Cothi
- 12 November 1673: John Lloyd, of Llangennech
- 18 November 1674: Morgan Jones, of Tregib
- 10 January 1674/5: John Bowen, of Swansea
- 15 November 1675: Morgan Jones
- 10 November 1676: John Scurlocke, of Carmarthen
- 15 November 1677: John Philips
- 1679: Rawleigh Mansel, of Kilvrough, Killay, Glamorganshire
- 13 November 1679: Sir Rice Williams, of Rhydodin
- 4 November 1680: John Williams, of Abercothi, Llanegwad
- 1682: William Ball of Pembrey Court
- 1683: Walter Vaughan of Llanelly
- 1684: Thomas Lloyd of Alltycadno
- 1685: Edward Vaughan of Penybanc
- 1686: Richard Mansell of Iscoed
- 1687: John Phillips of Dolhaidd
- 1688: John Evans of Trefenty
- 1689: Edward Mansel, 1st Baronet
- 1690: Edward Jones of Llethrneuadd
- 1691: Walter Thomas of Bremenda
- 1692: Francis Browne of Frood
- 1693: Rowland Gwynne of Taliaris
- 1694: Griffith Rice of Newton, Llandesfaison
- 1695: Nathan Griffiths of Mountain Hall, Llangeler
- 1696: William Dawkin of Kilvrough, Gower, Glamorganshire
- 1697: John Lloyd of Llangennech
- 1698: Nicholas Williams of Ystradwrallt, Edwinsford
- 1699: Griffith Williams of Carmarthen (died); George Lewis of Carmarthen
- 1700: Walter Morgan

=== 18th century ===
- 1701: Richard Middleton of Middleton Hall
- 1701: Rice Lloyd
- 1702: Thomas Lloyd of Danyrallt
- 1703: Zachary Bevan of Laugharne
- 1704: John Morgan of Carmarthen
- 1705: Morgan Jones of Tregib
- 1706: David Lewes of Llysnewydd
- 1707: Thomas Lloyd of Alltycadno
- 1708: Daniel Hughes of Penymaes
- 1709: Richard Phillips of Llettygariad
- 1710: Matthew Hardbottle of Hendrehedog
- 1711: David Gwynne of Taliaris
- 1712: Stephen Walter of Cellivor
- 1713: John Powell of Lower Penybanc
- 1714: Rees Edwards of Llanddeusant
- 1715: Grismond Philipps of Cwmgwili
- 1716: Sir Charles Lloyd, 1st Baronet of Maesyfelin
- 1717: Francis Lloyd of Glyn
- 1718: Owen Edwardes of Llanmilo
- 1719: Rowland Lewis of Torycoed
- 1720: Thomas Lloyd of Berilandywyll
- 1721: David Lloyd of Glyn-y-March
- 1722: John Griffiths of Castell Pigyn
- 1723: Francis Price of Erw-wastad, Llanedy
- 1724: John Allen of Garreg Lwyd, Llanelly
- 1725: Thomas Evans of Achaeth
- 1726: John Lloyd of Danyrallt
- 1727: Philip Jones of Lletherneuadd
- 1728: Thomas Lloyd of Derwydd
- 1729: Sir Edward Vaughan of Trimsaran
- 1730: Rawleigh Mansel (born Dawkin) of Cwrt, Pembrey
- 1731: Thomas Gwynne of Gwempa
- 1732: Morgan Lloyd of Glansefin
- 1733: Richard Lewis of Troedyrhiw
- 1734: Morgan Davies of Cwm, Llangynog
- 1735: Thomas Bevan of Penycoed
- 1736: William Penry of Llanedy
- 1737: Samuel Hughes of Llwyn-y-brain
- 1738: James Lewis of Cilgynydd, Llanboidy
- 1739: Williams Philipps of Cilsant
- 1740: John Protheroe of Llanfallteg
- 1741: William Rees of Capel Dewi
- 1742: James Johnson of Carmarthen
- 1743: John Philipps of Coedgain
- 1744: Lewis Price of Glanyranell
- 1745: Hector Rees of Pembrey Court
- 1746: Eugene Vaughan of Plasgwyn
- 1747: David Pugh of Coedmor
- 1748: Hector Jones of Coedstre, Liangeler
- 1749: John Lewis of Liwynifortun
- 1750: Richard Davies of Crynfryn, Newchurch
- 1751: Richard Coney Jones of Castell Pigyn
- 1752: Walter Powell of Glantowy, Llangadoc
- 1753: William Thomas of Castell Gorfod
- 1754: Admiral David Edwardes of Rhydygors
- 1755: Rees Price of Carmarthen
- 1756: Henry Penry of Gellyceidrim
- 1757: Griffith Jones of Pantyrhaidd, Conwil Elfet
- 1758: Rees Prythercb, of Kellycoombe
- 1759: Arthur Jones of Fountain Hall, Carmarthen
- 1760: John Rees of Pantyrewig
- 1761: Richard Gwyn of Middleton Hall
- 1762: John Corrie of Carmarthen
- 1763: David Bowen of Pibwrlwyd
- 1764: Woodford Rice of Gellyfergam
- 1765: William Rees of Laugharne
- 1766: Evan Griffiths of Glanrhyd
- 1767: Rees Prytherch of Cnwc Teilog
- 1768: Edward Parry of Carmarthen
- 1769: Leonard Bilson Gwynne of Gwempa
- 1770: George Philipps of Coedgain
- 1771: Vaughan Horton of Lletherllesty
- 1772: William Jones of Dyfiryn, Llandebie
- 1773: Gwynne Vaughan of Dolgwm
- 1774: John Adams of Whitland Abbey
- 1775: Walter Rice Howell Powell of Maesgwynne
- 1776: William Herbert Dyer of Aberglasney
- 1777: David Lloyd of Alltyrodin, Cardiganshire
- 1778: Richard le Davids of Pibwrwen
- 1779: Evan Protheroe of Doiwilym
- 1780: Thomas Howell of Ffynonfelin
- 1781: William Mansel, 9th Baronet of Iscoed
- 1782: John Morgan of Furnace
- 1783: John Davies of Trawsmawr
- 1784: Robert Banks Hodgkinson of Overton and Rhydodin
- 1785: William Lewes of Llysnewydd
- 1786: John Lewis of Llwynffortun
- 1787: Hugh Meares of Llanstephan
- 1788: Richard Thomas of Cystanog
- 1789: Walter Thomas, of Wainrhydod
- 1790: William Paxton of Middleton hall
- 1791: George Griffles Williams of Llwynywormwood
- 1792: George Morgan Snr of Abercothi
- 1793: John Williams, of Wennalt (replacing John Llewellyn)
- 1794: William Clayton of Alltycadno
- 1795: John Rees of Cilymaenllwyd
- 1796: John William Hughes of Tregib
- 1797: David Saunders of Glanrhydw
- 1798: John Morgan of Furnace
- 1799: Richard Mansel-Philipps of Coedgain and Sketty Hall, Swansea
- 5 February 1800: Sir Gabriel Powell, of Capel Tydist

=== 19th century ===
- 11 February 1801: Thomas Stepney, of Derwydd
- 18 February 1801: Sir John Stepney, 8th Baronet, of Llanelli
- 17 March 1801: Edward Richard Shewen, of Stradey
- 10 February 1802: Thomas Owen, of Glasallt
- 3 February 1803: John Llewellyn, of Castle Piggin
- 2 March 1803: John Johnes, of Dolaucothi
- 1 February 1804: John Simmons, of Llangennech Park
- 6 February 1805: John Josiah Holford, of Cilgwyn
- 1 February 1806: George Price Watkins, of Broadway
- 4 February 1807: John Morgan, of the Furnace, Carmarthen
- 18 February 1807: Sackville Gwynne, of Glanbrane (appointment vacated)
- 4 March 1807: William Lloyd, of Laques
- 3 February 1808: Morgan Pryse Lloyd, of Glansevin
- 6 February 1809: Richard Isaac Starke, of Laugharne Castle
- 31 January 1810: Thomas Stepney, of Dan-yr-allt
- 21 February 1810: William McClary, of Manersabon
- 8 February 1811: Sir James Hamlyn-Williams, 2nd Baronet, of Edwinsford
- 24 January 1812: John George Philipps, of Cwmgwili
- 10 February 1813: Thomas Philipps, of Aberglasney
- 4 February 1814: Nicholas Burnell Jones, of Pantglas
- 13 February 1815: George Meares, of Plas Llanstephan
- 1816: John Colby of Ffynnonau
- 1817: George Lloyd of Brunant
- 1818: Lewis Price Jones, Glanyrannell
- 1819: David Heron Pugh of Greenhill
- 1820: Ralph Stephen Pemberton of Llanelly
- 1821: Walter Rice Powell of Maesgwynne
- 1822: John Howell Bevan of Pengay
- 1823: John Philipps of Crugifan
- 1824: George Morgan Jnr of Abercothi
- 1825: David Jones of Blaen-nos
- 1826: William Du Buisson of Glynhir
- 1827: Joseph Gulston of Derwydd
- 1828: William Chambers of Llanelli House
- 1829: Sir William Dundas, 2nd Baronet, of Wauncrychydd
- 1830: Rees Goring Thomas, of Llanen
- 1831: Edward Hamlyn Adams, of Middleton Hall
- 1832: John Lavallin Puxley, of Llethr Llestri
- 1833: David Lewis, of Stradey Castle
- 1834: John Lloyd Price, of Glangwilly
- 1835: Edward Rose Tunno, of Llangennech Park
- 1836: Richard Janion Neville, of Llanelly
- 1837: William Henry Wilson, of Pen-y-coed
- 1838: Howel Gwyn, of Blaensawdde
- 1839: John Edward Saunders, of Glanrhydw
- 1840: John Lloyd Price, of Glangwilly
- 1841: John Walters Philipps, of Aberglasney
- 1842: William Phillips, of Waun iago
- 1843: William Peel, of Taliaris
- 1844: Rawleigh Addenbrooke Mansel, of Llanddarog
- 1845: David Jones, of Glanebrane Park, Llandovery
- 1846: Sir John Mansel, 11th Baronet, of Llanstephan
- 1847: Sir James Cockburn, 9th Baronet, of Ddolgwm
- 1848: Sir James Williams-Drummond, 3rd Baronet, of Edwinsford
- 1849: Walter Rice Howell Powell, of Maesgwynne
- 1850: William Davys Harries Campbell Davys, of Neuadd fawr
- 1851: Timothy Powell, of Penycoed
- 1852: Charles Hamlyn Williams, of Derlys Court
- 1853: William Henry Yelverton, of Whitland Abbey
- 1854: John Jones, of Blaenos
- 1855: Edward Ab Adam, of Middleton Hall
- 1856: George Watkin Rice, of Llwynybrain
- 1857: Charles Morgan, of Alltygog
- 1858: William Morris, of Coomb
- 1859: Richard Jennings, of Gellydêg
- 1860: Alan James Gulston, of Llwynberllan
- 1861: Arthur Henry Saunders Davies, of Pentre
- 1862: Col. John Stepney Cowell-Stepney, of Llanelly House
- 1863: Isaac Horton, of Ystrad
- 1864: Henry Lavallin Puxley, of Llwyndrussy
- 1865: Edward Morris Davies, of Upland, near Carmarthen
- 1866: Thomas Charles Morris, of Brynmyrddin
- 1867: John Lennox Griffith Poyer Lewis, of Henllan
- 1868: Charles William Nevill, of Westfa, Llanelli
- 1869: Henry James Bath, of Alltyferin
- 1870: Henry Foley, of Abermarlais Park
- 1871: William Du Buisson of Glynhir, Llanelly
- 1872: Astley Thompson of Glyn Abbey
- 1873: Sir John Ferguson Davie, 2nd Baronet, of Derllys Court and Creedy, Sandford, Devon
- 1874: David Pugh of Manoravon
- 1875: Howard Spear Morgan of Tegfynydd, Llanfallteg
- 1876: James Buckley of Pen-y-fai
- 1877: Robert Parnall of Llanstephan Cottage
- 1878: John Beynon of Trewern
- 1879: Edward Schaw Protheroe of Dolwilym
- 1880: William Francis David Saunders of Glanrhydw
- 1881: Charles William Mansel Lewis of Stradey Castle
- 1882: Thomas Morris of Cwm, Llangynog
- 1883: John Peel of Danyrailt
- 1884: Sir Emile Algernon Arthur Keppel Cowell-Stepney, Bt, of The Dell, Llanelly
- 1885: James Hamlyn Williams-Drummond, Bt of Edwinsford
- 1886: Sir James Hills-Johnes, of Dolaucothi
- 1887: Frederick Arthur Gerwyn Jones of Pantglas
- 1888: John Williams Gwynne Hughes of Tregib
- 1889: Walter Powell Jeifreys of Cynghordy
- 1890: Herbert Peel, of Taliarris Park, Llandilo
- 1891: John Carbery Vaughan Pryse-Rice, of Llwynybrain, Llandovery
- 1892: Edward Henry Bath, of Alltyferin, Carmarthen
- 1893: John Crow Richardson, of Glanbrydan Park, Llandilo
- 1894: Antony William John Stokes, of Ystradwrallt, Carmarthen,
- 1895: James Bnckley, of Bryncaerau, Llanelly
- 1896: David Evans, of Llangennech Park, near Llanelly
- 1897: William Joseph Buckley, of Penyfai, Llanelly,
- 1898: St. Vincent Peel, of Dan-yr-allt, Llangadock,
- 1899: Gwilym Evans, of Westfa, Llanelly
- 1900: Benjamin Evans, of Llwynderw, West Cross, Swansea,

=== 20th century ===
- 1901: Ernest Trubshaw, of Aelybryn, Llanelly
- 1902: John Morgan Davies, of Froodvale, Llanwrda
- 1903: Richard Edward Jennings, of Gellidêg, Kidwelly
- 1904: Sir John Williams, Bt., of the Plas, Llanstephan
- 1905: Howard Meuric Lloyd, of Delfryn, Llanwrda,
- 1906: Arthur Edmund Du Buisson, of Glynhir, near Llandeilo
- 1907: Godfrey Evan Schaw Protheroe-Beynon, of Trewern Mansion, Whitland
- 1908: Thomas Henry Dowdeswell, of The Cottage, Llanstephan
- 1909: Morgan Jones, of Llanmiloe, Pendine
- 1910: Alfred Robert Orton Gery, of Royston Court, Ferryside
- 1911: Thomas Griffiths, of Glanmor, Burry Port
- 1912: Thomas Jones of Llanelly
- 1913: Joseph Williams of Llanelly
- 1914: Henry Morton Glyn Evans of Llangennech
- 1915: John Henry Thomas of London
- 1916: William Yalden Nevill of Felinfoel House
- 1917: David Williams of Llanelly
- 1918: Thomas Lewis of Nantgaredig
- 1919: Harry Dawkin Evans of Llanelly
- 1920: Henry Coulson Bond of Margrave Court, Berkshire
- 1921: David Richards of Ammanford
- 1922: Sir Alfred Stephens of Kidwelly
- 1923: Evan Williams, of Glyndwr, Pontardulais
- 1924: William Nathaniel Jones of Dyffryn, Ammanford
- 1925: Henry Folland of Blackpill, Glamorganshire
- 1926: John Waddell of Beenham, Berkshire
- 1927: Lewis Davies Lewis of Rhydargaeau
- 1928: Francis John Eees, of Warborough, Llanelly
- 1929: Major John Maybery Bevan of Glyn-clydach, Neath.
- 1930: Daniel Daniel, of Ffynone, Boncath, Pembrokeshire
- 1931: Joseph Pascoe Williams, of Cefnbryn, Llanelly
- 1932: Thomas Bevan of The Hendre, Llangennech, Llanelly
- 1933: David Farr Davies of Gwernllwyn, Cross Hands, Llanelly
- 1934: Owen Picton Davies of Clapham Park, London
- 1935: Timothy Evans of Bracknell Gardens, Hampstead, London, N.W.3
- 1936: John William Nicholas, of Brynteilo, Llandilo
- 1937: Thomas Brown Stephens, of Woodberry Down, London
- 1938: George Phillips, of Cilyblaidd, Pencarreg, Llanybyther
- 1939: David John Thomas of New Road, Llanelly
- 1940: Esau Arthur Williams, of Pontardulais, Swansea
- 1941: Arthur Davies Jones, of "Tower Hill", Old Road, Llanelly
- 1942: Charles Ronald Mansel Lewis, of Stradey Castle, Llanelly
- 1943: Joseph Rolfe, of Goodig;.Burry-Port, Carmarthen
- 1944: Lieut.-Col. Alexander Hugh Dickson Smith, of Glan Arthen, Llanelly
- 1945: Reginald William Holmes, of Penyfai, Llanelly
- 1946: Thomas Stone of Sketty, Swansea
- 1947: Edgar George Rees, of Llwyneithin, Llanelly
- 1948: Thomas Oswald Lewis, of Warborough, Old Road, Llanelly
- 1949: Thomas White Thomas, of "Roselawn", Kidwelly
- 1950: Lieut.-Colonel William Howell Buckley, of Castell Gorfod, St. Clears, Carmarthen
- 1951: William Hughes Mathias, of Llwynbedw, Whitland
- 1952: Thomas Ellis Jones-Davies of " Penrhyn ", Penllwyn Park, Carmarthen
- 1953: David Ewart Wilson, of Woodfield, Old Road, Llanelly
- 1954: Arwyn Sulgwyn Lewis of " Neuadd-Deg", Carmarthen
- 1955: Hugh William Lewis-Philipps of Clyngwynne, Llanboidy, Whitland
- 1956: Captain Hector Leighton Davies, of Fairwood Lodge, Killay, Swansea.
- 1957: Richard Edward Christopher Jennings, of Gellideg, Kidwelly
- 1958: Lieut-Colonel Richard Ryder Davies, of Danycraig, St. Clears.
- 1959: Edward Bertram Rees, of Mount Hill, Carmarthen
- 1960: John Godfrey Protheroe-Beynon of Hurst House, Laugharne.
- 1961: Mollie Doreen Phillips, of Cilyblaidd, Pencarreg, Llanybyther
- 1962: David Idris Davies, of "Wernlas", Talley, Llandeilo.
- 1963: Major Terrance Vincent Fisher-Hoch of Plas Llanstephan.
- 1964: Hugh John Vaughan Campbell, 6th Earl Cawdor (otherwise Viscount Emlyn), of Golden Grove House, Broad Oak.
- 1965: David Courtenay Mansel-Lewis of Stradey Castle, Llanelly.
- 1966: William John Davies, of Cyncoed, Llandovery.
- 1967: Major William Kemmis Buckley, of Brian Cottage, Ferryside.
- 1968: Peter George Francis, of Hafodneddyn, Llandeilo.
- 1969: Captain John Lionel Francis, of Llwynhelig, Llandeilo.
- 1970: Nesta Donne Fisher-Hoch, of Plas Llanstephan.
- 1971: Josephine Reene Thomas, of Warborough, Old Road, Llanelli.
- 1972: Griffith William Grismond Philipps, of Cwmgwili, Bronwydd Arms.
- 1973: David Joseph Harry Thomas of Paviland Manor, Rhossili, Gower.
- 1974 onwards – See High Sheriff of Dyfed
