= Gwynfe =

Village in Carmarthenshire, Wales

Coordinates: 51.8816°N 3.8570°W

Gwynfe: Welsh: Capel Gwynfe
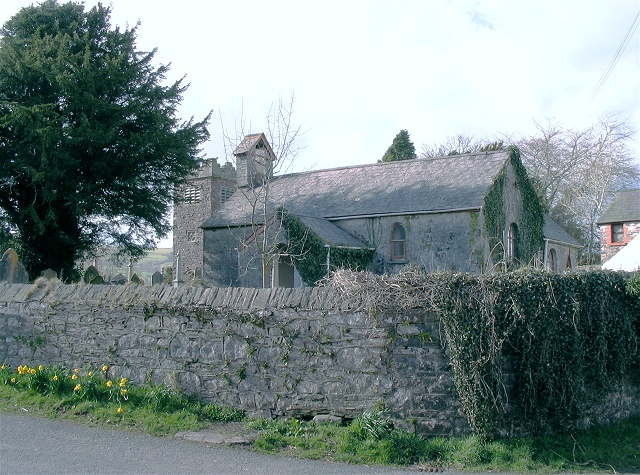
- Gwynfe Church and Church Hall in 2006

- Location within Carmarthenshire
- OS grid reference: SN720218
- Community: Llangadog
- Principal area: Carmarthenshire
- Preserved county: Dyfed
- Country: Wales
- Sovereign state: United Kingdom
- Post town: Llangadog
- Postcode district: SA19
- Police: Dyfed-Powys
- Fire: Mid and West Wales
- Ambulance: Welsh
- UK Parliament: Caerfyrddin
- Senedd Cymru – Welsh Parliament: Carmarthen East and Dinefwr

Gwynfe (Welsh pronunciation) or Capel Gwynfe is a small village inside the portion of Brecon Beacons National Park that is in Carmarthenshire, a county of southwestern Wales. This village is situated between Trichrug and the western slopes of the Black Mountain, to the west of the A4069 road about halfway between Llangadog and Brynamman. The village comprises a scattered collection of mostly nineteenth and twentieth-century housing that developed around several chapels. The area around the village is mainly farmland and the village was 2004 'Village of the Year for Carmarthenshire'. The village has a grade-two listed phone box now used as an information centre and a modern community hall built in 2001. The community association have erected 2 large woodcarvings of three red kites.

== History ==
The village developed with the founding of the turnpike road past the village church, which is on a site continuously occupied by a church since around 1710. The current church was built in 1899. An older chapel of ease, built in around 1812, is now used as the church hall. The village also has two chapels, Capel Maen dating from 1852, and Jerusalem chapel built in 1827.

The 1870-72 Imperial Gazetteer of England and Wales described Gwynfe chapelry as:

Gwynfe, a chapelry in Llangadock parish, Carmarthen; under the Black Mountain, and near the Mid Wales railway, in the neighbourhood of Llangadock. Post town, Llangadock, under Carmarthen. Real property, £3,083. Pop., 1,354. Houses, 271. Gwynfe House is a chief residence. The living is a p. curacy in the diocese of St. Davids. Value, £107. Patron, the Vicar of Llangadock-Vawr.

— John Marius Wilson, Imperial Gazetteer of England and Wales, 1870-72

The village previously had a number of services that are no longer present including 2 pubs, a school, 2 smithies, a corn mill and a woollen factory.

== Notable residents ==
- The missionaries David Griffiths, William Griffiths and David Williams were born in the village.
- The physician and manuscript collector Sir John Williams was born in the village at Bailey in 1840 as third son to David and Eleanor Williams of Blaenllynant where he was raised. He was physician accoucheur to Queen Mary from when she was the Duchess of York at the births of the later Kings Edward VIII and George VI; and he was Founder President from 1907 of the National Library of Wales and President from 1913 of the University College of Wales Aberystwyth, in both cases until his death at Aberystwyth in 1926.
- Beriah Gwynfe Evans spent much of his life in the village and took it as part of his name. He was Gwynfe British School Schoolmaster during 1867 to 1882, followed by Cwmllwyd born John Williams during 1882 to 1909 - husband to Cwmsite born Elizabeth née Williams a granddaughter of Morgan Williams of Blaenllynant and Plasnewydd, who was elder brother of Sir John Williams's father David.
