= Beriah Gwynfe Evans =

Welsh journalist and politician (1848–1927)

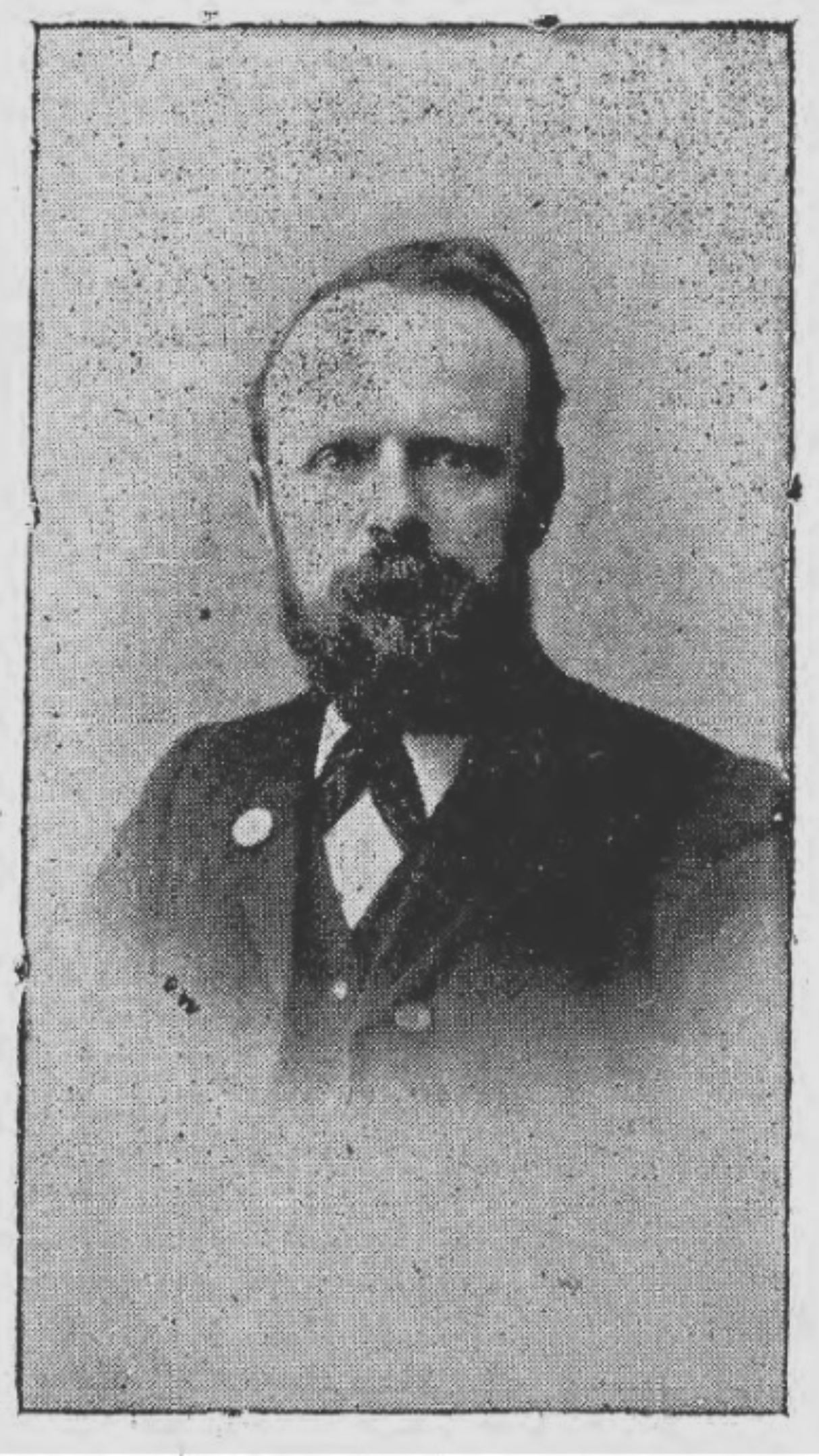
- Evans in 1895
- Born: 12 February 1848
- Died: 4 November 1927 (aged 79)
- Education: Beauford British School
- Occupations: Politician, Congregationalist, Journalist, Dramatist
- Political party: Liberal; Plaid Cymru

Beriah Gwynfe Evans (12 February 1848 – 4 November 1927) was a journalist, Congregationalist, dramatist, Liberal politician and Welsh Nationalist.

== Early life ==
Born at Nant-y-glo, near Ebbw Vale in Monmouthshire, Evans was educated at the Beaufort British School and became a teacher at Gwynfe and Llangadog, Carmarthenshire. However, his ambition was to become a journalist.

== Teacher and playwright ==
Early in his teaching career, Evans is known to have used the Welsh Not, a practice he later deeply regretted.

As a playwright, Evans helped to introduce a sceptical Nonconformity to contemporary drama with a patriotic play, Owain Glyndŵr, performed at the Llanberis Eisteddfod of 1879. Evans was heavily involved in Welsh language literature and publishing, as a member of the Gorsedd.

== Journalist ==
In 1880, Evans established the monthly magazine Cyfail yr Aelwyd, and in 1887 gave up teaching for a career in journalism, joining the staff of the South Wales Daily News in Cardiff. Concurrently he edited the Welsh section of the Cardiff Times and South Wales Weekly News. In 1892, he moved to Caernarfon as Managing Editor of the Welsh National Press Co., publishers of Y Genedl Gymreig, The North Wales Observer and other papers. In 1917 he became editor of the Congregationalist weekly Y Tyst.

Beriah Evans was an ally of David Lloyd George and others present at the Newport meeting of 16 January 1896. As Secretary of Cymru Fydd from 1895, Evans was in the vanguard of its offensive across Wales. Lloyd George spoke against a motion to make Evans's post at Newport merely unpaid and honorary, "and curiously enough we carried that." Once Lloyd George had swung the meeting against the resolution, the decision was made to exclude him from any discussion on the second motion, that of four sub-federations. The Cardiff Cymru Fydd society became known as "Beriah's baumkin". He then turned his hand to writing novels and produced a fine biography of Lloyd George. In his final years, he joined the infant Plaid Cymru. Evans, as a Liberal Imperialist, broke with Lloyd George over the Boer War.

== Works ==
- The Life Romance of Lloyd George (1915)
- Owain Glyndŵr (play) (1880)
- Dafydd Davis (novel) (1898)
- Map y rhyfel yng ngwledydd y Beibl yn dangos safle a symudiadau y gwahanol fyddinoedd yn eu perthynas a theiliau hanesyddol y Beibl (map) (1916)
