= Plas Llanstephan =

Country house in Carmarthenshire, Wales

Coordinates: 51.7684°N 4.3937°W

Plas Llanstephan is a mansion in the county of Carmarthenshire, Wales. It is set well back from the public road among pasture fields and is reached by a private driveway from the village of Llansteffan. Both the hall and the stable block are grade II listed buildings. Llansteffan Castle overlooks the house from the summit of a low hill to the southeast.

Plas Llanstephan was built in the second half of the 16th century by the Lloyd family. The Lloyd family inhabited Plas until 1767, when it was acquired by the Meares family of Eastington.

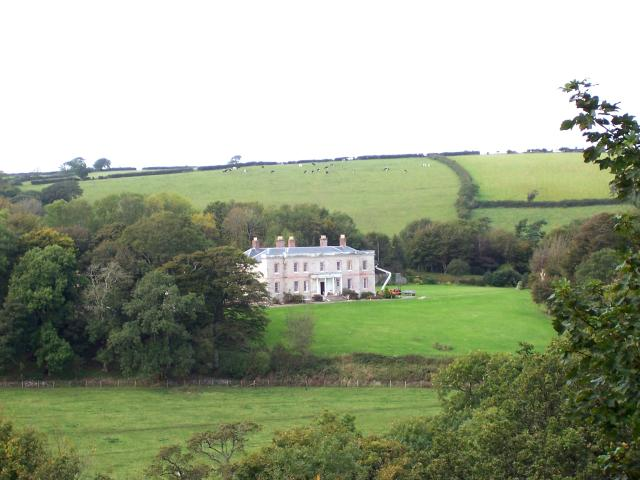
Plas Llanstephan

It then passed to the family of Morris who were bankers in Carmarthen. For parts of the 19th century, the mansion was leased out to Sir James John Hamilton, and Sir John Williams (1840–1926). It was sold in 1920 to Sir Owen Cosby Philipps (1863–1937), politician and shipping magnate. He was made Lord Kylsant in 1923. The house passed to his wife, Lady Kylsant, on his death. On the death of Lady Kylsant in December 1952 it was inherited by her eldest daughter Nesta Donne Fisher-Hoch. Her husband held the position of High Sheriff of Carmarthenshire in 1963, as did she in 1970.

The grounds at Plas include one of the largest walled gardens in Wales. The stable block is dated 1788 and is thought to have been designed by John Nash. The property was sold in 2000 when the house was in dire need of a complete overhaul. Both the hall and the associated stable block are grade II* listed buildings.

The house has a U-shaped plan and is built round a central court. The walls are built from rubble stone and stuccoed, with slate roofs and red brick chimneys. It is a two-storey building in late Georgian style with five windows across the facade and a single window on each forward-projecting wing. A flight of seven broad stone steps lead to the porticoed main door. The stable block and various outbuildings lie behind the house, which has a fine eighteenth century interior.
