= Battle of the River Plate =

First naval battle of the Second World War

- Part of the American Theatre of World War II
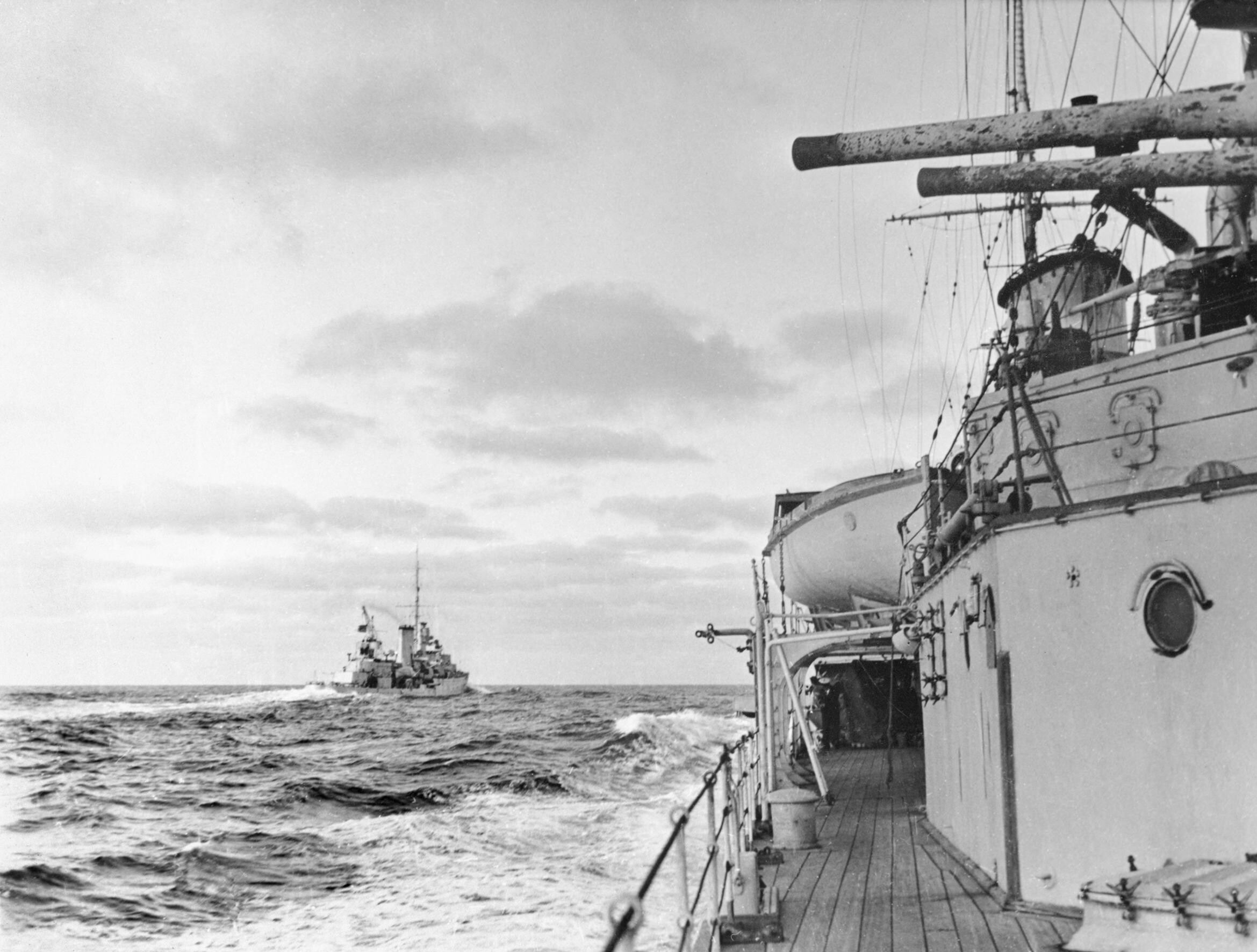
- HMS Achilles as seen from HMS Ajax during the battle
Date	13–17 December 1939
Location	Off the River Plate, South Atlantic 34°S 49°W
Result	Allied victory

Belligerents
United Kingdom; New Zealand	Germany

Commanders and leaders
Henry Harwood	Hans Langsdorff

Strength
Heavy cruiser Exeter; Light cruiser Achilles; Light cruiser Ajax	Panzerschiff Admiral Graf Spee

Casualties and losses
72 killed 28 wounded	36 killed 60 wounded Admiral Graf Spee scuttled

The Battle of the River Plate was fought in the South Atlantic on 13 December 1939 as the first British naval battle of the Second World War.

The Kriegsmarine heavy cruiser Admiral Graf Spee, commanded by Captain Hans Langsdorff, engaged a Royal Navy squadron, commanded by Commodore Henry Harwood, comprising the light cruisers HMS Ajax, HMNZS Achilles (on loan to the New Zealand Division) and the heavy cruiser HMS Exeter.

Graf Spee had sailed into the South Atlantic in August 1939, before the war began, and had begun commerce raiding after receiving authorisation on 26 September 1939. Harwood's squadron was one of several search groups sent in pursuit by the British Admiralty and sighted Graf Spee off the estuary of the River Plate (a.k.a. the Río de la Plata) near the coasts of Argentina and Uruguay.

In the ensuing battle, Exeter was severely damaged and forced to retire, making for the Falklands; Ajax and Achilles suffered moderate damage. Damage to Graf Spee, although not extensive, was critical because her fuel system was crippled. Ajax and Achilles shadowed the German ship until she entered the port of Montevideo, the capital of neutral Uruguay, to effect urgent repairs. Langsdorff was told that his stay could not be extended beyond 72 hours. Apparently believing that the British had gathered a superior force to await his departure, he ordered for the ship to be scuttled on 17 December. Langsdorff died by suicide two days later.

== Background ==
Admiral Graf Spee had been at sea at the start of the Second World War in September 1939 and had sunk several merchantmen in the Indian Ocean and South Atlantic Ocean without loss of life because of her captain's policy of taking all crews on board before sinking the victim.

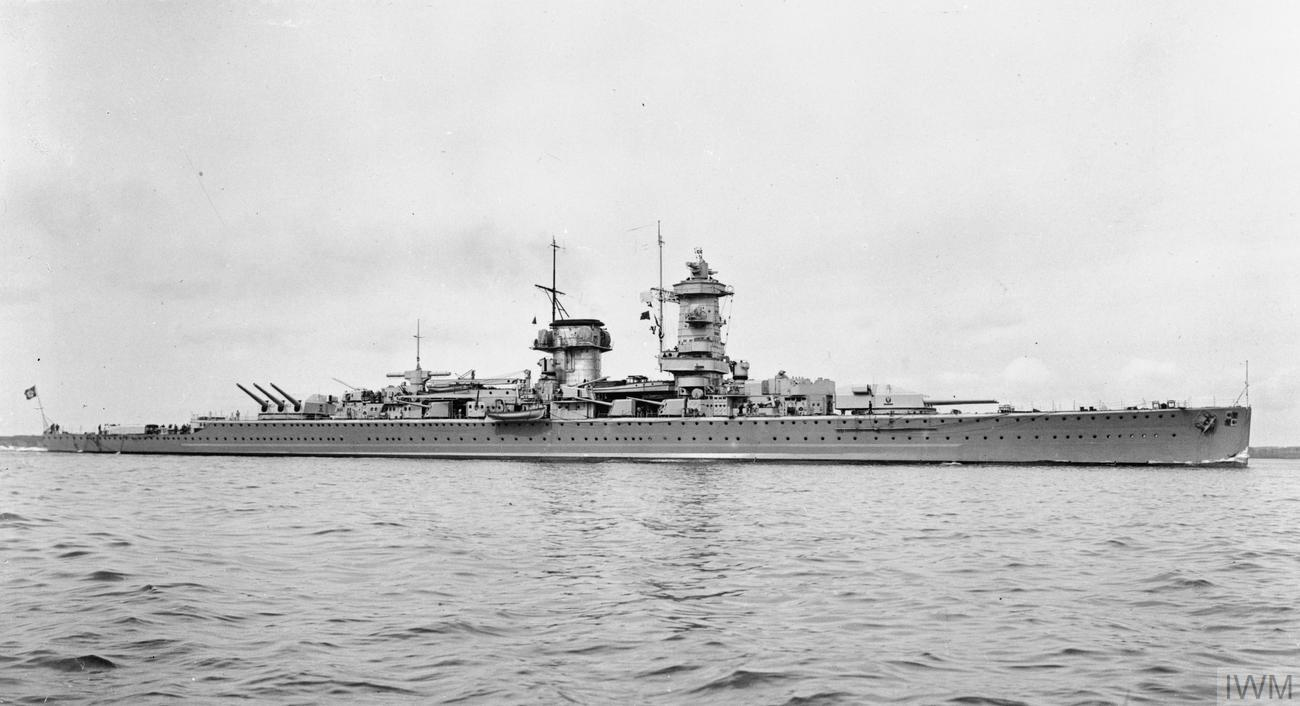
Admiral Graf Spee

The Royal Navy assembled nine forces to search for the surface raider: Force G, the South American Cruiser Squadron, comprised the County-class heavy cruiser HMS Cumberland of 10,570 long tons (10,740 t) with eight 8-inch (203 mm) guns in four turrets, the York-class heavy cruiser HMS Exeter of 8,390 long tons (8,520 t) with six 8-inch (203 mm) guns in three turrets, and two Leander-class light cruisers, HMS Ajax and HMNZS Achilles, both of 7,270 long tons (7,390 t) with eight 6-inch (150 mm) guns. Although technically a heavy cruiser because of the calibre of her guns, Exeter was a scaled-down version of the County class. The force was commanded by Commodore Henry Harwood whose flagship was Ajax, captained by Charles Woodhouse. Achilles was on loan to the New Zealand Division (precursor to the Royal New Zealand Navy) and captained by Edward Parry. Exeter was commanded by Captain Frederick Secker Bell.

At the time of the battle, Cumberland (commanded by Captain Walter Herman Gordon Fallowfield) was refitting in the Falkland Islands but was available for sea at short notice. Force G was supported by the oilers RFA Olna, RFA Olynthus, and RFA Orangeleaf. Olynthus replenished HMS Ajax and Achilles on 22 November 1939, and Exeter on 26 November, at San Borombon Bay. Olynthus was also directed to keep observation between Medanos and Cape San Antonio, off Argentina south of the River Plate estuary (see chart below).

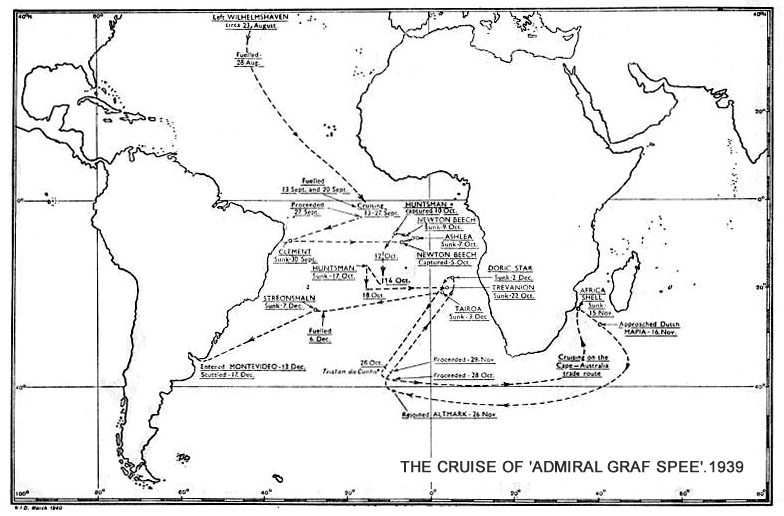
The route of Admiral Graf Spee's cruise, from the British HMSO report.

Following a raider-warning radio message from the merchantman Doric Star, which was sunk by Admiral Graf Spee off South Africa, Harwood suspected that the raider would try to strike next at the merchant shipping off the River Plate estuary between Uruguay and Argentina. He ordered his squadron to steam toward the position 32° south, 47° west. Harwood chose that position, according to his dispatch, because it was the most congested part of the shipping routes in the South Atlantic and therefore the point at which a raider could do the most damage to enemy shipping. A Norwegian freighter saw Admiral Graf Spee practising the use of her searchlights and radioed that her course was toward South America; the three available cruisers of Force G rendezvoused off the estuary on 12 December and conducted manoeuvres.

Regarding strategy, the British combat instructions for engaging a pocket battleship with a cruiser squadron had been devised by Harwood himself during his period at the Royal Naval War College between 1934 and 1936. The strategy specified an attack at once, day or night. During the day, the ships would attack as two units, in this case with Exeter separate from Ajax and Achilles. At night, the ships would remain in company, but in open order. By attacking from two sides, Harwood hoped to give his lighter warships a chance of overcoming the German advantage of greater range and heavier broadside by dividing the enemy's fire. By splitting his force, Harwood would force the Germans to split their fire and reduce its effectiveness, or to keep it focused on one opponent and allow the other vessels to attack with less fear of return fire.

Although outgunned by Admiral Graf Spee and therefore at a tactical disadvantage, the British had the upper hand strategically since any raider returning to Germany would have to run the blockade of the North Sea and might reasonably be expected to encounter the Home Fleet. For victory, the British had only to damage the raider enough so that she was either unable to make the journey or unable to fight a subsequent battle with the Home Fleet (by contrast, the Germans would have to destroy the British force without being severely damaged). Because of overwhelming numerical superiority, the loss of even all three cruisers would not have severely altered Britain's naval capabilities, but Admiral Graf Spee was one of the Kriegsmarine's few capital ships. The British could, therefore, afford to risk a tactical defeat if it brought strategic victory.

== Battle ==
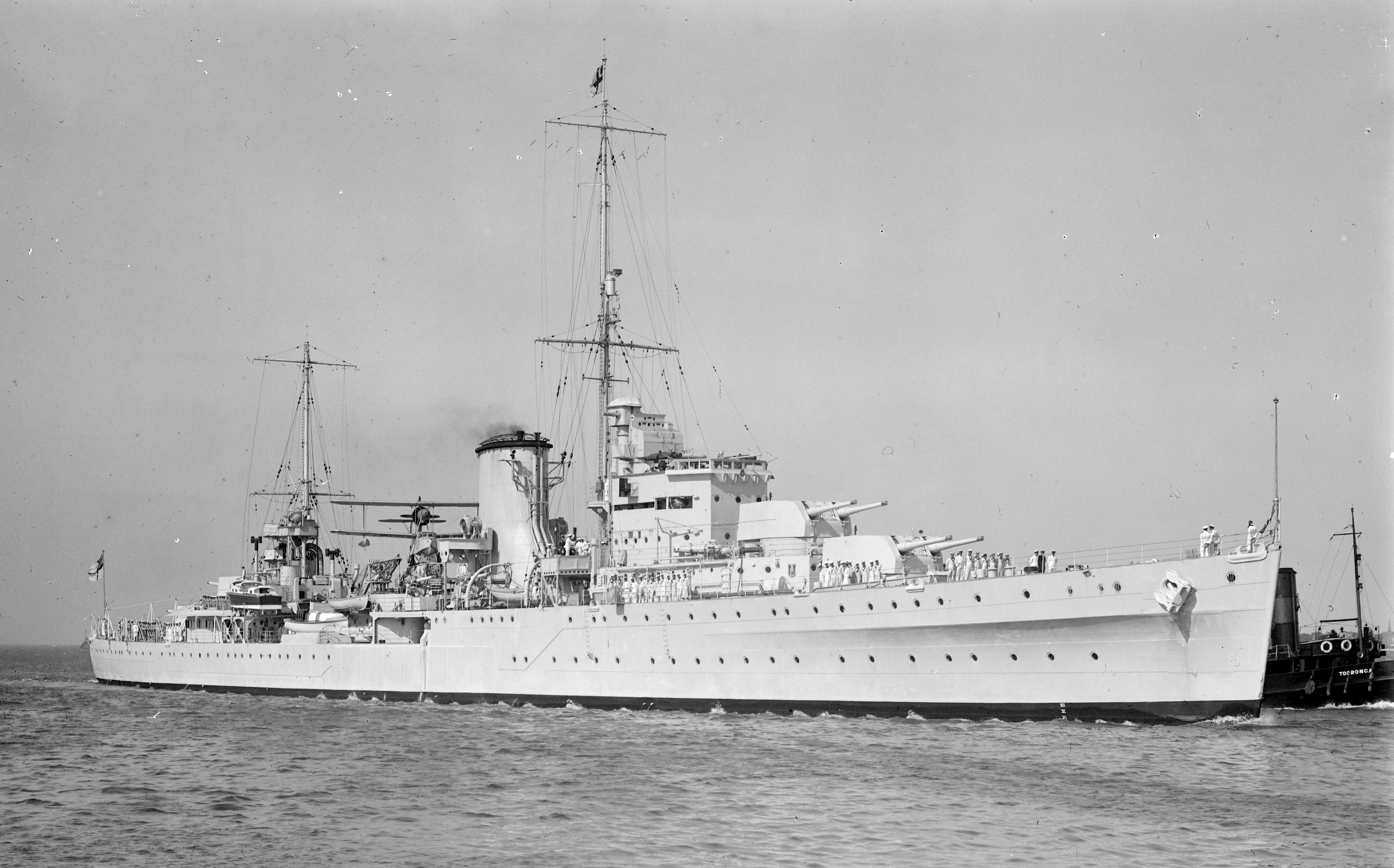
HMS Achilles

On 13 December at 05:20, the British squadron was proceeding on a course of 060° at 14 knots with Ajax at 34°34′S 48°17′W, 390 nmi (720 km) east of Montevideo. At 06:10, smoke was sighted on a bearing of Red-100, or 320° (to the north-west). Harwood ordered the Exeter to investigate. She swung out of line, and at 06:16, she signaled by lamp: "I think it is a pocket-battleship". Captain Bell ordered Flag N hoisted to the yard arm – "Enemy in sight". Graf Spee had already sighted mastheads and identified Exeter but initially suspected that the two light cruisers were smaller destroyers and that the British ships were protecting a merchant convoy, the destruction of which would be a major prize. Since Graf Spee's reconnaissance aircraft was out of service, Langsdorff relied on his lookouts for that information. He decided to engage despite having received a broadly accurate report from the German naval staff on 4 December. It outlined British activity in the River Plate area and included information that Ajax, Achilles, Cumberland and Exeter were patrolling the South American coast.

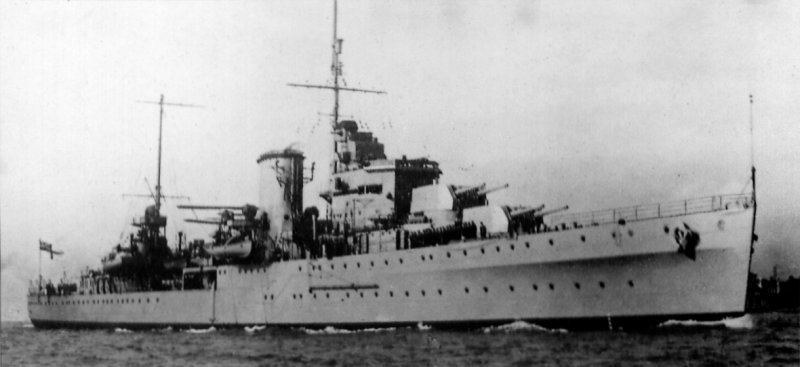
HMS Ajax

Langsdorff realised too late that he was facing three cruisers. Calling on the immediate acceleration of his diesel engines, he closed with the enemy squadron at 24 kn (28 mph; 44 km/h) in the hope of engaging the steam-driven British ships before they could work up from cruising speed to full power. An alternative strategy would have been keeping the British ships at a distance to destroy them with his 283 mm (11.1 in) guns and remaining out of range of their smaller 6-inch and 8-inch guns. However, Langsdorff knew the British cruisers had a 4–6 kn (4.6–6.9 mph; 7.4–11.1 km/h) speed advantage over Graf Spee and could stay out of range while calling for reinforcements.

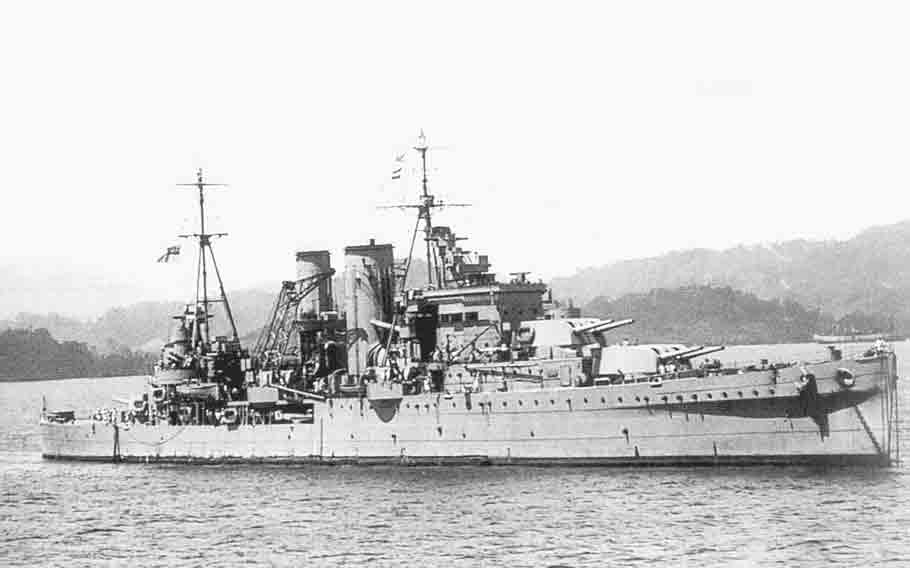
HMS Exeter

The British executed their battle plan: Exeter turned north-west, and Ajax and Achilles, operating together, turned north-east to spread Graf Spee's fire. Graf Spee opened fire on Exeter at 19,000 yd (17,000 m) with her six 283 mm (11.1 in) guns at 06:18. Exeter opened fire at 06:20, Achilles at 06:21, Exeter's aft guns at 06:22 and Ajax at 06:23. Lieutenant-Commander Richard Jennings, Exeter's gunnery officer remembers:

As I was crossing the compass platform [to his Action Station in the Director Control Tower], the captain hailed me, not with the usual rigmarole of "Enemy in sight, bearing, etc", but with "There's the fucking Scheer! Open fire at her!" Throughout the battle the crew of the Exeter thought they were fighting the [sister ship] Scheer. But the name of the enemy ship was of course the Graf Spee.

From her opening salvo, Graf Spee's gunfire proved fairly accurate, her third salvo straddling Exeter. At 06:23, a 283 mm (11.1 in) shell burst just short of Exeter, abreast the ship. Splinters from the shell killed the torpedo tubes' crews, damaged the ship's communications, riddled the ship's funnels and searchlights and wrecked the ship's Walrus aircraft just as it was about to be launched for gunnery spotting. Three minutes later, Exeter suffered a direct hit on her "B" turret, putting it and its two guns out of action. Shrapnel swept the bridge, killing or wounding all bridge personnel except the captain and two others. Captain Bell's communications were wrecked. Communications from the aft conning position were also destroyed. The ship had to be steered via a chain of messengers for the rest of the battle.

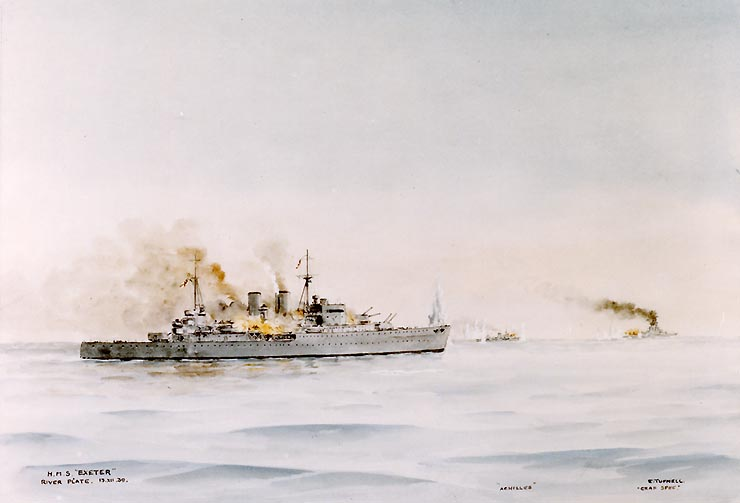
Painting depicting the cruisers HMS Exeter (foreground) and HMS Achilles (right centre background) in action with the German heavy cruiser Graf Spee (right background)

Meanwhile, Ajax and Achilles closed to 13,000 yd (12,000 m) and started making in front of Graf Spee, causing her to split her main armament at 06:30 and otherwise use her 150 mm (5.9 in) guns against them. Shortly after, Exeter fired two torpedoes from her starboard tubes but both missed. At 06:37, Ajax launched her Fairey Seafox spotter floatplane from her catapult. At 06:38, Exeter turned so that she could fire her port torpedoes and received two more direct hits from 283 mm (11.1 in) shells. One hit "A" turret and put it out of action, the other entered the hull and started fires. Exeter was severely damaged, having only "Y" turret still in action under "local" control, with Jennings on the roof shouting instructions to those inside. She also had a 7° list, was being flooded and being steered with the use of her small boat's compass. However, Exeter dealt the decisive blow; one of her 8-inch shells had penetrated two decks before exploding in Graf Spee's funnel area, destroyed her raw fuel processing system and left her with just 16 hours fuel, insufficient to allow her to return home.

At this point, nearly one hour after the battle had started, Graf Spee was doomed since she could not make fuel system repairs of that complexity under fire. Two thirds of her anti-aircraft guns were knocked out, as well as one of her secondary turrets. There were no friendly naval bases within reach or reinforcements available. She was not seaworthy and could make only the neutral port of Montevideo.

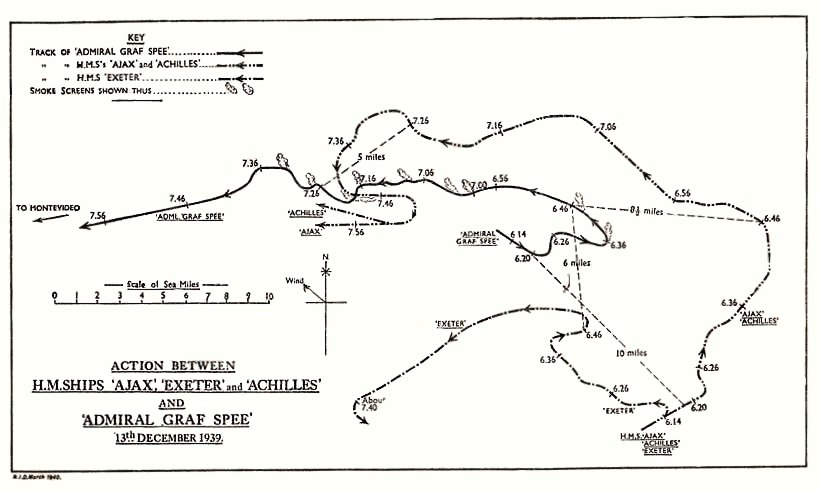
HMSO chart of the engagement

Graf Spee hauled round from an easterly course, now behind Ajax and Achilles, towards the north-west and laid smoke. That course brought Langsdorff roughly parallel to Exeter. By 06:50, Exeter listed heavily to starboard and took water forward. Nevertheless, she still steamed at full speed and fired with her one remaining turret. Forty minutes later, water splashed in by a 283 mm (11.1 in) near miss short-circuited her electrical system for that turret. Captain Bell was forced to break off the action. That would have been the opportunity to finish off Exeter. Instead, the combined fire of Ajax and Achilles drew Langsdorff's attention as both ships closed the German ship.

Twenty minutes later, Ajax and Achilles turned to starboard to bring all their guns to bear, causing Graf Spee to turn away and lay a smoke screen. At 07:10, the two light cruisers turned to reduce the range from 8 mi (7.0 nmi; 13 km) even though that meant that only their forward guns could fire. At 07:16, Graf Spee turned to port and headed straight for the badly damaged Exeter, but fire from Ajax and Achilles forced her at 07:20 to turn and fire her 283 mm (11.1 in) guns at them, while they turned to starboard to bring all their guns to bear. Ajax turned to starboard at 07:24 and fired her torpedoes at a range of 4.5 miles (3.9 nmi; 7.2 km), causing Graf Spee to turn away under a smoke screen. At 07:25, Ajax was hit by a 283 mm (11.1 in) shell that put "X" turret out of action and jammed "Y" turret, causing some casualties. By 07:40, Ajax and Achilles were running low on resources, and the British decided to change tactics and move to the east under a smokescreen. Harwood decided to shadow Graf Spee and try to attack at night, when he could attack with torpedoes, better use his advantages of speed and manoeuvrability and minimise his deficiencies in armour. Ajax was again hit by a 283 mm (11.1 in) shell that destroyed her mast and caused more casualties. Graf Spee continued to the south-west.

=== Pursuit ===
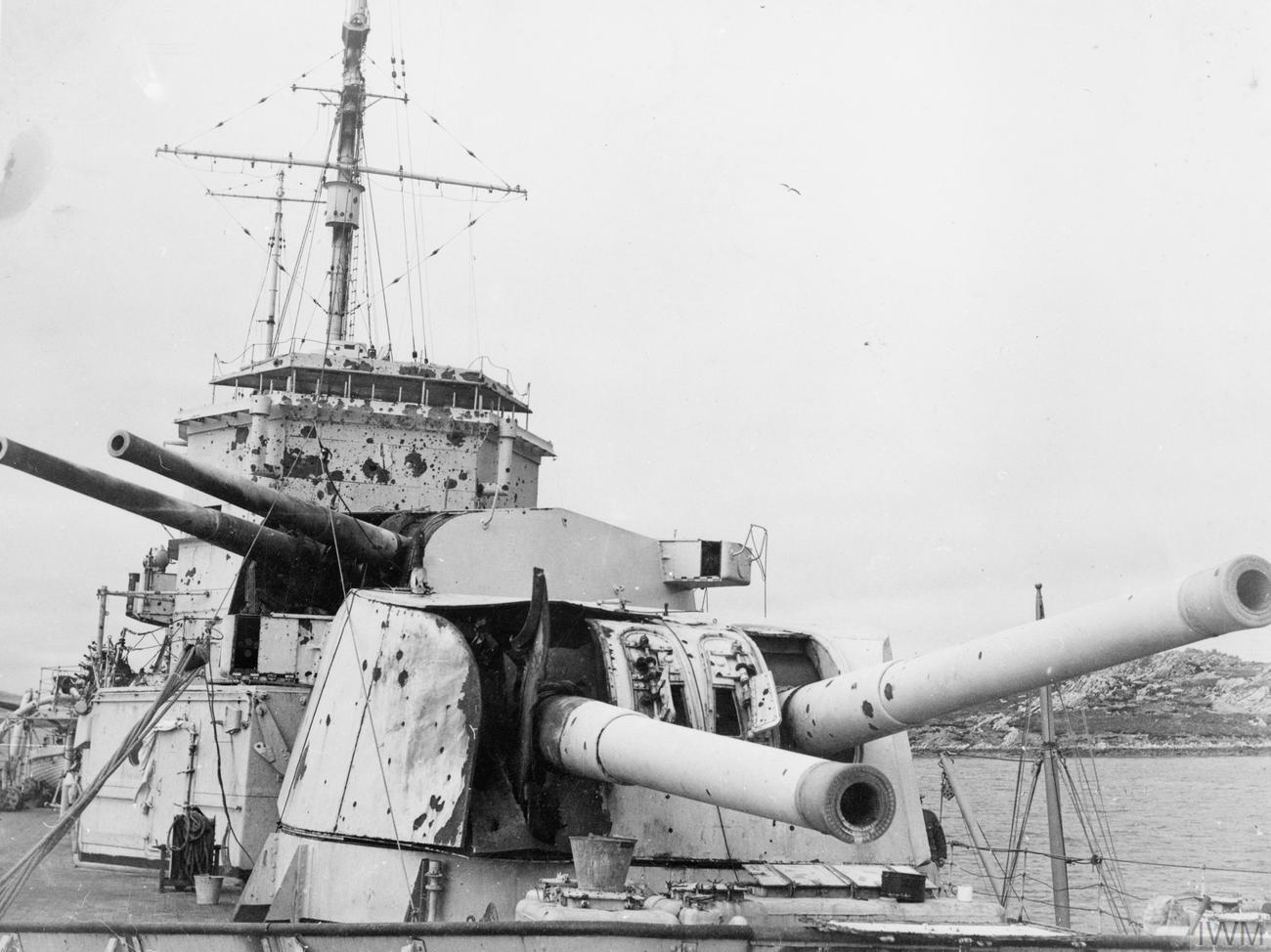
Damage received by Exeter during the Battle of the River Plate

The battle now turned into a pursuit. Captain Parry of Achilles wrote afterwards: "To this day I do not know why the Admiral Graf Spee did not dispose of us in the Ajax and the Achilles as soon as she had finished with the Exeter". The British and New Zealand cruisers split up, keeping about 15 mi (13 nmi; 24 km) from Admiral Graf Spee. Ajax kept to the German's port and Achilles to the starboard. At 09:15, Ajax recovered her aircraft. At 09:46, Harwood signalled to Cumberland for reinforcement and the Admiralty also ordered ships within 3,000 mi (2,600 nmi; 4,800 km) to proceed to the River Plate.

At 10:05, Achilles had overestimated Admiral Graf Spee's speed and came into range of the German guns. Admiral Graf Spee turned and fired two three-gun salvoes with her fore guns. Achilles turned away under a smokescreen.

According to Dudley Pope, a merchant ship was sighted at 11:03 close to Admiral Graf Spee. After a few minutes, Admiral Graf Spee called Ajax on W/T, probably on the international watchkeeping frequency of 500 kHz, and used both ships' pre-war call signs, with the signal: "please pick up lifeboats of English steamer". The German call sign was DTGS, confirming to Harwood that the pocket-battleship he had engaged was indeed Admiral Graf Spee. Ajax did not reply, but a little later, the British flagship closed with SS Shakespeare with her lifeboats still hoisted and men still on board. Admiral Graf Spee had fired a gun and ordered them to stop but when they did not obey orders to leave the ship, Langsdorff decided to continue on his way, and Shakespeare had a lucky escape. The shadowing continued for the rest of the day until 19:15, when Admiral Graf Spee turned and opened fire on Ajax, which turned away under a smokescreen.

It was now clear that Admiral Graf Spee was entering the River Plate estuary. Since the estuary had sandbanks, Harwood ordered Achilles to shadow Admiral Graf Spee while Ajax would cover any attempt to double back through a different channel. The sun set at 20:48, with Admiral Graf Spee silhouetted against the sun. Achilles had again closed the range and Admiral Graf Spee opened fire, forcing Achilles to turn away. During the battle, a total of 108 men had been killed on both sides, including 36 on Admiral Graf Spee.

Admiral Graf Spee entered Montevideo in neutral Uruguay and dropped anchor at about 00:10 on 14 December. That was a political error since Uruguay, while neutral, had benefited from significant British influence during its development and favoured the Allies. The British Hospital, for example, where the wounded from the battle were taken, was the leading hospital in the city. The port of Mar del Plata on the Argentine coast and 200 mi (170 nmi; 320 km) south of Montevideo would have been a better choice for Admiral Graf Spee.

=== Trap of Montevideo ===
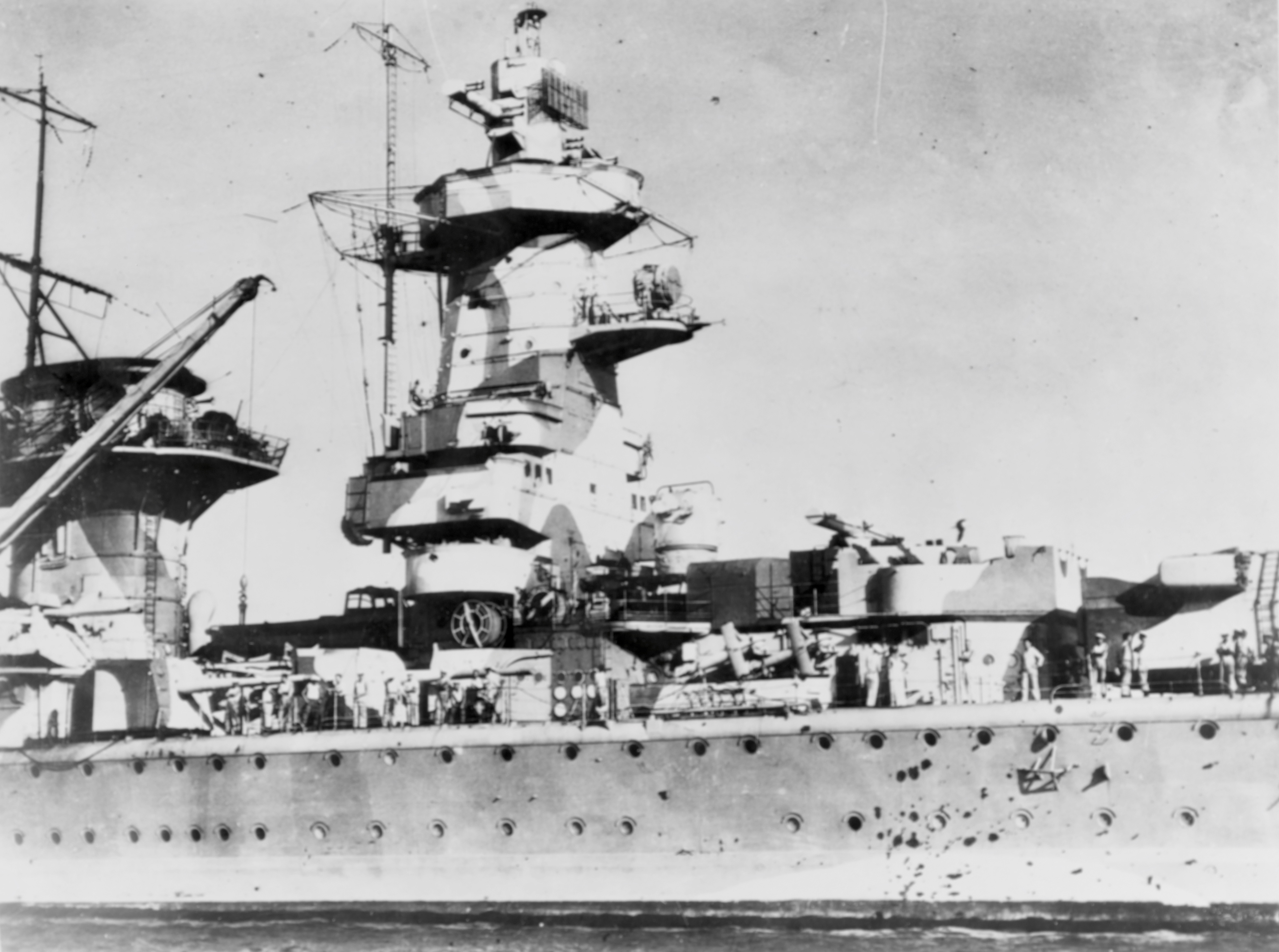
Admiral Graf Spee in Montevideo, with battle damage

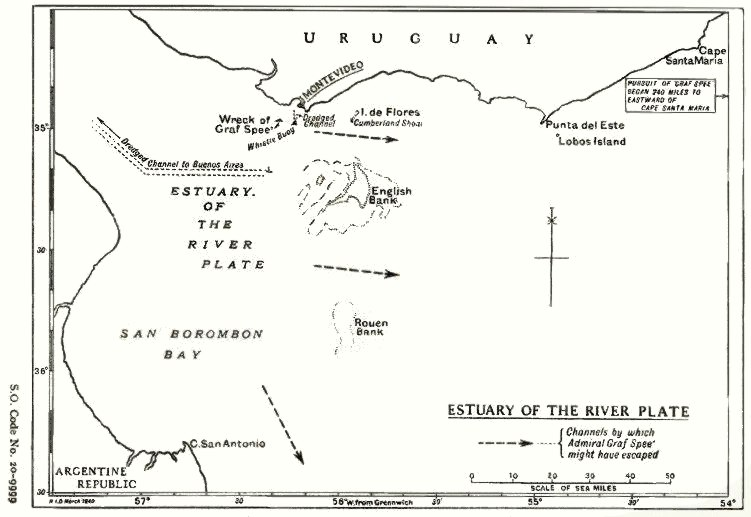
Map of the River Plate showing possible exit channels.

In Montevideo, the 13th Hague Convention came into play. Under Article 12, "belligerent war-ships are not permitted to remain in the ports, roadsteads or territorial waters of the said Power for more than twenty-four hours". Under Article 14, a "belligerent war-ship may not prolong its stay in a neutral port beyond the permissible time except on account of damage". British diplomats duly pressed for the speedy departure of the Graf Spee. Also relevant was Article 16 of which part reads, "A belligerent war-ship may not leave a neutral port or roadstead until twenty-four hours after the departure of a merchant ship flying the flag of its adversary".

In accordance with their obligations, the Germans released 61 captive British merchant seamen who had been on board. Langsdorff then asked the Uruguayan government for two weeks to make repairs. Initially, the British diplomats in Uruguay, principally Eugen Millington-Drake, made several requests for Admiral Graf Spee to leave port immediately. After consultation with London, which was aware that there were no significant British naval forces in the area, Millington-Drake continued to demand for Admiral Graf Spee to leave. At the same time, he arranged for British and French merchant ships to steam from Montevideo at intervals of 24 hours, whether they had originally intended to do so or not, thus invoking Article 16. That kept Admiral Graf Spee in port and allowed more time for British forces to reach the area.

At the same time, the British attempted to feed false intelligence to the Germans that an overwhelming British force was being assembled, including Force H (the aircraft carrier HMS Ark Royal and the battlecruiser HMS Renown) by broadcasting a series of signals, on frequencies known to be intercepted by German intelligence. In fact, the two cruisers had been joined only by Cumberland, which had arrived at 22:00 on 14 December, after steaming 1,014 nautical miles (1,878 km; 1,167 mi) from the Falkland Islands in 34 hours, at an average of over 90% of her full trials speed attained over much shorter distances. The older and larger Cumberland was more powerful than Exeter, with an additional aft turret containing two more 8-inch guns, but it was no match for Admiral Graf Spee whose guns had significantly longer range and fired much heavier shells (660 lb against 256 lb). Overwhelming British forces (HMS Renown, Ark Royal, Shropshire, Dorsetshire, and Neptune) were en route but would not assemble until 19 December although they could intercept earlier if Admiral Graf Spee headed north or north-east from Montevideo shadowed by Cumberland and her smaller consorts. For the time being, the total force comprised the undamaged Cumberland with a full ammunition load, and the damaged Ajax and Achilles with depleted stocks of shells. To reinforce the propaganda effect, these ships, which were waiting just outside the three-mile limit, were ordered to make smoke, which could be clearly seen from the Montevideo waterfront.

On 15 December 1939, Olynthus refuelled Ajax, which proved a difficult operation. The ship had to use hurricane hawsers to complete the replenishment. On 17 December Achilles was replenished from Olynthus off Rouen Bank.

The Germans were entirely deceived and expected to face a far superior force on leaving the River Plate. Admiral Graf Spee had also used two thirds of her 283 mm (11.1 in) ammunition and had enough left for approximately only a further 20 minutes of firing. Such a reduced ammunition stock was hardly sufficient for the ship to fight her way out of Montevideo against the large force expected, let alone get back to Germany. Even the only actual British newcomer, the previously unengaged Cumberland, could fight at full capacity for about 90 minutes and pursue at equal or higher speed for at least another 2,000 nautical miles (3,700 km; 2,300 mi) before she required replenishment at sea.

Meanwhile, as the Graf Spee remained in the bay, British diplomatic personnel based in Montevideo and Buenos Aires carefully watched her from shore 24 hours a day, and the expectation of a potential breakout and resumption of the battle caused tensions and anxiety to surge to enormous levels among British sailors and diplomats.

On the German side, while the ship was prevented from leaving the harbour, Captain Langsdorff consulted with his command in Germany. He received orders that permitted some options but not internment in Uruguay. The Germans feared that Uruguay could be persuaded to join the Allied cause. Ultimately, he chose to scuttle his ship in the River Plate estuary on 17 December to avoid unnecessary loss of life for no particular military advantage, a decision that infuriated Adolf Hitler.

The crew of Admiral Graf Spee were taken to Buenos Aires, Argentina, where Captain Langsdorff shot himself on 19 December. He was buried there with full military honours, and several British officers attended. Many of the crew members made their homes in Montevideo with the help of local people of German origin. The German dead were buried in the Cementerio del Norte, Montevideo.

== Aftermath ==
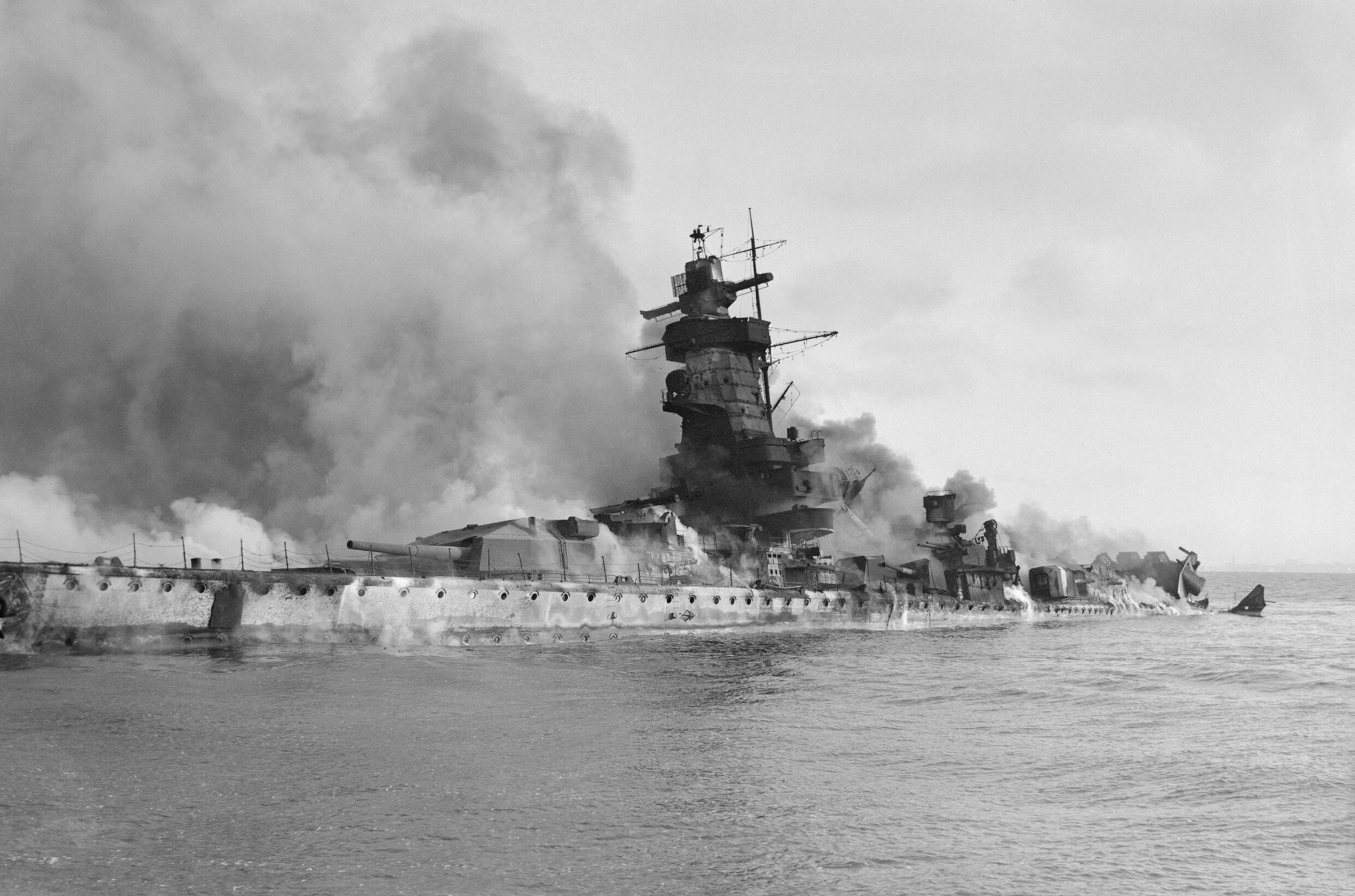
Admiral Graf Spee in flames after being scuttled in the River Plate estuary

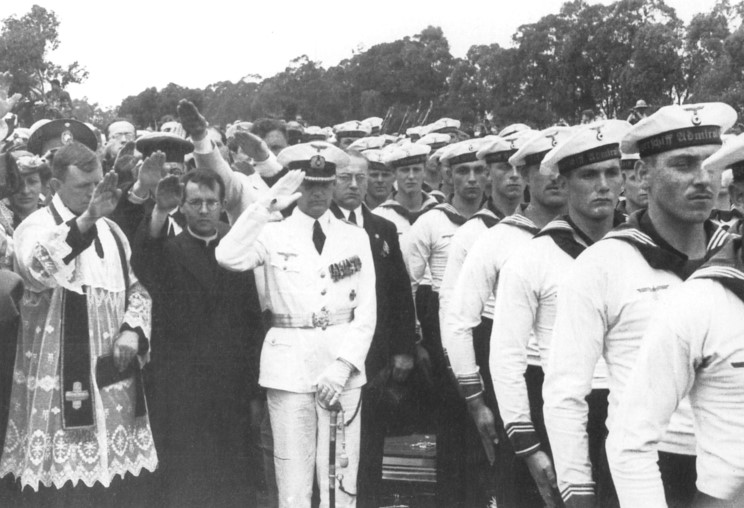
Captain Langsdorff at the funeral of crew members who were killed in the battle.

The German propaganda machine had reported that Admiral Graf Spee had sunk a heavy cruiser and heavily damaged two light cruisers and had been only lightly damaged herself. The scuttling of Admiral Graf Spee, however, was a severe embarrassment and difficult to explain on the basis of publicly available facts. The battle was a major victory for the British, as Ajax and Achilles were still capable warships and Exeter, as badly damaged as she was, had managed to reach the Falkland Islands for emergency repairs.

Lieutenant Atwill, who wrote an account of the battle in which he served on Exeter, detailed the damage done and the emergency repairs to make the ship seaworthy enough to reach Stanley, Falkland Islands. There were rumours that she would remain there and become a rusting hulk until the end of the war, but First Lord of the Admiralty Winston Churchill wrote to the First Sea Lord and others, "We ought not readily to accept the non-repair during the war of Exeter. She should be strengthened and strutted internally as far as possible . . . and come home". Exeter returned to Devonport for a 13-month refit.

While highly praised for his excellent performance in battle, Harwood received criticism directed towards his lack of initiative and for not employing a more aggressive approach; those criticisms are mostly due to Admiral Graf Spee being allowed to escape though outnumbered by ships able jointly to make a more damaging rate of fire.

Prisoners taken from merchant ships captured by Admiral Graf Spee who had been transferred to her supply ship Altmark were freed by a boarding party from the British destroyer HMS Cossack in the Altmark incident (16 February 1940) in the Jøssingfjorden, at the time neutral Norwegian waters. Prisoners who had not been transferred to Altmark had remained aboard Admiral Graf Spee during the battle; they were released on arrival in Montevideo.

On 22 December 1939, over 1,000 sailors from Admiral Graf Spee were taken to Buenos Aires and interned there; at least 92 were transferred during 1940 to a camp in Rosario, some were transferred to Club Hotel de la Ventana in Buenos Aires Province and another group to Villa General Belgrano, a small town founded by German immigrants in 1932. Some of these sailors later settled there. After the war many German sailors settled permanently in various parts of Uruguay, some returning after being repatriated to Germany. Rows of simple crosses in the Cementerio del Norte, in the north of the city of Montevideo, mark the burial places of the German dead. Three sailors killed aboard Achilles were buried in the British Cemetery in Montevideo, while those who died on Exeter were buried at sea. In March 1940 British residents of Montevideo sent £600 to Britain for the purchase of an ambulance to be dedicated to the memory of British sailors who lost their lives in the battle.

=== Intelligence gathering and salvage ===
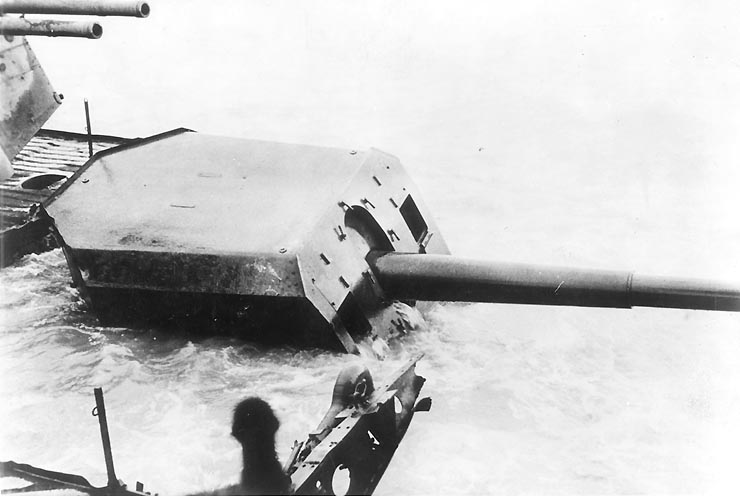
Admiral Graf Spee's Number Four 15.0 cm/55 gun mount (second gun in the forward port side group). Twin gun barrels at upper left are those of the ship's Number Two 10.5 cm/65 anti-aircraft gun mount

Immediately after her scuttling, the wreck of Admiral Graf Spee rested in shallow water, with much of the ship's superstructure remaining above water level, but over the years, the wreck has subsided into the muddy bottom, and only the tip of the mast remains above the surface.

A radar expert was sent to Montevideo shortly after the scuttling and reported a rotating aerial, probably for gunlaying, transmitting on either 57 or 114 centimetres. In February 1940, the wreck was boarded by United States Navy sailors from the light cruiser USS Helena.

Pieces and parts of the ship have also been displayed in museums and studied by scientists who have carried out tests like metallurgical analyses of the Graf Spee.

In 1964, on the 25 anniversary of the battle, a memorial to the ship was erected in Montevideo's port. Part of it is Admiral Graf Spee's anchor.

In 1997, one of Admiral Graf Spee's 150 mm (5.9 in) secondary gun mounts was raised and restored; it can now be seen outside Montevideo's National Maritime Museum.

In February 2004, a salvage team began work raising the wreck. The operation is being funded in part by the government of Uruguay, in part by the private sector, as the wreck is now a hazard to navigation. The first major section, the 27 long tons (27 t) heavy gunnery control station, was raised on 25 February 2004. It is expected to take several years to raise the entire wreck. James Cameron filmed the salvage operation. After she has been raised, it is planned that the ship might be restored and put on display at the National Marine Museum.

Many German veterans did not approve of the restoration attempt, as they considered the wreck to be a war grave and an underwater historical monument that should be respected. One of them, Hans Eupel, a former specialist torpedo mechanic, 87 years old in 2005, said that "this is madness, too expensive and senseless. It is also dangerous, as one of the three explosive charges we placed did not explode".

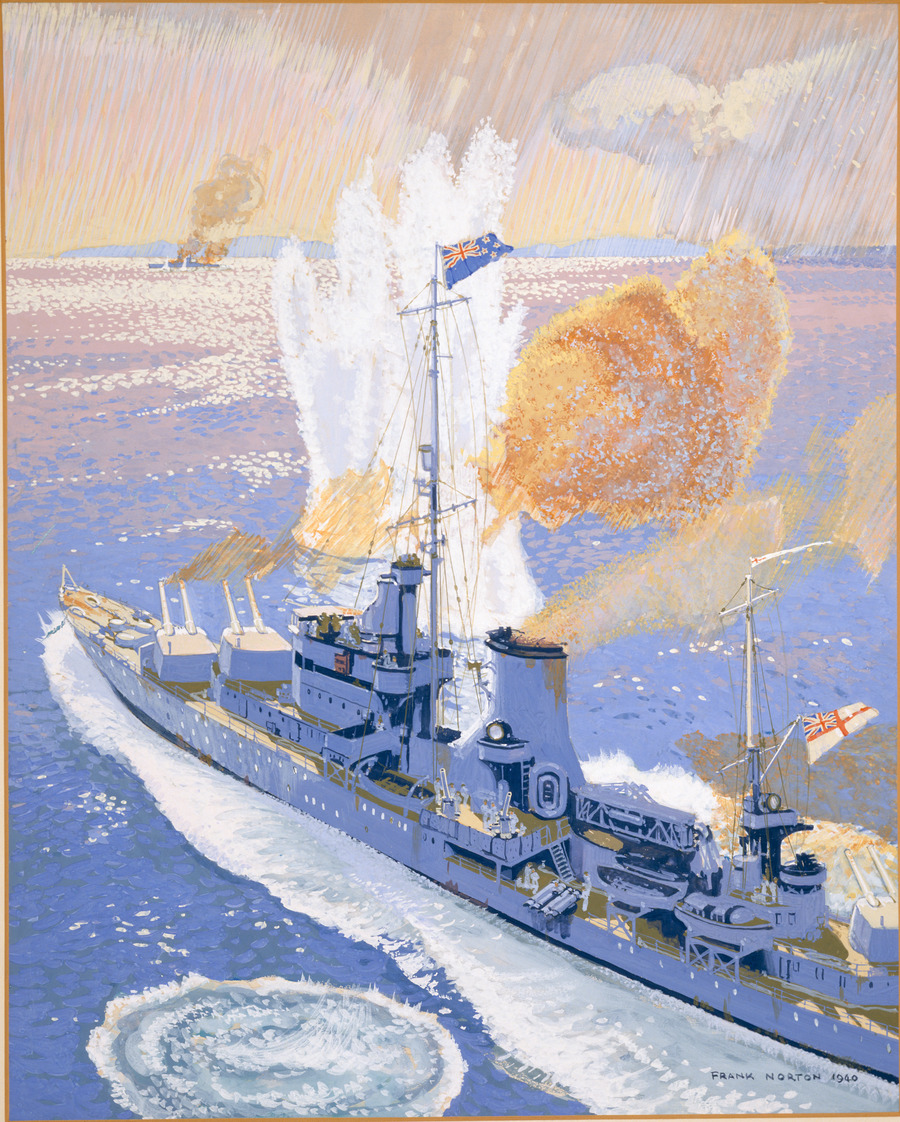
HMS Achilles; this painting by Frank Norton is part of the National Collection of War Art held by Archives New Zealand

On 10 February 2006, the 2 m (6 ft 7 in), 400 kg eagle and swastika crest of Admiral Graf Spee was recovered from the stern of the ship. The spread-wing statue of a Nazi eagle with a wreath in its talons containing a swastika was attached to the stern, not the bow like traditional figureheads. It was a common feature of prewar German warships. In other cases, it was removed for a variety of practical reasons on the outbreak of the war, but because Admiral Graf Spee was already at sea when the war began, she went into action and was scuttled with it attached, which permitted its recovery. To protect the feelings of those with painful memories of Nazi Germany, the swastika at the base of the figurehead was covered as it was pulled from the water. The figurehead was stored in a Uruguayan naval warehouse after German complaints about exhibiting "Nazi paraphernalia".

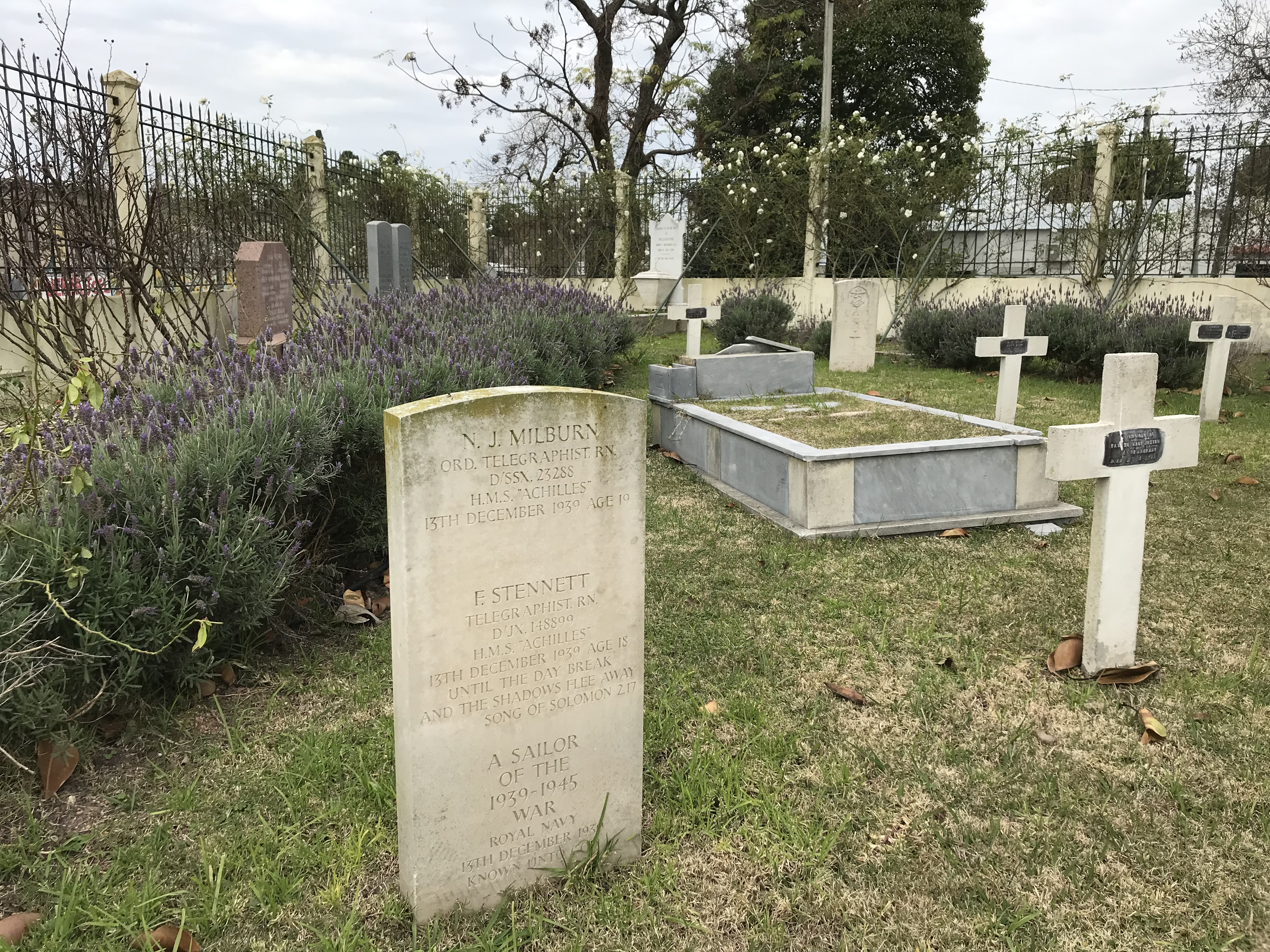
Graves of the sailors from HMS Achilles in The British Cemetery, Montevideo

== Legacy ==
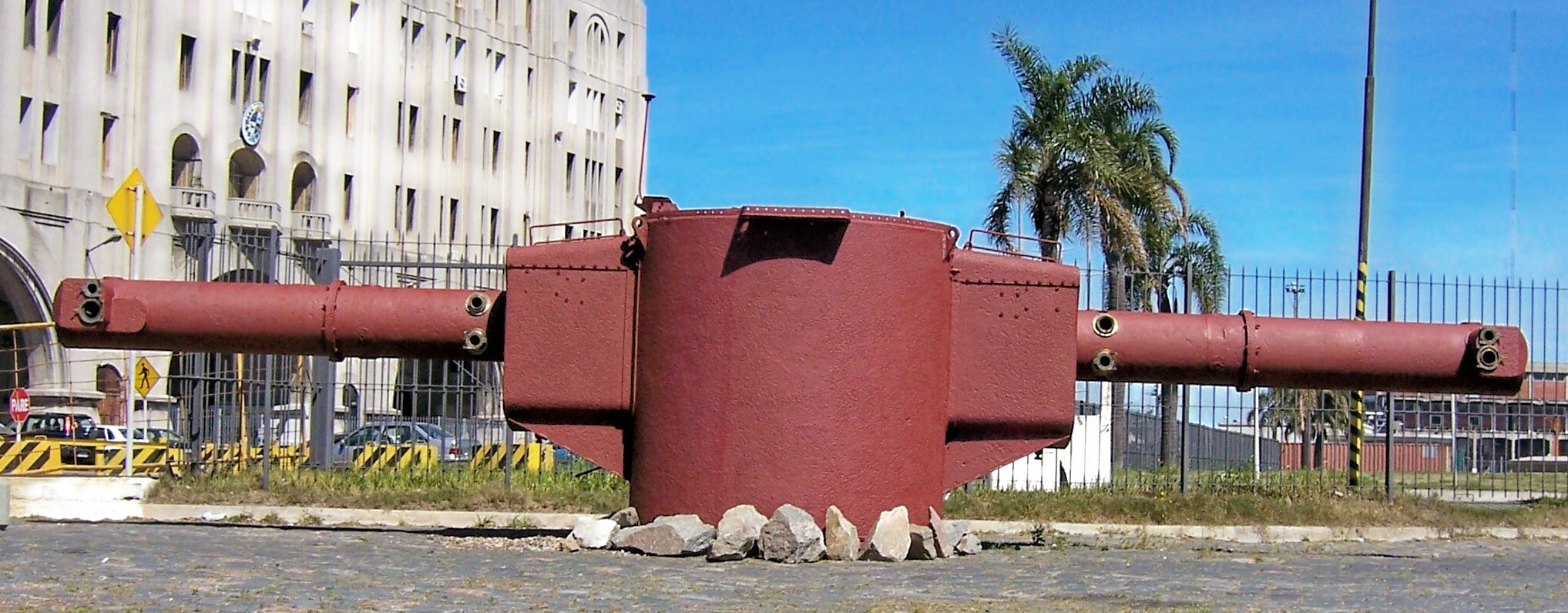
Admiral Graf Spee's salvaged rangefinder in Montevideo

In 1956, the film The Battle of the River Plate (US title: Pursuit of the Graf Spee) was made of the battle and Admiral Graf Spee's end, with Peter Finch as Langsdorff and Anthony Quayle as Harwood. Finch portrays Langsdorff sympathetically as a gentleman. The Achilles, which had been recommissioned in 1948 as HMIS Delhi, flagship of the Royal Indian Navy, played herself in the film. HMS Ajax (twin turrets) was "played" by HMS Sheffield (triple turrets), HMS Exeter (twin turrets) by HMS Jamaica (triple turrets) and HMS Cumberland by herself (although de-gunned as a trials platform). Admiral Graf Spee (two turrets) was portrayed by the U.S. heavy cruiser USS Salem (three turrets).

The incomplete Battle-class destroyer HMS River Plate was named after the battle.

The battle was for many years re-enacted with large-scale model boats throughout the summer season at Peasholm Park in the English seaside resort of Scarborough. The re-enactment now portrays an anonymous battle between a convoy of British ships and an unspecified enemy in possession of the nearby shore.

After the battle, the new town of Ajax, Ontario, in Canada, constructed as a Second World War munitions production centre, was named after HMS Ajax. Many of its streets are named after Admiral Harwood's crewmen on Ajax, Exeter and Achilles. Its main street is named after Admiral Harwood, while a small street was named (after some controversy) for Captain Langsdorff. According to an article in the German language paper Albertaner on 6 October 2007, Steve Parish, the mayor of Ajax, defended the decision, declaring that Langsdorff had not been a typical Nazi officer. An accompanying photograph (in the "Aftermath" section above) from the funeral of crew members shows Langsdorff paying tribute with a traditional naval salute, while people beside and behind him – even some clergymen – are giving the Fascist salute. The street name was changed in 2021 in response to public opposition.

Also in Canada, the names of the ships, and the commander of Force G, have been used for Cadet Corps. The Royal Canadian Sea Cadet Corps (RCSCC) Ajax No. 89 and the Navy League Cadet Corps (NLCC) Achilles No. 34 in Guelph, Ontario; the Navy League Wrenette Corps (NLWC) Lady Exeter (now disbanded) and the camp shared by all three corps, called Camp Cumberland (this camp no longer exists; it was decommissioned around 1999). RCSCC Harwood No. 244 and NLCC Exeter No. 173 are situated in Ajax, Ontario.

A number of streets in Nelson Bay, New South Wales, have been named after the battle including Montevideo Parade, Achilles Street, Ajax Avenue, Harwood Avenue, and Exeter Road (now called Shoal Bay Road). In Auckland, home port of the Royal New Zealand Navy, streets have been named for Achilles, Ajax and Exeter. Three streets in North Wollongong, New South Wales, are named Ajax Avenue, Exeter Avenue and Achilles Avenue.

The battle is also significant as it was the first time the Flag of New Zealand was flown in battle, from HMS Achilles. Also in New Zealand, four mountain peaks in the Two Thumb Range region of the South Island are named in commemoration of the battle. These are Achilles (2,544 m), Exeter (2,327 m), Ajax (2,319 m) and Graf Spee (2,267 m).

== Bibliography ==
- Arthur, Max (2012). Lost Voices of The Royal Navy (4th ed.). London: Hodder and Stoughton (Hachette UK). ISBN 978-1-84894-830-3 – via Google Books.
- Arthur, Max (2004). Forgotten Voices of the Second World War. London: Random House. ISBN 978-0-09-189734-5.
- Maier, Klaus; Rohde, Horst; Stegemann, Bernd; Umbreit, Hans (1991). Germany and the Second World War: Germany's initial conquests in Europe. Oxford: Clarendon. ISBN 978-0-19-822885-1.
- Millington-Drake, Eugen; et al. (Foreword by admiral of the fleet Earl Mountbatten of Burma and preface by admiral of the fleet Sir Philip Vian) (1965). Davies, Peter (ed.). The Drama of Graf Spee and the Battle of the Plate: A Documentary Anthology, 1914–1964 (2nd ed.). London: Peter Davies Ltd. ASIN B000QSV7M6.
- Pope, Dudley (1999) [1956]. The Battle of the River Plate. London: Chatham Publishing. ISBN 978-1-86176-089-0.
- Konstam, Angus; et al. (Illustrations by Tony Bryan) (2016). Cowper, Marcus (ed.). River Plate 1939: The sinking of the Graf Spee (2nd ed.). Oxford, UK: Osprey Publishing (Bloomsbury Publishing). ISBN 978-1472817969 – via Google Books.
- Grove, Eric; et al. (Foreword by Admiral Sir Nigel Essenhigh, First Sea Lord) (31 March 2015) [2002]. Grove, Eric; Moran, Mike (eds.). German Capital Ships and Raiders in World War II: From Graf Spee to Bismarck, 1931–1941. Naval Staff Histories. Vol. 1 (4th ed.). Abingdon-on-Thames, UK: Routledge (Taylor & Francis). ISBN 978-1-138-87363-6. ISSN 1471-0757 – via Google Books.
- Dick, Enrique (2014). Brebbia, Alexander Carlos (ed.). In the Wake of the Graf Spee. Translated by Marilyn Myerscough (2nd ed.). Ashurst, UK: WIT Press (Wessex Institute of Technology). ISBN 978-1-84564-932-6 – via Google Books.
- Landsborough, Gordon (2016) [1956]. The Battle of the River Plate: The First Naval Battle of the Second World War (5th ed.). Barnsley, UK: Frontline Books. ISBN 978-1-4738-7897-6 – via Google Books.
