= Trichrug =

Hill (415m) in Carmarthenshire, Wales

Coordinates: 51°53′N 3°53′W

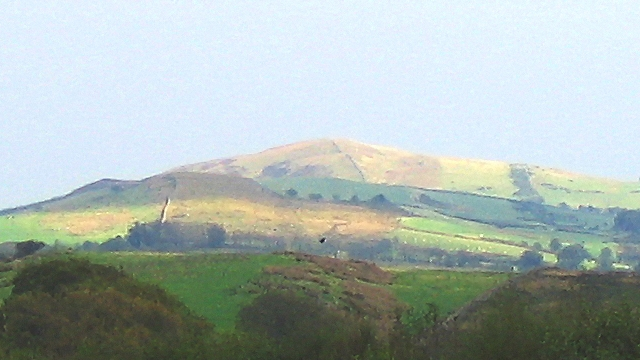
Trichrug

Trichrug (also referred to as Pen-y-bicws) is a hill four miles east of Llandeilo and 3 miles south of Llangadog in the county of Carmarthenshire, southwest Wales. It lies within the Brecon Beacons National Park and Fforest Fawr Geopark. Its summit at a height of 415m above sea level is marked by a trig point. It is a Marilyn with a prominence of 191 metres.

== Geology ==
The hill is formed from a suite of rocks of mid-Silurian age which are tilted steeply towards the southeast forming a part of the Myddfai Steep Belt. The summit and the crest of the ridge extending southwest and northeast is formed from the Trichrug Sandstone. Its northwestern slopes are largely formed in the mudstones and sandstones of the Hafod Fawr Formation whilst its southeastern slopes are largely formed from the Raglan Mudstone Formation. These rocks are the uppermost (i.e., youngest) Silurian rocks of the area, but are also considered to be the lowermost (i.e., oldest) beds of the Old Red Sandstone succession.

== Access ==
There is no public access to the summit, though a public footpath contours the hill at half-height on its northwestern side, and an unmetalled public road passes through the col known as Bwlch y Gors immediately to its west. The Beacons Way descends this track northwards towards Y Garn Goch en route for Llangadog.
