= Richard Jennings (economist) =

Richard Jennings (1814-1891) was a British economist. His economic thought has been characterised as 'proto-Marginalist'.

== Life ==
Richard Jennings was born on 9 July 1814, the elder son of Richard Jennings of Gellydeg, Carmathenshire and Portland Place, London. He was educated at Eton College and Trinity College, Cambridge, where he matriculated in 1832 and gained his BA in 1837. Concurrently with his Cambridge degree Jennings studied law in London: he was admitted to Lincoln's Inn in 1832 and called to the bar in 1838.

In 1844 Jennings married Agnes Catherine Annabella Hamilton, the only surviving daughter of Sir Edward Hamilton, 1st Baronet. He was a Justice of the Peace in Middlesex and Carmarthenshire. In 1859 he was High Sheriff of Carmarthenshire.

Jennings died on 8 December 1891.

== Economic writing ==
Jennings' Natural Elements of Political Economy (1855), which integrated physiological psychology with political economy, was an important influence on William Stanley Jevons. Calling Jennings "the writer who appears to me to have most clearly appreciated the nature and importance of the law of utility", Jevons followed Jennnings in basing a law of diminishing marginal utility on the psychological tendency for responses to decrease as physiological stimuli were repeated.

== Works ==
- Natural Elements of Political Economy. 1855.
- Social Delusions concerning Wealth and Want. 1856.
