= Richard Jennings (Royal Navy officer) =

Royal Navy officer

Richard Borthwick Jennings
- Born: 11 February 1903; Gillingham, Kent
- Died: 16 August 2001 (aged 98)
- Military career
- Branch: Royal Navy
- Conflicts: World War II: Battle of the River Plate
- Awards: Order of Merit (Chile); Distinguished Service Cross (United Kingdom); Distinguished Service Order

Richard Borthwick Jennings (11 February 1903 – 16 August 2001) was a Royal Navy Officer. Serving in the Second World War, he would be awarded a Distinguished Service Cross & Bar and Distinguished Service Order.

== Life and career ==
Leonard Jennings was born in Gillingham, Kent, the son of an army doctor, in 1903. He joined the cadets at age 13 and was in service as a midshipman aboard the HMS Ajax off the Turkish coast during the overthrow of the last Ottoman Sultan. Jennings completed the Long Gunnery Course in 1929 and would serve on the HMS Repulse and later the HMS Exeter in 1936. Stationed in the South Atlantic, Jennings was awarded the Chilean Order of Merit due to his participation in earthquake relief.

At the outbreak of the Second World War, while aboard the Exeter, Jennings would be involved in the Battle of the River Plate. The battle was one of the opening naval actions of the war, and considered the first significant victory for the Royal Navy. As a gunnery officer, Jennings was one of two recipients of the Distinguished Service Cross (DSC) aboard the Exeter. The ship sustained significant damage and casualties during the battle, with Jennings taking control of the tower and ordering the firing of the last remaining guns. With Jennings himself facing hearing damage he was recalled to Britain, escaping the sinking of the Exeter two years later at the Second Battle of the Java Sea.

Jennings further served as a Commander in the Mediterranean Fleet, seeing action against the Italian Navy, receiving his bar in 1941. By September 1942, Jennings had returned to Britain to lead a group of minesweepers in the English Channel, receiving a Distinguished Service Order (DSO) in 1943 for such work. Jennings served as an acting captain for a minesweeping operation in preparation for the Normandy Landings.

Following the war, Jennings would marry Joan Cave in 1947 by which he would have a son and daughter. His service would involve stations on the cruiser Hms Birmingham as Executive Officer, the HMS Rooke shore establishment in Gibraltar and preparing the aircraft carrier HMS Venerable for sale to the Dutch Navy. He retired from naval service in 1954, and two years later worked as advisor to the film, The Battle of the River Plate, although omitting his own role.
