= Sir John Williams, 1st Baronet, of the City of London =

Welsh baronet, physician and principal founder of the National Library of Wales

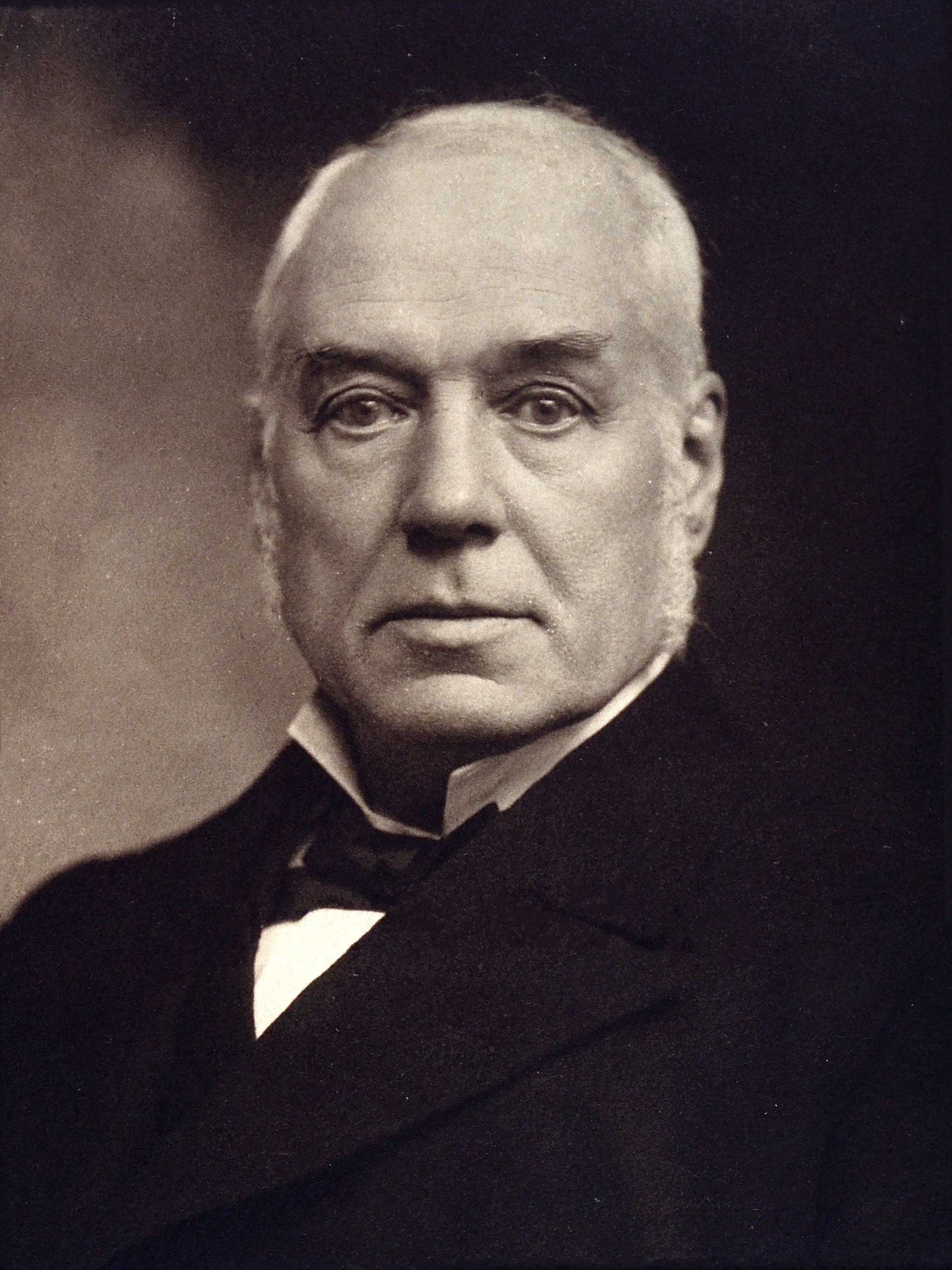
Sir John Williams

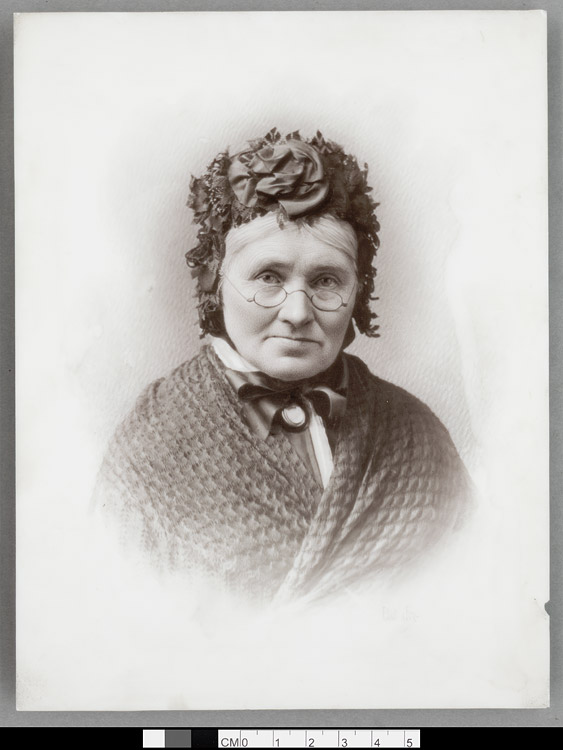
Eleanor Williams, mother of Sir John Williams, c.1890

Sir John Williams, 1st Baronet GCVO (6 November 1840 – 24 May 1926), was a Welsh physician, who attended Queen Victoria and was raised to the baronetcy by her on 30 October 1894. He is remembered chiefly for his contribution to the collection of the National Library of Wales. He resided for part of his life at Plas Llanstephan, Carmarthenshire, a house he acquired by lease.

== Education and medical career ==
John Williams was born in Gwynfe hamlet, Carmarthenshire, the son of David Williams (1802–1842), a Welsh Congregational minister, and his wife, Eleanor. He had four siblings. His father's elder brother, Morgan Williams (1800–1892) had 11 children, John's first cousins. Williams went to school in Swansea, then to the University of Glasgow, and finally to University College Hospital, London, to complete his medical studies: among other disbursements on his death he bequeathed £2,000 to the University College Hospital, London. In 1886 he became a private doctor to the royal family. As well as his career as an obstetric surgeon in London, he helped set up a Welsh hospital in South Africa during the Boer War, and was involved in the campaign against tuberculosis in his native country.

Williams was invested as a Knight Commander of the Royal Victorian Order (KCVO) during a visit to King Edward VII at Sandringham House on 29 December 1902, and was later promoted to a Knight Grand Cross (GCVO) of the order.

== Bibliographical interests ==
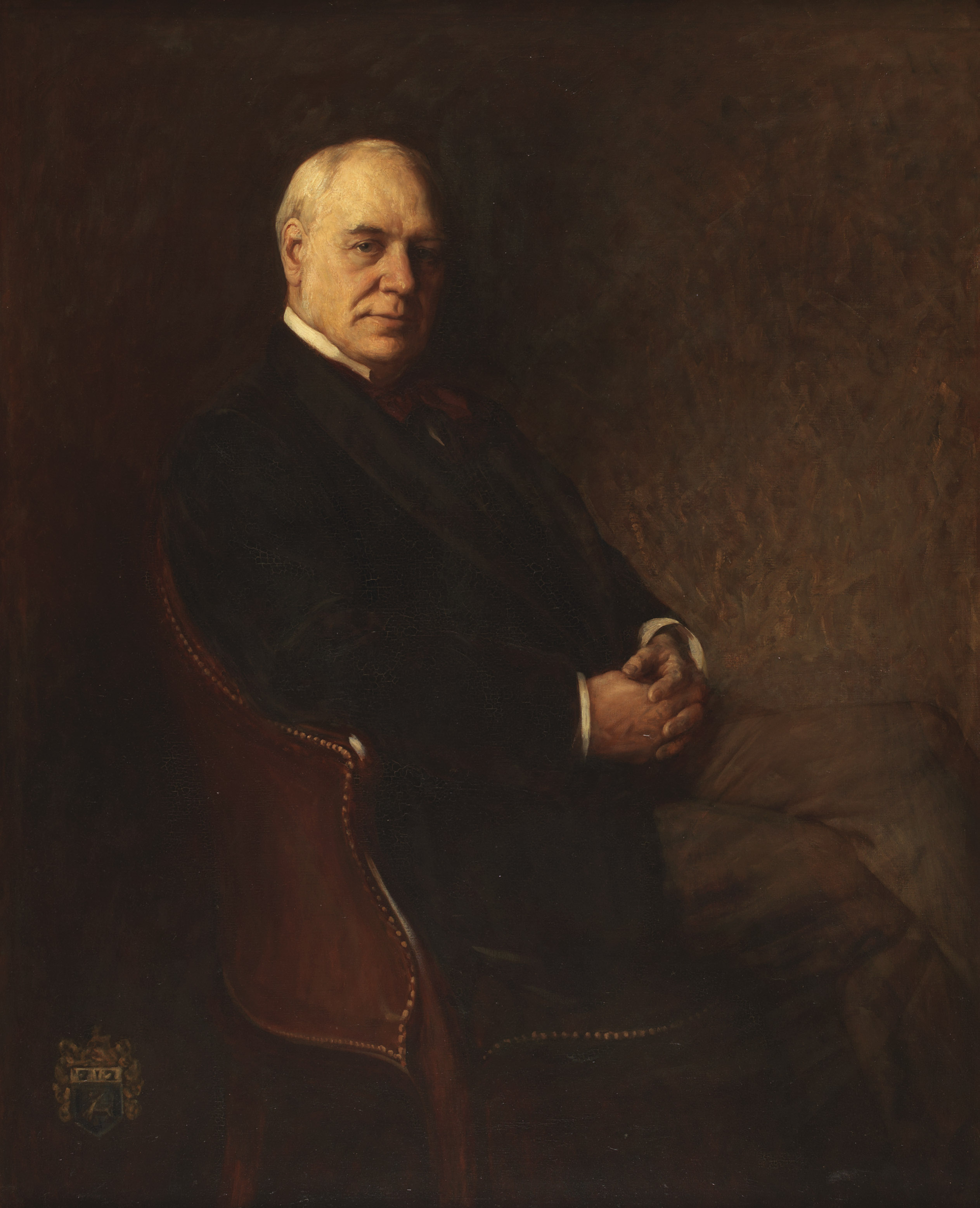
Sir John Williams by Christopher Williams

Sir John's leisure hours were largely spent in the acquisition of a large private library, and in 1898, influenced by the palaeographer John Gwenogvryn Evans, he acquired the Hengwrt–Peniarth collection of manuscripts. These were donated to the new National Library of Wales when it was built at Aberystwyth. In 1907 he was appointed the first President of the National Library, and two years later moved to Aberystwyth to live. In 1913 he became President of the University College of Wales, Aberystwyth (now Aberystwyth University). On his death, he bequeathed the remainder of his books, plus a large sum of money, in trust to the National Library, and the other moiety of the residuary estate in trust to the University College of Wales.

Sir John presented a collection of some 1,200 manuscripts in total to the National Library, which divide into three groups: the 500 manuscripts from the Hengwrt–Peniarth collection; the Llanstephan collection of 200 manuscripts, including 154 from the Shirburn Castle library; and 500 Additional Manuscripts that he had collected from various sources. The majority of the manuscripts were acquired between 1894 and 1905 as part of the campaign to establish the National Library in Aberystwyth. In 1905, after it had been confirmed that Aberystwyth would be the Library's location, he almost entirely ceased to collect manuscripts.

Over 25,000 printed volumes were either donated to the National Library by Sir John in his lifetime or bequeathed on his death. The 193 books and pamphlets that he purchased from Shirburn Castle are considered the most valuable group in the collection as they include important examples of the earliest Welsh printed literature. Another important part of the collection comprises editions of Arthurian romance, including a single incunabulum, Lancelot du Lac (1488), and a copy of all the Kelmscott Press publications. There is much Welsh interest material, including significant items that Sir John acquired individually, collections that he bought intact, such as the 4,558 volume library of John Parry of Llanarmon-yn-Iâl, and portions of libraries, such as those of Reverend John Jenkins of Kerry and Reverend Robert Williams of Rhydycroesau. There is therefore some duplication of early Welsh books, and the collection is often rich in variants of the same edition.

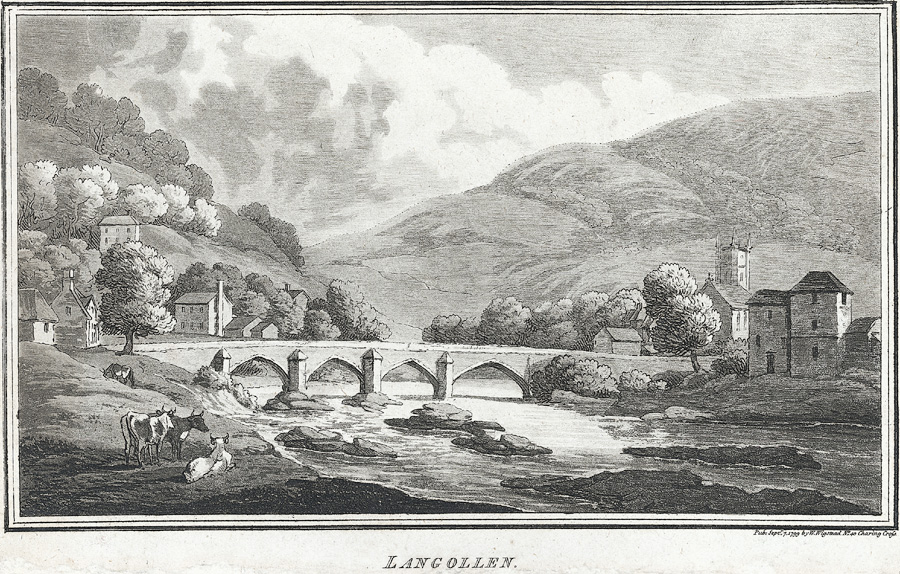
"Langollen" by Thomas Rowlandson, 1799

Sir John also collected pictorial records of Welsh life and culture, via his network of contacts in the art trade, which provided a solid foundation for the National Library's collections of maps and art. This includes a set of S. H. Grimm's prints and drawings of Wales, plates of Samuel and Nathaniel Buck's views of Wales, drawings by Sir Edwin Landseer, aquatints by Paul Sandby, and Thomas Rowlandson's drawings of his 1796 tour of Wales. There are also pictures attributed to masters such as Van Dyck, Gainsborough and Turner.

== Personal life ==
Williams married Mary Hughes in 1872. There were no children of the marriage.

== Jack the Ripper accusation ==
Sir John was accused of the Ripper crimes in a 2005 book, Uncle Jack, written by one of his distant relatives, Tony (Michael Anthony) Williams, and co-authored by Humphrey Price. The authors assert that the victims knew the doctor personally, and that they were killed and mutilated in an attempt to research the causes of infertility. The book also asserts that a badly blunted surgical knife, which belonged to Sir John, was the murder weapon. Serious doubts were raised by others about the authors' competence and motivation.

== Arms ==
Coat of arms of Williams of Plas Llanstephan
Crest A stag as in the arms, resting the dexter foot on a serpent nowed Proper. Escutcheon Azure, a stag trippant Argent, attired Or, between the attires a rose of the Second, on a chief of the Last a torch erect Proper between two eagles’ heads erased of the First. Motto Bydd gyfiawn ac nac ofna

Academic offices
Preceded by The Lord Rendel	President of the University College of Wales Aberystwyth; 1913–1926	Succeeded by The Lord Edmund-Davies
Baronetage of the United Kingdom
New creation	Baronet (of the City of London); 1894–1926	Extinct
Preceded by Tyler baronets	Williams baronets of the City of London; 30 October 1894	Succeeded by Barran baronets
