= Burry Port Lifeboat Station =

RNLI Lifeboat station in Carmarthenshire, Wales

- Gorsaf Bad Achub Porth Tywyn

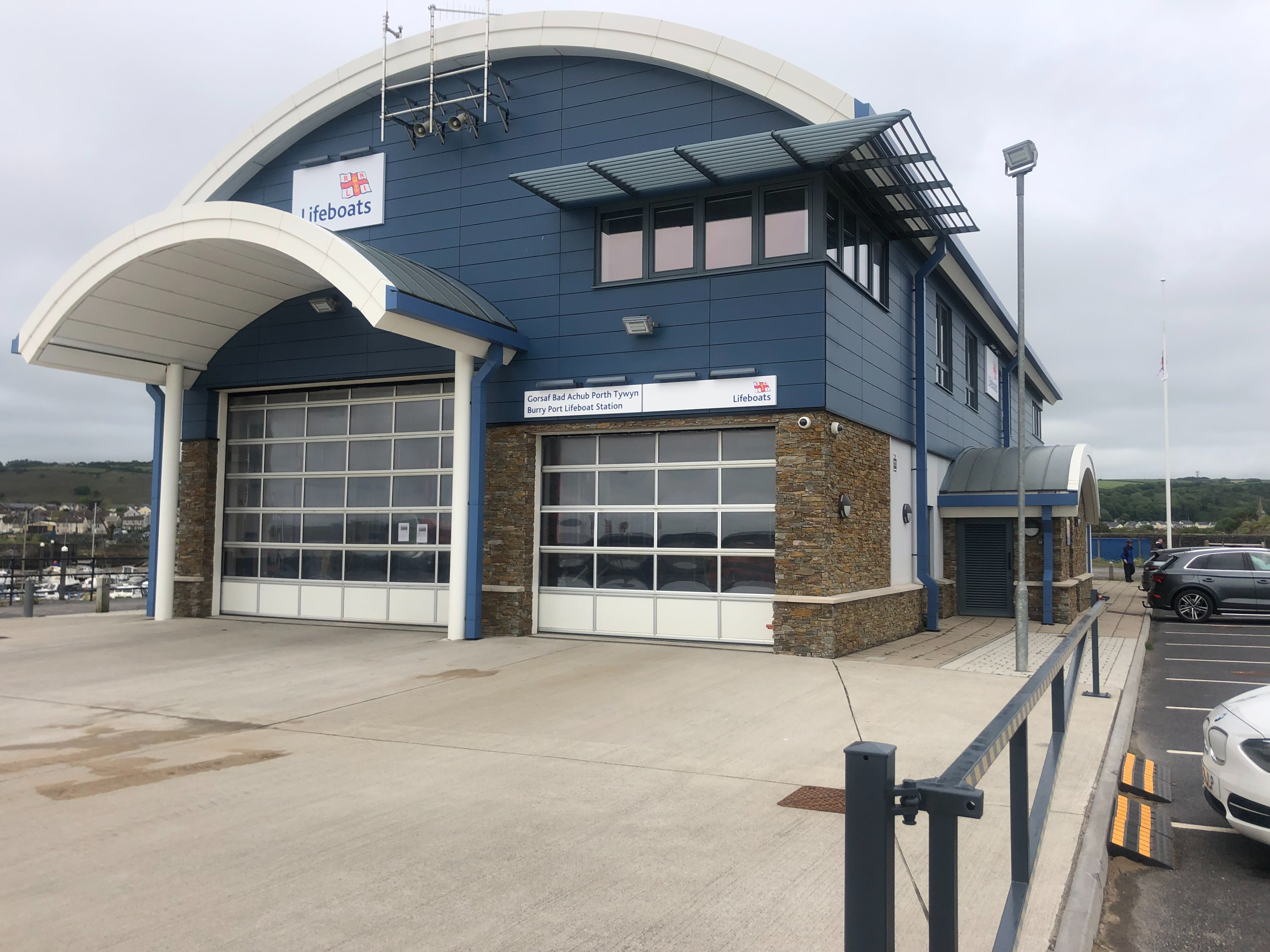
- Burry Port Lifeboat Station in 2022

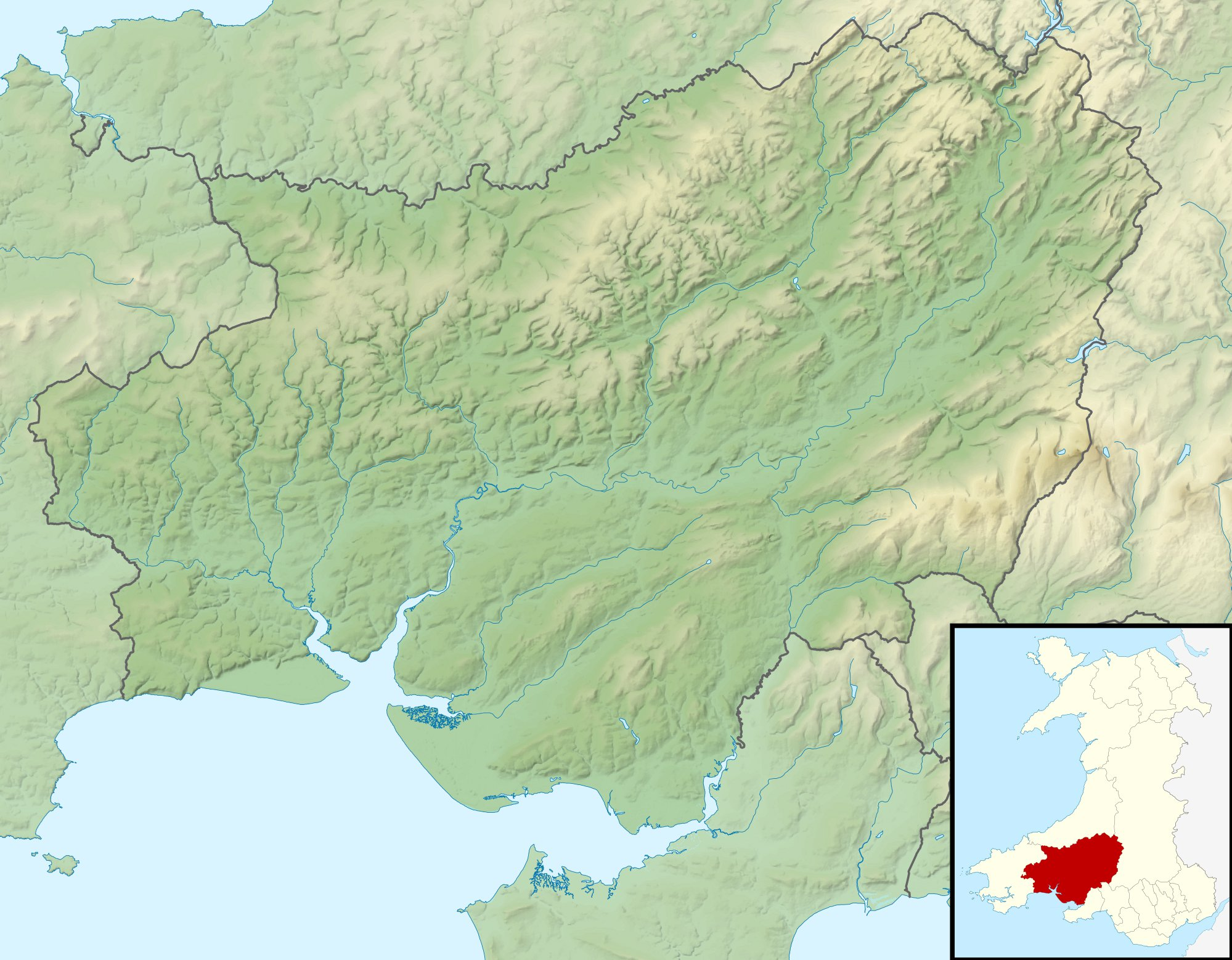
- Location within Carmarthenshire

General information
- Type: RNLI Lifeboat Station
- Location: The Harbour, Burry Port, Carmarthenshire, Wales, SA16 0ER, UK
- Coordinates: 51.67926°N 4.24858°W
- Opened: 1887, 1973
- Owner: Royal National Lifeboat Institution

Website
- Burry Port RNLI Lifeboat Station

Burry Port Lifeboat Station (Welsh: Gorsaf Bad Achub Porth Tywyn) is located on the eastern side of Burry Port Harbour, overlooking the River Loughor and Burry Inlet, in the county of Carmarthenshire, on the South Wales coast.

A lifeboat was first placed at Llanelli in 1852 by The Shipwrecked Fishermen and Mariners' Royal Benevolent Society (SFMRBS). In November 1854, the lifeboats of the SFMRBS were transferred to the management of the RNLI, with the lifeboat being relocated to Pembrey Burrows in 1863. The station was relocated again in 1887, this time to Burry Port. In 1914, the lifeboat was withdrawn, and the station closed.

In 1973, the RNLI established an Inshore lifeboat station at Burry Port. The station currently operates a B-class (Atlantic 85) Inshore lifeboat, The Misses Barrie (B-915), on station since 2019, and a smaller D-class (IB1) Inshore lifeboat, Williams & Cole (D-882), on station since 2023.

== History ==
The Burry Inlet and River Loughor estuary was regularly the site of shipwrecks. Vessels often mistook the Welsh coast for the Cornish coast, and if not corrected, would find themselves funnelled into the inlet, and onto the local sandbars.

In early 1852, the SFMRBS trialled a 26-foot self-righting lifeboat named Rescue, built by James Beeching of Great Yarmouth, costing £112. The lifeboat would be stationed at Llanelli, hoisted on the davits of the Llanelli Lightship, which was moored off the harbour.

By 1854, the SFMRBS was involved in the management of eight lifeboat stations, Lytham, Rhyl, Portmadoc, Hornsea, Tenby, Teignmouth, Newhaven and Llanelli. Discussions were held between the SFMRBS and the RNLI, and an agreement was made, where the former would concentrate on the welfare of those rescued, whilst the latter would be involved in lifeboats, stations and rescues. Management of all eight stations was transferred to the RNLI on 7 December 1854.

In 1863, Pembrey Lifeboat Station was established, with a new lifeboat replacing the Llanelli boat. A 30-foot self-righting 'Pulling and Sailing' (P&S) lifeboat, one with sails and (6) oars, was constructed by Forrestt of Limehouse, at a cost of £203. On 27 November 1863, the lifeboat, along with its carriage and equipment, was transported to Pembrey free of charge by the Great Western Railway. A new boathouse was constructed on Pembrey Burrows, at a cost of £180. The cost of the new boat was raised from the residents of Bath, Somerset, primarily through the efforts of Mr F. Bedwell, and the life-boat was duly named City of Bath.

Disaster struck the Burry Inlet in January 1868. After delivering cargo to Llanelli and Burry Port, the weather and wind was such, that it was impossible for any vessels to leave the inlet. After a period of stormy weather, the weather cleared, and on 23 January, ships set out, eager to make up their schedules, many being towed out to the bar. However, with little wind, vessels were unable to make headway with a considerable groundswell after the storms, and at least 18 vessels were wrecked, most with the loss of all hands.

- See List of shipwrecks in January 1868.

Calls were made for an additional lifeboat to be placed at Llanelli once again, which was agreed at the meeting of the RNLI committee of management on 7 May 1868. It was decided once again, that the boat would be located hanging from the davits of the Pilot ship, and crewed by the Pilots when required. As the boat would be extraordinarily exposed to the elements, a specially constructed Iron lifeboat was ordered, from Hamilton's Windsor Iron Works Company (Limited), of Garston, Liverpool, manufacturers of the Severn Railway Bridge. In April 1869, the 26-foot lifeboat arrived in Llanelli, and was tested to much satisfaction. The lifeboat was funded by Miss Anne M. White of Plymouth, and named James and Elizabeth after her late parents.

In October 1871, a new larger lifeboat was placed at Penbrey. The 32-foot 10-oared lifeboat, costing £252, was funded from the legacy of a gentleman, Stanton Meyrick, of Pimlico, who wished a lifeboat to be placed on the Welsh coast. The Llanelli lifeboat was withdrawn.

== Move to Burry Port ==
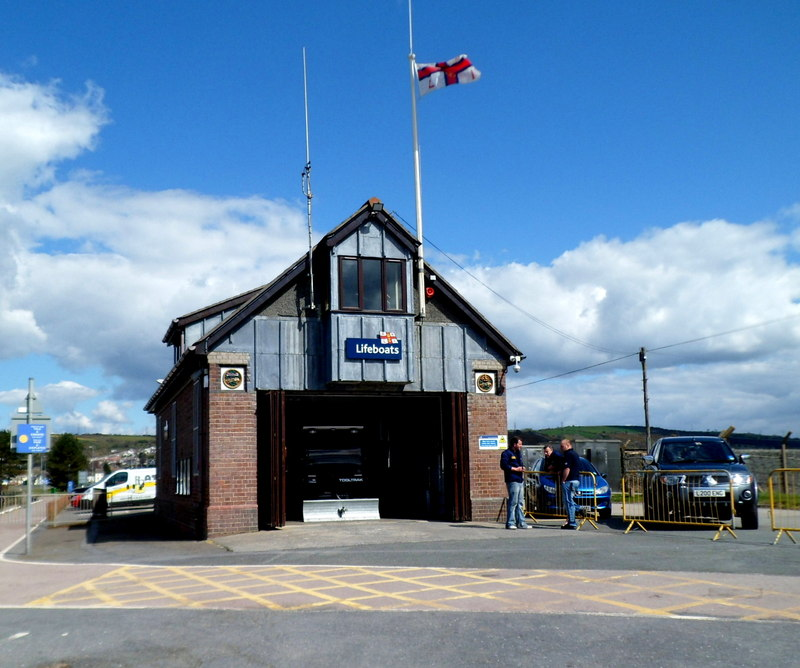
1887 boathouse, still in use in 2012

In 1887, operations at Pembrey ceased, due to the shifting and ever increasing amount of sand near the station. Burry Port Lifeboat Station was established at Burry Port. A new boathouse was constructed on the eastern side of Burry Port Harbour, at a cost of £240-15s-10d. The lifeboat at Pembrey was withdrawn from service, and a new 37-foot 12-oared lifeboat was sent to the station, along with a new transporting and launching carriage.

At a ceremony on 16 July 1887, the lifeboat was named David Barclay, of Tottenham (ON 110), after the costs of the station were defrayed from the bequest of £3500 from Mrs J. S. Barclay, in memory of her late husband.

The legacy was sufficient to provide funding for three lifeboats placed at Burry Port, all named or renamed David Barclay of Tottenham. During their time on service, the three boats were credited with saving 34 lives.

At a meeting of the RNLI committee of management on 2 April 1914, it was decided that there was ample coverage for the estuary from flanking stations, and Burry Port Lifeboat Station was closed. The lifeboat on service at the time of closure, David Barclay of Tottenham (ON 296), was sold from service.

== Inshore lifeboat station ==
In 1973, due to an increase in drowning incidents in Carmarthen Bay, the RNLI decided to reopen the station, and allocated a D-class lifeboat, (D-220). The lifeboat was funded by monies raised by the Tiverton Swimming Club, through a national sponsored swim.

In 2010, a temporary boathouse was constructed, in order to house a B-class (Atlantic 75), which had been allocated to the station. Previously stationed at Beaumaris, the lifeboat had been funded from an appeal on a BBC children's TV programme, and was named Blue Peter II (B-768).

In 2017, plans were drawn up for a completely new boathouse. It would also offer better crew facilities, increased capacity for school and group visits, a visitor experience with a shop and would be easier to manage. It would also be large enough to house both a new B-class (Atlantic 85), a larger and more capable boat than the existing Atlantic 75, along with the D-class lifeboat.

At a ceremony on Saturday 19 September 2019, the new facility was officially declared open, and the new Atlantic 85 was named The Misses Barrie (B-915). The new building was designed by Llanelli Architects, Lewis Partnership Ltd, and built by contractors Andrew Scott Ltd.

== Llanelli lifeboats ==
ON (Note: ON is the RNLI's Official Number of the boat.)	Name	Built	On station	Class	Comments
Pre-243	Rescue	1852	1852–1863	26-foot Beeching self-righting (P&S)	(Note: 26 ft 0 in (7.92 m) x 6 ft 4 in (1.93 m) (8-oared) Beeching self-righting (P&S) lifeboat, funded by the SFMRBS, built by James Beeching of Great Yarmouth, costing £112.); Broken up in 1864.
Pre-533	James and Elizabeth	1869	1869–1871	26-foot 6in Iron self-righting (P&S)	(Note: 26 ft 6 in (8.08 m) x 6 ft 1 in (1.85 m) (5-oared) Iron self-righting (P&S) lifeboat, gift of Miss A. M. White of Plymouth, built by Hamilton's Windsor Iron Works Company (Limited), of Garston, Liverpool, costing £200.); Sold in 1871

Pre ON numbers are unofficial numbers used by the Lifeboat Enthusiasts' Society to reference early lifeboats not included on the official RNLI list.

== Pembrey lifeboats ==
ON	Name	Built	On station	Class	Comments
Pre-408	City of Bath	1863	1863–1871	30-foot Peake self-righting (P&S)	(Note: 30 ft 0 in (9.14 m) x 7 ft 0 in (2.13 m) (6-oared) Peake-class self-righting (P&S) lifeboat, funded by the City of Bath LB fund, built by Forrestt of Limehouse, London, costing £204.); Transferred to The Lizard
Pre-559	Stanton Meyrick of Pimlico	1871	1871–1887	32-foot Prowse self-righting (P&S)	(Note: 32 ft 0 in (9.75 m) x 7 ft 6 in (2.29 m) (10-oared) Prowse-class self-righting (P&S) lifeboat, legacy of Mr S. Meyrick of Pimlico, built by Woolfe of Shadwell, London, costing £252.); Broken up in 1887.

== Burry Port lifeboats ==
=== Pulling and Sailing (P&S) lifeboats ===
ON	Name	Built	On station	Class	Comments
110	David Barclay of Tottenham	1887	1887–1897	37-foot self-righting (P&S)	(Note: 37 ft 0 in (11.28 m) x 8 ft 0 in (2.44 m) (12-oared) self-righting (P&S) lifeboat, legacy of Mrs J. S. Barclay of Edmonton, built by Forrestt of Limehouse, London, costing £454.); Broken up in 1898.
262	David Barclay of Tottenham	1890	1897–1903	37-foot Self-righting (P&S)	(Note: 37 ft 0 in (11.28 m) x 8 ft 0 in (2.44 m) (12-oared) self-righting (P&S) lifeboat, legacy of Mrs J.S. Barclay of Edmonton, built by Forrestt of Limehouse, London, costing £569.); Previously Robert Fitzstephens at Carnsore. Transferred to Courtown.
296	David Barclay of Tottenham	1890	1903–1914	37-foot Self-righting (P&S)	(Note: 37 ft 0 in (11.28 m) x 8 ft 0 in (2.44 m) (12-oared) self-righting (P&S) lifeboat, legacy of Mrs J.S. Barclay of Edmonton, built by Watkins of Blackwall, London.); Previously William Erle at Swanage. Condemned and sold in 1914.

Station Closed in 1914

=== Inshore lifeboats ===
==== D class ====
Op.No. (Note: Op. No. is the RNLI's Operational Number of the boat carried on the hull or vehicle.)	Name	On station	Class	Comments
D-220	Tiverton Swimming Club	1973–1986	D-class (RFD PB16)	
D-331	Dorothy Way	1987–1994	D-class (EA16)	
D-472	Kip & Kath	1994–2003	D-class (EA16)	
D-611	The Young Watsons	2003–2011	D-class (EA16)	
D-749	Diane Hilary	2011–2023	D-class (IB1)	
D-882	Williams & Cole	2023–	D-class (IB1)	

==== B class ====
Op.No.	Name	On station	Class	Comments
B-768	Blue Peter II	2010–2011	B-class (Atlantic 75)	
B-731	Dorothy Selina	2011–2014	B-class (Atlantic 75)	
B-777	Leicester Challenge II	2014–2018	B-class (Atlantic 75)	
B-915	The Misses Barrie	2019–	B-class (Atlantic 85)	

=== Launch and recovery tractors ===
Op.No.	Reg. No.	Type	On station	Comments
TW44	S193 RUJ	Talus MB-764 County	2010–2018	
TW32	L161 LAW	Talus MB-764 County	2018–2020	
TW14	D659 TNT	Talus MB-764 County	2020–2022	
TW09	PEL 169W	Talus MB-764 County	2022–	

== See also ==
- List of RNLI stations
- List of former RNLI stations
- Royal National Lifeboat Institution lifeboats
- Talus Atlantic 85 DO-DO launch carriage
