= Burry Port Harbour =

Industrial port for coal industry

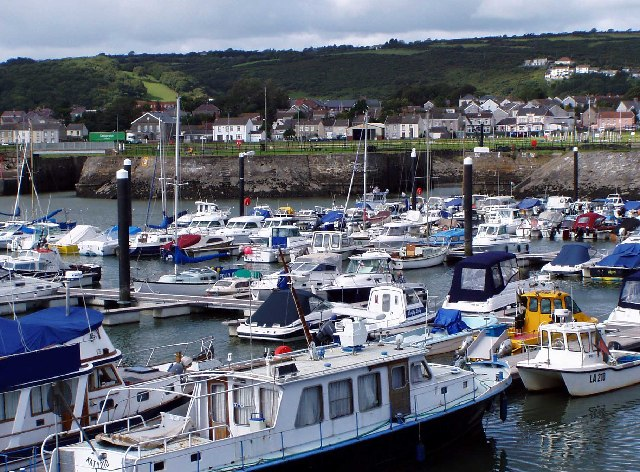
- North west facing view of the harbour
- Interactive map of Burry Port Harbour
- Location within Wales

Location
- Country: Wales
- Location: Burry Port
- Coordinates: 51.680924°N 4.253086°W
- UN/LOCODE: GB BPT

Details
- Opened: 1832
- Owned by: The Marine Group

Burry Port Harbour is a former industrial harbour which mainly served the coal industry, on the Loughor estuary (Moryd Llwchwr). It is now converted into a marina. The town of Burry Port grew around the harbour.

== Origins ==
New Pembrey Harbour Act 1825
- Act of Parliament
- Parliament of the United Kingdom
- Long title: An Act for making and constructing a Harbour and other Works, in the Parish of Pembrey, in the County of Carmarthen; and for making a Canal and Railway from the said Harbour to the Kidwelly and Llanelly Canal, in the said County.
- Citation: 6 Geo. 4. c. cxv

Dates
- Repealed: 25 August 2000
Other legislation
Repealed by	Burry Port Harbour Revision Order 2000

Status: Repealed

The town of Burry Port dates from the nineteenth century although the neighbouring village of Pembrey has a history dating back to the medieval period. From the late eighteenth century, the development of small collieries in the area led to the building of a network of canals and then tramways to carry coal from inland mines to the sea. The first of these canals was built by Thomas Kymer and reached the sea at Kidwelly and another was built in 1798 by the Earl of Ashburnham to serve his collieries. Harbour facilities remained basic until Pembrey Harbour was opened in 1819. However, the fairly rapid growth of coal mining in the years following the end of the Napoleonic Wars in 1815 resulted in it not being large enough to serve the needs of the mine owners of the Gwendraeth Valley. As a result, with the backing of the Pemberton family and other local landowners an act of Parliament, the New Pembrey Harbour Act 1825 (6 Geo. 4. c. cxv), was secured to form the Pembrey New Harbour Company. This became known as Burry Port Harbour before it was completed.

== Early history ==
The new harbour opened in 1832 although the harbour walls collapsed soon after leading to a delay in its full operation. It provided a means to transport coal produced in the Gwendraeth Valley out to sea, although it still depended on a complex pattern of inland canals and tramways. Those who invested in the development of the harbour believed that its location offered considerable potential for expansion, as it had an advantage over neighbouring Llanelli Harbour in that vessels did not need to navigate the narrow channel along the Loughor estuary. In June 1838, John H. Browne, clerk to the Burry Port Harbour Company, wrote to the Cambrian newspaper drawing attention to the advantages after an article on port facilities in the South Wales Coalfield failed to refer to Burry Port. Three years later, in 1841, an account of the potential development of the anthracite coalfield to provide fuel for steamships highlighted the potential of Burry Port Harbour to accommodate larger ships than could progress through the narrow channel to the larger port at Llanelli.

== Nineteenth-century developments ==
The town of Burry Port did not exist at this time. The earliest records of the town springing up around the new docks adjacent to Pembrey appear around 1850. The importance of the newly emerging town increased when the railways reached Burry Port. The station serving both Pembrey and the new town of Burry Port was built a few hundred yards down from Pembrey at Burry Port.

The canal network was now unable to handle the loads from the Gwendraeth valley mines and part of the canal network was converted into the Burry Port and Gwendraeth Valley Railway by the late 1860s with the port continuing to grow in importance and shipping volumes. It did not, however, achieve the levels of trade that many had anticipated and went into gradual decline in the twentieth century.

Burry Port Harbour Revision Order 2000
- Statutory Instrument
- Parliament of the United Kingdom
- Citation: SI 2000/2152

Dates
- Made: 4 August 2000
- Commencement: 25 August 2000
Other legislation
Made under	Harbours Act 1964

Text of statute as originally enacted
