= Kidwelly railway station =

Railway station in Carmarthenshire, Wales

Kidwelly Welsh: Cydweli
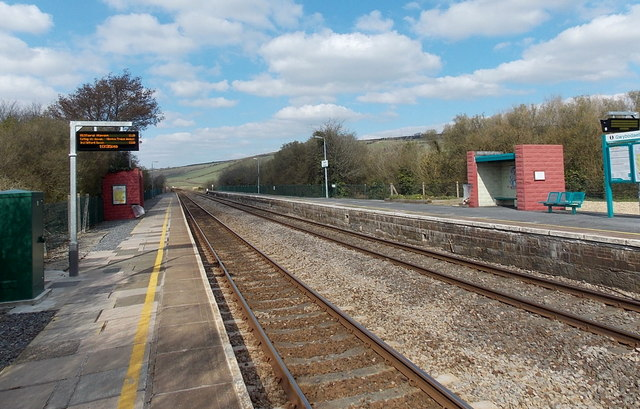

General information
- Location: Kidwelly, Carmarthenshire; Wales
- Coordinates: 51.734°N 4.317°W
- Grid reference: SN401064
- Manager: Transport for Wales
- Platforms: 2

Other information
- Station code: KWL
- Classification: DfT category F1

Passengers
- 2021/22: ▲15,544
- 2022/23: ▲20,972
- 2023/24: ▲26,874
- 2024/25: ▲34,566
- 2025/26: ▲36,222
Location
Notes
- Passenger statistics from the Office of Rail and Road

Kidwelly railway station serves the town of Kidwelly (Welsh: Cydweli), Carmarthenshire, Wales. The station is situated on the coast just southwest of Kidwelly itself. It is 234 miles 32 chains (377.2 km) from the zero point at London Paddington, measured via Stroud.

The station was opened by the South Wales Railway on 11 October 1852 and was once the junction for a branch of the Burry Port and Gwendraeth Valley Railway which ran via Ty Coch to Trimsaran Road. This connection, which lay just to the east of the level crossing, was re-used between 1984 and 1996 for coal traffic to/from the washery at Coedbach following the closure of the flood-prone BP&GVR main line to Burry Port in 1983.

== History ==
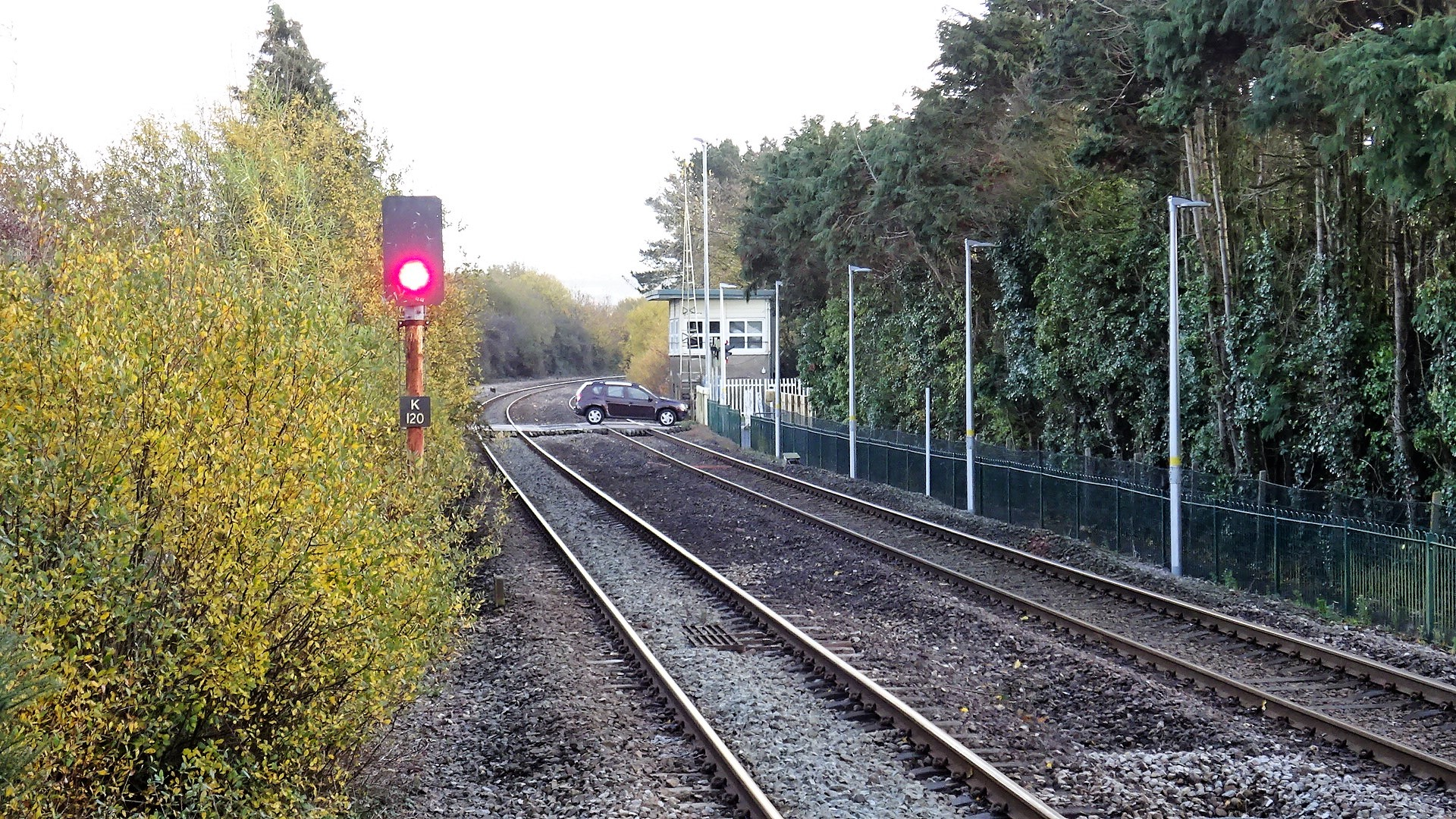
The level crossing and the lane to Kymer's Quay

The station was first opened as a temporary wooden platform however on 26 March 1852 Emery of Gloucester was awarded the contract and a stone-built station was constructed of a style repeated all along the line. These station buildings have been demolished and replaced with basic shelters. The station is now unstaffed.

On 20 June 1957 a Royal Air Force Hawker Hunter crashed 200 yards east of station with the death of the pilot.

At the east end of the station is a signal box with an adjacent level crossing where the road from Kidwelly to the old quay crosses the railway line. The west end of the station ends with a bridge over the river. A World War II pillbox remains intact just before the bridge.

== Services ==
There is a two-hourly service from the station for most of the day (Mon-Sat), improving to hourly during the morning and evening peak periods. Stops are provided by both the West Wales/Carmarthen to Manchester Piccadilly and Pembroke Dock to Swansea trains (peak periods and evenings only), though the daily Great Western Railway Carmarthen to London Paddington service also calls eastbound (except Saturdays). A similar service is provided on Sundays, but starting later in the day.

Preceding station	National Rail	Following station
Pembrey & Burry Port	Transport for Wales; West Wales Line	Ferryside
