= John Cadogan =

British organic chemist (1930–2020)

Sir John Cadogan CBE FRS FRSE FIC FRSC
- Born: John Ivan George Cadogan; 8 October 1930; Pembrey, Carmarthenshire, Wales, United Kingdom
- Died: 9 February 2020 (aged 89)
- Education: King's College London
- Occupations: Scientist, chemist

Sir John Ivan George Cadogan (8 October 1930 – 9 February 2020) was a British organic chemist and Director General of the Research Councils until 1998.

== Early life ==
Cadogan was born in Pembrey, Carmarthenshire, Wales, United Kingdom. He was educated at Swansea Grammar School, where he achieved State Scholar in 1948, and at King's College London, where he earned a 1st Class Honours degree as well as a PhD, and was awarded the Millar Thomson Medal, and the Samuel Smiles Prize.

== Interests ==
Cadogan was particularly interested in the popularisation of science. He calculated that he had given live lecture demonstrations to over 10,000 school children and many more via television. He took part in the first live satellite telecast from London to New Zealand, at which time he treasured the sight of more TV vans outside the Royal Institution than even outside the Arms Park for a Wales-England match. He was a Liveryman of the Salters' Company and a director of the Salters' Institute whose considerable charitable works are dedicated to the improvement of teaching of Chemistry and Chemical Engineering. He was a Freeman of the City of London.

== Positions and memberships ==
From 1979 to 2002, he was Visiting Professor of Chemistry at Imperial College, London, and from 1979 to 2007, he was an Honorary Professorial Fellow in Chemistry at the University of Wales, Swansea. He was a Science Policy Advisor to the Science Foundation, Ireland, from its inception until 2006.

== Honours ==
Cadogan was awarded Honorary Doctorates at the Universities of St Andrews, Edinburgh, Stirling, Aberdeen, Wales, Aix-Marseille, Cranfield, Durham, Glamorgan, Leicester, London, Nottingham, Nottingham Trent, Sunderland, and Wales and Honorary Fellowships from University of Swansea; University of Cardiff; King's College, London; Imperial College, London; and the Swansea Metropolitan University. He was also an Honorary Fellow of the Royal Academy of Engineering.

In 2013, Cadogan was awarded the Royal Medal of the Royal Society of Edinburgh by Prince Philip, the Duke of Edinburgh, for his "outstanding contribution to Organic Chemistry through his research, discovery and invention, and the impact for wider academia of his work with the UK Research Councils and industry."
