= List of shipwrecks in January 1868 =

The list of shipwrecks in January 1868 includes ships sunk, foundered, grounded, or otherwise lost during January 1868.

== 1 January ==
List of shipwrecks: 1 January 1868
Ship	State	Description
Fowey	United Kingdom	The schooner was driven ashore on the Isle of Ewe, Ross-shire and sank. Her crew were rescued. She was on a voyage from Ullapool to Stornoway, Isle of Lewis, Outer Hebrides.
Northern Belle	United Kingdom	The ship was abandoned in the Atlantic Ocean. Her crew were rescued by Great Western (United Kingdom). Northern Belle was on a voyage from Liverpool, Lancashire to Boston, Massachusetts, United States.
HMS Research	Royal Navy	The Camelion-class sloop ran aground on the wreck of the steamship City of New York (United Kingdom) near the Daunt Rock whilst in pursuit of the barque Alaska (United States). She was refloated and taken in to Queenstown, County Cork in a leaky condition.
Unnamed	Flag unknown	The steamship caught fire and sank off the Ross of Mull, United Kingdom.

== 2 January ==
List of shipwrecks: 2 January 1868
Ship	State	Description
Tynemouth	United Kingdom	The barque foundered in the Sea of Marmara. Her crew were rescued. She was on a voyage from Constantinople, Ottoman Empire to Trieste and South Shields, County Durham.
Union	United Kingdom	The ship was driven ashore on Skagen, Denmark. She was on a voyage from Struer, Denmark to Sandwich, Kent. She had become a wreck by 9 January.
Victoria	(United Kingdom of Great Britain and Ireland) New Zealand	The schooner was lost during a squall in Lake Wakatipu, with the loss of one of the three on board.
Unnamed	France	The ship was driven ashore at Breaksea Point, Glamorgan, United Kingdom.

== 3 January ==
List of shipwrecks: 3 January 1868
Ship	State	Description
Admiral Shoom	Flag unknown	The ship was lost at Mauritius.
Bury St. Edmunds	United Kingdom	The ship was driven ashore on Mauritius.
Hammersmith	United Kingdom	The barque was driven ashore and wrecked at Mauritius with the loss of three of her crew.
Incomparable	France	The full-rigged ship was driven ashore and wrecked on Mauritius.
Industry	United Kingdom	The ship was driven ashore and wrecked at Whitby, Yorkshire. Her crew were rescued by the Whitby Lifeboat.
Mulgrave	United Kingdom	The ship was driven ashore at Whitby. Her crew were rescued by the Whitby Lifeboat.
Panmure	United Kingdom	The barque ran aground on the Woolpack Sand, 5 nautical miles (9.3 km) off Hunstanton, Norfolk and was wrecked. Her twelve crew were rescued. She was on a voyage from Newcastle upon Tyne, Northumberland to Lisbon, Portugal.
Saul Frederick	Norway	The brig ran aground on the Haisborough Sands, in the North Sea off the coast of Norfolk, United Kingdom and sank with the loss of seven of her nine crew.
Star of Hope	United Kingdom	The ship collided with the steamship Grecian (United Kingdom) and sank off the Hook Lighthouse, County Wexford. Her crew were rescued.
Vigilant	United Kingdom	The ship was lost at Mauritius.
Warrior	United States	The steamship was driven ashore at Port-Louis, Mauritius.

== 4 January ==
List of shipwrecks: 4 January 1868
Ship	State	Description
Ada	United States	The brig was wrecked on Cape Sable Island, Nova Scotia, Canada. She was on a voyage from Portland, Maine to Halifax, Nova Scotia.
Annie	United Kingdom	The barque ran aground at Sandy Point. She was on a voyage from Boston, Massachusetts to Baltimore, Maryland, United States.
Gauntlet	United Kingdom	The schooner was abandoned in the Atlantic Ocean. All but two of her crew were rescued by the barque Annie Lisle (United Kingdom. Those left on board were rescued the next day by Progress (United Kingdom). Gauntlet was on a voyage from Tampico, Mexico to London.
Malta	United Kingdom	The ship departed from Cardiff, Glamorgan for Havana, Cuba. No further trace, presumed foundered with the loss of all hands.
Marie Amelie	United Kingdom	The ship was wrecked on Punta de Mulas, Cuba. She was on a voyage from Liverpool, Lancashire to Havana, Cuba.
Willie Ridley	United Kingdom	The brig was abandoned in the Atlantic Ocean. Her crew were rescued by Matilda (United Kingdom). Willie Ridley was on a voyage from Cardiff, Glamorgan to Cienfuegos, Cuba.

== 5 January ==
List of shipwrecks: 5 January 1868
Ship	State	Description
Carl Frederick	United Kingdom	The ship was wrecked on the Haisborough Sands, in the North Sea off the coast of Norfolk.
Cleadon	United Kingdom	The ship departed from The Downs for Aden. Although subsequently sighted in the Atlantic Ocean, she did not reach her destination. Presumed foundered with the loss of all hands.
Fidelia	United Kingdom	The ship foundered off Cape Mongoui, Saint Domingo. Her crew were rescued. She was on a voyage from Martinique to Pensacola, Florida, United States.
Margaret	United Kingdom	The ship was run into by Why Not (United Kingdom) and sank in the English Channel east of Start Point, Devon with the loss of three of her five crew. Survivors were rescued by Why Not. Margaret was on a voyage from Portmadoc, Caernarfonshire to London.
Unnamed	Flag unknown	The ship foundered in the Bay of Biscay. Her eight crew were rescued by the lugger Nautile (France).

== 6 January ==
List of shipwrecks: 6 January 1868
Ship	State	Description
Hammersmith	United Kingdom	The ship was wrecked at Black River, Mauritius with the loss of three of her crew.
Incomparable	United Kingdom	The ship was wrecked at Black River, Mauritius.

== 7 January ==
List of shipwrecks: 7 January 1868
Ship	State	Description
Albatros	United Kingdom	The ship was driven ashore on Imbros, Ottoman Empire. She was on a voyage from Enos, Ottoman Empire to a British port. She was refloated on 2 March and towed in to the Dardanelles.
Gold	United Kingdom	The brigantine foundered before off Polperro, Cornwall. Her crew were rescued. She was on a voyage from Runcorn, Cheshire to Ostend, West Flanders, Belgium.

== 8 January ==
List of shipwrecks: 8 January 1868
Ship	State	Description
Anne Lowther	United Kingdom	The brig departed from Huelva, Spain for Liverpool, Lancashire. No further trace, presumed foundered with the loss of all hands.
Ellida	Norway	The schooner was abandoned with the loss of a crew member. She was on a voyage from Stathelle to Newcastle upon Tyne, Northumberland, United Kingdom. She was taken in to Grimsby, Lincolnshire, United Kingdom in a derelict condition.
Forfarshire	United Kingdom	The steamship struck a sunken rock off Craig, Forfarshire, then struck another rock before running aground on the Gyrees Rocks. She put back to Craig and was beached. Her passengers were taken off. She was on a voyage from Dundee to Newport, Fife.
Josefina	Uruguay	The ship was wrecked at Urcas, Brazil. She was on a voyage from Troon, Ayrshire, United Kingdom to Montevideo.
Persia	United States	The barque was driven ashore on Fire Island, New York. She was on a voyage from Kronstadt, Russia to New York City.

== 9 January ==
List of shipwrecks: 9 January 1868
Ship	State	Description
Coronet	United Kingdom	The ship was wrecked on the Bare Bush Key. Her crew were rescued. She was on a voyage from Plymouth, Devon to Pensacola, Florida.
Virginia Garcia	United Kingdom	The barque foundered in the Mediterranean Sea. Her crew were rescued by the steamship Italia (United Kingdom). Virginia Garcia was on a voyage from Trieste to Queenstown, County Cork.

== 10 January ==
List of shipwrecks: 10 January 1868
Ship	State	Description
Aurora	(Russian Empire) Grand Duchy of Finland	The brig was driven ashore and wrecked at "Thornby", Denmark. She was on a voyage from Newcastle upon Tyne, Northumberland, United Kingdom to Stockholm, Sweden.
Mary Lewis	United Kingdom	The schooner ran aground on the Baltic Reef. She was on a voyage from Llanelly, Glamorgan to Dieppe, Seine-Inférieure, France.
Try Again	United Kingdom	The schooner was wrecked near Caldera, Chile.
Ullswater	United Kingdom	The barque was wrecked at Ballymoney, County Wexford with the loss of eleven of her twelve crew. She was on a voyage from Liverpool, Lancashire to Rio de Janeiro, Brazil.
Vanguard	United Kingdom	The ship departed from Dundee, Forfarshire for Sunderland, County Durham. No further trace, presumed foundered with the loss of all eight crew.
Wye	United Kingdom	The brigantine was driven ashore at Rosario, Argentina.

== 11 January ==
List of shipwrecks: 11 January 1868
Ship	State	Description
Chicago	United Kingdom	The steamship struck rocks off Poorhead, County Cork and was wrecked. All on board were rescued. She was on a voyage from Liverpool, Lancashire to New York, United States. Chicago broke in two on 13 January.
Glentilt	United Kingdom	The barque was wrecked near Cabo San Antonio, Spain. She was on a voyage from Liverpool, Lancashire to Bahia, Brazil.
Jane Gardner	United Kingdom	The schooner was abandoned in the Atlantic Ocean. Her crew were rescued by Naval Reserve (United Kingdom). Jane Gardner was on a voyage from Rio de Janeiro, Brazil to an English port.
Resolution	United Kingdom	The brig was abandoned off the Berlengas, Portugal. Her crew were rescued by Neptune (United Kingdom). Resolution was on a voyage from Liverpool to Montevideo, Uruguay. She was towed in to the Tagus by Neptune.
Zero	Canada	The brigantine was abandoned in the Atlantic Ocean. Her crew were rescued by Albion (United Kingdom).
Unnamed	United Kingdom	The ship was wrecked at the mouth of the River Ribble.

== 12 January ==
List of shipwrecks: 12 January 1868
Ship	State	Description
Irwell	United Kingdom	The steamship was holed by ice off Hela, Prussia. She was on a voyage from Danzig to Hull, Yorkshire. She put back to Danzig sinking at the bow and was repaired there.
Talitha	United Kingdom	The ship struck the Upgang Rock, on the coast of Yorkshire. She was on a voyage from Hartlepool, County Durham to Middlesbrough, Yorkshire. She was refloated and taken in to Whitby, Yorkshire in a leaky condition.

== 13 January ==
List of shipwrecks: 13 January 1868
Ship	State	Description
Albion	United Kingdom	The brig ran aground off Whitford Point, Glamorgan, and was abandoned by her seven crew, who all subsequently drowned. She was on a voyage from Montevideo to Pembrey, Carmarthenshire.
Ceres	United Kingdom	The brig was driven ashore 7 nautical miles (13 km) south of Bridlington, Yorkshire. She was on a voyage from Seaham, County Durham to King's Lynn, Norfolk. She was refloated and resumed her voyage in a leaky condition, but had to be beached at Hornsea, Yorkshire.
Derwent	United Kingdom	The steamship ran aground on the Scroby Sands, Norfolk.
Genova	United Kingdom	The steamship struck a rock and was wrecked on São Miguel Island, Azores. She was on a voyage from São Miguel Island to London.
Jessie Collier	United Kingdom	The brig was driven ashore at Flamborough Head, Yorkshire. She was on a voyage from South Shields to London. She was refloated and assisted in to Great Yarmouth, Norfolk in a severely leaky condition.
Oasis	United Kingdom	The ship was wrecked in Tramore Bay with the loss of ten of her 37 crew. Twenty-one survivors were rescued by the Tramore Lifeboat Tom Egan ( Royal National Lifeboat Institution). Six crew were reported missing, presumed drowned. Oasis was on a voyage from Demerara, British Guiana to Liverpool, Lancashire.

== 14 January ==
List of shipwrecks: 14 January 1868
Ship	State	Description
Anémone	France	The ship was wrecked near Tramore, County Waterford, United Kingdom. Her crew were rescued.
East Indian	United Kingdom	The steamship foundered in the Bristol Channel off Lundy Island, Devon. Her sixteen crew survived. She was on a voyage from Porthcawl, Glamorgan to Liverpool, Lancashire.
Garrison	United Kingdom	The steamship ran aground on the Nore. She was on a voyage from Danzig to London. She was refloated and resumed her voyage.
George	Norway	The ship capsized and sank at Folkestone, Kent, United Kingdom.
James Longton	United Kingdom	The ship was wrecked at Cape St. Mary, Portugal. Her crew were rescued. She was on a voyage from Liverpool to Montevideo, Uruguay.
Mary Ann	United Kingdom	The brigantine struck a submerged object in the River Usk and sank.
Pride	United Kingdom	The ship was driven ashore at Goswick or Lindisfarne, Northumberland. She was on a voyage from Dundee, Forfarshire to London. She was refloated and towed in to Newcastle upon Tyne, Northumberland.
Red	United Kingdom	The schooner was driven ashore at Harrington, Cumberland. Her crew were rescued.
Restless	United Kingdom	The ship was driven ashore in a capsized condition at Shoreham-by-Sea, Sussex.
Visitor	United Kingdom	The ship was driven ashore at Lytham St. Annes, Lancashire. She was on a voyage from Sierra Leone to Liverpool.

== 15 January ==
List of shipwrecks: 15 January 1868
Ship	State	Description
Bolderaa	United Kingdom	The steamship ran aground at the Kronborg Castle, Helsingør, Denmark. She was on a voyage from London to Pillau, Prussia. She was refloated and taken in to Helsingør.
Euphrates	United Kingdom	The barque capsized 15 nautical miles (28 km) south west of Holyhead, Anglesey with the loss of all hands. She was on a voyage from Africa to Liverpool, Lancashire. She came ashore near Holyhead on 16 January.
Exile	Canada	The ship sank at Little Bay, Jamaica. She was later raised, repaired and returned to service as James Dougall, registered at Savannah-la-Mar, Jamaica.
Light of the Age	United Kingdom	The ship was wrecked at Point Lonsdale, Victoria. She was on a voyage from Liverpool to Melbourne, Victoria.
New Union	United Kingdom	The ship collided with John Watson (United Kingdom) and sank off Winterton-on-Sea, Norfolk. Her crew were rescued.
Zibiah	(United Kingdom of Great Britain and Ireland) Jersey	The ship ran aground on the Cutler Sand, in the North Sea off the coast of Suffolk. She was on a voyage from Gallipoli, Ottoman Empire to Hull, Yorkshire. She was refloated and taken in to Harwich, Essex in a leaky condition.
Unnamed	France	The powder hulk exploded at Toulon, Var with the loss of one life.

== 16 January ==
List of shipwrecks: 16 January 1868
Ship	State	Description
Eva Mina	United Kingdom	The ship was driven ashore.
J. C. Martin	United Kingdom	The schooner was run down and sunk off the Dudgeon Sand, in the North Sea by the steamship Vine (United Kingdom). J. C. Martin was on a voyage from London to South Shields, County Durham.
May Queen	United Kingdom	The ship ran aground on Sarn Badrig and was abandoned by her crew. She was on a voyage from Demerara, British Guiana to Greenock, Renfrewshire. She floated off on 18 January and came ashore 7 nautical miles (13 km) south of Portmadoc, Caernarfonshire, where she was wrecked.
Tasmanian Maid	United Kingdom	The paddle steamer was wrecked on Kawarau Reef at New Plymouth, New Zealand. All hands were saved.
Vanda	United Kingdom	The barque was driven ashore and wrecked at Poorhead, County Cork. Her crew were rescued by rocket apparatus.
No. 2	Prussia	The brig was driven ashore and wrecked at Crookhaven, County Cork. Her crew were rescued.

== 17 January ==
List of shipwrecks: 17 January 1868
Ship	State	Description
Atlantic	United Kingdom	The barque was driven ashore and wrecked in the Cymyran Strait, Anglesey. Her fifteen crew were rescued. She was on a voyage from Iquique, Chile to Glasgow, Renfrewshire.
Bispham	United Kingdom	The schooner was driven ashore in Kinvara Bay. She was on a voyage from Kinvara, County Galway to the Bristol Channel. She was refloated on 7 February and taken in to Galway.
Flora	United Kingdom	The ship foundered off the Cape of Good Hope, Cape Colony with loss of life. A message in a bottle washed up at Green Point, Cape Town on 20 January giving the news.
Helvellyn	United Kingdom	The ship foundered in the Atlantic Ocean 40 nautical miles (74 km) off Cape Clear Island, County Cork. Her crew were rescued by J. P. Tucker United Kingdom). Helvellyn was on a voyage from Greenock, Renfrewshire to Bombay, India.
Leading Star	United Kingdom	The brig ran aground on the Holm Sand in the North Sea off the coast of Suffolk. She was on a voyage from Sunderland, County Durham to Folkestone, Kent. She was refloated and assisted in to Lowestoft, Suffolk in a sinking condition.
Le Trois Sœurs	France	The ship was wrecked. Her crew were rescued by Esk, Hebe, Isabella Scott, Leipsic Packet, Pioneer and the steamship Triton (all United Kingdom).
Lilley	United Kingdom	The ship was driven ashore near Moyne, County Clare. She was on a voyage from Mexico to London.
Plato	United Kingdom	The barque was driven ashore and wrecked at Aldeburgh, Suffolk.
Queen of the Esk	United Kingdom	The ship was driven ashore at Whitehaven, Cumberland. Her crew were rescued. She was on a voyage from Dublin to Whitehaven.

== 18 January ==
List of shipwrecks: 18 January 1868
Ship	State	Description
Avon	United Kingdom	The steamship sank in the River Usk with the loss of six lives. She was on a voyage from Bristol, Gloucestershire to Newcastle upon Tyne, Northumberland.
Charles	United Kingdom	The ship was driven ashore near Pwllheli, Caernarfonshire. She was on a voyage from Africa to Liverpool, Lancashire. She was refloated on 10 February and taken in to Pwllheli.
Concord	United Kingdom	The brig sprang a leak and sank off St. Abbs Head, Berwickshire. Her eight crew survived. She was on a voyage from Southampton, Hampshire to Sunderland, County Durham.
Evamina	Norway	The schooner struck a rock and was wrecked at Egersund. Her crew were rescued. She was on a voyage from Sunderland, County Durham, United Kingdom to Egersund.
Louis David	United Kingdom	The steamship ran aground at Syros, Greece. She was refloated.
Maria	United Kingdom	The schooner was abandoned off Castletown, Isle of Man. Her crew were rescued by the Castletown Lifeboat. Maria was on a voyage from Cork to Barrow-in-Furness, Lancashire. She was towed in to Derbyhaven for repairs.
North Ash	United Kingdom	The ship was run ashore at Silloth, Cumberland. She was on a voyage from Dublin to Silloth. She was refloated on 10 February and taken in to Silloth in a severely damaged condition.
Rhoda	United Kingdom	The schooner ran aground off Great Yarmouth, Norfolk. She was on a voyage from São Miguel Island, Azores to Hull, Yorkshire. She floated off and sank. Her crew were rescued by the brig Graham (United Kingdom).
Vulcan	United Kingdom	The smack was damaged by fire at "Maghamorne".
Witch of the Wave	United Kingdom	The ship was driven ashore at Teignmouth, Devon.

== 19 January ==
List of shipwrecks: 19 January 1868
Ship	State	Description
Berenice	United Kingdom	The tug caught fire and sank at North Queensferry, Fife. Her crew survived.
Due Sorolle	Trieste	The ship was run ashore at Westport, County Mayo, United Kingdom.
Emma	United Kingdom	The brig was driven ashore near Maryport, Cumberland. She was on a voyage from Dublin to Maryport.
Emma and Laura	United Kingdom	The ship was driven ashore at Ramsey, Isle of Man.
Herman and Oscar	United Kingdom	The ship was driven ashore on Bird Island. She was on a voyage from Liverpool, Lancashire to Galveston, Texas, United States. She was a total loss.
Jane Miller	United Kingdom	The schooner foundered in the North Sea off the Farne Islands, Northumberland. Her four crew were rescued by a coble. She was on a voyage from Middlesbrough, Yorkshire to Dundee, Forfarshire.
Solar	United Kingdom	The ship foundered. Her crew were rescued by Moonbeam (United Kingdom).
Thetis	Canada	The brigantine was driven ashore and wrecked at Tacumshane, County Wexford, United Kingdom. Her crew were rescued. She was on a voyage from Wilmington, Delaware, United States to Liverpool, Lancashire, United Kingdom.
Utility	United Kingdom	The brig was driven ashore and severely damaged near Maryport. She was on a voyage from Dublin to Workington.
Unnamed	Flag unknown	The steamship foundered in the English Channel with the loss of all hands.

== 20 January ==
List of shipwrecks: 20 January 1868
Ship	State	Description
Emily	United Kingdom	The ship was driven ashore near Whitehaven, Cumberland. She was on a voyage from Dublin to Maryport, Cumberland.
Ghazipore	United Kingdom	The ship was abandoned 40 nautical miles (74 km) south of Queenstown, County Cork. Her 22 crew were rescued by the barque Britannia (United Kingdom). Ghazipore was on a voyage from Akyab, Burma to Liverpool, Lancashire.
Lily	United Kingdom	The ship was driven ashore near "Moyne", County Clare. She was on a voyage from Mexico to London.
Sasborough	United Kingdom	The steamship was sighted off Dungenes, Kent whilst on a voyage from South Shields, County Durham to Genoa, Italy. No further trace, presumed foundered with the loss of all hands.
Snowdon	United Kingdom	The barque was wrecked at Adra, Spain. She was on a voyage from Almería to Motril.

== 21 January ==
List of shipwrecks: 21 January 1868
Ship	State	Description
Addie Dicker	United States	The brig was wrecked on the Blanquilla Reef, off Veracruz, Mexico. Her crew were rescued. She was on a voyage from New Orleans, Louisiana to Veracruz.
Anne Marie	Denmark	The steamship departed from Stockholm, Sweden for Hull, Yorkshire. Presumed subsequently foundered. Wreckage from the ship washed up at Tversted in February.
Cossipore	United Kingdom	The ship was abandoned at sea. Her crew were rescued. She was on a voyage from Callao, Peru to Queenstown, County Cork.
Earl Dalhousie	United Kingdom	The ship was severely damaged by fire at sea. She was on a voyage from London to Sydney, New South Wales.
Gem	United Kingdom	The ship departed from Invergordon, Ross-shire for West Hartlepool, County Durham. No further trace, presumed foundered with the loss of all hands.
Noe	France	The ship ran aground on the Bruck Bank, in the North Sea off the coast of Nord and was wrecked.
Phœnix	United Kingdom	The ship was abandoned in ice off the Swedish coast. She was on a voyage from Saint Petersburg, Russia to London. She was towed in to Helsingor, Denmark by the steamship Øresund (Denmark).
Rowena	United Kingdom	The ship foundered in the Mediterranean Sea off Cape de Gatt, Spain. Her crew were rescued. She was on a voyage from Taganrog, Russia to Falmouth, Cornwall.

== 22 January ==
List of shipwrecks: 22 January 1868
Ship	State	Description
Albert	United Kingdom	The schooner was driven ashore and wrecked at Thisted, Denmark. She was on a voyage from Sunderland, County Durham to Lübeck.
Die Sonne	Prussia	The barque was wrecked at Par, Cornwall, United Kingdom with the loss of ten of the twelve people on board. Survivors were rescued by the Coastguard. She was on a voyage from Cardiff, Glamorgan to Barcelona, Spain.
Douglas Pennant	United Kingdom	The schooner was wrecked on the Dulas Rocks, Anglesey. Her four crew were rescued by the Moelfre Lifeboats Charles Seare and London Sunday School (both Royal National Lifeboat Institution). Douglas Pennant was on a voyage from Dublin to Bangor, Caernarfonshire.
Hind	United Kingdom	The schooner was driven ashore on Mew Island, in the Copeland Islands, County Down. She was on a voyage from Runcorn, Cheshire to Belfast, County Antrim.
Intimis	Netherlands	The brig ran aground on the Long Sand, in the North Sea off the cost of Essex, United Kingdom. She was on a voyage from South Shields, County Durham, United Kingdom to Trieste. She was refloated but consequently sank. Her crew were rescued.
Maria Louisa	United Kingdom	The ship was driven ashore and wrecked at Mullion, Cornwall. She was on a voyage from Padstow to Penzance.
Mary Ann	United Kingdom	The Thames barge struck a column of Cannon Street Bridge, London and sank.
N. Mosher	Canada	The ship was abandoned in the Atlantic Ocean. Her crew were rescued by the steamship Belgian (United Kingdom). N. Mosher was on a voyage from New York to Liverpool, Lancashire, United Kingdom or vice versa. She was discovered off Cape Sable Island, Nova Scotia on 25 January and taken in to the Fish Inlet, near Barrington, Nova Scotia.
Norfolk	United Kingdom	The steamship foundered off Ouessant, Finistère, France with the loss of all eighteen crew. She was on a voyage from Newcastle upon Tyne, Northumberland to Barcelona, Spain.
Richmond	United Kingdom	The barque ran aground on the Long Bank, in the Irish Sea off the coast of County Wexford. She was on a voyage from Liverpool to Madagascar.
Ocean Chief	United Kingdom	The ship was abandoned in the Atlantic Ocean. Her crew were rescued by Bessie Martin (United Kingdom). Ocean Chief was on a voyage from Cardiff, Glamorgan to Montevideo, Uruguay.
S. M. C.	United Kingdom	The schooner was driven ashore and wrecked at Mullion, Cornwall with the loss of all five crew.

== 23 January ==
List of shipwrecks: 23 January 1868
Ship	State	Description
Amethyst	United Kingdom	The ship foundered on the Bristol Channel off Llanelli, Glamorgan with the loss of all hands.
Annie	United Kingdom	The barque was driven ashore near the mouth of the Patapsco River. She was on a voyage from Baltimore, Maryland, United States to Queenstown, County Cork. She was refloated on 29 January and resumed her voyage.
Anne	United Kingdom	The ship was wrecked on Burry Holms, in the Bristol Channel with the loss of all five crew. She was on a voyage from Llanelli to Bideford, Devon.
Brothers	United Kingdom	The ship was driven ashore and wrecked at Broughton, Glamorgan. Her crew were rescued.
Catherine	United Kingdom	The ship foundered off Llanelli with the loss of all hands.
Ceres	United Kingdom	The pilot boat was driven ashore at Llanelli. Her crew were rescued.
Charles Walker	United Kingdom	The ship was lost at Llanelli with the loss of all six crew.
Eliza	(United Kingdom of Great Britain and Ireland) Jersey	The ship foundered off Llanelli with the loss of all six people on board.
Fanny	United Kingdom	The ship was driven ashore and wrecked at Llanelli with the loss of all hands.
Huntress	United Kingdom	The ship was driven ashore at Broughton with the loss of all hands. at least six lives.
Jane	United Kingdom	The schooner was abandoned off Padstow, Cornwall. Her crew were rescued by a pilot gig. She was subsequently wrecked on the Doom Bar. Jane was on a voyage from Pentewan, Cornwall to Liverpool, Lancashire.
Jeune Celine	(United Kingdom of Great Britain and Ireland) Jersey	The lugger was wrecked on a rock or foundered in the Bristol Channel off Llanelli with the loss of all four crew.
Jeune Citoyen	(United Kingdom of Great Britain and Ireland) Jersey	The ship was wrecked on the coast of Glamorgan with the loss of all hands.
Maggie Maxwell	United Kingdom	The schooner was abandoned in the Irish Sea. Her crew were rescued by Madonna (United Kingdom). Maggie Maxwell was on a voyage from Newquay, Cornwall to Swansea, Glamorgan. She was taken in to Milford Haven, Pembrokeshire the next day in a derelict condition.
Mahtoree	United Kingdom	The barque was run into by a Prussian full-rigged ship and sank in the English Channel off Dungeness, Kent. Her crew were rescued by a hoveller. She was on a voyage from Hartlepool, County Durham to Bordeaux, Gironde, France.
Maria	Hamburg	The ship was driven ashore at Scratby, Norfolk, United Kingdom. Her crew were rescued. She was on a voyage from Hartlepool to Málaga, Spain.
Marie Leocadie	United Kingdom	The barque ran aground and was wrecked at Bridport, Dorset, United Kingdom. She was on a voyage from Newcastle upon Tyne, Northumberland to Bridport.
Mary Ann	United Kingdom	The ship foundered off Llanelli with the loss of all but one of her crew. The survivor was rescued by a pilot boat.
Mary Fanny	United Kingdom	The ketch was driven ashore and damaged in Rhossili Bay with the loss of five of her six crew. The survivor was rescued by a pilot boat. She was later repaired and returned to service.
Onward	United Kingdom	The brig foundered on the Burry Holms with the loss of four of the nine people on board.
Peacock	United Kingdom	The barque was driven ashore and wrecked near Burnfoot, Ayrshire. Her crew were rescued.
Procyon	France	The brigantine was driven ashore and wrecked near the mouth of the Adour. Her crew were rescued.
Roscino, or Roscius	United Kingdom	The ship was driven ashore and wrecked at Llanelli with the loss of all hands.
Ruby	United Kingdom	The ship collided with a barque and foundered off Southwold, Suffolk.
Sally	United Kingdom	The ship foundered in the Atlantic Ocean 16 nautical miles (30 km) north north east of Trevose Head, Cornwall. Her crew survived. She was on a voyage from Cork to King's Lynn, Norfolk.
Samuel and Susannah	United Kingdom	The Yorkshire Billyboy was driven ashore and wrecked at Wells-next-the-Sea, Norfolk. Her crew were rescued. She was on a voyage from Hull, Yorkshire to Ipswich, Suffolk.
Sophie	France	The ship foundered in the Bristol Channel off Llanelli with the loss of all hands.
St. Catherine	United Kingdom	The brig was wrecked at Llanelli with the loss of all six crew.
Susan Ive	United Kingdom	The schooner was driven ashore at Padstow with the loss of two of her five crew. Survivors were rescued by rocket apparatus.
Waterlily	United Kingdom	The schooner was wrecked on Burry Holms. Her four crew were rescued. She was on a voyage from Llanelly to Rouen, Seine-Inférieure, France.
Wilfred	United Kingdom	The ship was wrecked at Plouescat, Finistère, France with the loss of three of her crew. She was on a voyage from Madras, India to London.
Unnamed	Prussia	The schooner ran aground on the Cockle Sand, in the North Sea off the coast on Norfolk. She was refloated and beached at Mundesley, Norfolk. Her crew were rescued.

== 24 January ==
List of shipwrecks: 24 January 1868
Ship	State	Description
Alert	United Kingdom	The ship was driven ashore at Moville, County Donegal. Her crew were rescued.
Allegro	United Kingdom	The ship was driven onto the Sand-end Bank, off Burntisland, Fife.
Ann	United Kingdom	The sloop was driven ashore and wrecked at Lindisfarne, Northumberland. Her crew were rescued. She was on a voyage from Anstruther, Fife to Sunderland, County Durham.
Beccles	United Kingdom	The brig ran aground on the Maplin Sand, in the North Sea off the coast of Essex. She was refloated.
Britain's Bride	United Kingdom	The ship was wrecked on the South Brake Sand, off the Kent coast. Her crew were rescued by the Ramsgate Lifeboat. She was on a voyage from London to the Cape of Good Hope, Cape Colony. She was refloated and towed in to Ramsgate, Kent in a leaky condition.
Caradoc	United Kingdom	The ship was driven ashore 6 nautical miles (11 km) north of Ramsey, Isle of Man with the loss of her captain. She was on a voyage from Maryport, Cumberland to Dublin.
Ceres	Denmark	The brig ran aground on the Maplin Sand. She was refloated.
Charm	United Kingdom	The smack was driven into the breakwater and sank at Granton, Lothian. Her four crew survived.
Cherub	United Kingdom	The schooner was driven ashore and wrecked on Rutland Island, County Donegal. She was on a voyage from Glasson Dock, Lancashire to Tralee, County Kerry.
Collins	United Kingdom	The ship was wrecked on the Isle of Man with the loss of all hands.
Cupido	Prussia	The barque was run ashore and sank at Alexandria, Egypt. Her crew were rescued. She was on a voyage from Newcastle upon Tyne, Northumberland, United Kingdom to Alexandria.
Delhi	United Kingdom	The brig foundered in the Solway Firth with the loss of all fourteen people on board. She was on a voyage from Maryport to Dublin.
Diligence	United Kingdom	The sloop was wrecked at Eastbourne, Sussex. Her crew survived. She was on a voyage from Yarmouth, Isle of Wight to Eastbourne.
Dryad	United Kingdom	The schooner was driven ashore 3 nautical miles (5.6 km) north of Ramsey. Her crew were rescued. She was on a voyage from Silloth, Cumberland to Kingstown, County Dublin.
Eclipse	United Kingdom	The collier was driven ashore at Moville. Her crew were rescued.
Elease	United Kingdom	The brigantine was wrecked on the Cooksmacraig Rock, off the coast of Wigtownshire with the loss of all five crew and a would-be rescuer.
Elizabeth	United Kingdom	The ship ran aground off Trouville-sur-Mer, Calvados, France. She was on a voyage from South Shields, County Durham to Trouville-sur-Mer. She floated off on 26 January and was driven ashore. Her crew were rescued.
Graces	United Kingdom	The brig ran aground on the Kentish Knock and sank. Her crew survived. She was on a voyage from Newcastle upon Tyne, Northumberland to Boulogne, Pas-de-Calais, France.
Intelligent	France	The ship was abandoned. She was on a voyage from Gravelines, Nord to London. She was subsequently taken in to Ramsgate, Kent in a severely leaky condition.
Jane	United Kingdom	The ship was driven ashore and wrecked at Aberdeen. Her ten crew were rescued. She was on a voyage from Montevideo, Uruguay to Aberdeen.
Jeune Heloise	France	The brigantine was driven ashore and wrecked at Campbeltown, Argyllshire, United Kingdom. Her crew were rescued. She was on a voyage from Ardrossan, Ayrshire United Kingdom to Nantes, Loire-Inférieure.
John and Jane	United Kingdom	The Yorkshire Billyboy was driven ashore at Harwich, Essex. She was on a voyage from Maldon, Essex to Hartlepool, County Durham. She was refloated on 26 January and taken in to Harwich.
Juno	United Kingdom	The schooner foundered off Land's End, Cornwall Her crew were rescued.
Lubinka	Russia	The barque was driven ashore and severely damaged at Stornoway, Isle of Lewis, United Kingdom.
Magdalene and Sophie	United Kingdom	The ship was driven ashore 2 nautical miles (3.7 km) north of Ramsey. Her crew were rescued. She was on a voyage from Silloth to Dublin.
Majesty	United Kingdom	The brig was wrecked in Penberth Cove, Cornwall. Her crew were rescued.
Margaret	United Kingdom	The ship was driven ashore and wrecked at Moville. Her crew were rescued.
Mary Jane	United Kingdom	The lighter was driven ashore at Dumbarton Castle. Her crew survived.
Meteor Flag	United Kingdom	The ship was driven ashore at Moville. Her crew were rescued. She was refloated.
Nimrod	United Kingdom	The brigantine sprang a leak and foundered off Ilfracombe, Devon. She was on a voyage from Swansea, Glamorgan to Fremington, Devon.
Niphon	United Kingdom	The steamship was wrecked 25 nautical miles (46 km) south of Amoy, China with the loss of thirteen lives.
Release	United Kingdom	The brigantine was wrecked near Portpatrick, Wigtownshire with the loss of all five crew.
Repita	Spain	The ship ran aground on the Goodwin Sands, Kent. She was on a voyage from South Shields to Cádiz. She was refloated and resumed her voyage, but put in to Portsmouth, Hampshire, United Kingdom.
Sarah	United Kingdom	The brig foundered off Lambay Island, County Dublin with the loss of all seven crew. She was on a voyage from Whitehaven, Cumberland to Dublin.
St. Agnes	United Kingdom	The ship struck the Wolf Rock, Cornwall and foundered. Her crew were rescued. She was on a voyage from the Rio Grande to Liverpool, Lancashire.
Yanikale	United Kingdom	The barque capsized off the Corsewall Lighthouse, Wigtownshire. She was being towed from Belfast to Ardrossan.
Ythan	United Kingdom	The schooner was driven ashore at Lindisfarne. Her crew were rescued. She was on a voyage from Arbroath, Forfarshire to Sunderland. Ythan was refloated on 26 January.
Unnamed	Norway	The barque was driven ashore on "Barat Island", Forfarshire.

== 25 January ==
List of shipwrecks: 25 January 1868
Ship	State	Description
Alarm	United Kingdom	The sloop was driven ashore at Diélette, Manche, France.
Alfred	United Kingdom	The ship was driven ashore in the Strangford Lough. She was on a voyage from Bangor, Caernarfonshire to "Quail"
Alford	United Kingdom	The ship was driven ashore in the Belfast Lough.
Annie	United Kingdom	The brig was driven ashore on Great Cumbrae, Argyllshire. She was on a voyage from Liverpool, Lancashire to Newcastle upon Tyne, Northumberland. She was refloated on 13 February and taken in to Greenock, Renfrewshire.
Arthemise Maria	France	The ship was driven ashore at Betteville, Seine-Inférieure. She was on a voyage from Plymouth, Devon, United Kingdom to Jersey, Channel Islands.
Britain's Pride	United Kingdom	The ship ran aground on the Brake Sand. She was on a voyage from London to the Cape of Good Hope, Cape Colony. She was refloated and assisted in to Ramsgate, Kent in a leaky condition.
Colonist	United Kingdom	The brig was wrecked on the Langness Peninsula, Isle of Man with the loss of all hands.
City of Melbourne	United Kingdom	The ship was destroyed by fire at Williamstown, Victoria.
Creole	United Kingdom	The brig ran aground on the Carrick Bank, in the Belfast Lough and was abandoned by her crew. She was refloated and towed in to Belfast, County Antrim.
Dirk Hatterick	United Kingdom	The brigantine was wrecked on the Bryn-y-Bar Rocks, near Cwmerran, Anglesey. Her crew were rescued She was on a voyage from Liverpool to Cardiff, Glamorgan.
Edward Stonard	United Kingdom	The ship was driven ashore at Anstruther, Fife.
Emily Jane	United Kingdom	The schooner was wrecked in Loch Ryan with the loss of all hands.
Equity	United Kingdom	The brigantine was driven ashore and wrecked 2 nautical miles (3.7 km) south of Dunwich, Suffolk. Her crew were rescued by the Dunwich Lifeboat.
Fancy	United Kingdom	The smack was driven ashore at Belhelvie, Aberdeenshire. Both crew were rescued.
Flora McDonald	United Kingdom	The schooner was driven ashore and wrecked in Loch Ewe. Her crew were rescued.
Fly	United Kingdom	The schooner ran aground on the Carrick Bank and was abandoned by her crew. She was refloated and towed in to Belfast.
Fox	(United Kingdom of Great Britain and Ireland) Isle of Man	The smack was run ashore in Rortyerock Bay, Wigtownshire. Her crew were rescued. She was on a voyage from Liverpool to Peel. She floated off and sank.
Grace	United Kingdom	The ship ran aground on the Kentish Knock and was abandoned by her crew. She was on a voyage from Newcastle upon Tyne to Boulogne, Pas-de-Calais, France.
Hannah Dora	United Kingdom	The ship struck rocks near Stepper Point, Cornwall and was damaged. She was on a voyage from Llanelly, Glamorgan to Southampton, Hampshire. She was taken in to Padstow, Cornwall.
Idwal	United Kingdom	The schooner was driven ashore and wrecked at Sligo with the loss of all but one of her crew.
Industrious Helen	United Kingdom	The schooner was driven ashore at Lindisfarne, Northumberland. Her crew were rescued by the Lindisfarne Lifeboat.
Ipswich	United Kingdom	The schooner was driven onto the Seaton Sea Rocks, on the coast of Northumberland. She was on a voyage from Ipswich, Suffolk to Invergordon, Ross-shire.
Jane	(United Kingdom of Great Britain and Ireland) Jersey	The barque foundered off Aberdeen. Her crew were rescued by the Aberdeen Lifeboat. She was on a voyage from Montevideo, Uruguay to Aberdeen.
Lord Warden	United Kingdom	The ship was driven ashore near "Rosevale". She was refloated and assisted in the Whitby, Yorkshire.
Lowe	United Kingdom	The schooner was holed by an anchor and sank at St. Helen's, Isle of Wight. She was on a voyage from Hartlepool, County Durham to Brading, Isle of Wight.
Magicienne	United Kingdom	The ship was driven ashore at Kingsgate, Kent. She was on a voyage from South Shields, County Durham to Portsmouth, Hampshire. She was refloated and taken in to Ramsgate, Kent in a leaky condition.
Manilla	Spain	The barque was driven ashore at Bilbao. Her crew were rescued. She was on a voyage from Liverpool, Lancashire, United Kingdom to Havana, Cuba.
Mersey	United Kingdom	The barque ran aground on the West Hoyle Bank, in Liverpool Bay with the loss of four of the seventeen people on board. Survivors were rescued by the Point of Ayr Lifeboat. She was on a voyage from Liverpool to Arica, Peru.
Mischief	United Kingdom	The schooner was driven ashore at Lindisfarne. Her crew were rescued by the Lindisfarne Lifeboat. She was on a voyage from Macduff, Aberdeenshire to South Shields. She was refloated and beached.
Pitfour	United Kingdom	The barque was driven ashore and wrecked near Burnfoot.
Sarah	United Kingdom	The ship was driven ashore near "Drinlington". She was on a voyage from Newcastle upon Tyne to Caen, Calvados, France. She was refloated and taken in to Bridlington, Yorkshire in a leaky condition.
Thetis	United Kingdom	The brig was driven ashore at Belfast. She was on a voyage from Maryport, Cumberland to Dublin.
Three Sisters	United Kingdom	The lighter was driven ashore and wrecked at Scalpsie Point, Isle of Bute with the loss of two of her three crew. She was on a voyage from Glasgow, Renfrewshire to Fort William, Inverness-shire.
Trader	United Kingdom	The ship was driven ashore and wrecked at West Wemyss, Fife. She was on a voyage from Beauly, Inverness-shire to Portsmouth. She was refloated and taken in to West Wemyss.
William and Sarah	United Kingdom	The brig was abandoned on the Dogger Bank (55°04′N 3°50′E). Her seven crew were rescued by the smack Hero (United Kingdom). William and Sarah was on a voyage from Havre de Grâce, Seine-Inférieure, France to South Shields. She came ashore at "Hagovring", on the west coast of Jutland on 11 February.
Zebra	United Kingdom	The brigantine was wrecked on Coll, Inner Hebrides with the loss of all hands.
Unnamed	United Kingdom	The brig was driven ashore at Sannesund, Norway. Her crew were rescued.
Unnamed	France	The ship was driven ashore near Diélette.

== 26 January ==
List of shipwrecks: 26 January 1868
Ship	State	Description
Elizabeth	United Kingdom	The brig was driven ashore at Trouville-sur-Mer, Manche, France. Her crew were rescued.
Elwine Fredericke	Prussia	The galeas ran aground on the Dragoe Sand, in the Baltic Sea. She was on a voyage from Swinemünde to Hull, Yorkshire, United Kingdom. She was refloated the next day and resumed her voyage.
Joanna	(United Kingdom of Great Britain and Ireland) New Zealand	The 26-ton schooner went ashore near Sinclair Head during a storm. The crew survived by taking to a lifeboat.
Johan Benjamin	Prussia	The barque ran aground on the Dragoe Sand. She was on a voyage from Memel to Hull. She was refloated on 29 January.
Unnamed	Flag unknown	The ship foundered off the Calf of Man, Isle of Man. Her seven crew were rescued.

== 27 January ==
List of shipwrecks: 27 January 1868
Ship	State	Description
Aurora	United Kingdom	The ship was driven ashore at Tornby, Sweden in a derelict condition. She was on a voyage from Newcastle upon Tyne, Northumberland to Stockholm, Sweden.
Celestine	United Kingdom	The ship was driven ashore. She was on a voyage from Trieste to Antwerp, Belgium.
Forge, or Tonge	United Kingdom	The brig was driven ashore and wrecked in St. Finane's Bay, County Cork.
India	Netherlands	The ship was driven ashore at Hellevoetsluis, Zeeland. She was on a voyage from Java, Netherlands East Indies to a Dutch port.
Island Queen	United States	The ship was driven ashore at Almería, Spain. She was on a voyage from New Orleans, Louisiana to Cádiz.
Maria Hopkins	United States	The schooner was wrecked on the Folle Reef, off the coast of Haiti. Her crew survived. She was on a voyage from Antigua to Santiago de Cuba, Cuba.
Pearl	United Kingdom	The ship sank at Penzance, Cornwall. She was on a voyage from Newcastle upon Tyne to Teignmouth, Devon.
Scorpion	United Kingdom	The ship ran aground off Great Yarmouth, Norfolk. She was refloated and taken in to Great Yarmouth in a leaky condition.
Virginia	United Kingdom	The smack ran aground or struck a sunken wreck on the Cross Sand, in the North Sea off the coast of Norfolk and sank. Her crew were rescued by a Prussian galiot.
Wapella	United States	The ship was driven ashore and wrecked 5 nautical miles (9.3 km) north of Barmouth, Merionethshire, United Kingdom with much loss of live. There were four survivors. She was on a voyage from New Orleans, Louisiana to Liverpool, Lancashire, United Kingdom.

== 28 January ==
List of shipwrecks: 28 January 1868
Ship	State	Description
Advance	Norway	The ship was wrecked at "Tanager". She was on a voyage from Copenhagen, Denmark to Stavanger.
Albion	United Kingdom	The ship was abandoned in the Atlantic Ocean. All on board were rescued by Bombay (United Kingdom). Albion was on a voyage from Demerara, British Honduras to London.
Banks	United Kingdom	The barque was driven ashore and wrecked at Portland Bill, Dorset. She was on a voyage from South Shields, County Durham to Kurrachee, India.
Berceau	France	The ship was driven ashore at Broadhaven, Pembrokeshire, United Kingdom. She was on a voyage from Swansea, Glamorgan, United Kingdom to Nantes, Loire-Inférieure.
Blanche	United Kingdom	The ship was driven ashore at Lamlash, Isle of Arran. She was on a voyage from Troon, Ayrshire to Dublin.
Ellen	United Kingdom	The brig sank at South Shields, County Durham. Her crew were rescued. She was on a voyage from Seaham, County Durham to Aberdeen.
Julie	France	The ship was driven ashore near Trondheim, Norway. She was condemned.
Pursuit	United Kingdom	The ship was driven ashore at Lamlash. She was on a voyage from Troon to Belfast, County Antrim.
Ravensworth	United Kingdom	The ship ran aground at Middlesbrough, Yorkshire. She was on a voyage from Middlesbrough to Cardiff, Glamorgan. She was refloated and resumed her voyage, but put in to Great Yarmouth, Norfolk in a leaky condition.
Southern Queen	United Kingdom	The ship ran aground at Bombay, India. She was on a voyage from Liverpool, Lancashire to Bombay. She was refloated and taken in to Bombay in a leaky condition.
William	United Kingdom	The ship was driven ashore at Lamlash. She was on a voyage from Liverpool, Lancashire to Largs, Ayrshire.
William Bell	United Kingdom	The ship was driven ashore at Lamlash. She was on a voyage from Ayr to Workington, Cumberland.

== 29 January ==
List of shipwrecks: 29 January 1868
Ship	State	Description
Ann Augusta	United Kingdom	The ship was driven ashore at Cranfield Point, County Down and was damaged. She was on a voyage from Saint John, New Brunswick, Canada to Dundee, Forfarshire. She was refloated on 10 March and taken in to Warrenpoint, County Down.
Bienville	France	The barque-rigged steamship was driven ashore and wrecked at Veracruz, Mexico with the loss of seven of her crew.
Caroline Alice	United Kingdom	The ship ran aground in the River Nene. She was on a voyage from Wisbech, Cambridgeshire to Newcastle upon Tyne, Northumberland. She was refloated and taken in to King's Lynn, Norfolk in a leaky condition.
Carlino	Italy	The brig was lost near Milazzo, Sicily. Her crew were rescued. She was on a voyage from Taganrog, Russia to an English port.
Charlotte	Flag unknown	The ship sank in the Kattegat. She was on a voyage from Copenhagen, Denmark to Gothenburg, Sweden.
Claudia	United Kingdom	The derelict brig was towed in to Holyhead, Anglesey by the tug United States (United Kingdom).
Eleanor	United Kingdom	The brig was driven ashore at Wells-next-the-Sea, Norfolk. She was on a voyage from Sunderland, County Durham to Genoa, Italy. She was refloated on 6 February and taken in to Wells-next-the-Sea.
Ethel	United Kingdom	The ship was driven ashore and wrecked on Hesselø, Denmark. She was on a voyage from Aarhus, Denmark to an English port.
Febo	United Kingdom	The ship was wrecked at Corrubedo, Spain. She was on a voyage from Liverpool, Lancashire to Malta.
Idea	United Kingdom	The ship was driven ashore at Dover, Kent. She was on a voyage from Boston, Massachusetts, United States to Newcastle upon Tyne, Northumberland.
Nightingale	United States	The steamship was wrecked on reefs off Fort Santiago, Veracruz with the loss of seven of her crew.
Richard Denton	United Kingdom	The ship was driven ashore and wrecked at Ostend, West Flanders, Belgium. She was on a voyage from Sunderland to Ostend.
Rosebud	United Kingdom	The ship foundered in the Gulf of Lyons. Her crew were rescued by the barque Dolphin ( Grand Duchy of Oldenburg). Rosebud was on a voyage from Thessaloniki, Greece to Falmouth, Cornwall.
Tyne	United Kingdom	The steamship ran aground in the Lynn Deeps and was damaged. She was on a voyage from Middlesbrough, Yorkshire to Trieste. She was refloated.
Vartry	United Kingdom	The steamship collided with another vessel and sank near Hellevoetsluis, Zeeland, Netherlands.

== 30 January ==
List of shipwrecks: 30 January 1868
Ship	State	Description
Æolus	Hamburg	The ship ran aground at Ottendorf, Kingdom of Prussia. She was on a voyage from Philadelphia, Pennsylvania, United States to Hamburg. She was refloated on 1 January 1868 and resumed her voyage.
Circassian	United Kingdom	The ship was driven ashore near Rodosto, Ottoman Empire. She was on a voyage from Varna, Ottoman Empire to and English port. She had become a wreck by 12 February.
HMS Endymion	United Kingdom	The Ister-class frigate collided with HMS Lord Warden (Royal Navy) and Mahmoudiah (Ottoman Navy) at Valetta, Malta and was damaged.
Garbuck	United Kingdom	The lighter capsized and sank in the Clyde. Her crew were rescued.
Hare Bell	United Kingdom	The brig ran aground on Portland Point, Jamaica. She was on a voyage from Santa Marta, United States of Colombia to Bremen. She was refloated with assistance from HMS Onyx (Royal Navy) and resumed her voyage.
Venus	United Kingdom	The ship sank off Lindisfarne, Northumberland. She was on a voyage from Sunderland, County Durham to Dundee, Forfarshire.

== 31 January ==
List of shipwrecks: 31 January 1868
Ship	State	Description
Echo	United Kingdom	The barque ran aground and was wrecked on the Stoney Binks, off the mouth of the Humber. She was on a voyage from the River Plate to Hull, Yorkshire.
Garibaldi	United Kingdom	The schooner collided with a brig and sank in the River Thames at Charlton, Kent.
Glasgow	United Kingdom	The steamship ran aground at Sligo.

== Unknown date ==
List of shipwrecks: Unknown date in January 1868
Ship	State	Description
Alice	United Kingdom	The ship was wrecked at "Schweningen". She was on a voyage from the Ionian Islands, Greece to Hamburg.
Allerton	United Kingdom	The brig was wrecked on Imbros, Ottoman Empire before 17 January. She was on a voyage from Enez, Ottoman Empire to Falmouth, Cornwall.
Almira	United States	The ship was wrecked on Cape Sable Island, Nova Scotia, Canada. She was on a voyage from Yarmouth, Massachusetts to Fox Island Main, Nova Scotia.
Anglican	United Kingdom	The ship foundered in the Bristol Channel off Lundy Island, Devon. Her crew were rescued. She was on a voyage from Portland, Maine, United States to Plymouth, Devon.
Arizona	Hamburg	The barque ran aground and was wrecked in the Lombok Strait before 10 January. She was on a voyage from Hamburg to Manila, Spanish East Indies.
Blonde	United Kingdom	The ship was driven ashore at Minatitlan, Mexico before 24 January. All on board were rescued.
Catherine Elizabeth	Netherlands	The ship was driven ashore on "Duivea Island" before 10 December. She was refloated with the assistance of a steamship and taken in to Surabaya, Netherlands East Indies.
Carlo C.	Malta	The ship was wrecked before 4 January. She was on a voyage from Bourgas, Ottoman Empire to Malta.
C. R. C.	United Kingdom	The barque foundered in the Atlantic Ocean before 18 January.
Dea del Mare	Italy	The ran aground in the Bosphorus. She was on a voyage from Odesa, Russia to an English port.
Expert	United Kingdom	The ship was wrecked at Mauritius before 19 January.
Forfarshire	United Kingdom	The steamship ran aground on the Beacon Rocks before 8 January and was consequently beached. She was later refloated.
Gouverneur Schemerus	Flag unknown	The ship was wrecked at "Asisinee".
Hastings	United Kingdom	The ship ran aground in the Dardanelles. She was on a voyage from Swansea, Glamorgan to Constantinople, Ottoman Empire. She was refloated and resumed her voyage.
Hebe	United Kingdom	The ship was driven ashore at Strömstad, Sweden. She was on a voyage from Newcastle upon Tyne to Christiania, Norway.
Idaho	United States	The fishing schooner sank in a gale on the Grand Bank. Lost with all 8 crewmen.
Inga	United Kingdom	The ship was driven ashore at Strömstad. She was on a voyage from London to Moss, Norway.
J. E. Woodward	United States	The ship was driven ashore at Nantucket, Massachusetts.
Julia	United Kingdom	The ship was wrecked near the mouth of the Rio Grande. She was on a voyage from the Clyde to Montevideo, Uruguay.
Lorano	United States	The ship was wrecked near Beyrout, Ottoman Syria before 4 January. She was on a voyage form Beyrout to Boston, Massachusetts.
Maggie Rose	United Kingdom	The ship was abandoned at sea. She was on a voyage from Weymouth, Nova Scotia, Canada to Barbados.
Manuel	Spain	The ship was wrecked at Santa Cruz de Tenerife, Canary Islands.
Minna	Bremen	The ship was wrecked in the Freewill Islands before 15 January. Seven people were rescued on that date by Sarah March (United Kingdom).
Miquelonais	France	The barque foundered in the Atlantic Ocean. Her crew were rescued by the brigantine Lapwing (United Kingdom). Miquelonais was on a voyage from Saint Domingo to Havre de Grâce, Seine-Inférieure.
Moses Waring	United States	The schooner was abandoned off New York. Her crew were rescued by Minnie Gorton (United States). Moses Waring was on a voyage from Brunswick, Georgia to New York.
Nueva Margherita	Spain	The ship ran aground in the Dardanelles. She was on a voyage from Sulina, Ottoman Empire to Marseille, Bouches-du-Rhône, France. She was refloated and resumed her voyage.
Paul and Frederick	Wismar	The schooner was wrecked oh the Haisborough Sands, in the North Sea off the coast of Norfolk, United Kingdom with the loss of all but two of her crew.
Peterborough	United Kingdom	The ship ran aground on the Woosung Spit. She was on a voyage from London to Shanghai, China.
Queen of Scots	United States	The barque was driven ashore on "Malden Island". She was on a voyage from Philadelphia, Pennsylvania to Antwerp, Belgium.
Rose del Teilo	Spain	The ship was lost on a voyage from the Clyde to Manila, Spanish East Indies.
Schweinga	Flag unknown	The steamship was abandoned at sea. She was on a voyage from Newcastle upon Tyne to Rio de Janeiro, Brazil.
St. George	Hamburg	The ship was destroyed by fire at sea before 22 January. Her crew were rescued. She was on a voyage from Liverpool, Lancashire, United Kingdom to Guatemala City, British Honduras.
St. Paul	France	The ship was wrecked on the St. Brandon Shoals, in the Indian Ocean 230 nautical miles (430 km) north east of Mauritius with some loss of life. She was on a voyage from Mauritius to Bombay, India.
Tigre	Spain	The ship was wrecked at Santiago de Cuba, Cuba.
Tonsberg	Prussia	The ship foundered in the Atlantic Ocean. She was on a voyage from Batavia, Netherlands East Indies to Amsterdam, North Holland, Netherlands.
Tony	United Kingdom	The brig was wrecked near Valentia Island, County Cork.
Verona	Austria-Hungary	The ship was abandoned in the Adriatic Sea by all but her captain. She was towed in to Ancona, Papal States.
Welford	United Kingdom	The ship was driven onto the Powercourt Rocks, off Belize City, British Honduras and sank. She was on a voyage from Madras, India to London.
