= Pembrey Burrows =

Coastal site in Carmarthenshire, Wales

Coordinates: 51.67527°N 4.30240°W

Pembrey Burrows stretch from Burry Port's harbour area – a former coal port, now a marina – to Pembrey Country Park, a leisure and nature complex that is one of West Wales's leading visitor attractions.

The Burrows not only provide sanctuary of coastal wildlife but are also a source of seafood for the local residents – including razor clams and samphire. The coast is easily accessed by foot or bicycle by way of the Millennium Coastal Path. Slightly inland is the championship Ashburnham Golf Course and the village of Pembrey itself.

Pembrey centres on a village square and magnificent St. Illtyd's Church Celtic Christianity. Court Farm on Pembrey's Mountain Road dates back to Norman times, reputedly established by Arnold le Boteler. Pembrey also encompasses the Welsh Motor Sports Centre at the former RAF Pembrey Sands; Pembrey Airport with its flying school; and Pembrey Mountain, popular with walkers. The village was once the home of Rhodesian Prime Minister Ian Smith while serving in the Royal Air Force.

== See also ==
- Pembrey Circuit
- Pembrey Airport
- Court Farm, Pembrey

Pembrey and Burry Port railway station
