= Sarah Thomas (centenarian) =

Welsh centenarian

Sarah Thomas (5 February 1788 – 29 January 1897) was a Welsh centenarian who died aged 108.

== Biography ==
Thomas was from Carmarthenshire and was a native of Whitland where her parents were farm labourers on Ffynoncyll farm near Whitland. She died at her daughter's home in Pencoed Cottages in Burry Port after moving from Llanelly where she had lived with her husband. Shortly before Christmas in 1896 Thomas was believed to be dead and was examined by a doctor. She was in fact in a comatose state, and remained so for 30 hours. She eventually awoke and her "first request" after waking was for her pipe and tobacco. Thomas smoked a clay pipe for 60 years and preferred smoking to eating in her final years. In her obituary The Llanelly Mercury and South Wales Advertiser reported that she "indulged in the fragrant weed with the zest of a person half her years". She consumed three ounces of shag every week, which was supplied to her for free by Messrs Franklyn and Davey. She was survived by her daughter; a second daughter had died several years previously. Thomas had 16 grandchildren. She was buried in Llanelly Cemetery.

A letter was written to the royal courtier Dighton Probyn detailing Thomas's extreme age. The private secretary to the Princess of Wales replied enclosing a cheque for £5 and 6 shillings (representing a shilling for every year of her life) for Thomas (equivalent to £731 in 2023) and advised the recipient "to spend it in the way you most think advisable for her comfort and pleasure".

The readers of the South Wales Daily News were urged to enter Thomas for a competition for a £2 weekly pension for a year (equivalent to £292 in 2023) offered by Tit-Bits magazine.
