= Pembrey =

Village in Carmarthenshire, Wales

Coordinates: 51°41′N 4°17′W

Pembrey: Welsh: Pen-bre
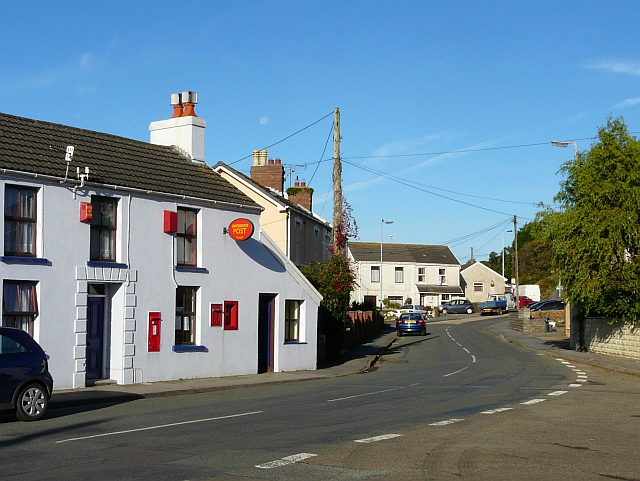
- Pembrey village post office

- Location within Carmarthenshire
- Population: 2,154 (2011)
- OS grid reference: SN4201
- Community: Pembrey and Burry Port Town
- Principal area: Carmarthenshire
- Preserved county: Dyfed
- Country: Wales
- Sovereign state: United Kingdom
- Post town: BURRY PORT
- Postcode district: SA16
- Dialling code: 01554
- Police: Dyfed-Powys
- Fire: Mid and West Wales
- Ambulance: Welsh
- UK Parliament: Llanelli
- Senedd Cymru – Welsh Parliament: Llanelli

Pembrey (Welsh: Pen-bre) is a village in Carmarthenshire, Wales, situated between Burry Port and Kidwelly, overlooking Carmarthen Bay, with a population of about 2,154 in 2011. The electoral ward having a population of 4,301. It is in the community of Pembrey and Burry Port Town.

== History ==
The name Pembrey is an Anglicisation of the Welsh, Pen-bre. "Pen" is a Welsh word meaning head or top, and "bre" is an old Celtic word for a promontory.

The coastline began its retreat from the foot of Pembrey Mountain some 6,000 years ago, revealing land which shows human occupation since the Iron Age, with hill forts dating from around 400 BC. The population of the region was known to the Romans as Demetae. Roman pottery remains have been unearthed in the oldest parts of the village. Later, the village was part of the Welsh principality of Deheubarth. Evidence of an early Norman motte-and-bailey castle has been suggested close to the village square and buildings remain in the village from later Norman times.

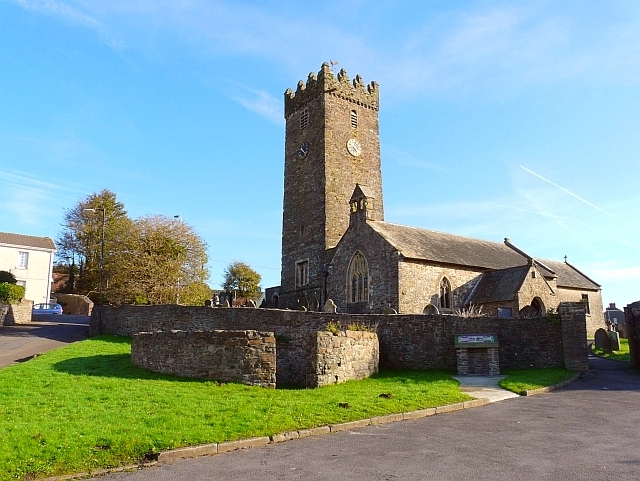
St Illtyd's church

The village was home to Arnold le Boteler, a Norman squire of the 12th century. His manor, Court Farm, Pembrey, subsequently extended into a Jacobean manor house and then a farm, is now derelict. The le Boteler (Butler) crest can be seen in the village church of St. Illtud, established during le Boteler's lifetime with its saint's name connected to his other estate of Dunraven, Southerndown, near Llantwit Major, Bridgend. St Illtyd's is a grade II* listed building.

Most of the village was created during the 18th and 19th century coal mining boom, when Pembrey was a port. Pembrey Mountain (Welsh: Mynydd Penbre) was thoroughly mined by both Welsh and English companies for about 100 years and some reserves are said to remain underground. Pembrey's harbour was prone to silting and was abandoned in favour of Pembrey New Harbour - soon renamed Burry Port Harbour, just a mile further upstream on the Burry Estuary. The original harbour is now known as Pembrey Old Harbour.

Pembrey's mountain and beach Cefn Sidan are reputed to have provided some villagers with careers as wreckers, known locally as Gwyr-y-Bwelli Bach (translated as People with Little Hatchets) - attracting sailing ships with fires purporting to be beacons, then raiding them when they foundered. However, no firm evidence of wrongdoing such as booty has ever been discovered. Nevertheless, a number of vessels were certainly lost around Pembrey, including "La Jeune Emma" bound from the West Indies to France and blown badly off course in 1828. 13 of the 19 on board drowned, including Adeline Coquelin, the 12-year-old niece of Napoleon Bonaparte's divorced wife Josephine de Beauharnais. She is buried at St. Illtyds Church, Pembrey. The last large ship to be lost was the four-masted windjammer, the SS Paul, carrying a cargo of timber and grounding in a storm in 1925.

=== Manor families ===
From the days of le Boteler to the early 20th century, Pembrey was generally dominated by at least one leading family. Latest of these was the Ashburnham family (Earl of Ashburnham) who lived until the 1920s at Pembrey House, lost to fire some 50 years ago. The Ashburnham Golf Club championship course is the area's main sporting attraction, Ashburnham Road is one of the village's two main thoroughfares and the Ashburnham Hotel one of its hostelries.

=== Military and RAF Pembrey ===
Military connections include the past use of areas of the Ashburnham estate as a firing range. In the 20th century, a RAF station, RAF Pembrey was situated in Pembrey and played a role in Britain's defences as home to both fighter and bomber aircraft. Close by, a Royal Ordnance Factory, ROF Pembrey, provided high explosives for Britain's war effort. Both these facilities attracted a number of Luftwaffe raids over the village during World War II. One airman based and living in Pembrey, Wing Commander Guy Gibson, went on to lead the Dambusters. Flying ace Robert Stanford Tuck was at Pembrey with 92 Squadron in 1940.

An attempt to establish a munitions testing range in Pembrey was made during the 1960s but was resisted by villagers, who mounted a SOS (Save Our Sands) campaign. The opposition proved successful, leading to the establishment of Pembrey Country Park instead.

Royal Air Force training continues on a bombing range to the west of Pembrey Country Park near Kidwelly. The RAF Red Arrows aerobatics display team performed over Kidwelly's carnival, with many of their stunts taking place over the village of Pembrey itself.

=== Lifeboat station ===
Pembrey had a RNLI lifeboat station from 1863 to 1887, succeeding a station at Llanelli, when accumulation of sand at Pembrey forced a move to Burry Port.

== Today ==
Today, the village has lost most of its former sources of employment and is largely a dormitory for the nearby urban areas of Llanelli and Carmarthen. Tourism has been successfully developed at the Country Park, along the Millennium Coastal Path and at nearby Burry Port although accommodation is limited to caravanning, a few bed & breakfasts and the Ashburnham Hotel.

In August/September 2006, Court Farm appeared in the first round of BBC2's Restoration Village programme. Experts agreed that the building mainly requires a new roof and could be restored to form a cultural centre. The manor did not progress through the competition and has subsequently been passed to the Cadw Sir Gaerfyrddin Cyf. (Carmarthenshire Building Preservation Trust) who, along with The Friends Of Court Farm, are actively seeking funds to restore the building; an in-principle Cadw grant of 40% has been awarded for consolidation works to start the restoration project.

Pembrey Burrows and Cefn Sidan are now part of extensive leisure areas run by local authorities. Attractions include the Millennium Coastal Path, Ski Pembrey, an artificial ski centre and toboggan ride, St. Illtyd's Church and village square, mountain walks and picnic areas, the traditional links golf course, Pembrey Old Harbour, Pembrey Country Park, the Pembrey Circuit - the National Motorsport Centre of Wales, horse-riding, a working airfield and flying club at Pembrey Airport, and St. Illtyds Church. The Carmarthenshire Land Sailing Club is allowed to use the beach for wind traction activities, including Land sailing, kite buggying and Kite landboarding.

On entering the country park, several abandoned bunkers are visible, these being the remains of the former Royal Ordnance Factory that closed in 1965. The woods and bunkers provided a focus point for an episode of Living TV's Most Haunted, which was aired in April 2008.

The village's name has also been applied to Pembrey, Delaware, in the United States, a short drive from Philadelphia.

== Notable people ==
- Edward Banks (1820–1910), an amateur cricketer who played first-class cricket for Kent County Cricket Club
- Sir John Ivan George Cadogan CBE FIC FRS (1930–2020), a British organic chemist.
- Hugh Davies (1932–2017), a Welsh cricketer and a summariser for BBC Radio Cymru
- Josh Sheehan (born 1995), a professional footballer with over 200 club caps and 5 for Wales

== Transport ==
Actually located in Burry Port, Pembrey and Burry Port railway station is on the West Wales line with regular services to Milford Haven and Manchester via Cardiff as well as twice-daily to London. Between 1909 and 1953 Pembrey station on the Burry Port and Gwendraeth Valley Railway served the village. The village is served by bus on routes from Carmarthen and Swansea. The nearest motorway is the M4. Pembrey Airport has no scheduled services but provides facilities for visiting private and corporate aircraft, including executive jets, Pembrey Airfield is one of the most military active civil airports in Britain so PPR is often needed, Pembrey Airfield does offer facilities for passenger aircraft but only as charter flights.

== Climate ==
Climate data for Pembrey Sands (1991–2020)
Month	Jan	Feb	Mar	Apr	May	Jun	Jul	Aug	Sep	Oct	Nov	Dec	Year
Record high °C (°F)	13.4 (56.1)	16.9 (62.4)	21.4 (70.5)	25.4 (77.7)	29.3 (84.7)	34.9 (94.8)	34.2 (93.6)	34.2 (93.6)	28.4 (83.1)	23.9 (75.0)	17.3 (63.1)	14.9 (58.8)	34.9 (94.8)
Mean daily maximum °C (°F)	8.3 (46.9)	8.5 (47.3)	10.4 (50.7)	12.9 (55.2)	15.9 (60.6)	18.1 (64.6)	19.8 (67.6)	19.7 (67.5)	18.0 (64.4)	14.8 (58.6)	11.4 (52.5)	9.0 (48.2)	13.9 (57.0)
Daily mean °C (°F)	5.5 (41.9)	5.6 (42.1)	7.0 (44.6)	9.0 (48.2)	11.8 (53.2)	14.3 (57.7)	16.2 (61.2)	16.1 (61.0)	14.3 (57.7)	11.5 (52.7)	8.3 (46.9)	6.1 (43.0)	10.5 (50.9)
Mean daily minimum °C (°F)	2.7 (36.9)	2.6 (36.7)	3.6 (38.5)	5.2 (41.4)	7.8 (46.0)	10.6 (51.1)	12.7 (54.9)	12.6 (54.7)	10.6 (51.1)	8.3 (46.9)	5.2 (41.4)	3.2 (37.8)	7.1 (44.8)
Record low °C (°F)	−10.4 (13.3)	−8.1 (17.4)	−7.9 (17.8)	−5.0 (23.0)	−3.8 (25.2)	0.8 (33.4)	1.9 (35.4)	2.4 (36.3)	−0.3 (31.5)	−4.6 (23.7)	−8.8 (16.2)	−10.7 (12.7)	−10.7 (12.7)
Average precipitation mm (inches)	113.5 (4.47)	81.9 (3.22)	71.2 (2.80)	67.9 (2.67)	68.8 (2.71)	73.3 (2.89)	73.9 (2.91)	95.4 (3.76)	78.4 (3.09)	123.4 (4.86)	129.4 (5.09)	125.4 (4.94)	1,102.5 (43.41)
Average precipitation days (≥ 1.0 mm)	16.1	13.1	12.6	11.3	10.5	10.6	10.9	12.0	11.4	15.6	16.9	16.2	157.3
Source 1: Met Office
Source 2: Starlings Roost Weather

== See also ==
- Pembrey Circuit
- RAF Pembrey
