= Burry Port =

Port town and community in Carmarthenshire, Wales

Coordinates: 51.69°N 4.25°W

Burry Port: Welsh: Porth Tywyn
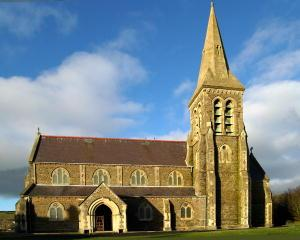
- St Mary's Church

- Location within Carmarthenshire
- OS grid reference: SN445015
- Community: Pembrey and Burry Port Town
- Principal area: Carmarthenshire
- Preserved county: Dyfed
- Country: Wales
- Sovereign state: United Kingdom
- Post town: BURRY PORT
- Postcode district: SA16
- Dialling code: 01554
- Police: Dyfed-Powys
- Fire: Mid and West Wales
- Ambulance: Welsh
- UK Parliament: Llanelli
- Senedd Cymru – Welsh Parliament: Llanelli

Burry Port (Welsh: Porth Tywyn) is a port town and community in Carmarthenshire, Wales, on the Loughor estuary (Moryd Llwchwr), to the west of Llanelli and south-east of Kidwelly. Its population was recorded at 5,680 in the 2001 census and 6,156 in the 2011 census, and estimated at 5,998 in 2019. The town has a harbour.

It is also where Amelia Earhart landed as the first woman to fly across the Atlantic Ocean. Nearby are the Pembrey Burrows sand dune and wetland system, forming a country park, and the Cefn Sidan sands. Its musical heritage includes Burry Port Opera, Male Choir and Burry Port Town Band.

== Etymology ==
The etymology of the River Burry, from which Burry Port takes its English name, is uncertain. It may derive from Old English byrig "fort" (cf. the ending -bury found in many English place names), referring to the small fort at North Hill Tor, or as it does elsewhere on the south Wales coast, to sand dunes, especially those associated with rabbit warrens (cf. the English word burrow). The Welsh name for the town, Porth Tywyn, means "port/bay of the sand dune".

== Geography ==
Burry Port lies 5 miles west of the town of Llanelli. It sits at the mouth of the Loughor estuary, looking south towards the picturesque Gower peninsula. West of the town's shoreline is Pembrey Burrows, a large area of burrow and marshland which historically occupied many square miles of land, much of which has later been reclaimed. To the north of the town is the hill Mynydd Donny, or Pembrey Mountain. Further north lie the Gwendraeth Valleys. The Gwendraeth Fawr runs north easterly from Kidwelly for about twelve miles (19 km). The land around the valley itself contains large amounts of coal as well as limestone. The Gwendraeth Fawr flows the length of the valley, and joins its sister river the Gwendraeth Fach west of Kidwelly before flowing into Carmarthen Bay.

=== Climate ===
Climate data for Pembrey Sands Air Weapons Range (1991–2020 normals)
Month	Jan	Feb	Mar	Apr	May	Jun	Jul	Aug	Sep	Oct	Nov	Dec	Year
Mean daily maximum °C (°F)	8.3 (46.9)	8.5 (47.3)	10.3 (50.5)	12.9 (55.2)	15.9 (60.6)	18.1 (64.6)	19.8 (67.6)	19.7 (67.5)	18.0 (64.4)	14.8 (58.6)	11.4 (52.5)	9.0 (48.2)	13.9 (57.0)
Mean daily minimum °C (°F)	2.7 (36.9)	2.6 (36.7)	3.6 (38.5)	5.2 (41.4)	7.8 (46.0)	10.6 (51.1)	12.7 (54.9)	12.6 (54.7)	10.6 (51.1)	8.2 (46.8)	5.2 (41.4)	3.2 (37.8)	7.1 (44.8)
Average rainfall mm (inches)	113.5 (4.47)	81.9 (3.22)	71.2 (2.80)	67.9 (2.67)	68.8 (2.71)	73.3 (2.89)	73.9 (2.91)	95.4 (3.76)	78.4 (3.09)	123.4 (4.86)	129.4 (5.09)	125.4 (4.94)	1,102.5 (43.41)
Average rainy days (≥ 1 mm)	16.1	13.1	12.6	11.3	10.5	10.6	10.9	12.0	11.4	15.6	16.9	16.2	157.3
Source: Met Office

== Early history ==
Burry Port is a modern settlement, but the nearby village of Pembrey dates from the Middle Ages, as shown by the medieval tower of the Church of St Illtud. People made a living in Burry Port from farming and fishing before the Industrial Revolution brought the railways and collieries to the area. As Pembrey Burrows was a hazard to shipping, local people would also salvage what they could from boats wrecked in storms while navigating the Bristol Channel.

Pembrey sands have proved the final resting place of many ships, some by mishap, others it is said lured to their doom deliberately to provide plunder for the wreckers known as "Gwyr-y-Bwelli Bach" or "The Men of Little Hatchets". They were named after the locally made tool, a hatchet incorporating a claw for ripping open cargo and equally useful for dispatching unwanted witnesses to the wreckers' activities.

From the late 18th century a network of canals and then tramways grew up to carry coal from inland mines to the sea. Pembrey Harbour dates from 1819, but it proved too small and was followed by Pembrey New Harbour in 1836. This became known as Burry Port Harbour before it was completed.

== Industrial history ==
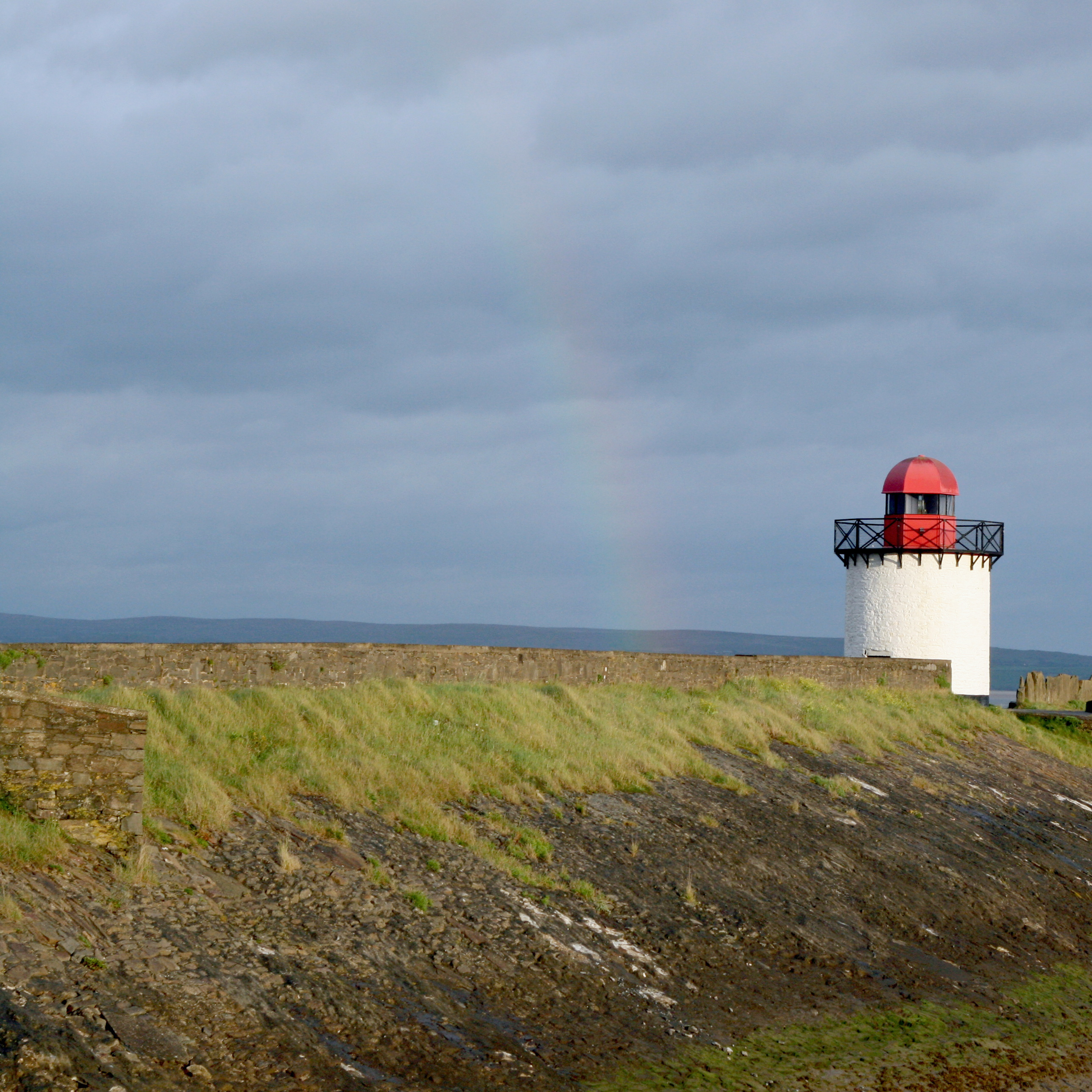
Burry Port Lighthouse.

=== Coal mining and the Burry Port Harbour ===
Records indicate that coalmining was established in the valley as early as 1540, although there was little effective transport. The Gwendraeth Fawr at the time was navigable but treacherous.

Growing interest in coal, limestone and iron ore drove the growth of the coal trade. Thomas Kymer, owner of many mining and other operations in the area established several loading places and primitive trackways to load barges on the Gwendraeth Fawr. Cargo was carried down the Gwendraeth river and then up the Towy to Carmarthen. In 1768 Kymer opened a canal and quay, part of which is today restored and preserved. The canal cut through the marshes allowing boats to travel upstream far enough to reach solid ground where quays could be built. This allowed barges to operate at all times and without having to wait for tides to get inland. A canal alone was not sufficient to solve the transport problems and wagonways were built to carry traffic from the mines to the canal itself. Several of these wagonways became plateways and then railways as technology improved.

A second canal was cut by the Earl of Ashburnham in 1798 to serve his mines nearby and this also was fed by wagonways. The canals continued to expand and wharves and dock facilities were built. More mines continued to open further up the valley sending their coal down through the canals to the sea. The trade in coal was hindered heavily however as the shifting sands made the river treacherous and the safe paths changed year by year.

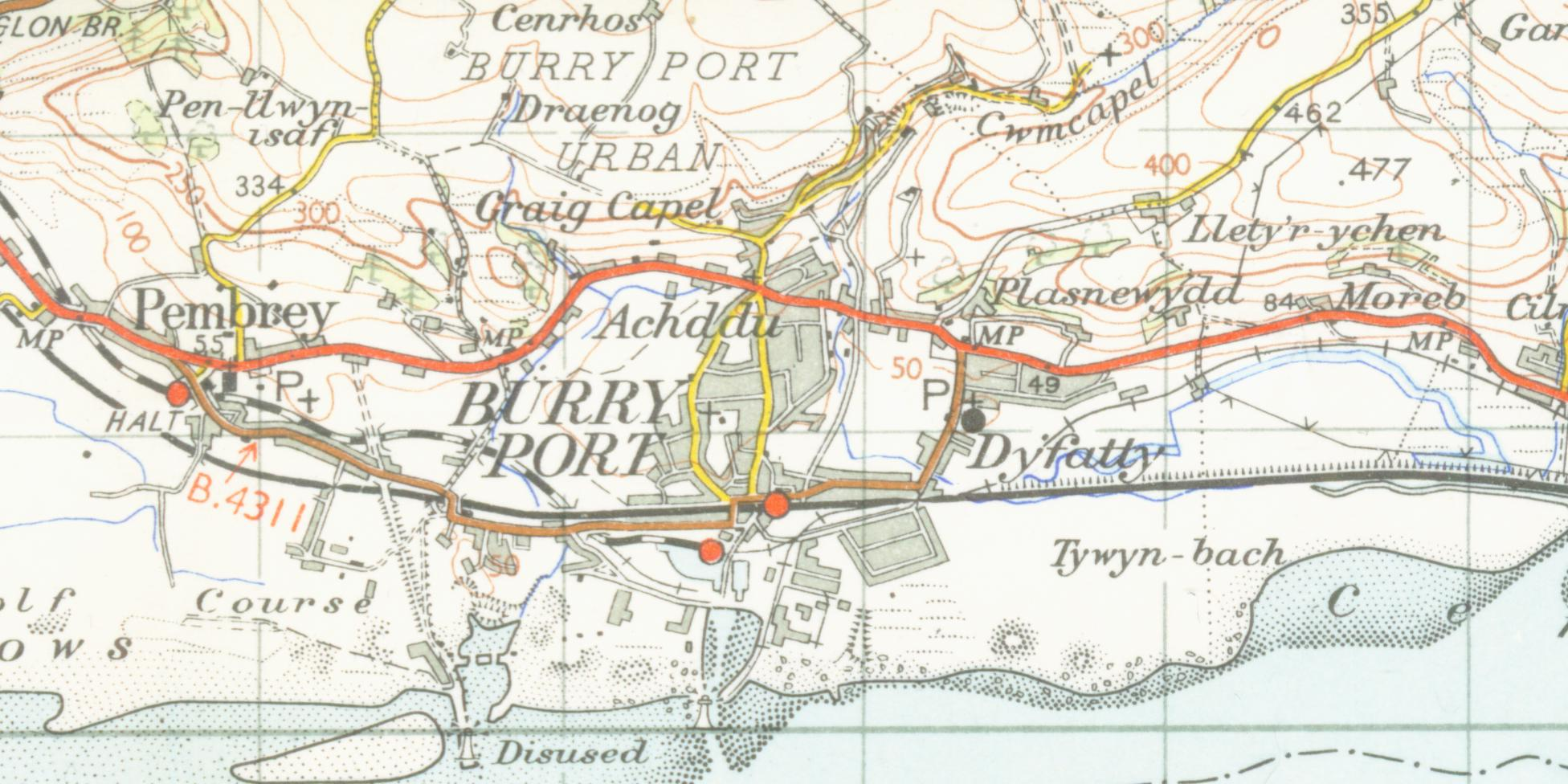
Burry Port in 1952.

In 1832, a harbour was built at Burry Port, a few years after the nearby harbour at Pembrey opened. Fed by a series of chaotic canals and wagonways it finally offered a way to ship Gwendraeth coal out by sea. Supporters of the harbour believed that its location offered considerable potential for expansion, especially as it had the advantage over neighbouring Llanelli Harbour that ships did not need to navigate the narrow channel along the Loughor estuary. In June 1838, John H. Browne, clerk to the Burry Port Harbour Company, wrote to the Cambrian newspaper drawing attention to these advantages after an article on port facilities in the South Wales Coalfield failed to refer to Burry Port. In 1841, an account of the potential development of the anthracite coalfield highlighted the potential of Burry Port Harbour to accommodate larger ships than could progress through the narrow channel to the larger port at Llanelli.

No village or town of Burry Port yet existed. By 1840, the canals feeding Burry Port and their tramways fed coal from the entire Gwendraeth valley down to the sea. Early records of Burry Port as a town appear around 1850, springing up around the new docks adjacent to Pembrey. The importance of the newly emerging town was plain when the railways reached Burry Port, and the station serving both Pembrey and the new town of Burry Port was built a few hundred yards down from Pembrey at Burry Port.

The canal network was now unable to handle the loads from the Gwendraeth valley mines and part of the canal network was converted into the Burry Port and Gwendraeth Valley Railway by the late 1860s with the port continuing to grow in importance and shipping volumes. It did not, however, achieve the levels of trade that many had anticipated and went into gradual decline in the 20th century.

=== Copper works ===
In 1848 a copper works was opened on a site adjacent to the harbour, and became a major employer and a key feature in the growth of the town. The main activity centred around a smelting furnace where copper ore was roasted and melted, and having removed the impurities, the refined copper was made into ingots and sheets. The works were established by Messrs. Mason and Elkington of Birmingham and the principal chimney, at 250 feet, was described in 1853 as a principal landmark for miles around.

=== Carmarthen Bay Power Station ===
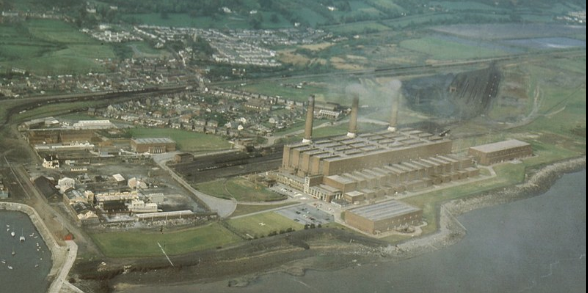
Carmarthen Bay Power Station from the air, circa 1972

Carmarthen Bay Power Station was built on the north shore of the Burry Estuary, occupying some 220 acres. Work started on its construction in April 1947, and power was first generated on 28 June 1953. At this time the plant employed around 500 people and during its 31 years of operation the three stacks became a local landmark. The power station ceased generating in 1984, and was demolished in the early 1990s.

== Present day ==
With the closure of all the mines at Cwm Mawr, the railways up the valley were lifted. The harbour is now a marina for small leisure craft. Pembrey and Burry Port railway station remains, with regular services east via Swansea and Cardiff to London and west into Pembrokeshire.

For shopping, the town is served by a small supermarket, specialist shops, several hairdressers, a beauty and skincare salon, and an array of pubs and fast food outlets.

The public services include a lending library and four schools. Glan-y-Mor Comprehensive School (Glan-y-Mor translates as "Seashore") has about 600 pupils. There is also a Welsh primary school – Ysgol Parc y Tywyn – and English-medium infants and junior schools in the town. It is also home to a lifeboat station, situated in Burry Port Harbour.

Burry Port lies on the Millennium Coastal Path from Bynea near Llanelli to Pembrey Burrows.

== Governance ==
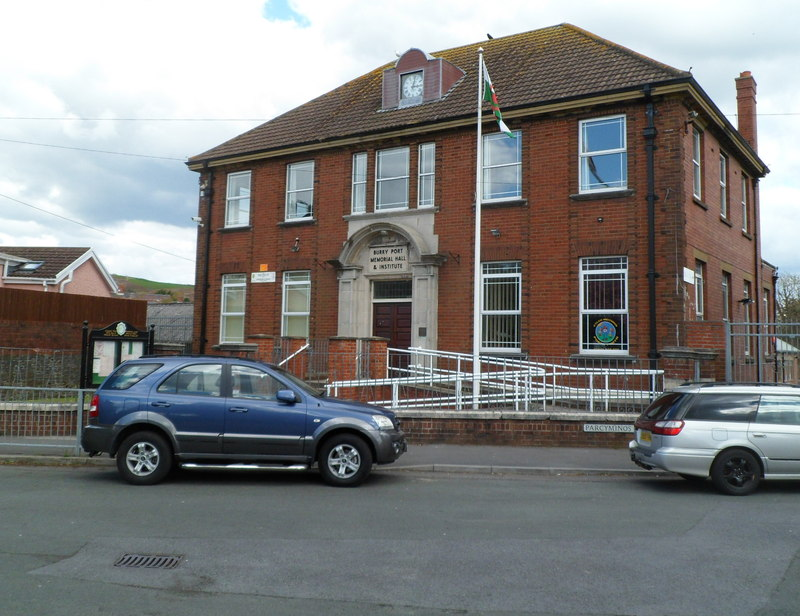
Burry Port Memorial Hall and Institute

There are two tiers of local government covering Burry Port, at community (town) and county level: Pembrey and Burry Port Town Council and Carmarthenshire County Council. The town council is based at the Memorial Hall and Institute on Parc-Y-Minos Street, which had been built in 1934.

Burry Port lies in the Llanelli parliamentary constituency, which has been held by the Labour Party since 1922.

Burry Port is an electoral ward for elections to Carmarthenshire County Council.

=== Administrative history ===
The Burry Port area historically formed part of the parish of Pembrey in Carmarthenshire. When elected parish and district councils were established in 1894, Pembrey was given a parish council and included in the Llanelly Rural District. As a result of the rapid growth of the town, in 1903 Burry Port was made its own urban district and civil parish.

Burry Port Urban District existed from 1903 until 1974. It was abolished in 1974 under the Local Government Act 1972. A community called Burry Port was created instead. District-level functions passed to Llanelli Borough Council. Carmarthenshire County Council was abolished as part of the same reforms, with county-level functions passing to the new Dyfed County Council. The borough of Llanelli and county of Dyfed were both abolished in 1996 and their councils' functions passed to a re-established Carmarthenshire County Council. In 1986 the community of Burry Port was merged with most of the neighbouring community of Pembrey to become a community named Cefn Sidan after the beach which forms much of the area's coast. In 1999 the Cefn Sidan community was renamed Pembrey and Burry Port.

== Religion ==
St Mary's represents the Anglican Church in Wales. Jerusalem (Congregationalist) Chapel is the survivor of several chapels built in the locality in the 19th century; the minister there for several years was the former Archdruid of Wales, Meirion Evans. At the evening service to mark Christmas 2022 in Jerusalem Chapel Emyr Phillips was recognised for his 50 years of service as a Deacon to the chapel by Christopher Owen, the chapel Minister. Not in the 200 plus year history of the chapel has a Deacon served for 50 years.

Other former nonconformist chapels that have closed in the 21st century include Tabernacle (Welsh Baptist), now a chapel of rest; Seion (Welsh Congregationalist); and Bethany (Calvinistic Methodist). A war memorial from Bethany was transferred to Bethel, Pembrey, when the chapel closed.

== Amelia Earhart, the first woman to cross the Atlantic by air. ==
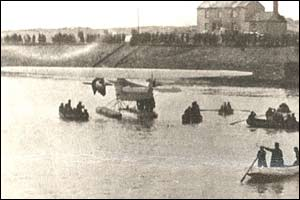
Amelia Earhart's arrival in Burry Port.

The event which put Burry Port at the centre of the World's attention, and for which it is still known globally.

The 18th of June 1928, saw the surprise arrival of the seaplane "Friendship" a Fokker FVIIb 3m, whose crew consisted of, pilot Wilmer Stultz, with mechanic and co-pilot Louis Gordon and the flight's commander, a then unknown social worker from Boston named Amelia Earhart. The plane came down on the Burry estuary between Burry Port and the village of Pwll at 12:40pm, at low tide. After many hours on the estuary, deliberating whether to refuel on the estuary and fly on to Southampton (contrary to popular belief, a seaplane's journey does not end when it is still at sea), to end their transatlantic flight in front of their sponsors, who were waiting there.But It was decided that, due to the racing tide, they wouldn't attempt to refuel but come ashore at Burry Port Harbour, where their journey would finally end and where Amelia Earhart would become the first woman to cross the Atlantic by air.

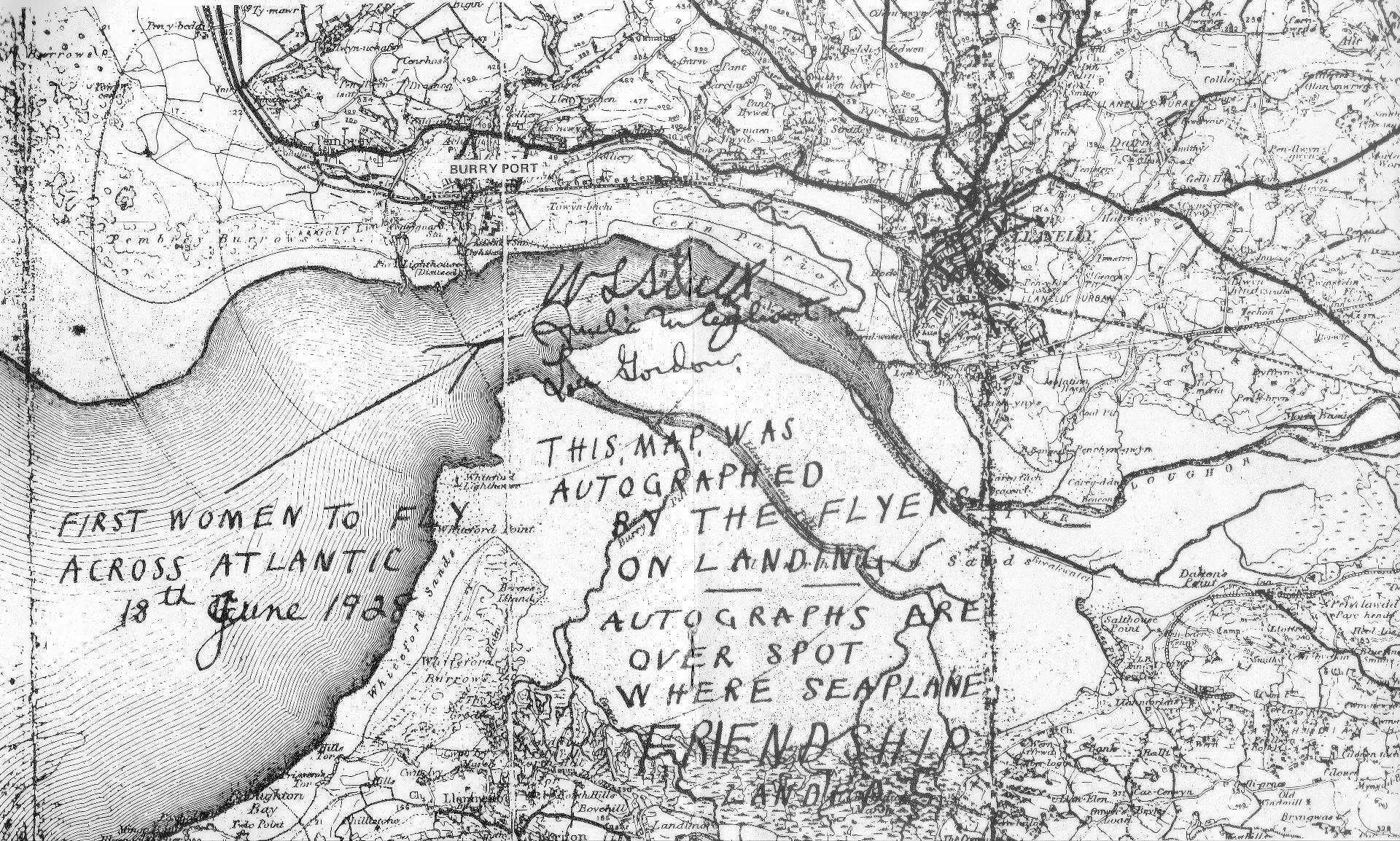
Landing site of the seaplane Friendship in the Burry estuary.

They spent the night at the Ashburnham Hotel. The next morning, sitting up in bed and surrounded by members of the press, Earhart said to Alice Jones, the proprietor of the hotel, "How lovely your country is, The stillness and the silence brings back again the almost awesome feeling which came to me as, hour after hour, we pushed forward through the thick clouds and fog. It was as if we were alone in the world. To think that 48 hours ago I was in America and now I am in Wales!”.

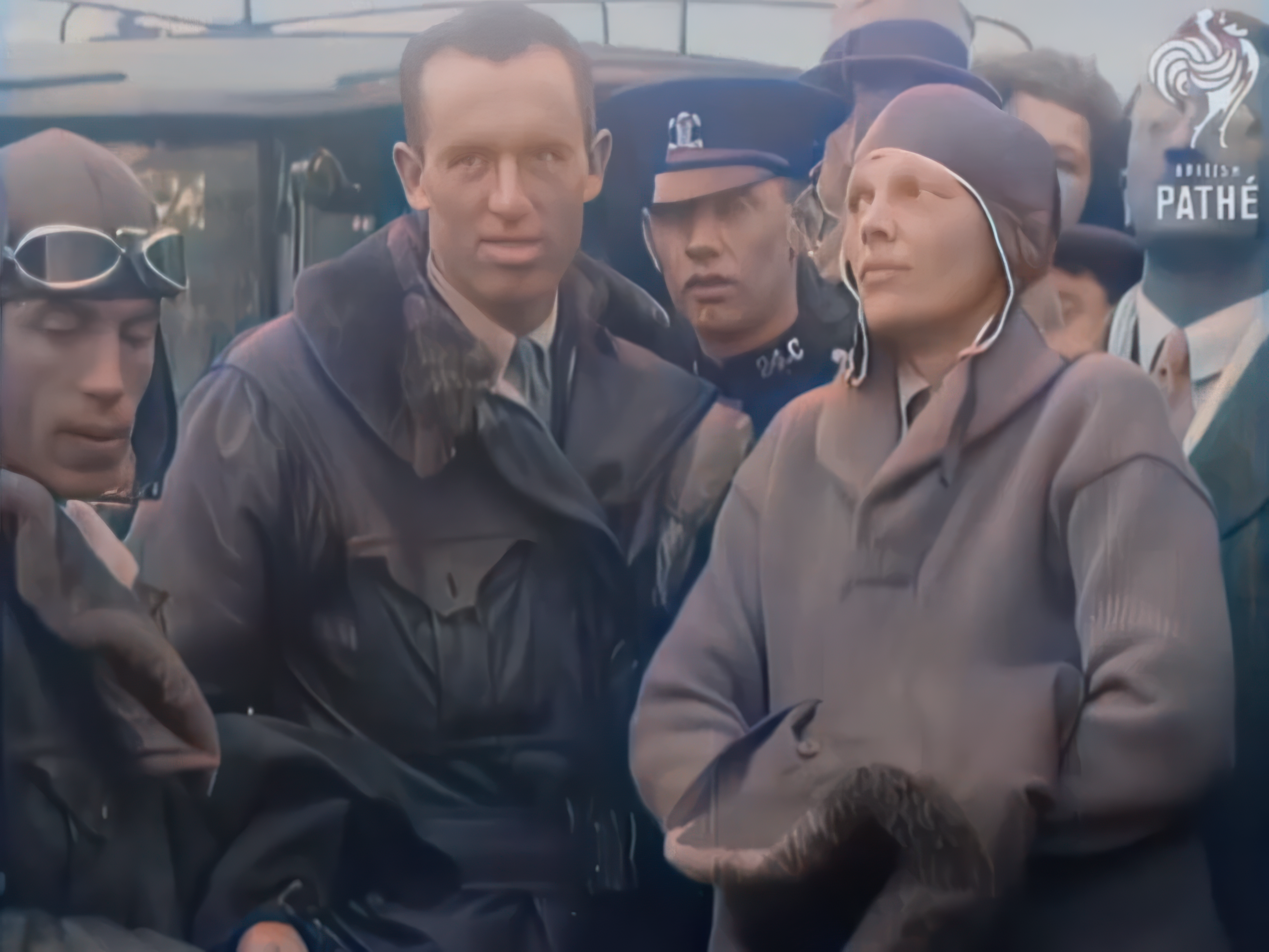
The Friendship crew members at Burry Port.

The Friendship departed Burry Port Harbour at approximately 11 am. on the 19th of June 1928, beginning the final leg of its journey to Southampton, but not without a final moment of drama. Among the spectators that morning was Sir Arthur Whitten Brown, who—alongside John Alcock—had completed the first non-stop transatlantic flight in 1919. Living in nearby Swansea, Whitten Brown had travelled to Burry Port with his family to congratulate Earhart and present her with a bouquet of flowers. A boat was dispatched to carry him out to the Friendship, but unaware of his approach, the crew had already begun their departure. As a result, a potentially historic meeting between the first man and the first woman to cross the Atlantic nonstop by air was narrowly missed.

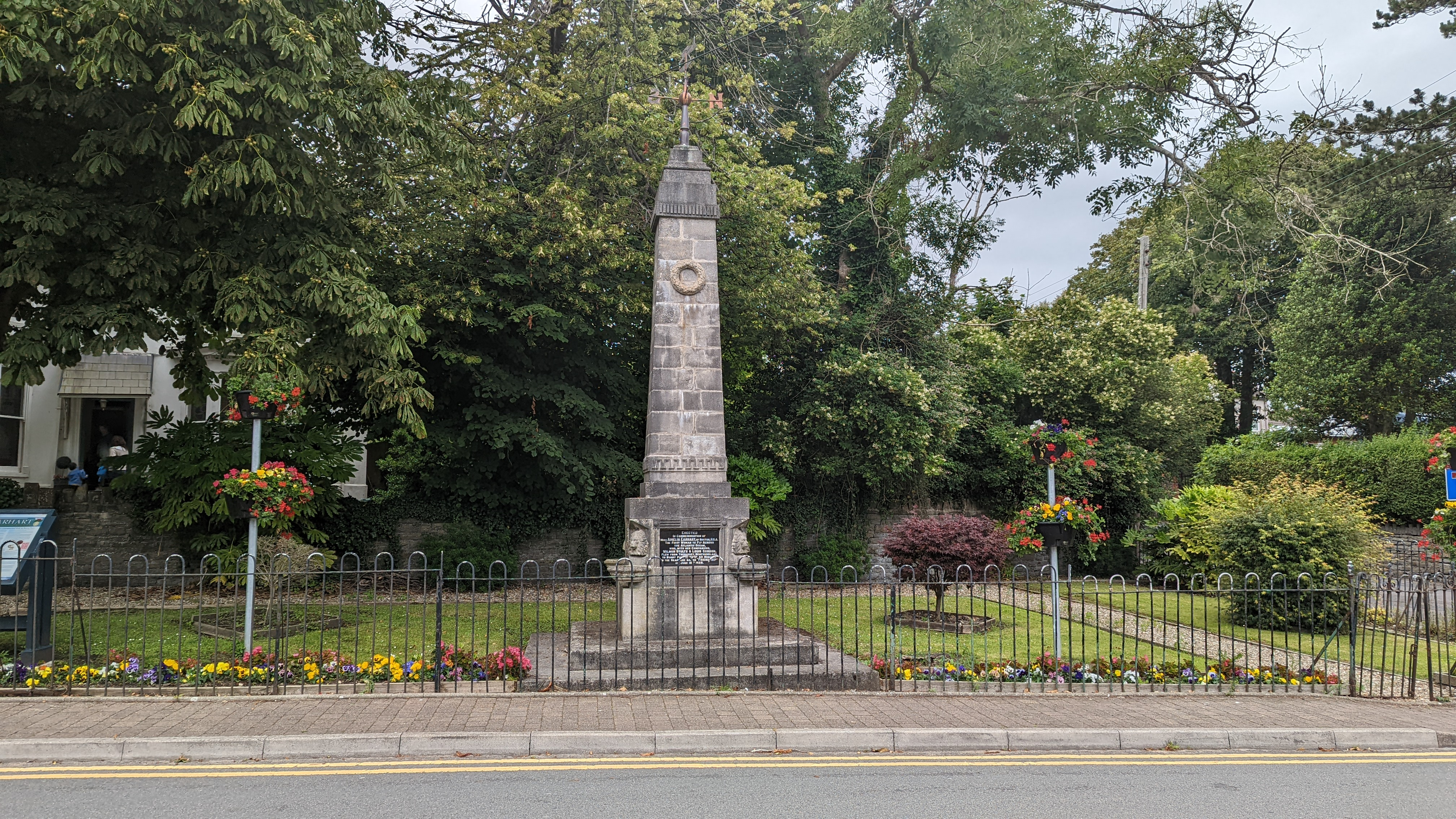
The Amelia Earhart Monument, Burry Port.

On August the 8th 1930, a monument commemorating the events of June the 18th 1928 was unveiled by Sir Arthur Whitten Brown. The monument consists of a stone column with water fountains at each corner, surmounted by a weathervane in the shape of Friendship. The inscription on the monument reads- " ERECTED In commemoration of Miss Amelia Earhart, of Boston, USA. The first woman to fly across the Atlantic ocean, who, with her companions Wilmur (sic) Stultz & Louis Gordon, flew from Trepassey, Newfoundland in 20 hours and 49 minutes in the seaplane "Friendship" on June 18th 1928."

== Transport ==
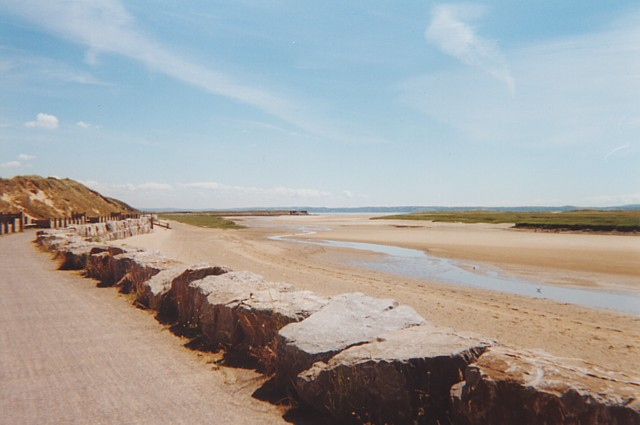
The Millennium Coastal Path near Burry Port.

- Burry Port is connected to Llanelli and Carmarthen by the A484 road.
- There are regular local buses running through Burry Port, linking it with Carmarthen, Llanelli and Swansea, with a main stop across the railway bridge from the Co-operative store. However, evening and Sunday services were withdrawn in July 2014.
- Pembrey & Burry Port railway station is on the West Wales Line. Westbound services from Burry Port terminate at Carmarthen or Pembroke Dock, with less frequent direct services to Fishguard and Milford Haven. Eastbound services terminate at Swansea, or run through to Manchester via Cardiff with less frequent direct services to London Paddington. Train services operate seven days a week, including evenings. Between 1909 and 1953 Burry Port station served the town on the Burry Port and Gwendraeth Valley Railway. Following the removal of GWR station staff in the 1950s a ticket agency was set up on the Up platform. This was for some 50 years known as Pembrey Travel. For some 22 years the Proprietor was Emyr Phillips, a lifelong rail enthusiast. Many of the popular railway destinations tickets were sold by way of Edmondson tickets. These were the original rectangular card tickets devised by Thomas Edmondson in Carlisle. With the introduction of the new computerised ticketing system the national demise of the Edmondson Tickets came about on 4 February 1990. The location for the last ever Edmondson Ticket to be sold in Britain was here at Pembrey Travel in Burry Port, while Emyr Phillips was still the Proprietor of Pembrey Travel.
- Burry Port is connected to the Millennium Coastal Park, which includes a 22-km pedestrian walkway and cycle-way along the south coast of Carmarthenshire, providing a link between Bynea, Llanelli and Pembrey Country Park. The cycle-way forms a section of both the Celtic Trail cycle route (part of NCR 47) and the National Cycle Network NCR 4.
- Pembrey Airport is a commercial airfield for private and charter flights, a few miles west of Burry Port. The nearest regional airport with domestic and scheduled flights is Cardiff Airport.

== Burry Port tidal range ==
The current sea-level depths in the shipping year at Burry Port are these:

Tide	Height
Mean High Water Springs (MHWS)	8.6 metres (28 ft)
Mean High Water Neaps (MHWN)	6.6 metres (22 ft)
Mean Low Water Neaps (MLWN)	3.0 metres (9.8 ft)
Mean Low Water Springs (MLWS)	1.1 metres (3 ft 7 in)

== Notable people ==
See Category:People from Burry Port

In birth order:

- Sarah Thomas (1788–1897), Welsh centenarian
- John Henry Williams (1869–1936), doctor and politician; lived and worked in Burry Port
- David Thomas (1880–1967), Labour organiser, adult education tutor and writer, who died in Burry Port
- Linford Rees (1914–2004), psychiatrist
- John Geoffrey Jones (1928–2014), British judge, president of the Mental Health Review Tribunal for England and Wales
- John Gray (1936–2003), senior UK diplomat
- Leslie Griffiths (born 1942), Methodist minister and Labour life peer - Baron Griffiths of Burry Port
- John Owen-Jones (born 1971), musical theatre actor known for his portrayal of The Phantom in The Phantom of the Opera

=== Sport ===
- Howard Davies (1916–1987), Welsh International rugby union player
- John Warlow (born 1939), Welsh rugby union and league international, Great Britain rugby league international
- Gareth Jenkins (born 1951), rugby player and long-time coach for Llanelli RFC, the Scarlets; Welsh National Coach 2006–2007
- Mark Perego (born 1964), Welsh international rugby union player
- Darren Daniel (born 1986), rugby player
- Adam Warren (born 1991), rugby union Welsh international playing for Dragons
- Kirby Myhill (born 1992), rugby player for Cardiff Blues
- Torin Myhill (born 1995), rugby player for Carmarthen Quins
