= Pembrey and Burry Port railway station =

Railway station in Carmarthenshire, Wales

Pembrey and Burry Port Welsh: Pen-bre a Phorth Tywyn
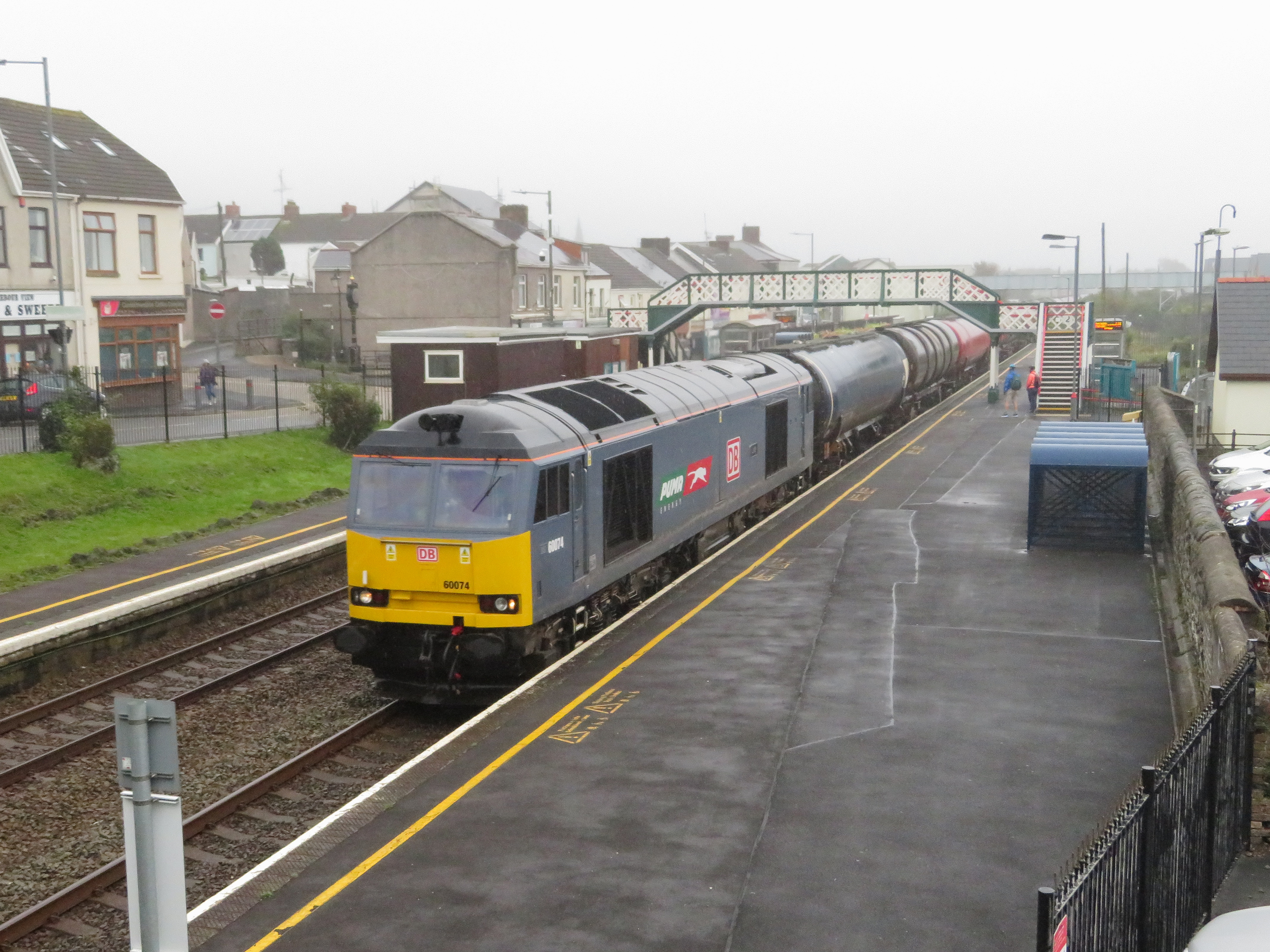

General information
- Location: Burry Port, Carmarthenshire; Wales
- Coordinates: 51.684°N 4.248°W
- Grid reference: SN447007
- Manager: Transport for Wales
- Platforms: 2

Other information
- Station code: PBY
- Classification: DfT category F1

Passengers
- 2020/21: ▼22,244
- 2021/22: ▲76,404
- 2022/23: ▲92,070
- 2023/24: ▲0.110 million
- 2024/25: ▲0.131 million
Location
Notes
- Passenger statistics from the Office of Rail and Road

Pembrey and Burry Port railway station is a railway station on the West Wales line serving Pembrey and Burry Port, in Carmarthenshire, Wales. It is adjacent to Burry Port's main shopping area. Pembrey is situated 1.2 miles (2 km) to the west. The station is 229 miles 15 chains (368.8 km) from the zero point at London Paddington, measured via Stroud.

== History ==
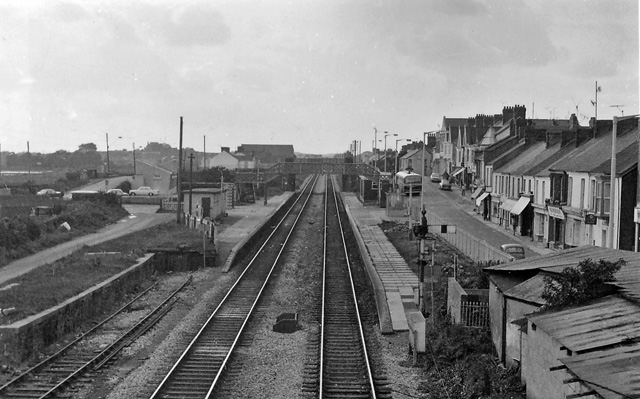
View westward, towards Carmarthen in 1973

It was opened by the broad gauge South Wales Railway on 11 October 1852 when that company extended its route from Landore (Swansea) to Carmarthen.

The South Wales Railway amalgamated with the Great Western Railway in 1863 and the broad gauge was replaced by standard gauge in 1872.

Train movements are controlled from a Great Western Railway signal box opened in 1907.

In 2012, Network Rail had threatened to remove the Victorian bridge due to its poor state of repair. However, a local campaign to save the bridge was successful. In January 2020, the footbridge was removed to be refurbished. It was strengthened, decorated and had a new decking added, before being reinstalled. It followed work in 2013 to add lighting to the bridge.

== Services ==
There is an hourly service to Manchester Piccadilly via Swansea, Cardiff Central, Shrewsbury and Crewe. A similar frequency operates on Sundays, but trains do not start running until late morning. In the other direction there is an hourly service to Carmarthen, running either non-stop or stopping at Kidwelly and Ferryside, with a two-hourly extension to Milford Haven via Whitland and Haverfordwest. There are also several daily services between Pembroke Dock and Swansea via Carmarthen and two through trains to Fishguard Harbour. All of these services are operated by Transport for Wales.

Great Western Railway operate six daily services each way between Carmarthen and London Paddington. This saves having to travel to Swansea and change trains. On summer Saturdays an extra service runs through to Pembroke Dock. This service departs London Paddington at 08:45 and arrives at Pembroke Dock at 14:14. On Sundays, a more frequent service operates (three trains each way from early afternoon).

Preceding station	National Rail	Following station
Llanelli	Transport for Wales; West Wales Line	Kidwelly or Carmarthen
Llanelli	Great Western Railway; London–Carmarthen	Carmarthen

== Bibliography ==
- Marshall, Geoff; Pipe, Vicki (2018). The Railway Adventures: Places, Trains, People and Stations. September Publishing. ISBN 978-1910463871.
