= Pembrey Sands Air Weapons Range =

Ministry of Defence facility in Wales

Pembery Sands Air Weapons Range
- Near Pembrey, Carmarthenshire in Wales
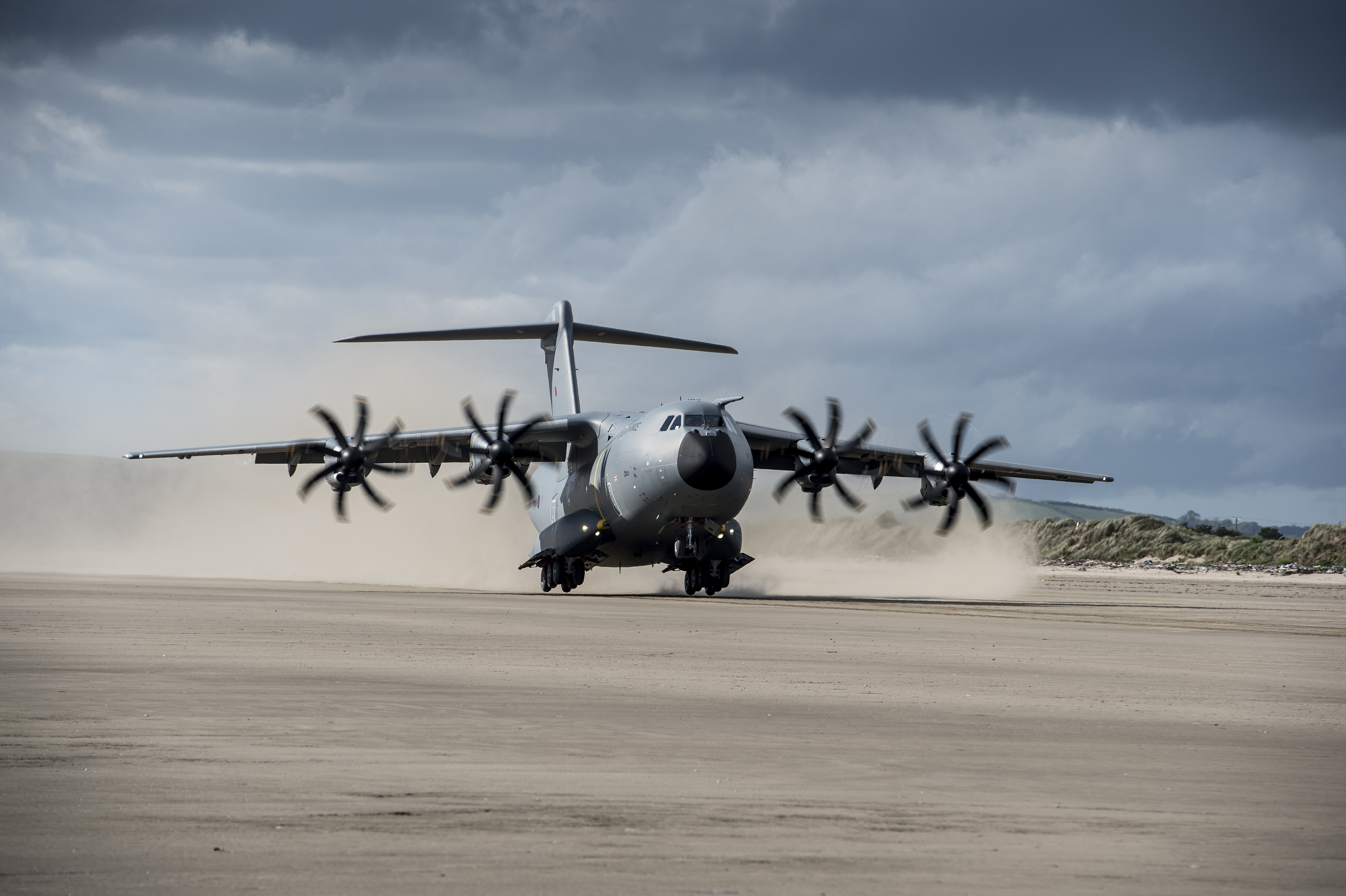
- An RAF Atlas C1 carrying out trials on the beach at Pembrey Sands AWR

Site information
- Type: Air weapons range
- Owner: Ministry of Defence
- Operator: Defence Infrastructure Organisation
- Controlled by: Defence Training Estate
- Open to the public: Yes, unless red warning flags or red lights are shown
- Condition: Operational
- No. of targets: Four
- Website: GOV.UK (Air weapons ranges activity times)

Location
- Location in the Carmarthenshire Pembrey Sands AWR (the United Kingdom)
- Coordinates: 51°42′52″N 4°22′01.3″W
- Area: 1,112 hectares (11 km^{2}; 4 sq mi)

Site history
- In use: 1937–1957 (airfield); 1964–present (weapons range)

Garrison information
- Designations: Site of Special Scientific Interest; Special Area of Conservation

Airfield information
Runways
| Direction | Length and surface |
|---|---|
| N/A (beach) | Sand (temporary landing zone) |

Pembrey Sands Air Weapons Range is a Ministry of Defence air weapons range located near the village of Pembrey, Carmarthenshire, 3 miles (4.8 km) northwest of Burry Port and 10.3 miles (16.6 km) south of Carmarthen, Wales. Adjacent to the weapons range site is a former Royal Air Force station known as Royal Air Force Pembrey, or more simply RAF Pembrey, which closed in 1957 and of which part is now in civilian use as Pembrey Airport.

== History ==
=== RAF Pembrey ===
==== RAF Training Command ====
The site for Pembrey was acquired in 1937. The airfield was allocated to No. 25 Group RAF, of RAF Training Command during its construction, and it officially opened on the 6 May 1940. The site was known as Towyn Burrows and was only just higher than the high tide level. Situated between Burry Port and Kidwelly, it was on a marshy area of coastline, the Cefn Sidan Sands and Pembrey Forest were between the shoreline and the airfield.

The airfield opened in March 1939, and by September 1939 No. 2 Air Armament School RAF was the first unit to be stationed at the airfield, indeed, from September 1939 to June 1940 the airfield was used to train armourers and air mechanics by No. 2 AAS.

==== RAF Fighter Command ====
From the 20 June 1940, the airfield was transferred to No. 10 Group RAF of RAF Fighter Command. Pembrey was used throughout the Battle of Britain to rest squadrons from the defending against the Blitz, and also to provide air defence for South Wales and to protect convoys.

Supermarine Spitfire pilots of No. 92 Squadron used Pembrey as their base from the 18 June 1940. These included Squadron Leader Stanford Tuck, until 12 August, Geoffrey Wellum, the author of the 2002 memoir "First Light", and Tony Bartley. During the Battle of Britain, No. 92 Squadron pilots who were to be at readiness at dawn, spent the night in a tent set up near the aircraft. No. 92 Squadron returned to RAF Biggin Hill on the 9 September, during the air battle’s peak.

From January to March 1941, 256 Squadron operated from Pembrey. In early 1941, No. 316 Polish Fighter Squadron was formed at Pembrey, inflicted losses on enemy aircraft, and moved on to RAF Colerne in June.

RAF Fairwood Common and RAF Angle had taken over the air defence of the South Wales area by the middle of 1941 and RAF Pembrey was allocated to RAF Flying Training Command.

==== RAF Flying Training Command ====
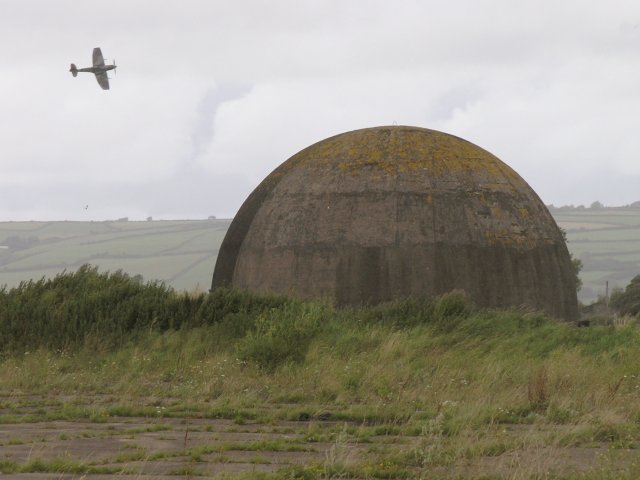
Disused dome training facility and Spitfire, 2007

Between 1941 and 1945 Pembrey was host to the RAF's No. 1 Air Gunners School, involving Bristol Blenheim and Vickers Wellington bombers and Spitfire fighter aircraft, and included experimental courses. From 1943 to 1945, Wing commander George Peter Macdonald, was the commanding officer of No. 1 Air Gunners School RAF, and the Station Commander of RAF Pembrey.

==== Operational Conversion Unit ====
No 233 OCU formed in September 1952, at RAF Pembrey. The OCU's Badge featured the head of a Wildcat, indicative of the fierce fighting spirit. The OCU's Welsh motto was Ymlaen; The English translation is 'Forward'.

The OCUs de Havilland Vampire aircraft displayed the badge below the front quarter-light of the cockpit and was the OCUs aircraft's only markings. The Station badge was also the No 233 OCU badge during this period, and was displayed on all the RAF Pembrey vehicles.

The Operational Conversion Unit disbanded in September 1957 and the station closed soon afterwards.

=== Incidents ===
- In June 1942, a Luftwaffe Focke-Wulf Fw 190 fighter aircraft landed at RAF Pembrey in error, after a dog fight over the Bristol Channel. Oberleutnant Armin Faber, adjutant of III. fighter Gruppe of JG2, had been engaged by Supermarine Spitfire aircraft of No. 19 Squadron RAF and the Czech Wing, over south Devon, England, on 23 June. Being forced north beyond Exeter, Faber mistook the Bristol Channel for the English Channel. Short on fuel, he landed at Pembrey, believing it to be a Luftwaffe airfield in the Cotentin Peninsula, Normandy, France. The Pembrey Duty Pilot grabbed a Very pistol, ran from the control tower, and jumped onto the wing of Faber's aircraft as it taxied. Faber was taken to RAF Fairwood Common by Group Captain David Atcherley for interrogation. Faber was piloting the latest Luftwaffe fighter aircraft, the Focke-Wulf Fw 190A-3, a type the RAF had only seen flying over France. The depths of Faber's despair at providing his enemy with an intact Focke-Wulf Fw 190 can be gauged by the fact that he subsequently attempted to commit suicide. As news broke of his landing in Pembrey, RAF Fighter Command dispatched pilots to photograph and move the aircraft to the Royal Aircraft Establishment at Farnborough. The RAF finally had an Focke-Wulf Fw 190 to compare with its V.S Spitfire IX and Hawker Typhoon Ia aircraft.
- In September 1953, a de Havilland Vampire crashed at the airfield, killing the pilot, Squadron Leader Lionel Hubert Wakeford, DFC. Shortly before closure in June 1957, a Hawker Hunter I, (WT563), crashed on approach to the airfield, killing Pilot Officer Frederick William Rupert Vernon Jacques when he ejected at low level; the aircraft crashed into Kidwelly railway station. Both airmen were buried in St Illtyd Churchyard, Pembrey, along with 32 wartime RAF casualties, including seven from the Polish Air Force.
- In 1968, a bomb exploded at the airfield, seriously injuring a warrant officer; in the "climate of sporadic bomb threats" the BBC interviewed people in Kidwelly about whether they believed the Prince of Wales should come to Wales.

=== Pembrey Airport ===
On 22 August 1997 Pembrey was officially opened as a civil airfield and named Pembrey Airport. Pembrey was associated as a service facility with the former RAF Pembrey Sands Air Weapons Range, a Defence Infrastructure Organisation (DIO) establishment. The airfield is now split into a number of facilities: the Welsh Motor Sports Centre occupies most of the area, part of the land has reverted to agriculture, part contains a hangar formerly used by the Dyfed-Powys Police Air Support, whilst 805 metres (2,641 ft) of the north east portion of the former RAF Runway, 04/22, was opened as Pembrey West Wales Airport in August 1997. In 2009 it was expecting to operate charter flights into the airport. The airfield is also home to the Llanelli Model Flying Club.

== Former units ==
Former squadrons include:

- Nos 595/5, 92, 118 (Spitfires)
- Nos 32, 79, 316 – formed at Pembrey. (Hurricanes)
- Nos 238, 248. (Beaufighters)
- Nos 256, 307. (Boulton Paul Defiants)
- No. 233 OCU (Vampires, Tempests, Mosquitos, Meteors and Hunters)

Other former units include:

- No. 1 Bombing and Gunnery School RAF
- No. 14 Operational Training Unit RAF
- No. 41 Gliding School RAF
- No. 225 Squadron RAF
- No. 2742 Squadron RAF Regiment
- No. 2875 Squadron RAF Regiment
- Air Sea Rescue Flight RAF, Pembrey/Fairwood Common (1941) became 'D' Flight, No. 276 Squadron RAF
- Pembrey Station Flight

== Current operations ==
=== Pembrey Sands Air Weapons Range ===
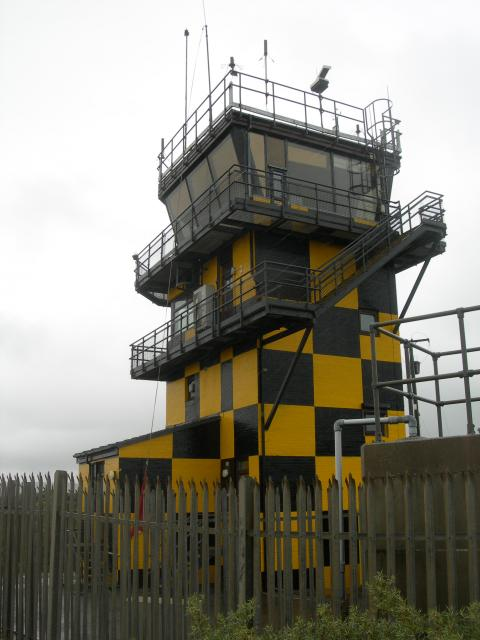
No1 Quadrant Control Tower at Pembrey Sands AWR

Pembrey Sands Air weapons range is an air-to-ground bombing and strafing practice area. It also has a unique feature in that it can provide a beach environment to enable crews to establish a Temporary Landing Zone, to practise natural surface operations. A control tower and beach guard boxes are staffed to ensure the general public do not enter the Air Weapons Range. Accommodation and kitchen facilities are available. One hour after low tide, landings can take place day or night, meaning training can take place in the dark. Lockheed C-130 Hercules aircraft regularly used the airstrip. The first test sand landing of an Airbus A400M Atlas has been completed.

The facility has four Air Weapons Range targets; three are bombing targets and are used for both low-level attacks and dive-bombing. The fourth target is a strafe target, consisting of three strafe panels. Forward Air Control and Close Air Defence units use Pembrey AWR for realistic training. The range can also support Dry Training.

== See also ==
- Pembrey Circuit a motor racing circuit on part of the former RAF airfield at Pembrey.
- Court Farm, Pembrey
- List of former Royal Air Force stations
- List of Battle of Britain airfields
- List of Royal Air Force aircraft squadrons
- List of conversion units of the Royal Air Force
- Castlemartin Training Area, a direct-fire Armoured fighting vehicle (AFV) live gunnery range, part of Defence Training Estate Pembrokeshire.
- RAF Manorbier, Air Defence Range (ADR) Manorbier, a missile range, part of Defence Training Estate Pembrokeshire.
- RAF Templeton, Templeton Dry Training Area, part of Defence Training Estate Pembrokeshire.
