= Bombing range =

Military facility for testing ordinance and explosives

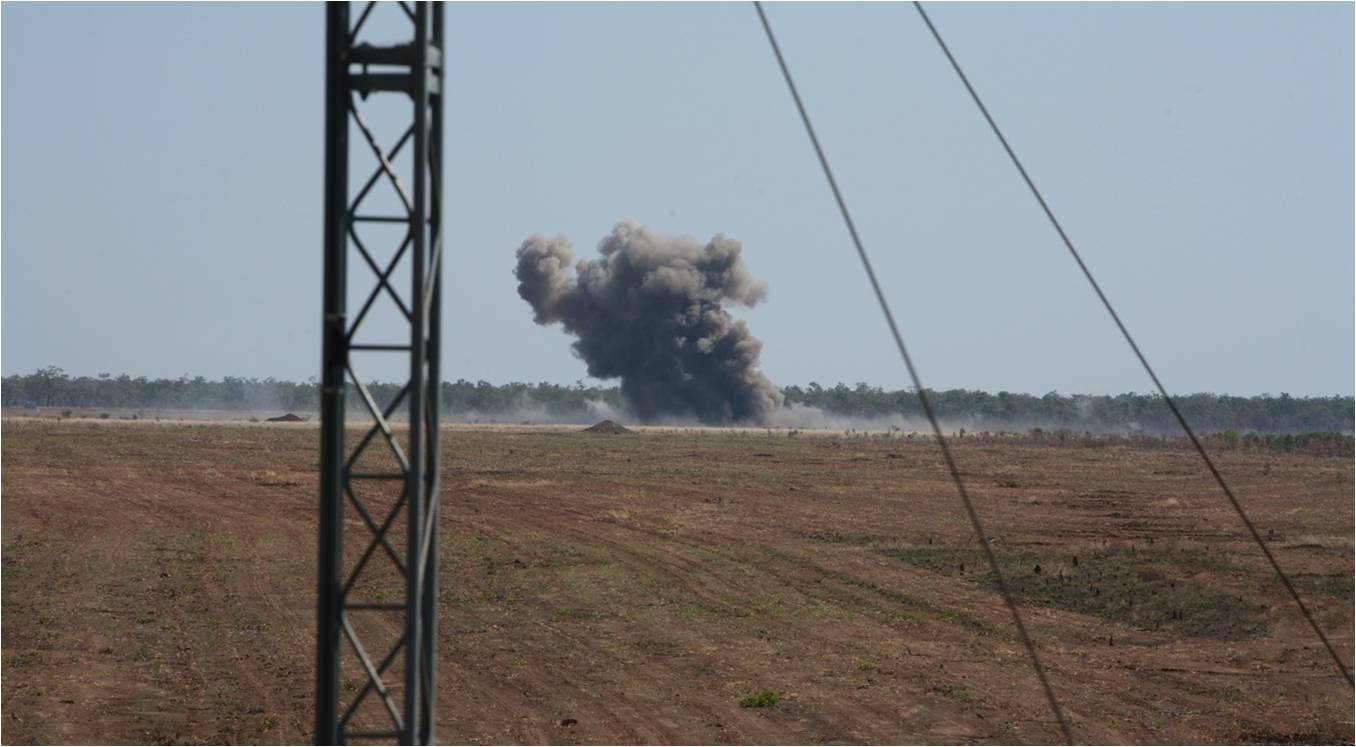
Delamere Air Weapons Range in Australia: bomb deployed from an F/A-18 Hornet aircraft explodes in the distance during a training exercise

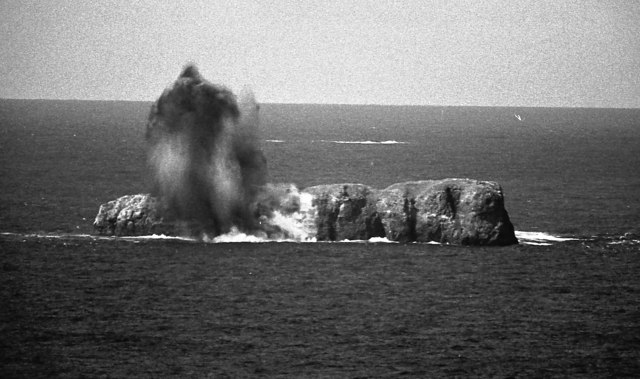
A 1,000 pound bomb hitting a small island being used as a bomb target

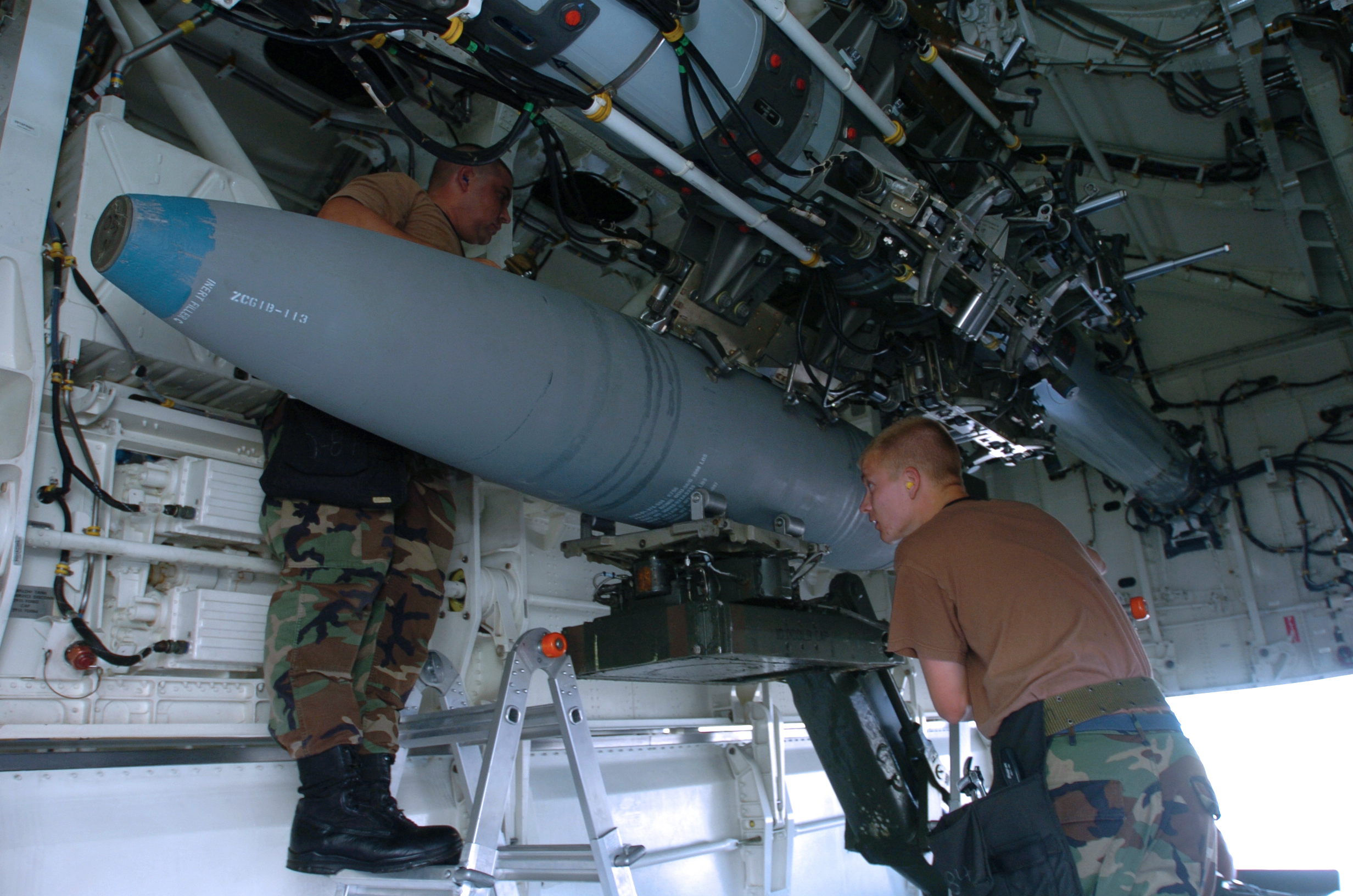
A BDU-56 non-explosive practice bomb being loaded to a B-2 bomber; the BDU-56 simulates the 2000lb Mark 84 bomb

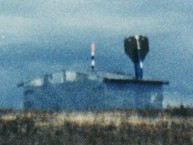
A JDAM bomb being tested on a bombing range at Eglin Air Force Base, 10 February 1993

A bombing range, sometimes referred to as an air weapons range (AWR), is a remote military facility used by combat aircraft for air-to-ground weapons training, as well as for the research, development, testing, and evaluation of aerial ordnance. These ranges support precision targeting with high-explosive aerial bombs, precision-guided munitions, rockets, missiles, and other aircraft-delivered weapons, in contrast to field firing ranges used by infantry and armored units.

To minimise environmental impact and infrastructure damage, various inert "practice bombs" are extensively used to simulate explosive ordnance during precision targeting exercises. In addition, solid target practice (TP) ammunition is employed during strafing runs, offering ballistic realism without explosive payloads, unlike high-explosive (HE) or armour-piercing (AP) variants which contain energetic fillers or penetrators designed for destructive effect.

== United Kingdom ==
The Defence Training Estate of the UK Ministry of Defence currently runs five Air Weapons Ranges for military operational training: RAF Holbeach and RAF Donna Nook in Lincolnshire (England), RAF Pembrey in Carmarthenshire (Wales), RAF Tain in Rossshire and Cape Wrath in Sutherland (Scotland). A former air weapons range RAF Wainfleet in Lincolnshire was decommissioned in 2009. It had been in use since 1890 for artillery training by the 1st Lincolnshire Artillery Volunteers.

== Hazards ==
Bombing ranges pose several hazards, even when not in use or closed. Unexploded ordnance is often the biggest threat. Once a bombing range has been permanently closed, they are sometimes cleared of unexploded ordnance so that the land can be put to other use or to reduce the chance of accidental detonation causing harm to people near the range, trespassers or authorized personnel. Cleanup or complete cleanup may be put off indefinitely depending on the cost, the danger to personnel clearing the area, the land's potential use, the likelihood of an explosion being triggered and the probability of someone being around to trigger or be harmed by an explosion.

The wreckage can also be hazardous. Bomb fragments and other wreckage can cause lacerations and puncture wounds if not removed before the land is put to other uses, such as farming or recreation, or if it is handled by curious trespassers or untrained scrap metal salvagers. The fragments, wreckage and residues may also contain toxic substances, such as nitrate. Exposure can come from direct contact, but it can also come offsite by the air, from surface or groundwater contamination, or by the uptake of toxins by plants and animals consumed by humans. Which route of exposure is most likely depends on the type of substances present, the proximity of inhabited areas and whether unauthorized personnel trespass on the range. Developing nations and those in an economic crisis often have a haphazard salvage industry involved in legal and illegal activities. In these areas, bombing ranges are scoured for salvageable metals. Unusual items, sometimes the most dangerous, are made into "trinkets". The danger is greatly increased when the materials are melted down or worked by hand, exposing workers to toxic fumes.

== See also ==
- Nevada Test and Training Range
- Chocolate Mountain Aerial Gunnery Range
- Barry M. Goldwater Air Force Range
- Tactical bombing
