= Templeton, Pembrokeshire =

Village and community in Pembrokeshire, Wales

Templeton: Welsh: Tredeml
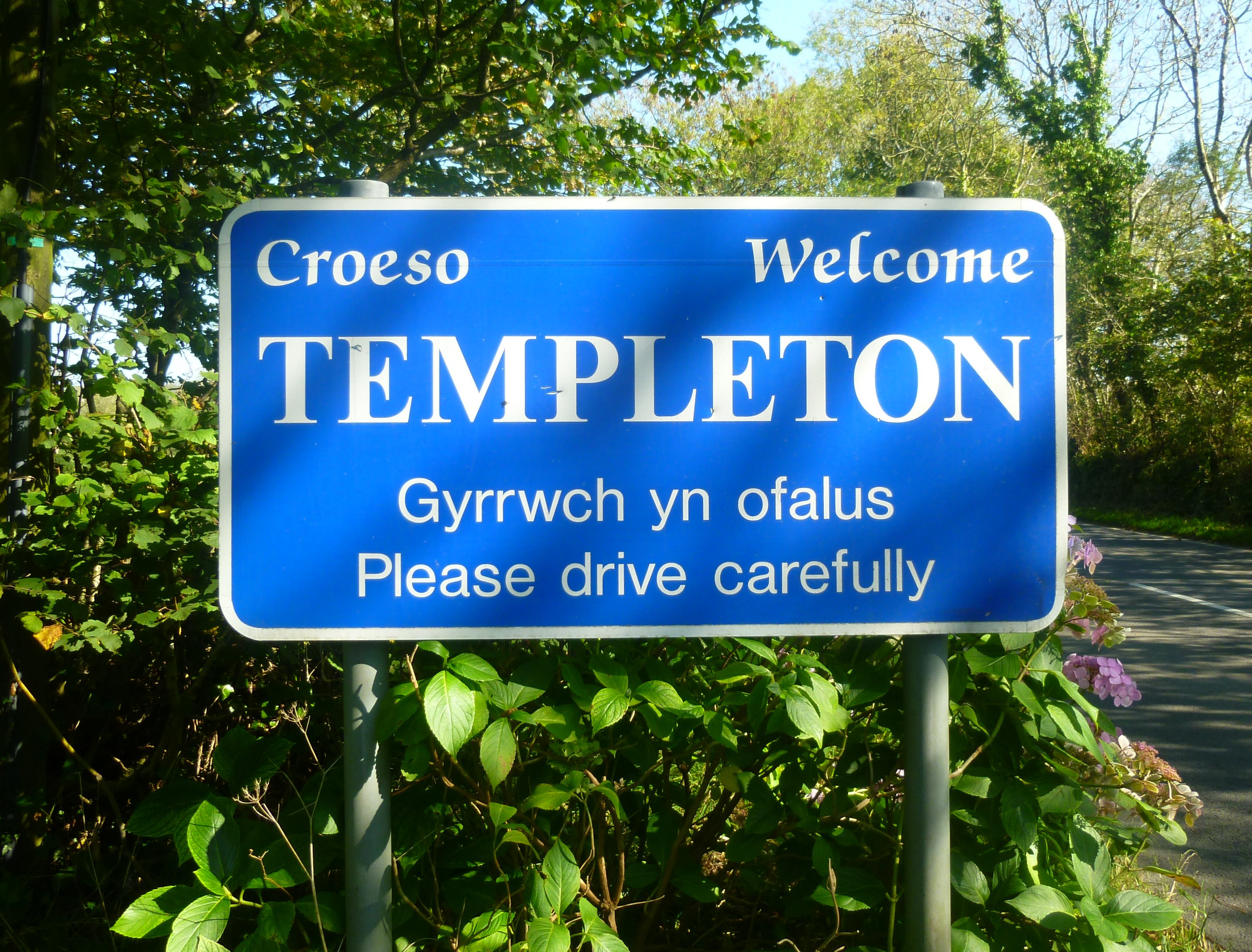

- Location within Pembrokeshire
- Population: 943
- OS grid reference: SN112119
- Principal area: Pembrokeshire
- Country: Wales
- Sovereign state: United Kingdom
- Post town: NARBERTH
- Postcode district: SA67
- Police: Dyfed-Powys
- Fire: Mid and West Wales
- Ambulance: Welsh
- Senedd Cymru – Welsh Parliament: Ceredigion Penfro
- List of places UK Wales Pembrokeshire 51.77434°N 4.73701°W Map of the community

Templeton (Welsh: Tredeml) is a village and community in Pembrokeshire, Wales. The population of the community was 943 in 2011. The built-up area had a population of 627.

== History ==
=== Early history ===
The placename Templeton may derive from “The Templar's Farm” or (“Tun”). It is possible that the Knights Templar had some form of religious house here before their possessions were taken over by the Knights Hospitallers, which had a commandery at nearby Slebech, which, by 1282 passed to the Mortimers, Lords of Narberth.

In 1282 Templeton was referred to as "Villa temparil" which means the “Vil” or settlement of the Templars and "Villa Templarorium Campestris" – the vil of the Templars in the fields. In 1283 there was also a reference to “Burgesses”. These burgesses were "de vento" - "of the wind" meaning they were not property owners within the settlement but were permitted to come in and out of trade on a regular basis. Burgesses at Templeton are again recorded in the 16th century.

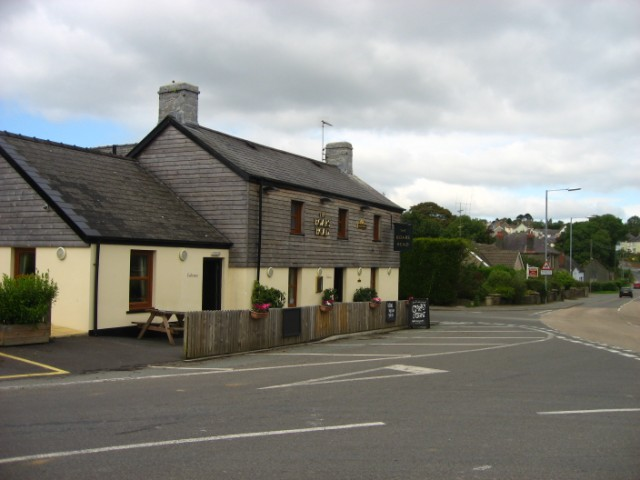
The Boars Head pub

The layout of the present village is an example of deliberate planning in the Middle Ages, with a single main street fronted by houses with their respected plots extending behind each dwelling. These houses and plots, the "burgages" of the Middle Ages, form a coherent unit imposed on the landscape and set in a regular system of fields, which themselves still show the narrow strips representing recent enclosures from an extensive medieval "open field" agricultural field system.

It is not certain that the Templars were responsible for creating the planned settlement. It is possible that this was done by Mortimer incorporating an earlier agricultural holding or farm established by the Templars. It was once a marcher borough. Owen, in 1603, described it as one of nine Pembrokeshire "boroughs in decay".

In the 17th century Narberth Mountain was stocked with Red Deer and covered 873 acres (3.53 km^{2}) of woodland. The Pembrokeshire county history records also show open fields in Molleston and Templeton being enclosed for pasture. The establishment of the Tavernspite Turnpike Trust in the 1770s led to a turnpike road toll gate being built at Catershook to the south of the village; its position on an important trading route from Tenby to Cardigan undoubtedly contributed to the growth of Templeton. In the late 18th century the countryside continued to change with woodland disappearing, more land being enclosed and farming dominating the landscape.

The 1870 Imperial Gazetteer of England and Wales described Templeton as "a chapelry, with a village, in Narberth parish, Pembroke; 5 miles SSW of Narberth-Road r. station. It was constituted in 1863: and it has a post-office under Narberth. Pop., 650. A property here belonged to the Knights Templars. The living is a p. curacy in the diocese of St. Davids. Value, £182. Patron, the Crown. The church was built in 1862. There is a dissenting chapel." The community (and pre-1974 civil parish) covering Templeton was formerly called Narberth South, being renamed Templeton in 1986.

=== Sentence Castle ===
Sentence Castle is a raised fortification, a "ringwork", thought to date from the 12th century. This was probably the castle of arberth which was attacked and destroyed by Gruffydd ap Rhys in 1116, according to a chronicle in the Cotton library; the stone castle at Narberth was not built until over 100 years later.

Legends as recorded in the 13th century Third Branch of the Mabinogi (concerning Manawydan fab Llŷr) mention the area of Arberth and a place called Gorsedd Arberth, thought by some authorities to be Sentence Castle. The embanked earthworks are about 15m across and the site is a Scheduled monument.

=== Margaret's Well ===
Located adjacent to Sentence Castle is one of the 'Holy Wells of Wales', known as Margaret's Well. Set into a bank, the well chamber is lined with stone and has a corbelled roof.

=== Templeton Airfield ===
Opened in 1943, RAF Templeton had three concrete runways and was originally a base for 306 Ferry Training Unit which used twin engined Bristol Beaufort torpedo bomber aircraft. Templeton was also used by 595 Squadron target towing Spitfires, as well as Spitfires and Mosquito bombers of A Flight, No. 8 Operational Training Unit in 1945, when operations moved to RAF Benson and the airfield closed.

The disused runways are now occasionally used for military exercises and low flying training with Hercules transport aircraft.

Some sources (including the UK Ordnance Survey) place the 1081 Battle of Mynydd Carn within the boundary of the airfield.

=== Templeton today ===
Templeton's importance declined with the closures of the brickworks and the blacksmith but it remains active with a nineteenth-century pub, the Boars Head, a primary school, church, chapel and park.

The Grove hotel and its restaurants are located to the northwest of the village.

== Transport ==
=== Templeton Railway Station ===
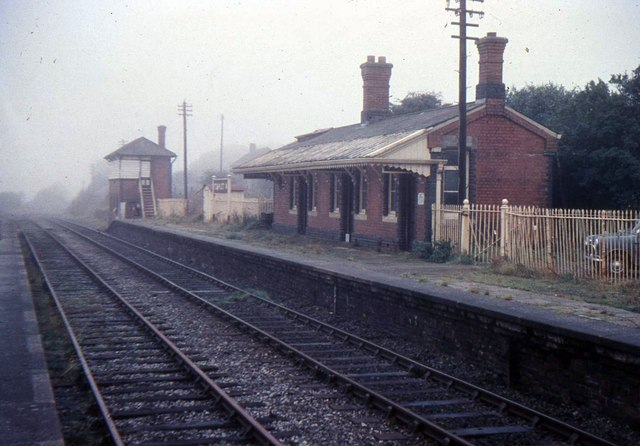
Templeton Station

On 4 September 1866 a railway line was completed to link south Pembrokeshire with the main rail line at Whitland. In Templeton a high limestone bridge was built to span Tanner's Lane and a small station was built in 1867. This was mainly used by the adjacent brickworks until World War I when a new platform was built. There were also extensive sidings that were used twice for overnight stops for the Royal Train. The station was closed on the 16 June 1965 as part of the Beeching cuts and has since been removed.

=== Buses ===
Buses are run by First Cymru to surrounding town’s an villages such as Carmarthen.

== See also ==
- RAF Templeton
