= RAF Templeton =

Ministry of Defence Dry Training Area in Pembrokeshire, Wales

RAF Templeton Templeton Dry Training Area
- Part of Defence Training Estate
- Near Templeton, Pembrokeshire in Wales

Site information
- Type: Royal Air Force station
- Owner: Air Ministry
- Operator: Royal Air Force 1942 - 1945; British Armed Forces
- Controlled by: RAF Coastal Command; *No. 17 (Training) Group RAF; Defence Infrastructure Organisation
- Open to the public: Yes
- Website: GOV.UK (Wales - Public access to military areas)

Location
- Shown within Pembrokeshire RAF Templeton (the United Kingdom)
- Coordinates: 51°45′54″N 004°45′14″W

Site history
- Built: 1942
- In use: 1942-1946 (airfield); 1946 - present (Dry Training Area)
- Battles/wars: European theatre of World War II

Garrison information
- Occupants: 1944; Officers - 47 (3 WAAF); Other Ranks - 806 (131 WAAF)

Airfield information
- Elevation: 105 metres (344 ft) AMSL
Runways
Direction	Length and surface
04/22	1,410 metres (4,626 ft) Concrete
10/28	940 metres (3,084 ft) Concrete
16/34	940 metres (3,084 ft) Concrete

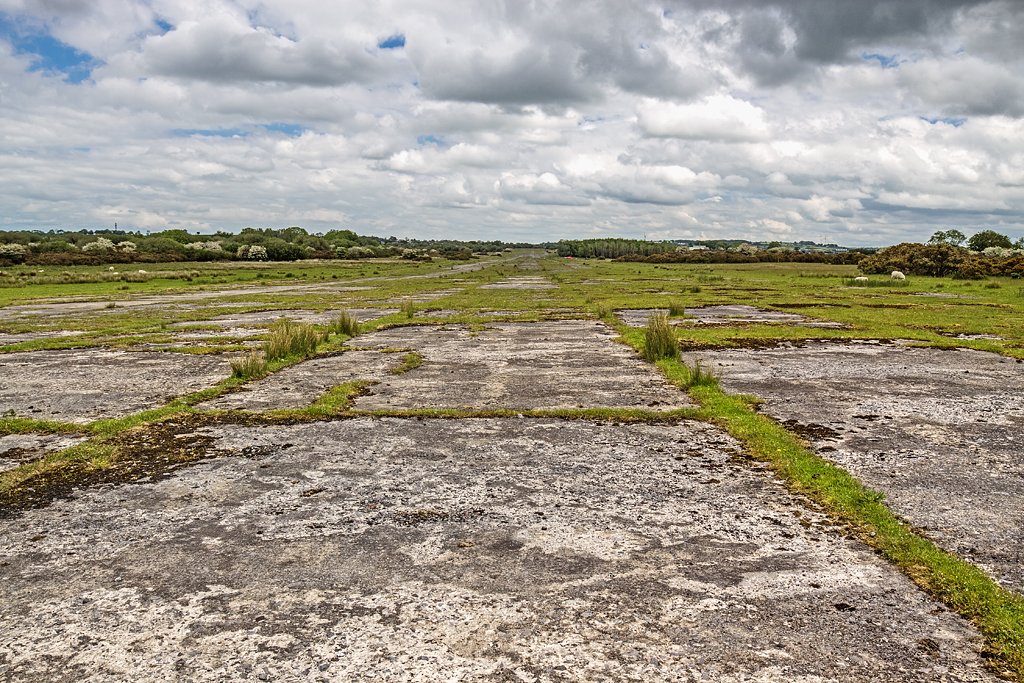
The remains of one of RAF Templeton's runways

Royal Air Force Templeton, or more simply RAF Templeton, is a former Royal Air Force station located 9.75 miles (15.69 km) south east of Haverfordwest, Pembrokeshire and 10 miles (16 km) north east of Pembroke Dock, Pembrokeshire, Wales.

Situated near Templeton, 2 miles (3.2 km) south of Narberth, Pembrokeshire. It was operational between December 1942 and July 1945, as a satellite airfield for RAF Haverfordwest. It remains in use, under Defence Training Estate Pembrokeshire, as Templeton Dry Training Area.

Templeton airfield was constructed during 1942, waste from Reynalton Colliery being utilised in the build, and was officially opened in January 1943. In the middle of the triangular runway layout was a hill limiting all-round vision. This posed a danger to aircraft using the runways. A lookout was regularly posted and used flag signals to warn of aircraft movements.

== History ==
=== Station design ===
Many of the dispersal pans were located to the north and west of the runways. The three runways were constructed of concrete and tarmac: 12/30 1,006 m (3,300 ft) long, 18/36 914 m (3,000 ft) long, and 07/25 1,463 m (4,800 ft) long. The airfield had a single T2 Hangar. Workshops, offices and classrooms were built close by, with a standard RAF Watchtower. The A4115 road ran between these and the airfield’s No. 1 site. Accommodation for the Airmen and WAAF were located in adjoining fields.

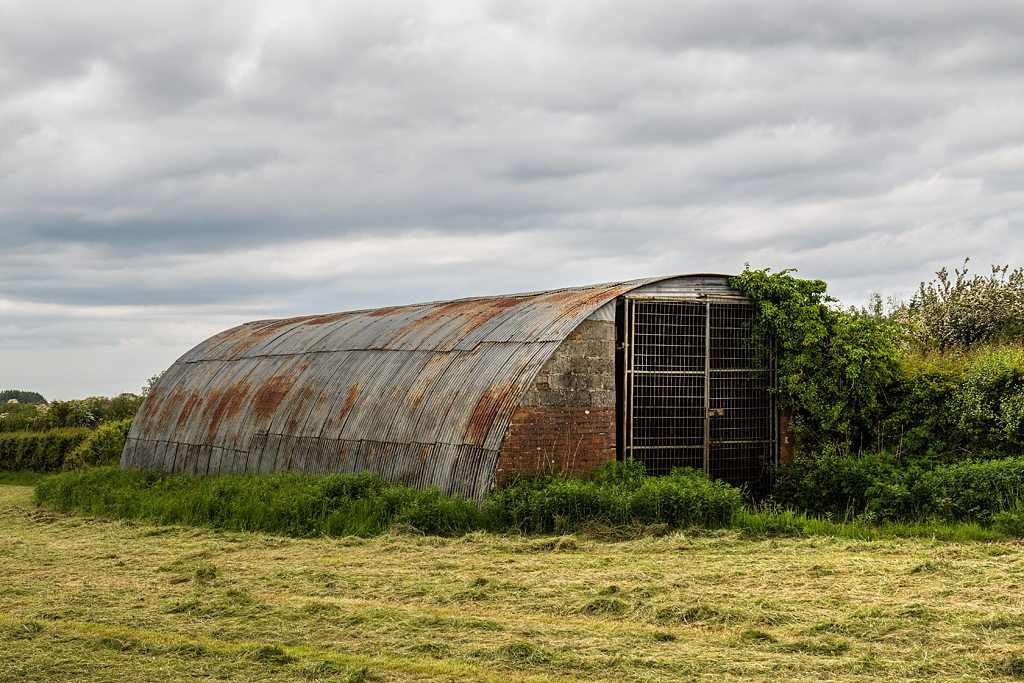
The remains of RAF Templeton's Bomb Fusing Shed

=== RAF Coastal Command ===
RAF Templeton initially formed part of No. 17 Group RAF, the training organisation within RAF Coastal Command, and had a particular role in training for the defence of the oil installations in Milford Haven. No. 306 Ferry Training Unit (Bristol Beaufort) formed at the station in January 1943, later departing to Maghaberry in Northern Ireland. The Observer training flight, "O" Flight, of No. 3 (Coastal) Operational Training Unit RAF (Avro Anson) moved in from nearby Haverfordwest, staying until December 1943.

United States Army Air Forces

From December 1943 to May 1944, the station hosted an American unit, using British-built aircraft, 1st Gunnery and Tow Target Flight, VIII USAAF, (Westland Lysander and Miles Master) towing targets for the fighters at the American training base at RAF Atcham, Shropshire.

During the latter part of 1944, anti-aircraft target-towing Miles Martinets and Supermarine Spitfires of No. 595 Squadron RAF, based at Aberporth, used the airfield. In January 1945, No 8 OTU moved into Haverfordwest, and "A" Flight was detached to Templeton, training aircrew on photo-reconnaissance aircraft including the Supermarine Spitfire and de Havilland Mosquito. They only stayed until March but a small engineering unit remained at Templeton to carry out aircraft repairs. They moved to Benson, Oxfordshire, in June.

In July 1945, the RAF closed RAF Templeton although No 74 Gliding School Air Training Corps continued to use part of the airfield as they had done since 1944.

The Royal Marines took over the camp in 1945 and it was used as a holding camp prior to de-mob for marines from all over the world.

The airfield was sold in 1960. The Ministry of Defence leased it back and is now used militarily as a Dry Training Area for various equipment trials. Not much of the wartime buildings are left and vegetation has taken hold of most of the airfield.

== Royal Air Force operational history ==
=== Ferry Flight Operations ===
==== 306 Ferry Training Unit ====
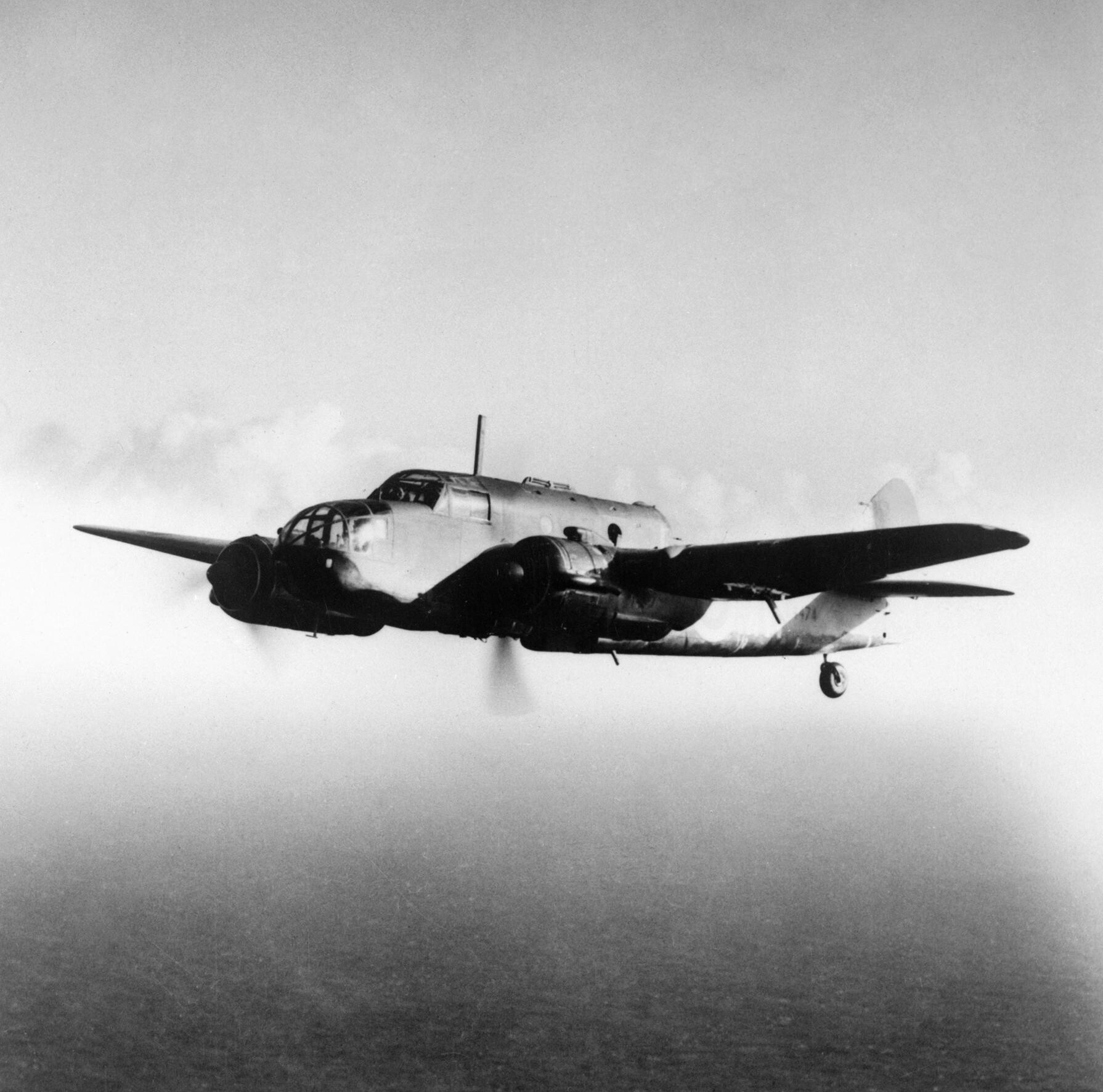
Royal Air Force Coastal Command, Bristol Beaufort Mark I, of the type used by 306 FTU

No. 306 Ferry Training Unit RAF was formed at RAF Templeton on the 31 December 1942. It was equipped with Bristol Beaufort I & IIA, and Bristol Beaufighter X aircraft. In January 1943 it began the training and preparation of aircrew for long distance ferry flights. Aircraft were received during February, March and April. Initially two aircrews were fully trained, and two aircraft successfully flew to RAF Portreath, and then onto Egypt, on the 13 April 1943. The unit operated out of Templeton for around six months and was then transferred to Northern Ireland in June 1943, based at RAF Maghaberry.

=== Operational Training Units ===
==== No. 3 (Coastal) Operational Training Unit ====
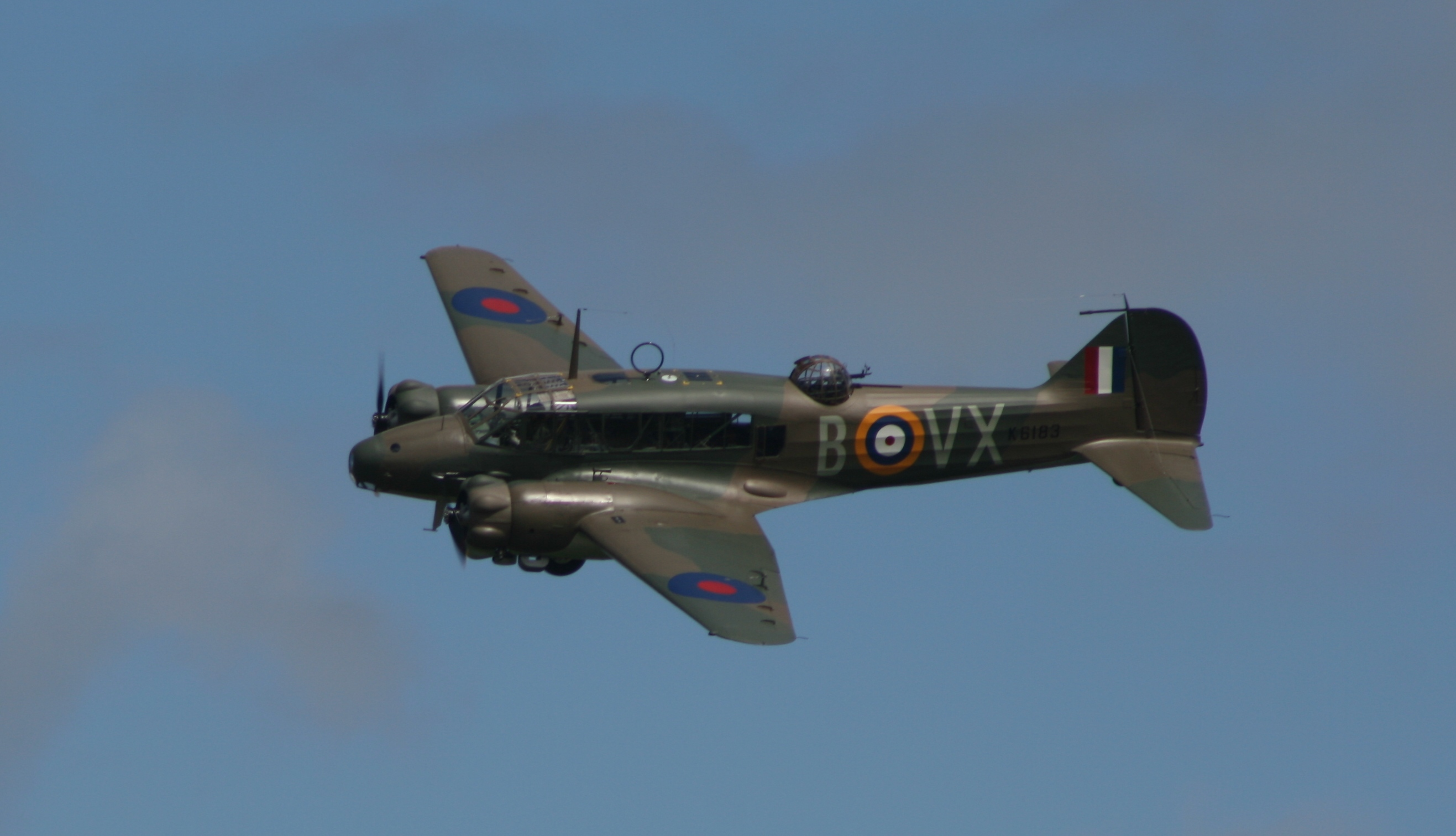
Avro Anson 652A Mk I, an example of the type flown by 'O' Flight No 3 (C) OTU

'O' Flight of No. 3 (Coastal) Operational Training Unit RAF relocated from RAF Haverfordwest. The flight was equipped with fourteen Avro Anson I aircraft. No. 3 (C) OTU was a training unit within No. 17 Group RAF, and was tasked with the training of aircrew for general reconnaissance and particularly the use of Leigh Lights. This was successfully used against Kriegsmarine submarines by RAF Coastal Command. The unit left RAF Templeton in December 1943, moving to RAF St Athan where it was renamed No. 12 Radio School RAF.

==== No. 8 (Coastal) Operational Training Unit ====
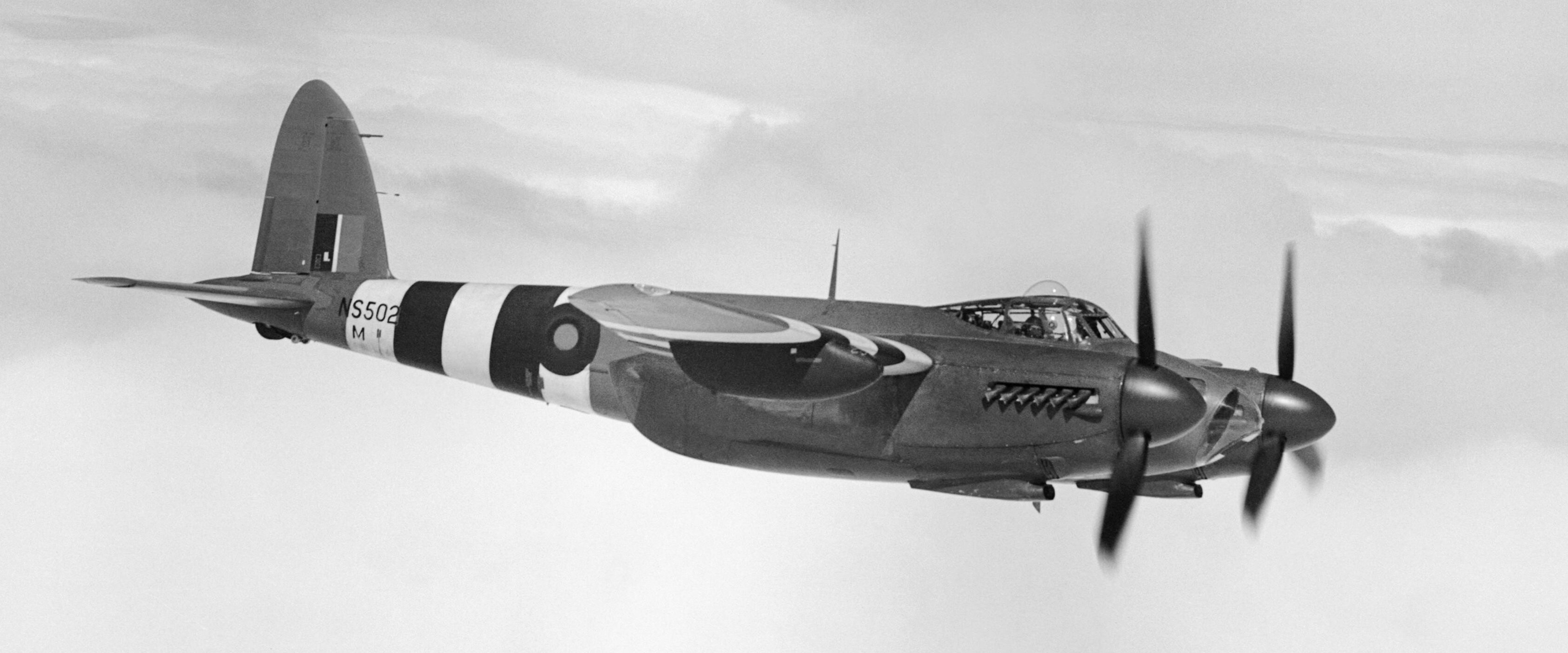
de Havilland Mosquito PR Mk XVI, an example of the type used by No. 8 (C) OTU

'A' Flight of No. 8 (Coastal) Operational Training Unit RAF relocated from RAF Haverfordwest on the 1 January 1945. The unit was tasked with training aircrew in photographic reconnaissance, for RAF Coastal Command and was made up of various marks of de Havilland Mosquito aircraft, along with a couple of marks of Supermarine Spitfire aircraft, a North American Harvard aircraft and a Miles Martinet aircraft. 'A' flight at Templeton moved on to RAF Brawdy on 27 February 1945. This was the last unit to operate from the airfield.

An engineering section of No. 8 (C) OTU remained at RAF Templeton between February and June 1945. The T2 hangar was used for the repair and maintenance of the unit's Supermarine Spitfire and de Havilland Mosquito aircraft, which operated out of Haverfordwest. When No. 8 (C) OTU left for RAF Benson on the 21 June 1945, RAF Templeton was closed down.

=== Anti Aircraft Co-Operation ===
==== 595 Squadron ====
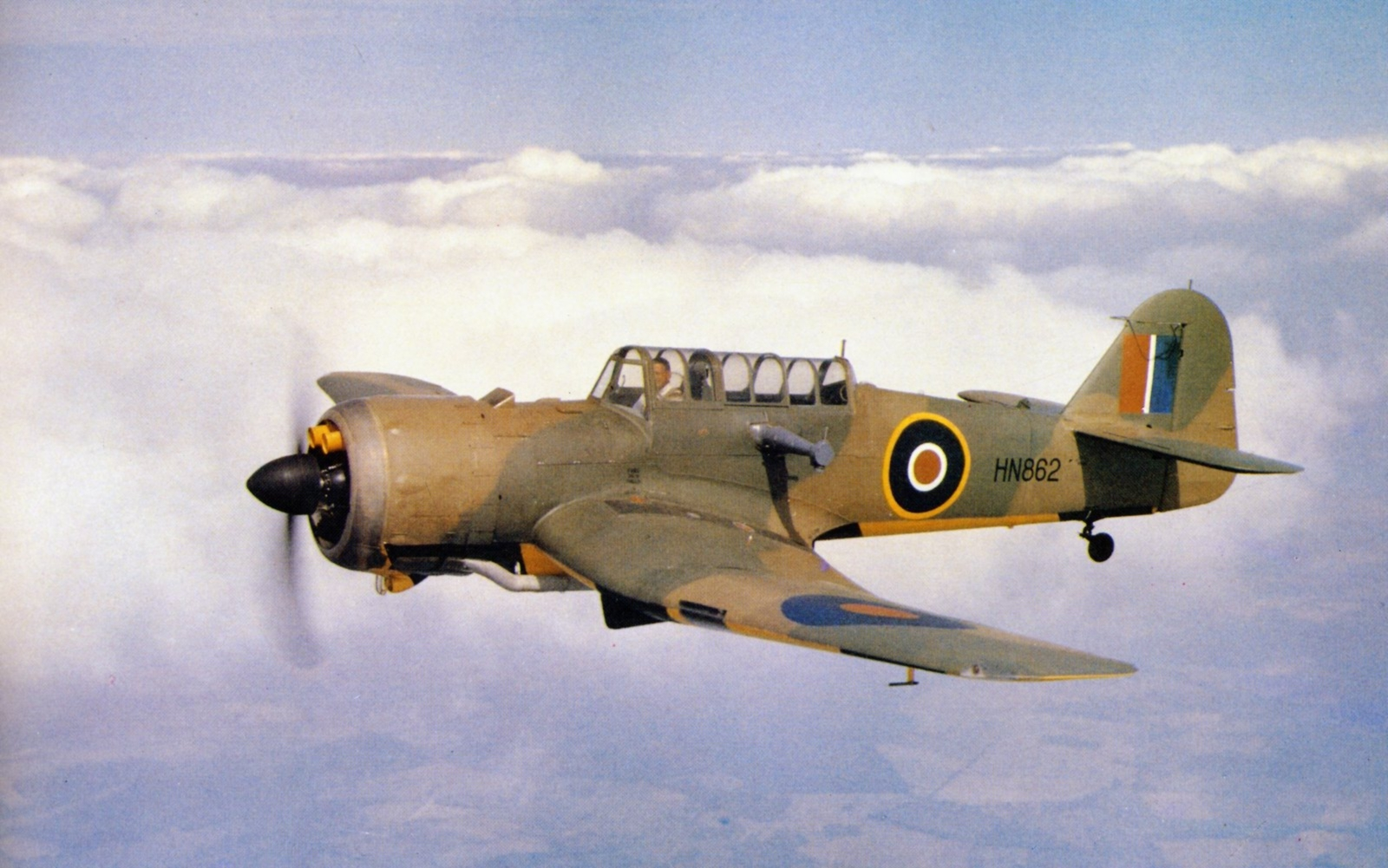
Miles M.25 Martinet TT MkI, an example of the type flown by No 595 Sqn

No. 595 Squadron RAF conducted its first official towed glider trial at RAF Templeton on the 17 August 1944. The squadron operated Miles Martinet and Supermarine Spitfire aircraft. Templeton’s concrete runways were far more suitable for aircraft towing winged glider targets, than the grass strip at the School of Anti Aircraft, located nearby at RAF Manorbier. The glider targets stability benefited from being towed on a firm surface. They had a wingspan of either eight or sixteen feet and had a tendency to flip over on a grass strip, more so when waterlogged, and often flipped the towing aircraft as well.

These initial trials were not successful and several gliders crashed on landing, however these incidents lead to improvements being made to both the gliders and the towing aircraft. No. 595 Sqn’s modified Miles Martinet aircraft did twice successfully used towed gliders, for the School of Anti Aircraft, resulting in several hits on the target and with both aircraft and target returning safely to Templeton. Further trials continued until the squadron returned to RAF Aberporth, on the 24 February 1945.

=== Other Units ===
==== 74 Gliding School ====
No 74 Gliding School formed at RAF Templeton in October 1944. The school was equipped with Slingsby Kirby Cadet TX.1, a single-seat glider. It moved to RAF Carew Cheriton during 1946.

No. 1607 (Anti-Aircraft Co-operation) Flight RAF

== United States Army Air Forces operational history ==
=== Gunnery & Tow Target ===
On 14 December 1943 the 1st Gunnery and Tow Target Flight, of the United States Army Air Forces, Eighth Air Force arrived at RAF Templeton. This unit moved from RAF Warton for a spell at Templeton equipped with Republic P-47 Thunderbolt aircraft which were used as target tugs, with thirty-foot (9.1 m) sleeves used because of the introduction of Gyro gunsight and deflection shooting. Also used was coloured ammunition and each aircraft had its own colour. The unit was assigned to VIII Air Force Composite Command on the 14 February 1944. The No. 1 G&TT left on the 8 May 1944 and relocated to RAF Atcham.

== Current use ==
=== Templeton Dry Training Area ===
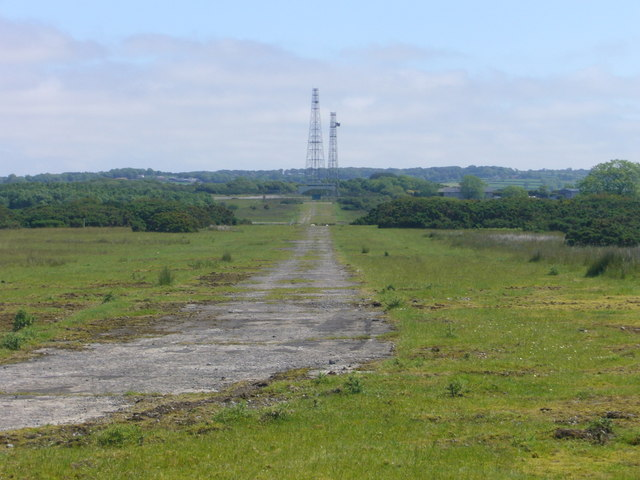
RAF Templeton southern taxiing road in 2007

Templeton Dry Training Area is used for training tasks such as helicopter and air defence exercises, along with low-level infantry tactics, and driver training. A permanent orienteering course is also part of the facility.

Both regular and territorial soldiers along with cadet units use Templeton Training Area for dry training. Pyrotechnics are authorised for use but have to be within specific designated areas. An army orienteering course exists for visiting units and a bridging pit is available for engineering units to use. Public access across the site is via two bridleways transversing the runways. The grassland is leased for grazing.

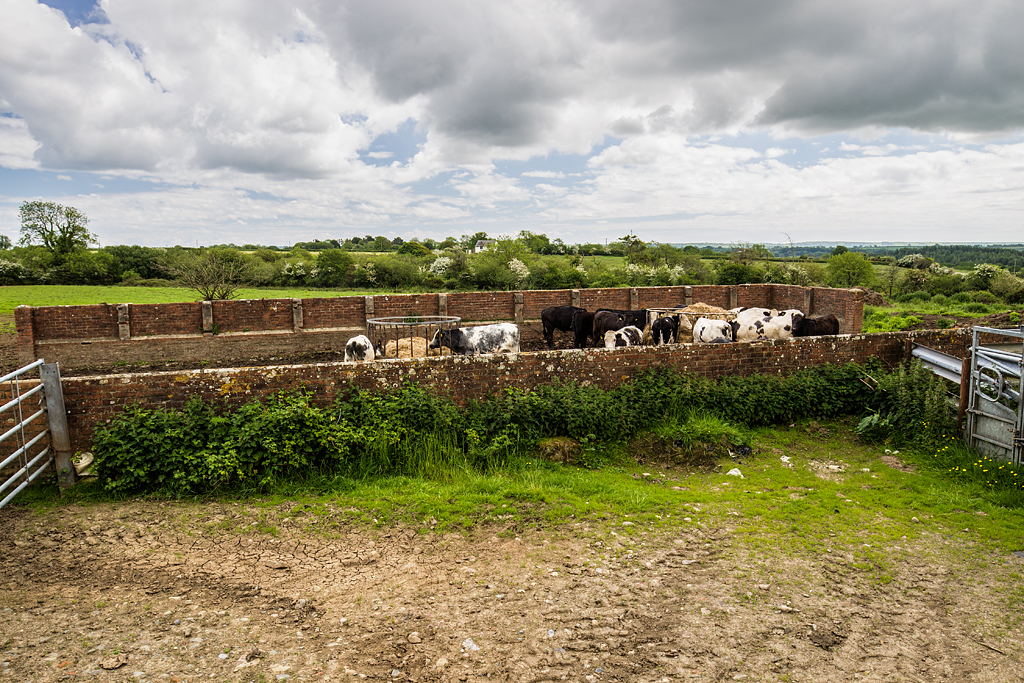
The remains of RAF Templeton's Standard Beam Approach blind landing radio navigation system walled enclosure

It is used for a variety of training tasks, including helicopter and air defence exercises, infantry and driver training. Usage is shared with a number of other activities, including agriculture, storage and model aircraft flying.

== Geography ==
The dry training area is part of Defence Training Estate Pembrokeshire. Templeton Training Area is the disused World War II airfield initially known as RAF Templeton of approximately 164 hectares (404 acres). It still has the three intersecting runways, along with the taxiways and aircraft hardstand areas. The topography is flat to a smooth rise and fall.

=== Nearby military sites ===
As well as the Templeton Dry Training Area, DTE Pembrokeshire (DTE P) consists of the Castlemartin Training Area and ranges at Castlemartin, Pembrokeshire, the Penally Training Camp just outside Tenby in Pembrokeshire, and the CAD range at ADR Manorbier about 5 miles (8.0 km) south west of Tenby, Pembrokeshire.

=== Nearby places ===
Templeton Dry Training Area is located between the town and community of Narberth, Pembrokeshire to the north, Tenby, Pembrokeshire a seaside town and community to the south, and the town and community of St Clears, Carmarthenshire, to the east.

== See also ==
- List of former Royal Air Force stations
- List of ferry units of the Royal Air Force
- List of Royal Air Force Operational Training Units
- RAF Manorbier, Air Defence Range (ADR) Manorbier, a missile range, part of Defence Training Estate Pembrokeshire.
- Castlemartin Training Area, a direct-fire Armoured fighting vehicle (AFV) live gunnery range, part of Defence Training Estate Pembrokeshire.
