= Donna Nook Air Weapons Range =

Military range in Lincolnshire, England

- Near North Somercotes, Lincolnshire in England
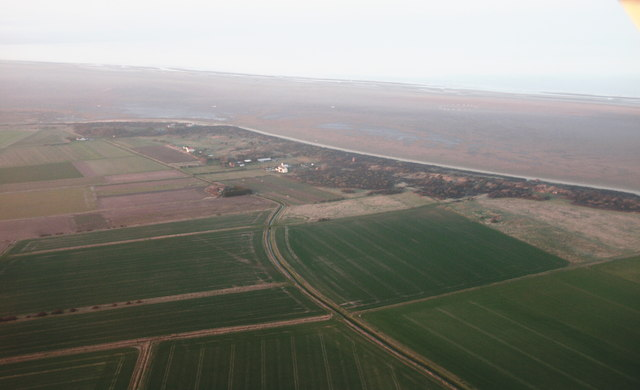
- Aerial view of Donna Nook AWR during 2014

Site information
- Type: Air weapons range
- Owner: Ministry of Defence
- Operator: Defence Infrastructure Organisation
- Controlled by: Defence Training Estate
- Condition: Operational

Location
- Location in Lincolnshire
- Coordinates: 53°28′29″N 000°09′07″E

Site history
- Built: 1936 (as RAF Donna Nook)
- In use: 1936 – present

Donna Nook Air Weapons Range is a Ministry of Defence air weapons range in East Lindsey, Lincolnshire, England. The range, as well as a now defunct airfield and radar station, were previously operated by the Royal Air Force and known as RAF Donna Nook.

== History ==
The badge used by Donna Nook whilst an RAF station

Donna Nook has been in continual military use since the First World War and was established as a protection point from Zeppelin airships trying to enter the Humber area.

=== Second World War ===
A minor airfield was operational from 1936 and used as a decoy up until 1945. The airfield was home to No. 206 Squadron RAF from August 1941 to July 1942. It also acted as a Relief Landing Ground (RLG) for RAF North Coates.

However, during the Second World War, RAF Donna Nook referred to a Chain Home Extremely Low (CHEL) radar station, sited a short distance away from the current establishment. This utilized a 10-cm radar set to track both low-flying intruders and German E-boats cruising offshore, and was operational in this role from 1943 to 1945. From evidence in his authorized biography it appears that it was to RAF Donna Nook that the young Sir Arthur C. Clarke was posted in 1943, shortly after an interview with Wing Commander (later Sir) Edward Jefferson, RAF, who was subsequently Director of Telecommunications for the General Post Office.

=== Bombing range ===
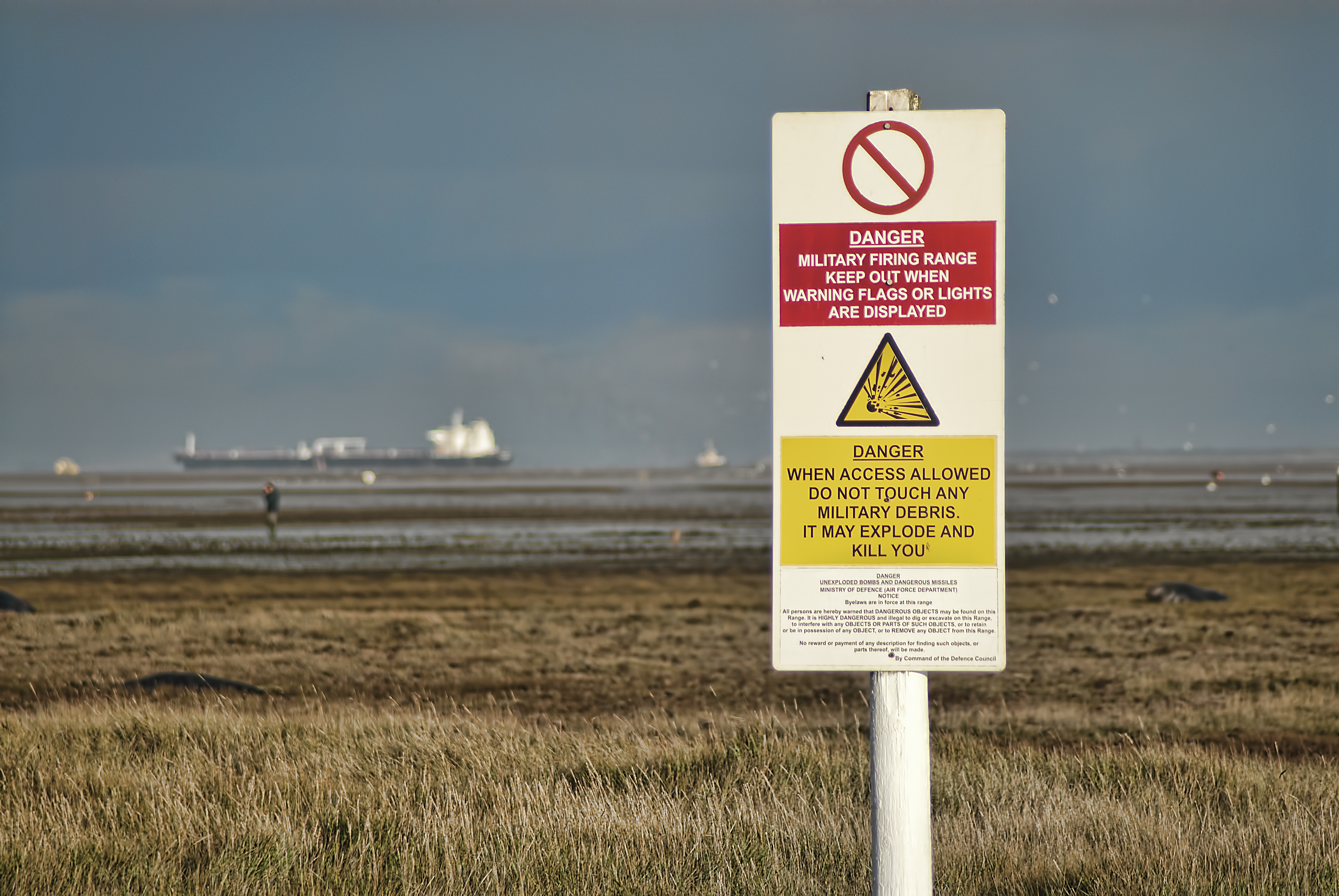
Range warning sign

The bombing range first opened up in 1926 with three bombing targets including one which was illuminated for night time bombing practice. The range closed in 1946 but was re-opened in 1976 when RAF Theddlethorpe was closed due to complaints from those living nearby. RAF Donna Nook is still used as an Air Weapons Range by UK, USAFE & NATO users and since 2008 has been administered by Defence Infrastructure Organisation (DIO), formerly Defence Training Estates (DTE).

The bombing range covers an area of 885 hectares on land and 3,200 hectares at sea.

=== 1981 air accident ===
On Friday 9 January 1981 at 1.35pm, whilst practising strafing runs at Donna Nook, a Fairchild Republic A-10 Thunderbolt II from the 510th Tactical Fighter Squadron at RAF Woodbridge, crashed into the North Sea.

The aircraft was piloted by Major Arthur Lloyd Moxon from Huron, South Dakota, who was killed. His body was found three weeks later on Wednesday 28 January 1981.

== Natural heritage ==
Donna Nook is just north of North Somercotes and is also a 6.2 miles (10 km) nature reserve with a large seal habitat in the early winter maintained by the Lincolnshire Wildlife Trust. It is the only national nature reserve in the UK on MOD land, and was opened on 18 July 2002 by Air Commodore Nigel Williams.

== See also ==
- List of Royal Air Force stations
