= Crowborough Training Camp =

Military camp in East Sussex, England

- Crowborough, East Sussex, England
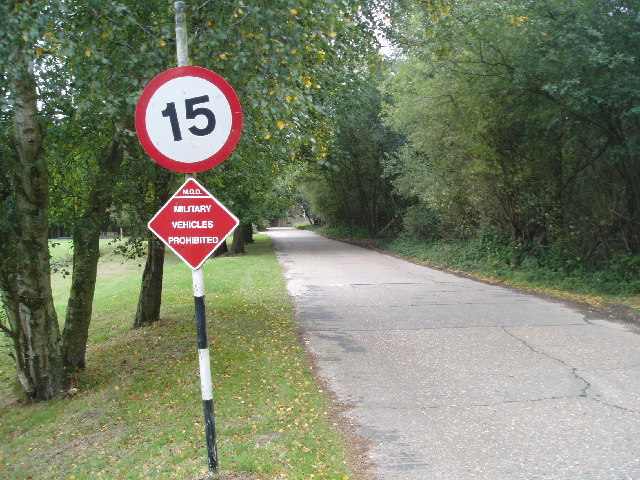
- Access road to the camp

Site information
- Type: Training camp
- Owner: Ministry of Defence
- Operator: British Army

Location
- Location within East Sussex
- Coordinates: 51.048°N 0.133°E

Site history
- Built: c.1914
- Built for: War Office
- In use: C.1914–present

Crowborough Training Camp is a military training camp located near the town of Crowborough in East Sussex, England, owned by and operated by the Defence Infrastructure Organisation on behalf of the UK Ministry of Defence. It consists of various facilities such as accommodation, ranges, and associated training area. Its sits within the wider footprint of the Cinque Ports Training Area (CPTA) within the South East England.

== History ==
The area surrounding Crowborough Town and the Ashdown Forrest were acquired by the War Office during the First World War. The Canadian Army established the Machine Gun School there during the war.

The areas around Crowborough Camp were used extensively by various military units to accommodate and provide training prior to the Normandy landings in June 1944 during the Second World War. There was a direct hit from a German V-1 flying bomb near to the camp, killing a number of troops, in July 1944.

During the COVID-19 pandemic the UK Government selected Crowborough from several sites to use as a quarantine facility for British troops deploying and returning from operations.

In 2024, the camp was used as a processing facility to accommodate people as part of the Afghan Relocations and Assistance Policy.

In October 2025, the UK Government announced that Crowborough Training Camp would be one of two military sites repurposed to provide temporary accommodation for asylum seekers and that around 900 men would be distributed between these sites.

== Current use ==
The camp hosts the ACF, ATC and Royal Marines Cadets. Units undertake training in Ashdown Forest and the nearby Pippingford Park. The area is also used for events such as mud runs, driving events and festivals.
