= RAF Manorbier =

Ministry of Defense High Velocity Missile range in Pembrokeshire, Wales

RAF Manorbier Royal Artillery Range Manorbier Air Defence Range Manorbier
- Part of Defence Training Estate
- Near Manorbier in Pembrokeshire in Wales
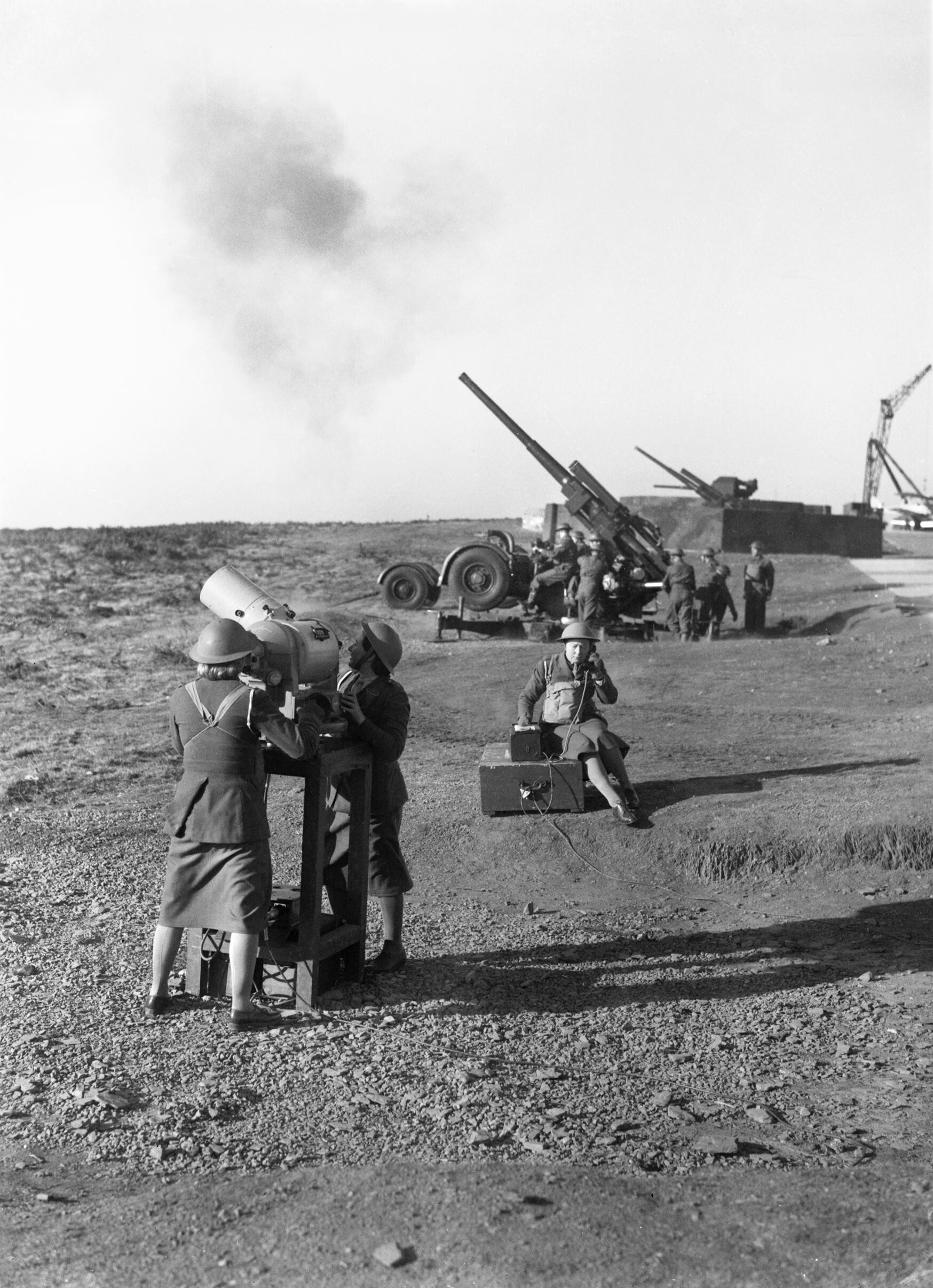
- Auxiliary Territorial Service workers operating a kinetheodolite (used to record on film the accuracy of anti-aircraft shells) at the Royal Artillery anti-aircraft training school at Manorbier

Site information
- Type: Royal Air Force airfield
- Owner: Air Ministry 1933 - 1946; War Office 1946 - 1964; Ministry of Defence 1964 - present
- Operator: Royal Air Force 1937 - 1946; British Armed Forces
- Controlled by: RAF Fighter Command; *No. 11 Group RAF 1944; Defence Infrastructure Organisation
- Open to the public: Yes, but when the ranges are used for live firing, red flags (day) or red lights (night) are displayed: access is prohibited
- Condition: Operational Range
- Website: GOV.UK (Manorbier range firing/flying notice)

Location
- Location within Pembrokeshire RAF Manorbier (the United Kingdom)
- Coordinates: 51°38′45″N 004°47′00″W

Site history
- Built: 1933
- In use: 1933-1946 (airfield); 1946 - present (Artillery Range)
- Battles/wars: European theatre of World War II

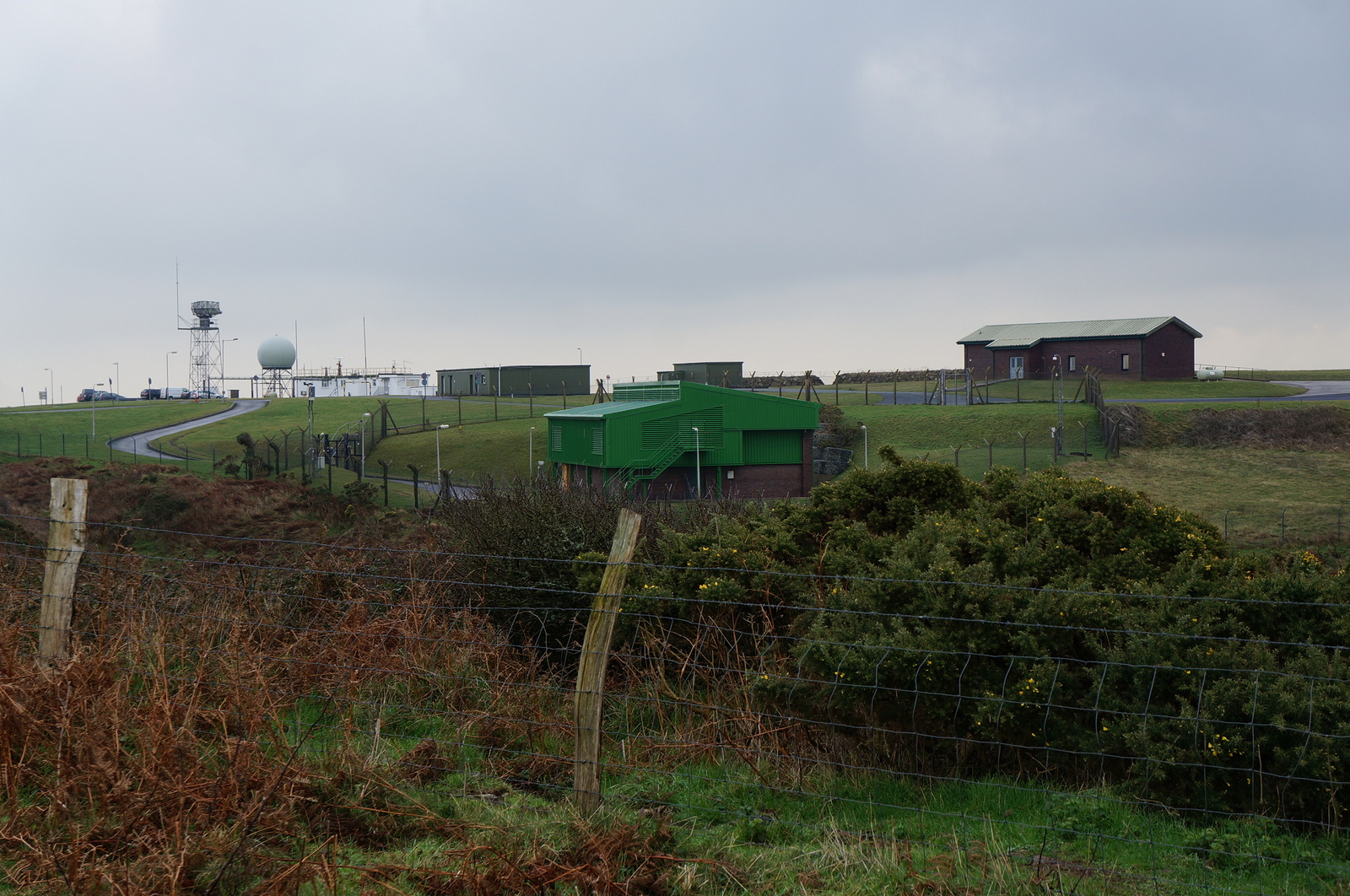
Air Defence Range Manorbier, Pembrokeshire

Royal Air Force Manorbier, or more simply RAF Manorbier, was a Royal Air Force airfield near Manorbier, Pembrokeshire, Wales. The site was first used in 1933 as a mixed civilian/military airfield and was the base for 'Y' Flight of No. 1 Anti-Aircraft Co-operation Unit RAF in 1937, using de Havilland DH.82 Queen Bee unmanned radio-controlled target drone. The airfield was passed on to the War Office in September 1946.

Air Defence Range (ADR) Manorbier is located within the Pembrokeshire Coast National Park. It is currently used by the Ministry of Defence and is the sole UK range used for the High Velocity Missile in the anti-aircraft role. The range comes under Defence Training Estate Pembrokeshire, and was formed out of merging the anti-aircraft school of Artillery at Larkhill and the field at Manorbier in 1972. It is now the main UK Close Air Defense (CAD) range for the British Army.

== History ==
RAF Manorbier started as a mixed civil and military airfield in 1933. Algernon Capell, 8th Earl of Essex kept his aircraft there while the RAF used it as a landing ground for land-based aircraft visiting the flying boat base of RAF Pembroke Dock, however this ended in 1935.

The site, consisting of a grass runway and canvas tents, was then used as an anti-aircraft training school from the spring of 1937 with No. 1 Anti-Aircraft Co-operation Unit RAF 'Y' Flight being based at the airfield. The unit operated the de Havilland Queen Bees, a pilot-less radio-controlled version of the de Havilland Tiger Moth trainer, which was used for anti-aircraft gunnery practice. The runway was enlarged in 1940 and the airfield acquired catapults to launch Queen Bees from clifftops so gunnery practice could be continued when the grass runways were flooded. Defences were also fitted to the airfield, including the Pickett-Hamilton retractable pillbox, which can be fitted with different calibre guns and can be raised or lowered hydraulically.

The Pilotless Aircraft Unit (PAU) was based permanently at Manorbier, using a tender to retrieve drones from the sea and return them back to the base. The unit continued to use the airfield even after the war.

The airfield was occupied by No. 11 Group RAF in 1944, it was also occupied by No. 595 Squadron RAF from 1 December 1943. The squadron flew a wide variety of aircraft, including the Hawker Henley Mk III, Hawker Hurricane Mks IIC and IV, Miles Martinet, Airspeed Oxford, Vultee Vengeance and the Supermarine Spitfire Mks VB, XII, IX and XVI. The squadron left on 27 April 1946.

== Royal Air Force Operational History ==
=== Anti-Aircraft Co-operation ===
‘Y' Flight of No. 1 Anti-Aircraft Co-operation Unit RAF (1 AACU) was equipped with the de Havilland DH.82 Queen Bee a pilotless radio-controlled target drone variant of the Tiger Moth aircraft, used from RAF Manorbier for training artillery gunners, at the nearby Royal Artillery Camp, with their anti-aircraft target practice. The unit initially operated at RAF Manorbier between the 29 June and the 4 October 1938, before arriving for a second time, on the 15 May 1939. 'Y' Flight of 1 AACU disbanded on the 16 August 1942 at RAF Manorbier. (see Pilotless Aircraft Unit below)

No. 595 Squadron RAF operated a detachment at RAF Manorbier from December 1943. It provided anti-aircraft co-operation for the School of Artillery, helping to calibrate their equipment by flying at a fixed course and speed and target tugs. The detachment left RAF Manorbier, when the parent squadron moved from RAF Aberpoth to RAF Fairwood Common.

=== Pilotless Aircraft Unit ===
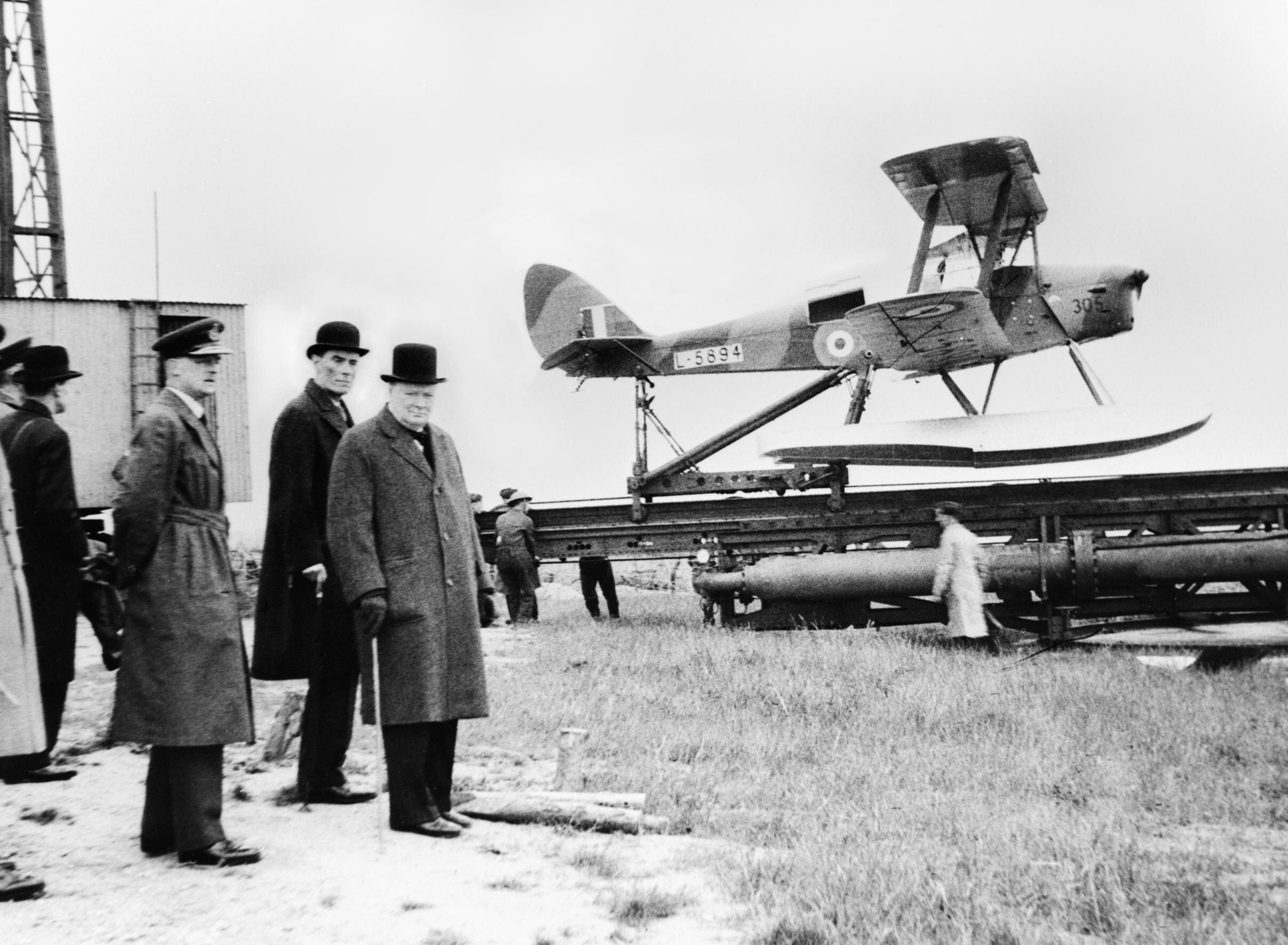
Preparations being made for the launch of a de Havilland Queen Bee from its ramp, at an unspecified UK location, albeit an example of the operation at Manorbier. The then Prime Minister, Mr Winston Churchill, with Captain The Right Honourable David Margesson, the then Secretary of State for War, watching on.

The Pilotless Aircraft Unit arrived at RAF Manorbier in May 1942, relocating from RAF St Athan. It was originally known as Pilotless Aircraft Section, redesignating from Section to Unit around December 1940. Although it mainly used the de Havilland Queen Bee, the unit operated a number of pilotless aircraft, and also used various support aircraft alongside:

- de Havilland DH.60 Moth
- Avro Tutor
- Westland Wallace Mk II
- de Havilland Tiger Moth II
- Avro Anson I
- Miles Magister I
- Blackburn Botha Mk I
- de Havilland Queen Bee
- Airspeed Queen Wasp I
- Westland Lysander III
- Percival Proctor IV
- Queen Martinet

'Y' Flight, No. 1 Anti-Aircraft Co-operation Unit RAF (1 AACU), which was operating de Havilland Queen Bee at RAF Manorbier, was absorbed by the Pilotless Aircraft Unit on the 16 August 1942.

The Pilotless Aircraft Unit disbanded at RAF Manorbier on the 15 March 1946.

=== Other Units ===
The following units were here at some point:

- No. 2767 Squadron RAF Regiment
- No. 4109 Anti-Aircraft Flight RAF Regiment

== Current use ==
=== Air Defence Range Manorbier ===
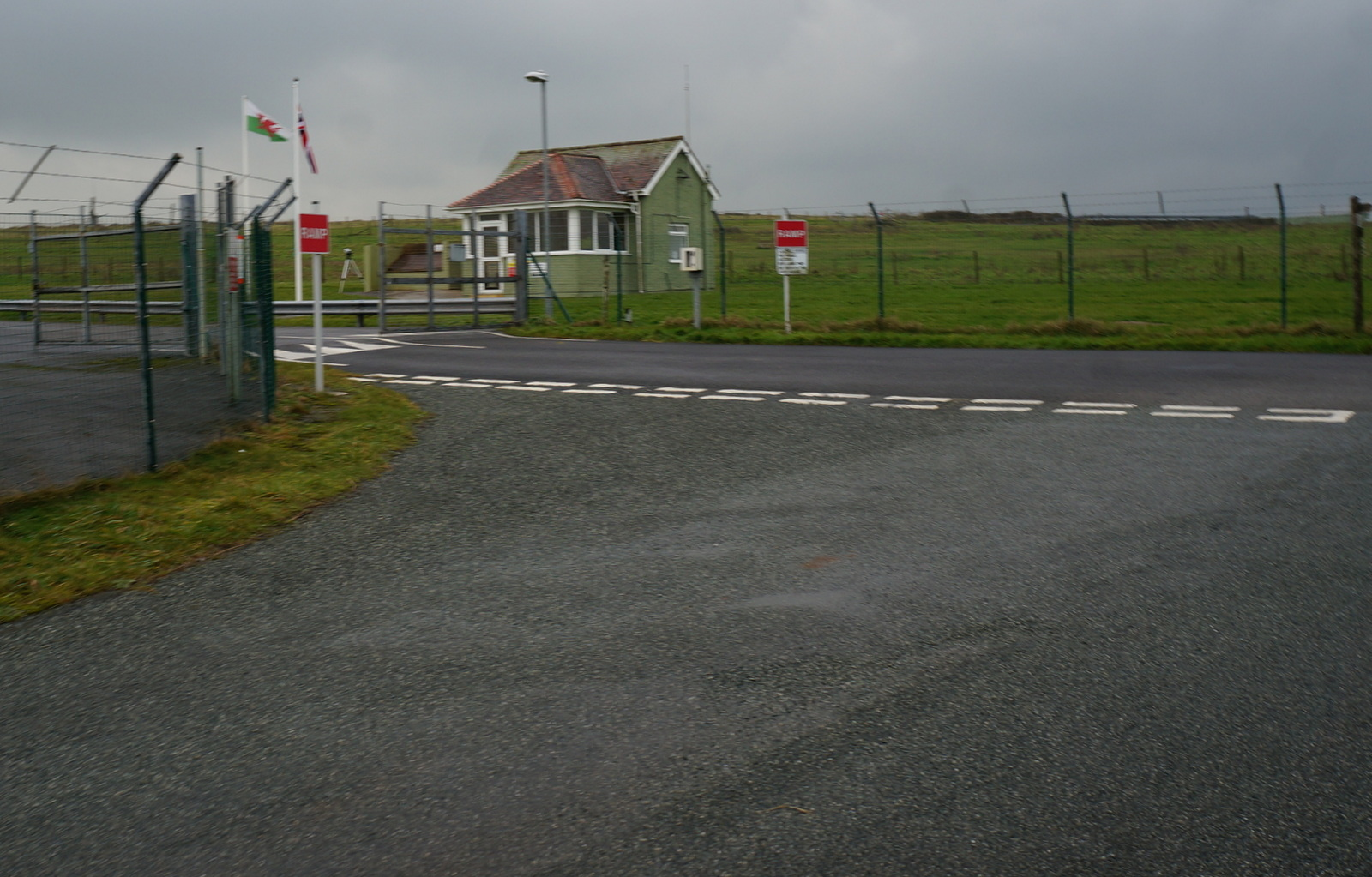
The Gatehouse at Manorbier Range, Pembrokeshire

The site is currently used as training and testing range for the British Army known as Air Defence Range (ADR) Manorbier, the testing range fires a maximum of 750 surface-to-air missile each year on 100 designated testing days. Established in 1972, it is the British Army’s main UK Close Air Defence (CAD) range and is used to fire a variety of CAD missiles and machine guns. Both Army and Commando CAD units utilise the training facilities, along with the Defence Air Warfare Centre.

While Parliamentary Under-Secretary of State at the Welsh Office, Nicholas Bennett, Member of Parliament for Pembrokeshire, confirmed for 1989 that the range at Manorbier was used by Royal Artillery units for practice firings of Man-portable air-defense systems (MANPADS or MPADS) including Javelin and Blowpipe. British Army and Army Reserve use totalled 11,067 and 11,294 man training days respectively.

The principle weapon system fired at ADR Manorbier was fitted for night operation in 2005, the only suitable site for testing new night vision technology at the time. The Ministry of Defence also proposed a plan to launch a maximum of 100 missiles for 20 nights a year. This was met with opposition from the locals who claimed that should the plan be approved, tourism will suffer and air pollution in the area will increase.

== Geography ==
The range is part of Defence Training Estate Pembrokeshire. The installation covers 102 acres (41 hectares), however, the danger area is around 220 sq mi (570 km^{2}), extending up to 13 mi (21 km) out to sea and 50,000 ft (15,000 m) upwards.

=== Nearby military sites ===
As well as the Manorbier range, DTE Pembrokeshire (DTE P) consists of the Castlemartin Training Area and ranges at Castlemartin, Pembrokeshire, the Penally Training Camp just outside Tenby in Pembrokeshire, and the Dry Training Area at Templeton about 2 miles (3.2 km) south of Narberth, Pembrokeshire.

=== Nearby places ===
ADR Manorbier is located between Pembroke, Pembrokeshire to the north west, Tenby, Pembrokeshire to the north east, and the former Royal Air Force station, RAF Carew Cheriton, near Carew, Pembrokeshire to the north.

=== National park ===
The range is located within the Pembrokeshire Coast National Park, and also includes the Pembrokeshire Coast Path which is a designated National Trail.

== Current operations ==
=== High-velocity Missile ===
The Royal Marines Air Defence Troop, from 30 Commando (IX) Group, specialise in using the High Velocity Missile (HVM), known as Starstreak. Within one second of launching, the HVM reaches Mach 3. Missile firing camps at ADR Manorbier are highly technical and require months of planning. In order to live fire a HVM, an operator must do hundreds of simulator shots and target drone tracking with a laser. Banshee drones are used and are operated by technicians from QinetiQ. Designed to survive the missile engagement, the drones have a radar which enables estimation if the HVM would have successfully hit an aircraft. A specialist team at the range, from the Royal Artillery Gunnery Training Team (GTT) based at Larkhill in Wiltshire, co-ordinate safety. The missiles are fired from land out to sea and range staff ensure all air and sea traffic is monitored.

=== Lightweight Multirole Missile ===
In 2019 the Royal Marines tested the Lightweight Multirole Missile (LMM) system, known as Martlet, to take out airborne targets at Air Defence Range Manorbier. Air Defence Troop of Plymouth-based 30 Commando (IX) Group were the first sub unit to use the system. Drones were launched and the commandos used the laser-guided missiles to fire at their targets. The Martlet, which has a range of more than 6 km, is intended to complement the High Velocity Missile (HVM). Banshee target drones were used in the exercise, with Royal Artillery instructors and Thales Air Defence technicians to gauge the success of the engagement.

During March 2019, Thales Air Defence undertook ground firing trials of 6 x Lightweight Multirole Missiles fired from the Thales designed launcher system, at a small boat target at sea a distance of 4.5 km (2.8 mi) away, at Air Defence Range Manorbier. This formed part of the Integration testing phase of the Future Anti Surface Guided Weapon (Light), FASGW(L) programme. The programme included testing of all parts of the weapon system including the missile itself, the launcher system to be fitted to the AW159 Wildcat military helicopter and relative equipment. The missiles used were fitted with telemetry software and had no warhead. The data gathered enabled analysis of the launcher, the guidance system and missile performance.

== See also ==
- List of former Royal Air Force stations
- List of Royal Air Force aircraft squadrons
- List of anti-aircraft cooperation units of the Royal Air Force
- 7th Air Defence Group, responsible for all the British Army's ground based air defence assets.
- RAF Templeton, Templeton Dry Training Area, part of Defence Training Estate Pembrokeshire.
- Castlemartin Training Area, a direct-fire Armoured fighting vehicle (AFV) live gunnery range, part of Defence Training Estate Pembrokeshire.
