= Castlemartin Training Area =

Military training area in Pembrokeshire, Wales

- Part of Defence Training Estate
- Located near Castlemartin, Pembrokeshire, within the Pembrokeshire Coast National Park
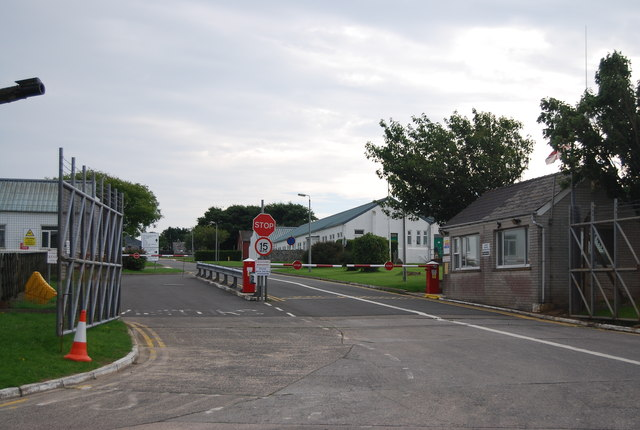
- Entrance to Merrion Camp at the training area

Site information
- Type: Training Area and Range
- Owner: Ministry of Defence
- Operator: British Army
- Controlled by: Defence Infrastructure Organisation
- Open to the public: Yes, visitors to Range West must attend a briefing
- Condition: Operational
- Website: GOV.UK (Castlemartin firing notice)

Location
- Location within Pembrokeshire Castlemartin Training Area (the United Kingdom)
- Coordinates: 51.63°N 4.98°W

Site history
- Built: 1938
- Built for: War Office
- In use: 1939 - 1946; 1951 - present

Garrison information
- Designations: Site of Special Scientific Interest

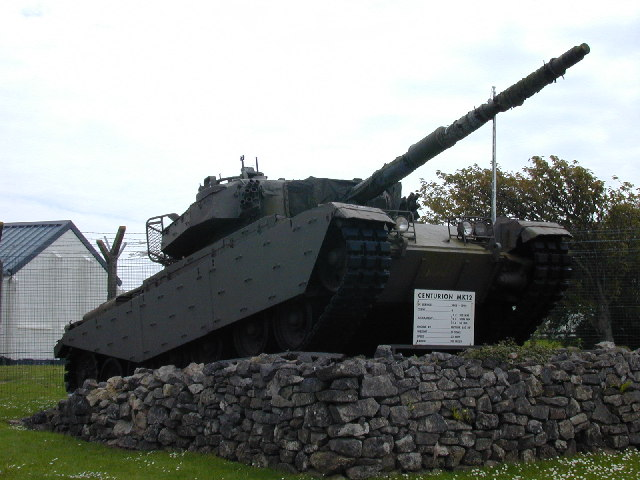
Centurion Mk12 tank at Merrion Camp, Castlemartin

Castlemartin Training Area is a British Army military training area and armoured fighting vehicle range located in the Welsh county of Pembrokeshire. It was originally established for tank training by the Royal Armoured Corps in 1938. The training area is located within the Pembrokeshire Coast National Park, on the South Pembrokeshire coast.

== History ==
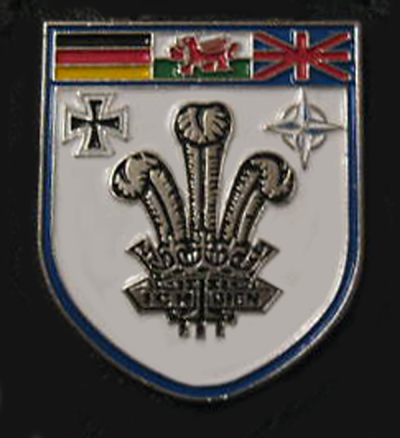
Castlemartin shield

The Castlemartin Training Area was established in 1938 from both deserted and inhabited farmland, and from parts of the defunct Cawdor Estate. The ranges were abandoned by the military soon after the Second World War, but were re-instated in 1951 when the Korean War started.

In 1961 there was a shortage of suitable tank training areas in the northern part of West Germany for the then recently reactivated German Tank Units. The British Army of the Rhine (BAOR) extensively used the ranges at the Bergen-Hohne Training Area which totalled 72,000 acres (29,000 ha) as their training demands could not be met by the limited acreage available in the United Kingdom. Therefore, a NATO accordance was agreed in Paris whereby the fledgling West German forces could use the 5,000-acre (2,000 ha) (Note: The size of the range is now described as 6,000 acres (2,400 ha), in Hansard it is listed as 5,000 acres (2,000 ha) by Mr Harold Watkinson, Minister of Defence in 1961) range at Castlemartin. This relationship between the German Armoured Units and Castlemartin lasted until October 1996, when after Germany reunification, additional ranges in eastern Germany became available.

In 1999 the Defence Training Estate was formed and units from all over the UK and NATO have trained on the ranges.

Castlemartin is one of two armoured fighting vehicle ranges in the UK with direct live firing gunnery exercises and armoured vehicle manoeuvres. The other is Lulworth Cove. Castlemartin is the only Defence Training Area normally available for armoured units to fire live rounds on land and littoral environments including live firing into the sea.

The Pembrokeshire Coast Path, part of the Wales Coast Path, has to avoid the range and in 2011, the MoD created a diversionary route which was safer for walkers by protecting them from having to negotiate the narrow country roads with fast-moving traffic.

=== Incidents ===
In May 2012, Ranger Michael Maguire from the 1st Battalion, The Royal Irish Regiment died in a live fire incident on the range. Ranger Maguire was resting in a safe area where he had removed his body armour and helmet when a stray round entered his temple. The machine gun fire that was responsible for his death also put civilians at risk on neighbouring beaches although there was no report of injuries. Ranger Maguire and his unit were training for deployment to Afghanistan.

On 14 June 2017 two Royal Tank Regiment soldiers were killed in an incident that involved the failure of a tank's main armament, due to the incomplete fitting of all parts that were required. This led to hot gases being discharged that then ignited weapon charges that had been removed from their storage. The explosion and fire that occurred caused the injuries to all four of the crew, with two crew being fatally injured.

On 4 March 2021, Sergeant Gavin Hillier of 1st Battalion, Welsh Guards died during a live firing exercise.

== Geography ==
The training area is owned by the Ministry of Defence (MoD) and part of Defence Training Estate Pembrokeshire (DTE P). The installation covers roughly 6,000 acres (2,400 hectares) making it the largest single part of DTE P. The ranges are active for 44 weeks of the year and when in use can include a coastal exclusion zone of as much as 12 nautical miles (22 km) off the coast, or as little as 3 nautical miles (5.6 km) depending on which weapon system and ammunition is being used.

=== Nearby military sites ===
As well as the Castlemartin Training Area, DTE P is responsible for the CAD range at ADR Manorbier about 5 miles (8.0 km) south west of Tenby, Pembrokeshire, the Penally Training Camp just outside Tenby, and the Dry Training Area at Templeton about 2 miles (3.2 km) south of Narberth, Pembrokeshire.

=== Nearby places ===
Castlemartin Training Area is located between Pembroke to the north east, Freshwater West beach to the west, and the site of the former Royal Air Force station, RAF Angle, to the north west.

=== National park ===
The training area is located within the Pembrokeshire Coast National Park, and also includes the Pembrokeshire Coast Path which is a designated National Trail. Castlemartin is within an area designated as a Site of Special Scientific Interest. It contains a wide variety of flora, along with important archaeological and geological findings, including notable fossils.

== Notable Landmarks ==
St Govan's Chapel is a chapel located at St Govan's Head. It is a medieval pilgrimage chapel, thought to date to the 13th- to 14th- centuries and is constructed of limestone. The chapel is situated within a rocky gorge, accessed by around fifty stone steps. The building was listed with Grade I status, on the 8 February 1996.

St Martin’s Chapel is a medieval chapel situated in the Castlemartin range. It was restored and rededicated, 1901-3, by Lady Victoria Alexandrina Lambton, daughter of the 2nd Earl Cawder and her husband, Lt. Col. Francis Lambton. In the churchyard there is also a Celtic cross on four steps which was erected by Clarke of Llandaff, in 1909.

Limestone features: Green Bridge of Wales, Huntsman's Leap and Stack Rocks.

== Current operations ==
Castlemartin is the sole British Army range generally available for gunnery exercises and manoeuvres using live fire and includes on-land impact areas and a large offshore safety area. The main use is for 'mounted' (in-vehicle) and 'dismounted' (on foot), firing. Dismounted dry training (non-live firing) is also conducted across most of the area. The range is available for the British Army, Army Reserve, Army Cadet Force, other services and some overseas forces.

== Chronology ==
- 1938: The range was established. Used for tank training by the Royal Armoured Corps.
- 1942: Castlemartin Armoured Fighting Vehicles Ranges Byelaws 1942 made and come into force.
- 1945: Closed. Land returned to agricultural use.
- 1948: Site acquired by the War Department.
- 1951: The range re-opened due to the emergence of the Korean War of 1950 to 1953.
- 1952: Castlemartin is incorporated into the Pembrokeshire Coast National Park.
- 1961-05: Bundeswehr main battle tank units started using the range.
- 1986-09-03: Castlemartin Royal Armoured Corps Range Byelaws 1986 made.
- 1986-11-01: Castlemartin Royal Armoured Corps Range Byelaws 1986 come into operation, revoking 1942 Byelaws.
- 1995: The ranges were taken over by Army Training Estates (ATE), from the Royal Armoured Corps.
- 1995: Training activities were expanded to include infantry and Small Arms and Light Weapons.
- 1996-10: Bundeswehr armoured Units left Castlemartin for ranges in eastern Germany following the German reunification.
- 2011: Castlemartin is classified as a Site of Special Scientific Interest (SSSI).
- 2013: French fighter jets used Castlemartin as part of a major training exercise.
- 2014: Exercise Pashtun Tempest. 5 Day Exercise. 1st The Queen's Dragoon Guards, operating International MXT-MV Husky and Foxhound armoured fighting vehicles in readiness for the last British troop Afghanistan tour.
- 2022: The existing range towers, on Range Two and Range Five, were designed to be used by the Army of the 1970s and are obsolete, and need replacing; tower two is the first to be replaced with a new state of the art range tower.

== See also ==
- RAF Manorbier, Air Defence Range (ADR) Manorbier, a missile range, part of Defence Training Estate Pembrokeshire.
- RAF Templeton, Templeton Dry Training Area, part of Defence Training Estate Pembrokeshire.
