= Defence Training Estate =

UK Ministry of Defence organisation

Defence Training Estate is an organisation within the United Kingdom Ministry of Defence. It is the operating division of the Defence Infrastructure Organisation, and is responsible for the management of the 78% of the MoD's estate allocated as Training Areas and Ranges. It provides sufficient and suitable estate to support the training requirements of the British Armed Forces, whilst ensuring environmental management and appropriate historical and archaeological preservation.

== Structure and partners ==
The organisation is headquartered at Waterloo Lines, Warminster, and has a number of regional headquarters responsible for the management of the training estate on a regional basis.

DTE works with nature conservation bodies to safeguard designated sites and protected species within the estate. These bodies include the Joint Nature Conservation Committee, Natural England, Scottish Natural Heritage, the Countryside Council for Wales and the Northern Ireland Environment Agency.

Some practical support is outsourced to Landmarc Solutions, a joint venture between Interserve (a UK support services company) and PAE (an American multinational support services company owned by Lindsay Goldberg).

DTE runs five Air Weapons Ranges for military operational training: RAF Holbeach and RAF Donna Nook in Lincolnshire (England), RAF Pembrey in Carmarthenshire (Wales), the Tain Air Weapons Range in Rossshire and Cape Wrath in Sutherland (Scotland). A former air weapons range at RAF Wainfleet in Lincolnshire was decommissioned in 2009. It had been in use since 1890 for artillery training, originally by the 1st Lincolnshire Artillery Volunteers.

== Public access ==
DTE operate a principle of presumption of public access to the training estate. Access is limited where training and exercise activities are taking place or where the use of munitions precludes safe access.

== Conservation and archaeology ==
As much of the training estate remains undeveloped, either through habitation or agriculture, the training estate holds considerable conservation and archaeological value.

== Training estates ==
=== Wales & West Midlands ===
- Headquarters Defence Training Estate Wales & West Midlands, at The Barracks, Brecon
  - Defence Training Estate West Midlands, at The Barracks, Brecon
    - Swynnerton Training Area
    - Nesscliffe Training Area
    - Leek and Upper Hulme Training Area
    - Kinmel Park Training Area
    - Bramcote Mains Training Area
    - Sealand Rifle Ranges
    - Llansilin Rifle Ranges
    - Whittington Rifle Ranges
    - Tyddesley Wood Rifle Ranges
    - Pontrilas Army Training Area
  - Defence Training Estate Wales, at Sennybridge Training Area
    - Sennybridge Training Area
    - Caerwent Training Area
    - Pwllholm Training Camp
    - Rogiet Rifle Ranges
  - Defence Training Estate Pembrokeshire, at Castlemartin Training Area, Pembrokeshire
    - Castlemartin Training Area
    - Air Defence Range Manorbier
    - Templeton Dry Training Area
    - Pembrey Sands Air Weapons Range

=== North East ===
- Headquarters, Defence Training Estate North East, at Wathgill Camp, Catterick Garrison
  - Whinny Hill Training Area (Catterick Garrison)
  - Ripon Training Area
  - Strensall Training Area
  - Driffield Training Area
  - Battle Hill Ranges
  - Defence Training Estate Otterburn, at Otterburn Training Area
    - Otterburn Training Area
    - Carshope Plantation
    - Quickening Cote Battle Shooting Area
    - Redesdale Rifle Ranges

=== East ===
- Headquarters Defence Training Estate East, at West Tofts Camp, Thetford
  - Colchester Training Area
  - Stanford Training Area
  - Beckingham Training Area
  - Yardley Chase Training Area
  - Salthouse Heath Training Area
  - Kelling Heath Training Area
  - Barnham Training Area
  - Fulbeck Rifle Ranges
  - Thetford Rifle Ranges
  - Barton Road Rifle Ranges
  - Fingringhoe Rifle Ranges
  - RAF Donna Nook
  - RAF Holbeach

=== South East ===
- Headquarters, Defence Training Estate South East, at Hythe, Kent
  - East Kent Dry Training Area
  - Mereworth Woods Training Area
  - Crowborough Training Camp / Pippingford Park Training Area
  - Hythe Rifle Range
  - Lydd Rifle Range
  - Defence Training Estate Home Counties
    - Longmoor Training Area
    - Bordon Training Area
    - Barossa Training Area
    - Bramley Training Area
    - Barton Stacey Training Area
    - Browndown Military Area
    - Aldershot Training Area
    - Newtown Training Area
    - Otmoor Rifle Ranges
    - Pirbright Rifle Ranges
    - Ash Rifle Ranges
    - Chilcomb Range

=== North West ===
- Headquarters Defence Training Estate North West, at Warcop Training Area
  - Warcop Training Area
  - Halton Training Camp
  - Holcombe Moor Training Area

=== South West ===
- Headquarters, Defence Training Estate South West, at Wyvern Barracks, Exeter
  - Dartmoor Training Area
  - Braunton Burrows Training Area
  - Bodmin Moor Training Area
  - Langport Range & Dry Training Area
  - Tregantle Fort and Antony Training Area
  - Chickerell Camp & Wyke Regis Training Area
  - Yoxter Cadet Training Camp
  - Penhale Training Area
  - Salisbury Plain Training Area

=== Scotland and Northern Ireland ===
- Defence Training Estate Scotland
  - Headquarters Defence Training Estate Scotland and Northern Ireland, Forth View House, Rosyth
  - Barry Buddon Training Area
  - Castlelaw Training Area
  - Tighnablair Training Area
  - Garelochhead Training Area
  - Inverness Training Centre, at Fort George
  - Kirkcudbright Training Area
  - Tain Cudbright Training Area
  - Cape Wrath Training Centre
  - Bunhill Range
  - Black Dog Range
  - Scotstown Moor Training Area
  - Wick Training Area

== See also ==
- List of British Army installations
