= Pembrey Airport =

Pembrey West Wales Airport
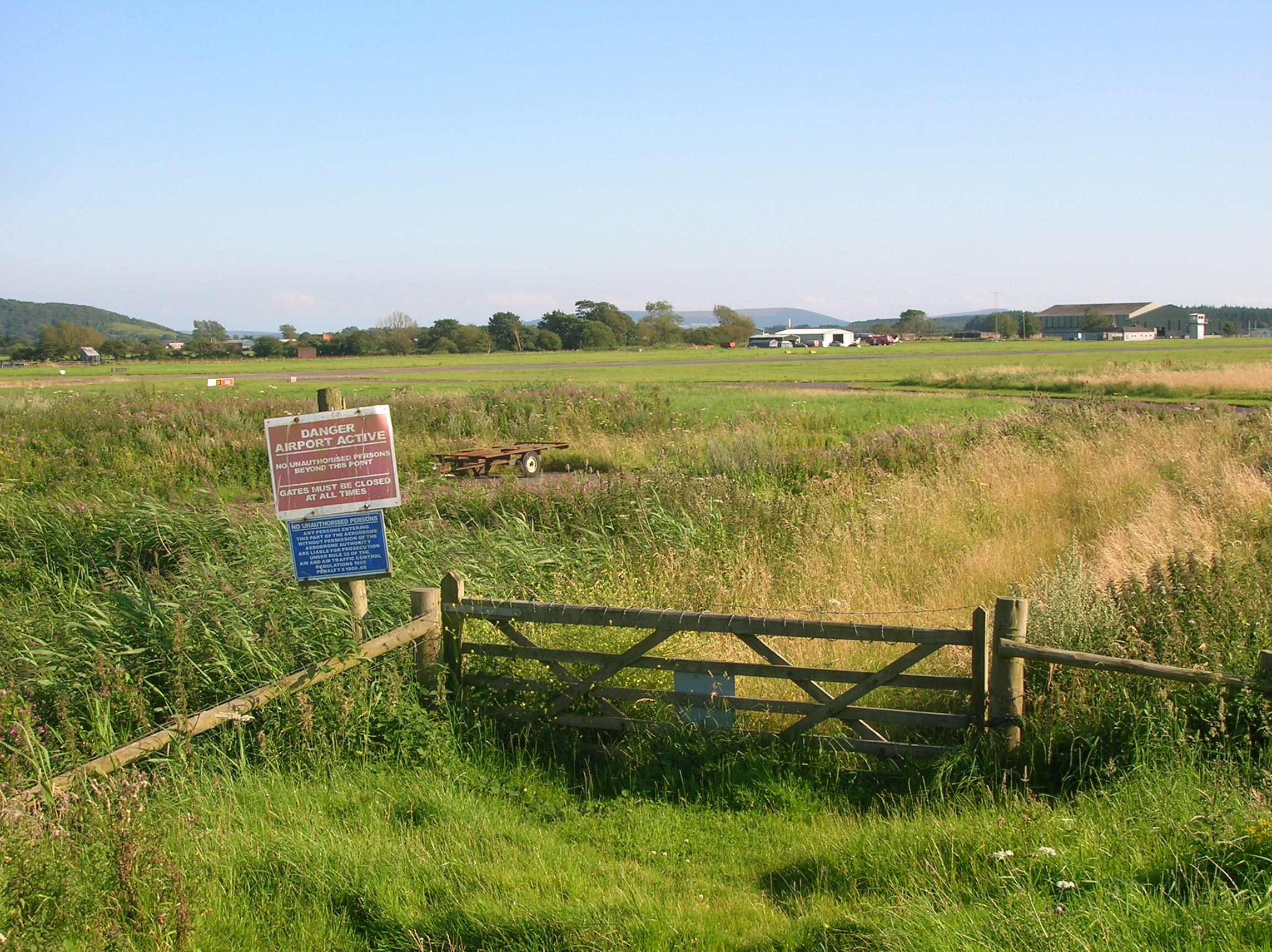
- IATA: none; ICAO: ~~EGFP~~

Summary
- Airport type: Public
- Owner: Carmarthenshire County Council
- Operator: Pembrey West Wales Airport Ltd
- Serves: Llanelli
- Location: Pembrey, Carmarthenshire, Wales, UK
- Elevation AMSL: 15 ft (4.6 m)
- Coordinates: 51°42′50″N 004°18′44″W
- Website: www.pembreyairport.com

Map
- Location in Carmarthenshire

Runways
Direction	Length		Surface
Direction	m	ft	Surface
04/22	797	2,615	Concrete
- Sources: UK AIP at NATS

Pembrey West Wales Airport is 6 NM (11 km; 6.9 mi) west northwest of Llanelli (9 NM (17 km; 10 mi) south of Carmarthen) in Pembrey, Carmarthenshire, in Wales. Pembrey has one hard runway designated as 22LH/C and 04RH/C. The airport and its ICAO code EGFP were withdrawn from the Aeronautical Information Publication in July 2022.

Pembrey airport is inside the Royal Air Force danger area D118 known as Pembrey Sands Air Weapons Range. Pembrey is open seven days a week but only open at weekends unless a prior booking is made, due to an LOA with the MoD to operate civil and commercial flights during operational hours as long as any visiting aircraft obtain the required prior permission required (PPR) from the RAF. The licence has been temporary withdrawn for construction work to be completed on one of the taxiways by the CAA along with taxiway Bravo the APAPI and NDB systems.

== History ==
Construction of the airfield for RAF Flying Training Command started in 1937 and by September 1939, the RAF's No. 2 Air Armament School was the first unit to be stationed at the airfield. By May 1940, the three tarmac runways had been completed.

During World War II Pembrey was an active RAF station and was host to the RAF's Air Gunnery School, after which its activities relaxed a little and it became an air crew holding unit for crews being demobbed. Between 1946 and 1949 RAF Fighter Command was in control of the airfield; work was then put in hand to lengthen Runway 04/22 to take jet aircraft.

From 1949 to 1952 21 Wing RAF Regiment (comprising 15 and 63 Squadrons RAF Regiment) were based at Pembrey. With Runway 04/22 extended to nearly 6000 feet, 233 OCU moved in on 1 September 1952, initially with D.H Vampire aircraft and then with Hawker Hunter aircraft. The unit stayed until 13 July 1957. The airfield closed in September 1957.

Post 1958 part of former RAF Pembrey airfield was turned over to agriculture and part was used as a motor racing circuit. On Thursday 22 August 1997 Pembrey was officially opened as a civil airfield by Captain Winston Thomas at a cost of 3.5 million pounds and named Pembrey West Wales Airport using a single runway (04/22) with a declared length of 805 metres.

On 18 December 2009, Isles of Scilly Skybus operated the first charter flight into the airport. The flight originated from Newquay using a 16-seater aircraft. As of 2010, there were plans to lengthen the runway and lighting arrays to allow larger commercial aircraft to land.

== Airlines and destinations ==
As of 2025, no airlines operate to any scheduled or charter destinations from Pembrey. Airlines that have formerly operated at Pembrey include regional carriers Air Wales, Air Independence and Air Winton.

== See also ==
- RAF Pembrey
- Court Farm, Pembrey
