= Holbeach Air Weapons Range =

Military range in Lincolnshire, England

- Near Gedney Drove End, Lincolnshire in England
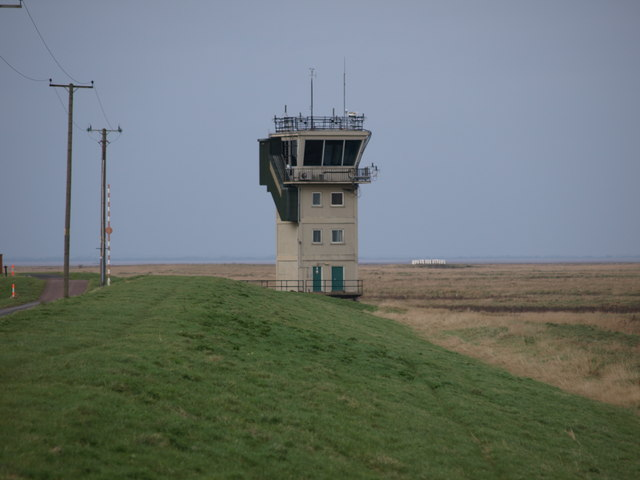
- The range control tower at Holbeach AWR

Site information
- Type: Air weapons range
- Owner: Ministry of Defence
- Operator: Defence Infrastructure Organisation
- Controlled by: Defence Training Estate
- Open to the public: Yes, unless red warning flags or red lights are shown
- Condition: Operational
- No. of targets: Eight
- Website: GOV.UK (Air weapons ranges activity times)

Location
- Location in the Lincolnshire
- Coordinates: 52°51′17.42″N 0°10′14.71″E
- Area: 3,875 hectares (39 km^{2}; 15 sq mi)

Site history
- Built: 1926
- In use: 1926 – present

Garrison information
- Designations: Ramsar site; Site of Special Scientific Interest; Special Areas of Conservation; Special Protection Area

Airfield information
- Identifiers: ICAO: EGYH, WMO: 034690
Helipads
Number	Length and surface
H	15 metres (49 ft)

Holbeach Air Weapons Range is a United Kingdom Ministry of Defence air weapons training range (AWR) situated between Boston and King's Lynn, in the civil parish of Gedney on The Wash, Lincolnshire, eastern England.

The site was originally associated with RAF Sutton Bridge, but was designated Royal Air Force Holbeach in the 1950s. It adopted its current name in the mid-2000s, when operational control was transferred to the Defence Training Estate.

== History ==
The remote air range opened in 1926 as an air gunnery facility established by the Royal Air Force Practice Camp Sutton Bridge (later named RAF Sutton Bridge). Operational use began on 27 September 1926, with biplanes conducting live firing and bombing runs over the area formally designated as "Holbeach Air Gunnery and Bombing Range", and colloquially referred to as Holbeach Marsh Range.

In the late 1950s, following the reduction of RAF Sutton Bridge to a care and maintenance role, the coastal marshland range was renamed RAF Holbeach Bombing Range. It was subsequently parented to RAF Marham as an Air Weapons Range (AWR) under RAF Strike Command.

On 1 April 2006, administrative responsibility for the defence estate was transferred to the Ministry of Defence—Defence Training Estate East (DTE East), based at West Tofts Camp in West Tofts near Thetford in Norfolk. This entity has since been renamed Defence Infrastructure Organisation East (DIO East).

DIO oversees operational support for Holbeach Air Weapons Range, including infrastructure planning, construction, maintenance, and servicing. Local administration is managed by a DIO Training Safety Officer (TSO), who ensures the safe delivery of daily training operations.

RAF Air Command, as the top-level budget holder, retains control of the core RAF station site, which encompasses 716 hectares. The air range control tower is staffed by RAF air traffic control personnel, supported by civilian range staff contracted through Landmarc Solutions.

== Facilities ==
The range covers 3,875 ha (14.96 sq mi), comprising 3,100 hectares of intertidal mudflats and 775 hectares of salt marsh. It provides facilities for RAF and NATO-allied aircraft to conduct weapons training, including aerial bomb drops, rocket and missile firing, and live-fire exercises as part of pre-deployment preparation. Since 1993, activities have expanded to include night bombing and helicopter operations. The range supports precision targeting with high-explosive aerial bombs, precision-guided munitions, and other aircraft-delivered weapons.

Training is undertaken by squadrons based in the United Kingdom and, on occasion, by units flying directly from European airbases. The site features eight static targets, including several decommissioned merchant vessels deliberately beached on the sands of The Wash. Observation towers ("Quadrants") positioned parallel to the target line are staffed and used to calculate ordnance accuracy via triangulation.

Additional infrastructure includes a helipad near the main control tower and, since 2010, the site has included a newly built headquarters building.

Most of the air range, including the control tower and four observation towers (Quadrants), lies within the parish hamlets of Dawsmere and Gedney Drove End, though it also overlaps with Holbeach to the west.

On UK Civil Aviation Authority aeronautical charts, the military Danger Area is marked and identified as restricted airspace under the code WRDA D207/II or the ICAO designation EG D207 (Weapons Range Danger Area or United Kingdom Danger 207). The designated danger altitude typically extends up to 23,000 feet AMSL (Above Mean Sea Level).

== Past activity ==
Holbeach Air Gunnery and Bombing Range has historically supported intensive training activity by a wide variety of British and foreign military aircraft.

Early operations involved now-historic propeller-driven biplanes such as the Armstrong Whitworth Siskin, Hawker Woodcock, Gloster Grebe, Gloster Gamecock, Fairey III, Fairey Flycatcher, Bristol Bulldog, Hawker Fury, and Gloster Gauntlet. These were followed by monoplane and twin-engine types including the Bristol Blenheim, Fairey Battle, Hawker Hurricane, Supermarine Spitfire, de Havilland Mosquito, Westland Lysander, North American P-51 Mustang, and Grumman Avenger.

In the jet era, the range hosted aircraft such as the Gloster Meteor, English Electric Canberra, de Havilland Venom, Hawker Hunter, United States Air Force (USAF) F-100D Super Sabre, Avro Vulcan, Blackburn Buccaneer, McDonnell Douglas F-4 Phantom II, USAF General Dynamics F-111 Aardvark, Harrier jump jet, SEPECAT Jaguar, USAF A-10 Thunderbolt, and Panavia Tornado. Rotary-wing activity has also included the AgustaWestland Apache AH1 (Army Air Corps) and the USAF HH-60G Pave Hawk (56th Rescue Squadron), the latter typically operating in combat search and rescue (CSAR) training scenarios.

== Current activity ==
Currently, aircraft types such as the Eurofighter Typhoon; Lockheed Martin F-35B Lightning II (No. 617 Squadron RAF); USAF McDonnell Douglas F-15 Eagle and F-15E Strike Eagle (48th Fighter Wing); BAE Systems Hawk advanced trainer; Boeing Chinook helicopters (RAF); and Boeing AH-64E Apache helicopters (Army Air Corps) regularly operate on the range.

Additional activity includes occasional flights by the USAF Bell Boeing CV-22B Osprey (7th Special Operations Squadron); USAF Lockheed Martin F-35A Lightning II (495th Fighter Squadron); Leonardo AW159 Wildcat and Merlin helicopters; and legacy Aerospatiale Puma HC variants.

More recently, aircraft making occasional appearances on the range have included the Belgian Air Component and USAF F-16 Fighting Falcon; USAF Boeing B-52 Stratofortress; USAF B-1 Lancer; USAF B-2 Spirit; and Indian Air Force Sukhoi Su-35.

The range also hosts frequent Forward Air Control (FAC) and Joint Terminal Attack Controller (JTAC) exercises.

=== Strafing target courts ===
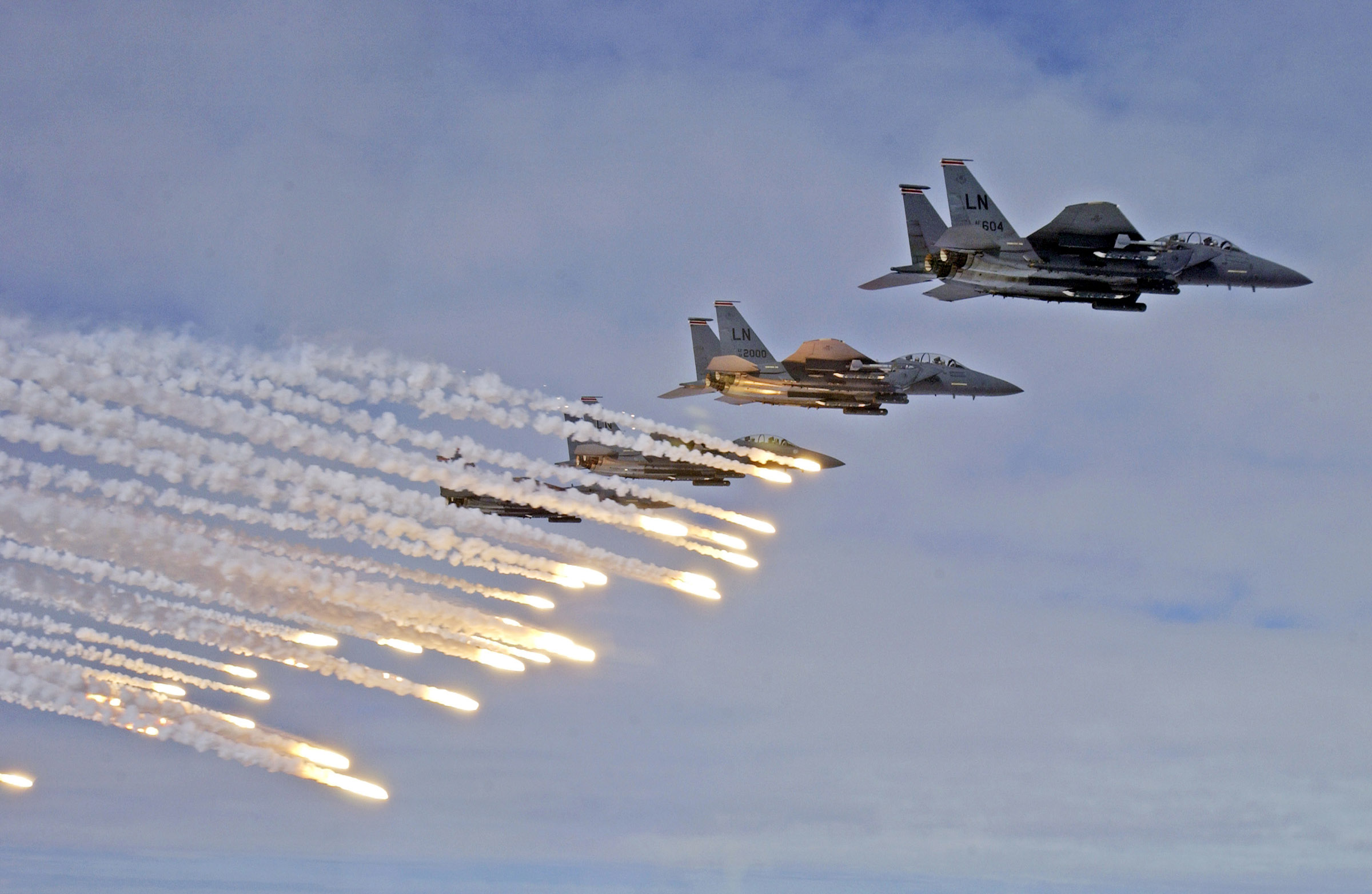
USAF F-15E aircraft seen over the range discharging flares

Holbeach Air Weapons Range includes dedicated strafing courts for scoring aircraft strafing runs—firing passes on ground targets—using acoustic sensor scoring systems. The ground targets consist of several four-metre square nets, each marked with a centrally placed orange bullseye.

The Acoustic Air Weapons Scoring System (AWSS), housed beneath a protective berm, monitors the target screens at high speed, catching the supersonic profile of the incoming projectile, and triangulating its position concurrent with counting the event. It detects the supersonic profile of incoming projectiles, triangulates their impact points, and logs each event in real time. AWSS sensor modes can display rounds per minute rates and the precise location of strafe impacts within the target area. The system also calculates the angle of attack and horizontal approach angle.

Scoring data is transmitted to the control tower, where it is displayed to the Air Traffic Controller for relay to the pilot. The range also features semi-automatic scoring systems for bomb and rocket training.

== Heraldic badge ==
The station's RAF heraldic badge features a vertical sword piercing a crown, enclosed within a circular frame coloured in RAF blue. The inscription reads 'Royal Air Force Station Holbeach', and the motto is Defend and Strike.

== Aircraft incidents ==
=== 1941 ===
On 4 December 1941 at 15:30, Fairey Battle Mk I L5784, operated by No. 56 Operational Training Unit at RAF Sutton Bridge, was engaged in a training exercise at the Holbeach Air Gunnery and Bombing Range. During the sortie, the aircraft overshot its intended target and subsequently force-landed in a nearby field. The pilot, Sergeant G. L. Bradley, was uninjured. The sortie occurred in late afternoon light, shortly before sunset, with conditions approaching civil twilight. Reduced daylight may have affected target acquisition and contributed to the overshoot.

=== 1952 ===
On 21 May 1952, Gloster Meteor F.8 WF745, operated by the Central Gunnery School (CGS) at RAF Leconfield, crashed at Holbeach Air Gunnery and Bombing Range after stalling during a simulated attack on a towed "flag" target. The aircraft entered an uncontrolled dive and impacted the sea. The pilot, Sergeant David Herapath Tinker of No. 613 (City of Manchester) Squadron, Royal Auxiliary Air Force (RAuxAF), was killed.

=== 1953 ===
On 28 July 1953, de Havilland Venom FB.1 WE261, operated by the Central Fighter Establishment (CFE) at RAF West Raynham, suffered a catastrophic in-flight breakup during a ground-attack trial at RAF Holbeach Bombing Range. The aircraft had been airborne for approximately eleven minutes following take-off. During a firing pass over the range, witnesses observed an explosion in the starboard wing root area. The starboard wing mainplane detached, followed by the complete disintegration of the airframe. The pilot, Flight Lieutenant Michael Edward Whitworth-Jones DFC, aged 27, was killed. Whitworth-Jones had been awarded the Distinguished Flying Cross for his service in the Korean War, during which he flew Gloster Meteor F.8s with No. 77 Squadron RAAF in 1952–53. The incident was attributed to structural failure; however, the precise cause could not be determined. It remains possible that the explosion reported by witnesses was the result of a premature detonation of one of the rocket projectiles (RPs) carried under the wing.

=== 1957 ===
On 13 May 1957, Republic F-84F Thunderstreak 52-7103, operated by the 81st Fighter-Bomber Wing at RAF Bentwaters, United States Air Forces Europe (USAFE), crashed at RAF Holbeach Bombing Range during a training exercise. The aircraft entered a steep dive and impacted the ground; the pilot was killed. Further details of the incident are not known.

=== 1960 ===
On 4 April 1960, North American F-100 Super Sabre 56-2994, operated by the 20th Tactical Fighter Wing (20 TFW) at RAF Wethersfield, United States Air Forces Europe (USAFE), crashed at RAF Holbeach Bombing Range during a training exercise. The pilot was killed. No further details of the incident are known.

=== 1963 ===
On 15 July 1963 at 12.45 pm, two North American F-100 Super Sabre aircraft from the 492nd Fighter Squadron, based at RAF Lakenheath, collided mid-air over the RAF Holbeach Bombing Range. First Lieutenant Donald Ware, aged 27, from Idaho, was killed. The surviving pilot, First Lieutenant Marshall, aged 26, was rescued by an RAF helicopter from RAF Coltishall. He resided in Isleham, Cambridgeshire. The RNLI Skegness lifeboat was deployed as part of a search and rescue operation and remained active for four hours.

=== 1979 ===
On 8 November 1979, Hawker Siddeley Harrier GR.3 XV756, operated by No. 1 Squadron RAF at RAF Wittering, crashed at RAF Holbeach Bombing Range during a training exercise. Flight Lieutenant Ross Boyens successfully ejected. Following an RAF investigation, Boyens attributed the incident to engine failure caused by damage from a 30mm target practice (TP) ammunition round fired from his own aircraft during a strafing run. Unlike high-explosive (HE) or armour-piercing (AP) variants, target practice (TP) ammunition is solid and prone to ricochet. The round struck a hard object near the target area and deflected back into the aircraft, damaging the engine blades and causing disintegration. At the time, the aircraft was firing from a position outside the RAF's designated minimum ricochet range—at approximately 610 yards (1,830 ft)—and the incident was subsequently attributed to misfortune. Boyens later served in the Falklands War and, in 1984 at the age of 33, joined the Red Arrows as Red 3. In 1985, he flew as Red 6, one of the Synchro Pair. Originally from New Zealand, he resided in Scothern.

On 12 December 1979, at approximately 7:00 pm, USAF General Dynamics F-111E Aardvark 68-0045, assigned to the 20th Tactical Fighter Wing at RAF Upper Heyford, crashed into the sea in The Wash, within the RAF Holbeach Bombing Range, during a low-toss night practice bombing sortie. Range personnel witnessed the aircraft dive into the water before the crew could activate the escape capsule. Gale-force conditions delayed the discovery of wreckage for two days. Both crew members were killed: Captain Randolph P. Gaspard, aged 31, of Harvey, Louisiana, and Major Frank B. Slusher, aged 35, of Cincinnati, Ohio. A search and rescue operation was conducted involving the RNLI Skegness lifeboat and RAF helicopters from Manston and Coltishall.

=== 1983 ===
On 28 October 1983, Hawker Siddeley Harrier GR.3 XV742, operated by No. 233 Operational Conversion Unit RAF, crashed during a training exercise at RAF Holbeach Bombing Range. The pilot, 24-year-old Flying Officer John Richard Sewell, from Blundellsands, was killed. The aircraft had departed from RAF Wittering and was reportedly struck by a ricochet—possibly from its own 30mm ADEN cannon—during weapons practice. No attempt to eject was made, and the aircraft impacted the ground, resulting in a fatal outcome.

=== 2006 ===
On 24 October 2006, at approximately 11:04 am, Panavia Tornado GR4A ZG711, operated by RAF Marham, crashed into the intertidal mudflats of Holbeach Air Weapons Range during a routine weapons training exercise. The incident was attributed to multiple bird strikes. Both aircrew—pilot and navigator—ejected safely and were recovered by Westland Sea King search and rescue helicopters from RAF Wattisham and RAF Leconfield. They were transported to Queen Elizabeth Hospital, King's Lynn, with non-life-threatening spinal injuries. Ejection was initiated approximately four seconds prior to impact. According to the official investigation report, the crew's injuries were attributed to the limited time available to adopt an appropriate ejection posture.
