= No. 595 Squadron RAF =

- Active: 1 December 1943 – 11 February 1949
- Country: United Kingdom
- Branch: Royal Air Force
- Type: Inactive
- Role: Anti-aircraft co-operation
- Last Base: RAF Pembrey
- Motto(s): Latin: Servi Ballistae (Translation: "Serve the gun")

Insignia
- Squadron Badge: In front of two blunt arrows in saltire, a bat (unofficial)
- Squadron Codes: 7B (Dec 1943 – Feb 1949)

No. 595 Squadron RAF was a squadron of the Royal Air Force from 1943 to 1949.

== History ==
The squadron was formed at RAF Aberporth, Wales on 1 December 1943, from nos. 1607, 1608, 1609 and 1621 Flight for anti-aircraft co-operation duties over central and northern Wales. It operated a variety of aircraft in this role. Due to the ongoing training requirement the squadron was not disbanded at the end of the Second World War and on 27 April 1946 it moved to RAF Fairwood Common, then on 22 October 1946 to RAF Pembrey. The squadron was disbanded at Pembrey on 11 February 1949 when it was renumbered to No. 5 Squadron RAF.

== Aircraft operated ==
Aircraft operated by no. 595 Squadron RAF, data from
| From | To | Aircraft | Version |
|---|---|---|---|
| December 1943 | June 1944 | Hawker Henley | Mk.III |
| December 1943 | July 1944 | Hawker Hurricane | Mk.IIc |
| December 1943 | February 1949 | Miles Martinet | |
| April 1944 | February 1949 | Airspeed Oxford | |
| June 1944 | March 1945 | Hawker Hurricane | Mk.IV |
| November 1944 | July 1945 | Vultee A-31 Vengeance | Mk.IV |
| December 1944 | 1945 | Supermarine Spitfire | Mk.Vb |
| December 1944 | July 1945 | Supermarine Spitfire | Mk.XII |
| July 1945 | 1948 | Supermarine Spitfire | Mk.IX |
| September 1945 | February 1949 | Supermarine Spitfire | LF.XVIe |
| December 1946 | October 1948 | de Havilland Vampire | F.1 |
| June 1948 | February 1949 | Supermarine Spitfire | F.21 |

== Squadron bases ==
data from
| From | To | Base | Remark |
|---|---|---|---|
| 1 December 1943 | 27 April 1946 | RAF Aberporth, Ceredigion | Dets. at RAF Manorbier, Pembrokeshire; Fairwood Common, Gower; RAF Poulton, Cheshire; RAF Wrexham, Wrexham and RAF Brawdy, Pembrokeshire at various times |
| 27 April 1946 | 22 October 1946 | RAF Fairwood Common, Gower | |
| 22 October 1946 | 11 February 1949 | RAF Pembrey, Carmarthenshire | |

== See also ==
- List of Royal Air Force aircraft squadrons
