= Defence Infrastructure Organisation =

Estate management organisation of the Ministry of Defence in the United Kingdom

Agency overview
- Formed: 1 April 2011
- Jurisdiction: United Kingdom
- Headquarters: St George’s House Defence Infrastructure Organisation Head Office DMS Whittington Lichfield Staffordshire United Kingdom
- Agency executive: Mike Green, Chief Executive
- Parent agency: Ministry of Defence
- Website: https://www.gov.uk/government/organisations/defence-infrastructure-organisation

Defence Infrastructure Organisation (DIO) is an operating arm of the Ministry of Defence (MoD) in the United Kingdom, which is responsible for the built and rural estate. Its chief executive is Mike Green.

== History ==
The DIO was formed in 2011 in order to bring together the management of the MoD's estate, to reduce its running costs and create commercial opportunities. It was criticised by the National Audit Office in November 2016 because the performance regime it had set for Capita, its strategic outsourcing partner, was "not fit for purpose" and was failing to incentivise sustainable spending reductions.

== Activities and structure ==
DIO manages around 1.8% of the UK's landmass, including 115,000 non-residential buildings and 50,000 houses.

It is divided into six operating divisions, under the Corporate HQ:

- Hard Facilities Management - Responsible for minor construction projects, mechanical and electrical support to the estate.
- Soft Facilities Management - Responsible for provision of cleaning, catering and contracted support to the estate.
- Major Projects - Responsible for the management of high value or complex projects delivering change in the defence estate.
- Land Management Services - Responsible for managing the freehold and leasehold estate portfolio to deliver best effect for defence.
- Defence Training Estate - operates MOD training installations to train all three services. It is responsible for the management of the 78% of the defence estate allocated as Training Areas and Ranges. It provides sufficient and suitable estate to support the training requirements of the British Armed Forces, whilst ensuring environmental management and appropriate historical and archaeological preservation. Among other activities, DTE currently runs five Air Weapons Ranges for military operational training: the Holbeach and Donna Nook Air Weapons Ranges in Lincolnshire (England), Pembrey Sands Air Weapons Range in Carmarthenshire (Wales), the Tain Air Weapons Range in Rossshire and Cape Wrath in Sutherland (Scotland).
- Security Services Group - Responsible for the provision of physical security advice and support.

The Ministry of Defence Guard Service also remains part of DIO.
