= 1912 East Carmarthenshire by-election =

UK Parliamentary by-election in Wales

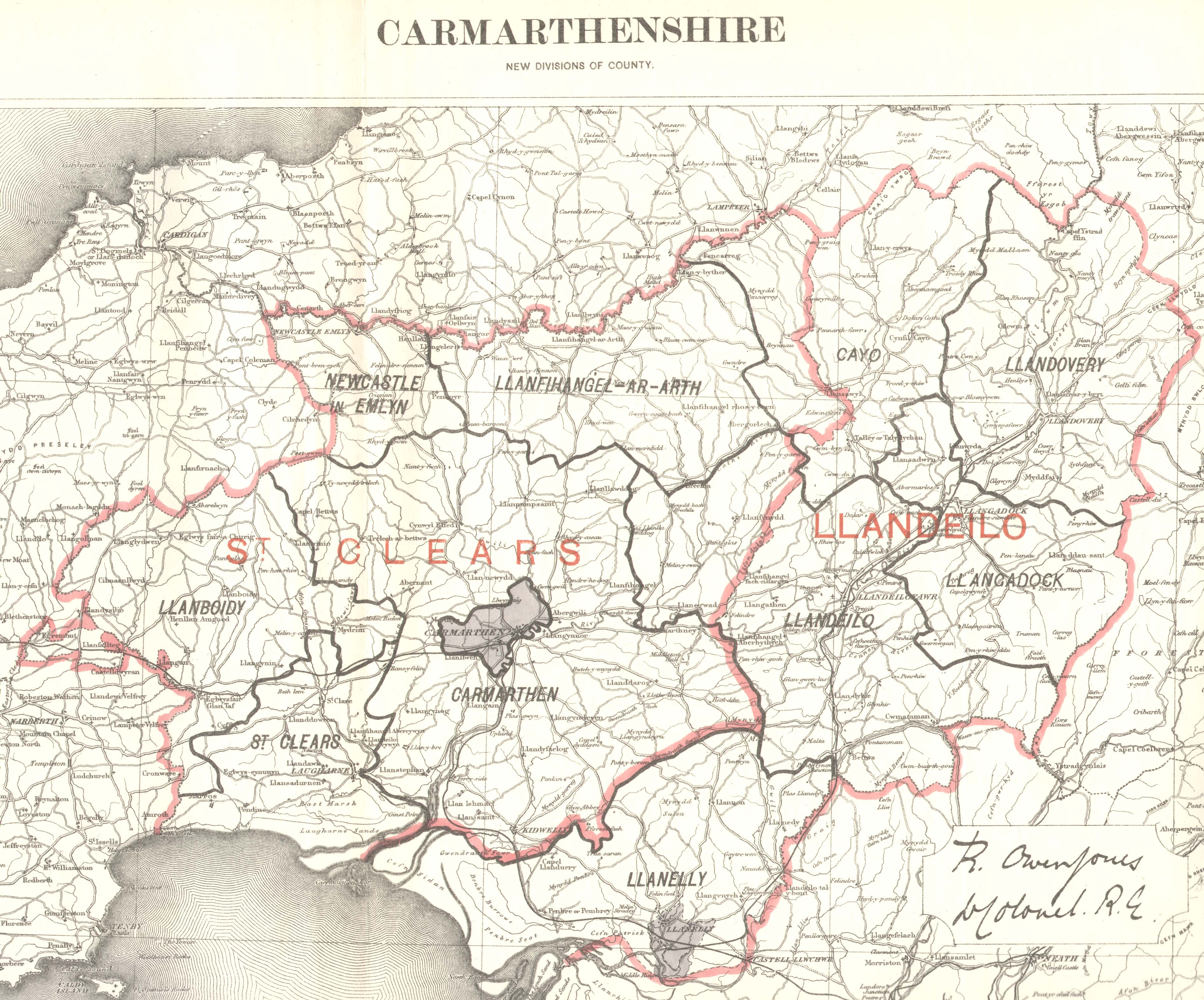
Carmarthenshire showing boundaries for 1885-1918

The 1912 East Carmarthenshire by-election was a Parliamentary by-election held on 22 August 1912. The constituency returned one Member of Parliament (MP) to the House of Commons of the United Kingdom, elected by the first past the post voting system.

== Vacancy ==
Abel Thomas, c1905

The East Carmarthenshire MP since 1890 was the Liberal, Abel Thomas. He died on 23 July 1912, causing the by-election. He had been the MP since holding the seat in the 1890 East Carmarthenshire by-election

== Previous result ==
General election December 1910: East Carmarthenshire
Party	Candidate	Votes	%	±%
Liberal	Abel Thomas	5,825	62.5	−13.1
Conservative	Mervyn Lloyd Peel	2,315	24.8	+0.5
Ind. Labour Party	John Henry Williams	1,176	12.6	N/A
Majority		3,510	37.7	−13.6
Turnout		9,316	75.9	−6.2
Registered electors		12,268		
Liberal hold		Swing		

== Candidates ==
The Liberal candidate chosen to defend the seat was 54-year-old former Congregationalist Minister, Rev. Towyn Jones. For twenty years he had acted as agent for Abel Thomas. A local man, he was prominent in the Welsh Congregational Union and Carmarthenshire civic politics. He was an advocate of the more radical social programme being adopted by the Liberal party. Some local Liberal landowners had tried unsuccessfully to get the local association to select a more conservative and affluent candidate. The Unionists re-adopted local resident and landowner, Mervyn Lloyd Peel. He had been Chairman of East Carmarthenshire Unionist Association since 1907. He was a 56-year-old Barrister, born in Sale, Cheshire, and son of a Carmarthenshire Deputy Lieutenant. Peel was contesting the seat for third consecutive time.

The Independent Labour Party re-adopted 42-year-old Dr John Henry Williams who had also stood here last time. He was a general practitioner in Burry Port, Carmarthenshire. However, the Labour Party nationally did not adopt him as a candidate on this occasion.

== Campaign ==
The Labour campaign got off to a bad start when the South Wales Miners Federation decided not to back Dr Williams, forcing him to rely entirely on the local branch of the Independent Labour Party. Williams criticised the use of the military in the 1911 Llanelli railway strike. Peel, the Unionist candidate, was critical of the Parliament Act 1911 which restricted the powers of the House of Lords. The Unionist campaign received a boost when, on 8 August 1912, they gained Manchester North West from the Liberals.

== Result ==
Towyn Jones

1912 East Carmarthenshire by-election
Party	Candidate	Votes	%	±%
Liberal	Josiah Towyn Jones	6,082	57.8	−4.7
Unionist	Mervyn Lloyd Peel	3,354	31.9	+7.1
Ind. Labour Party	John Henry Williams	1,089	10.3	−2.3
Majority		2,728	25.9	−11.8
Turnout		10,525	80.3	+4.4
Registered electors		13,113		
Liberal hold		Swing	-5.9	

Although the Liberal party share of the vote was down, the result was satisfactory, given that they had a new candidate replacing a long established incumbent. Although the Unionists did not come close to winning, they will have been encouraged by their increased share of the vote. For the Labour party to see their vote go down despite fielding an established local candidate, was a worry particularly when the Liberal government could be associated with some unpopular measures.

== Aftermath ==
A General Election was due to take place by the end of 1915. By the summer of 1914, the following candidates had been adopted to contest that election. Due to the outbreak of war, the election never took place.

General Election 1914/15: East Carmarthenshire Electorate
Party	Candidate	Votes	%	±%
Liberal	Josiah Towyn Jones			
Unionist				
Labour	John Henry Williams			

Under the Representation of the People Act 1918 the East Carmarthenshire seat was abolished, and was replaced by the new seat of Llanelli at the general election of that year.

General election 14 December 1918: Llanelli Electorate
Party	Candidate	Votes	%	±%
Liberal	*Josiah Towyn Jones	16,344	53.1	N/A
Labour	John Henry Williams	14,409	46.9	N/A
Majority		1,935	6.2	N/A
Turnout		30,753	68.9	N/A
Registered electors		30,753		
Liberal win (new seat)				

- Jones was the endorsed candidate of the Coalition Government.
