= East Carmarthenshire =

UK Parliament constituency (1885–1918)

- Former county constituency for the House of Commons
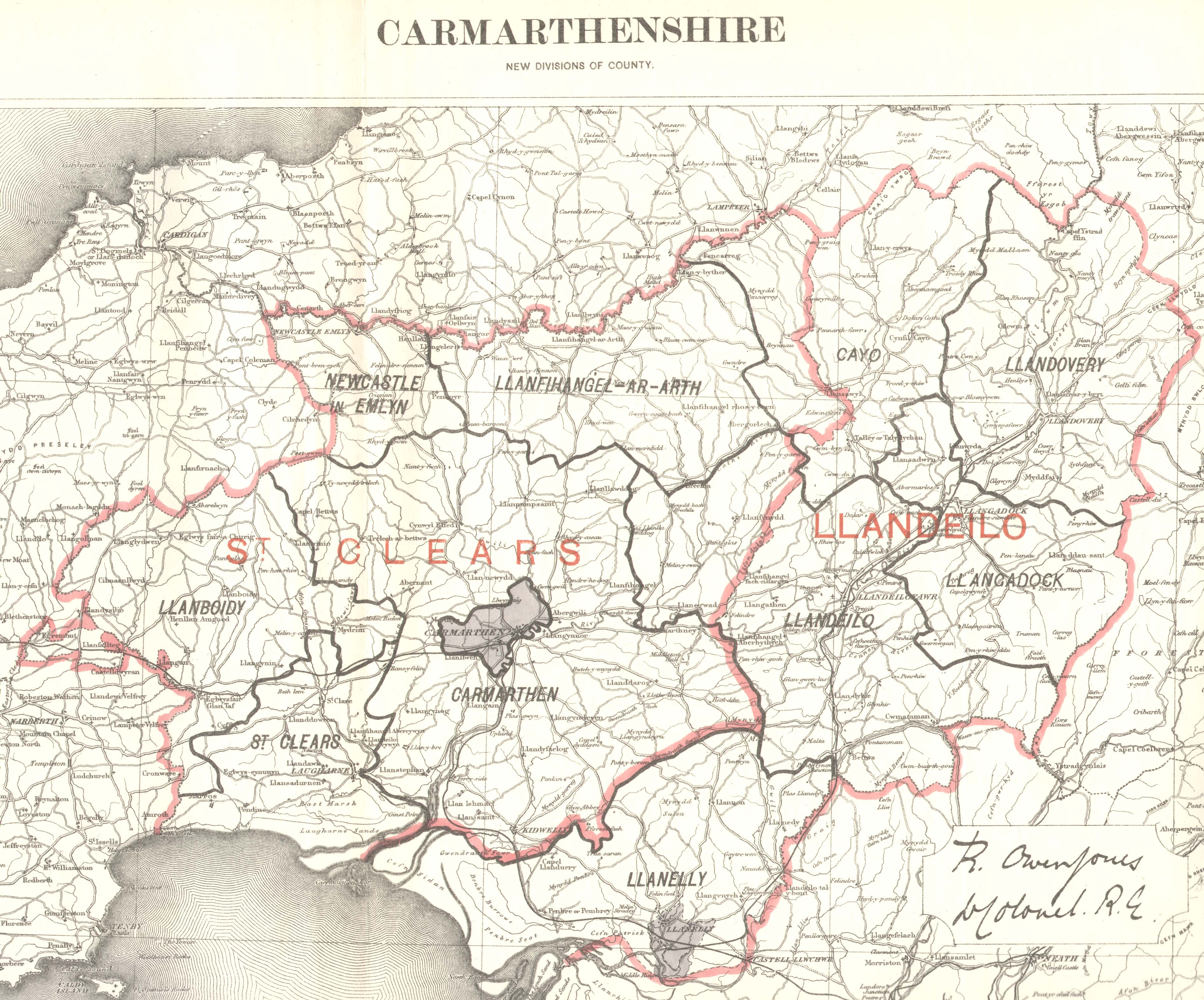
- Carmarthenshire boundaries 1885-1918

1885–1918
- Seats: one
- Created from: Carmarthenshire
- Replaced by: Llanelli

East Carmarthenshire was a county constituency in Carmarthenshire, Wales. It returned one Member of Parliament (MP) to the House of Commons of the Parliament of the United Kingdom, elected by the first past the post voting system.

It was created for the 1885 general election, when the old two-member Carmarthenshire constituency was divided into two new single-member seats: East Carmarthenshire and West Carmarthenshire, both of which were in turn abolished for the 1918 general election.

== Boundaries ==
The constituency included parts of the Sessional Divisions of Llandeilo and Llandovery and the Sessional Division of Llanelly.

== Members of Parliament ==
Year	Member	Party
1885	David Pugh	Liberal
1890	Abel Thomas	Liberal
1912	Towyn Jones	Liberal
1916	Towyn Jones	Coalition Liberal
1918	constituency abolished: see Llanelli	

== History ==
=== 1885-90 ===
Both sitting members for the former Carmarthenshire constituency chose to contest the West Carmarthenshire division, which created an opportunity for a new Liberal candidate in the new Eastern division. It was anticipated that it would produce a strong Liberal vote, primarily in the emerging industrial communities which emerged as a result of the development off the anthracite coal and tinplate industries. The increase in the electorate in these communities was striking. For example, the number of voters in that part of the parish of Llanelli that was outside the borough constituency rose from 615 to 1,500, Similarly, the electorate in Pembrey increased from 377 to 1,000, in Hendy from 190 to 620, in Brynamman from 175 to 450, and in Cwmamman from 164 to 550.

A Liberal association was established in June at a meeting in Ammanford which was addressed by David Pugh, Lewis Morris and John Lloyd Morgan. Pugh had previously served as MP for Carmarthenshire from 1857 until his defeat in 1868, while Morris was a well known literary figure. Morgan was the least known of the three speakers, but as the son of William Morgan, former Principal of the Presbyterian College at Carmarthen, had strong local connections.

Pugh was shortly later selected as candidate. He had been considered to be on the more conservative wing of the Liberal Party but had become increasingly radical in his pronouncements in recent years. The significant increase in the electorate in the industrial portions of the constituency was considered to be the key element in deciding the contest. The electorate of Cwmamman, for example, had increased from 164 to 550 and that of neighbouring Brynamman from 175 to 450. However, the characters of the local Liberal Association was reflected in the choice of Sir Arthur Stepney, who by reason of his influence and wealth was a prominent figure in their ranks, as its first president. Pugh was re-elected in 1886 but in his last years as member there were frequent criticisms at the annual meetings of the Liberal association of Pugh's regular absences from the Commons.

Pugh announced his retirement in June 1890 and died a few weeks later. After a lively series of meetings the Liberal Association chose the Swansea-based lawyer, Abel Thomas as candidate, in preference to the more radical Llanelli businessman, Gwilym Evans. Thomas was returned unopposed after the Conservatives chose not to contest the by-election.

=== 1890-1900 ===
Upon his death in 1890 he was succeeded by Abel Thomas. Within two years, there were criticisms of the new member centred around alleged criticisms of nonconformist ministers and his representing licensed victualers as a barrister. Thomas successfully defended his record and a vote of confidence was passed at the annual meeting of the Liberal Association at Ammanford in June 1892. At the General Election some weeks later, Thomas was unexpectedly opposed by a Liberal Unionist candidate, the Swansea businessman Captain Thomas Davies. It was argued that Davies would gain support from Calvinistic Methodists, who opposed Thomas's links to the liquor trade. However, Thomas won with a large majority.

At the 1895 general election, Thomas was opposed by E.E. Richardson of Glanbrydan Park. Richardson polled better than Davies three years earlier but Thomas still won a comfortable victory. He faced the same opponent at the 1900 general election, once again with a similar result.

=== 1900-1912 ===
Criticisms of Thomas persisted, but he served for twenty two years until his death in 1912. By this time, the first signals of the emergence of the Labour Party were seen in the constituency, but a Labour candidate made little impact at the 1910 general election.

== 1912 by-election ==
Following Thomas's death the favourite to succeed him was the prominent nonconformist minister, Towyn Jones, who had been active in the politics of the constituency since the late 1880s. A somewhat half-hearted attempt was made by some prominent Liberals to select a less radical candidate but these came to nothing.

Mervyn Peel, who had opposed Thomas in 1910, fought a spirited campaign but the Independent Labour Party candidate, Dr J.H. Williams, was denied support by the Labour Party nationally and made a limited impact. Jones was returned with a comfortable majority and remained the member until the constituency was abolished in 1918.

== Election results ==
=== Elections in the 1880s ===
General election 1885: East Carmarthenshire
Party	Candidate	Votes	%
Liberal	David Pugh	4,487	67.9
Conservative	Marteine Lloyd	2,122	32.1
Majority		2,365	35.8
Turnout		6,609	76.2
Registered electors		8,669	
Liberal win (new seat)			

General election 1886: East Carmarthenshire
Party	Candidate	Votes	%	±%
Liberal	David Pugh	Unopposed		
Liberal hold				

=== Elections in the 1890s ===
Pugh's death caused a by-election.

By-election, 8 Aug 1890: East Carmarthenshire
Party	Candidate	Votes	%	±%
Liberal	Abel Thomas	Unopposed		
Liberal hold				

Abel Thomas

General election 1892: East Carmarthenshire
Party	Candidate	Votes	%	±%
Liberal	Abel Thomas	4,439	78.4	N/A
Liberal Unionist	Thomas Davies	1,223	21.6	New
Majority		3,216	56.8	N/A
Turnout		5,662	62.0	N/A
Registered electors		9,136		
Liberal hold		Swing	N/A	

General election 1895: East Carmarthenshire
Party	Candidate	Votes	%	±%
Liberal	Abel Thomas	4,471	64.5	−13.9
Conservative	Ernald Edward Richardson	2,466	35.5	+13.9
Majority		2,005	29.0	−27.8
Turnout		6,937	75.3	+13.3
Registered electors		9,217		
Liberal hold		Swing	-13.9	

=== Elections in the 1900s ===
Abel Thomas

General election 1900: East Carmarthenshire
Party	Candidate	Votes	%	±%
Liberal	Abel Thomas	4,337	66.8	+2.3
Conservative	Ernald Edward Richardson	2,155	33.2	−2.3
Majority		2,182	33.6	+4.6
Turnout		6,492	65.1	−10.2
Registered electors		9,967		
Liberal hold		Swing	+2.3	

General election 1906: East Carmarthenshire
Party	Candidate	Votes	%	±%
Liberal	Abel Thomas	Unopposed		
Liberal hold				

=== Elections in the 1910s ===
General election January 1910: East Carmarthenshire
Party	Candidate	Votes	%	±%
Liberal	Abel Thomas	7,619	75.7	N/A
Conservative	Mervyn Lloyd Peel	2,451	24.3	New
Majority		5,168	51.4	N/A
Turnout		10,070	82.1	N/A
Registered electors		12,268		
Liberal hold		Swing	N/A	

General election December 1910: East Carmarthenshire
Party	Candidate	Votes	%	±%
Liberal	Abel Thomas	5,825	62.6	−13.1
Conservative	Mervyn Lloyd Peel	2,315	24.8	+0.5
Independent Labour	John Henry Williams	1,176	12.6	New
Majority		3,510	37.8	−13.6
Turnout		9,316	75.9	−6.2
Registered electors		12,268		
Liberal hold		Swing	-6.8	

Towyn Jones

1912 East Carmarthenshire by-election
Party	Candidate	Votes	%	±%
Liberal	Towyn Jones	6,082	57.8	−4.8
Unionist	Mervyn Lloyd Peel	3,354	31.9	+7.1
Ind. Labour Party	John Henry Williams	1,089	10.3	−2.3
Majority		2,728	25.9	−11.9
Turnout		10,525	80.3	+4.4
Registered electors		13,113		
Liberal hold		Swing	-5.9	
