= Burry Port Urban District =

Former district in Carmarthenshire, Wales

The Burry Port Urban District was an urban district covering the town of Burry Port in Carmarthenshire between 1903 and 1974, when it was absorbed into the District of Llanelli.

The first election was held in May 1903 after Carmarthenshire County Council agreed to establish new urban districts at Ammanford and Burry Port.

John Henry Williams was a chairman of the council.

== Premises ==
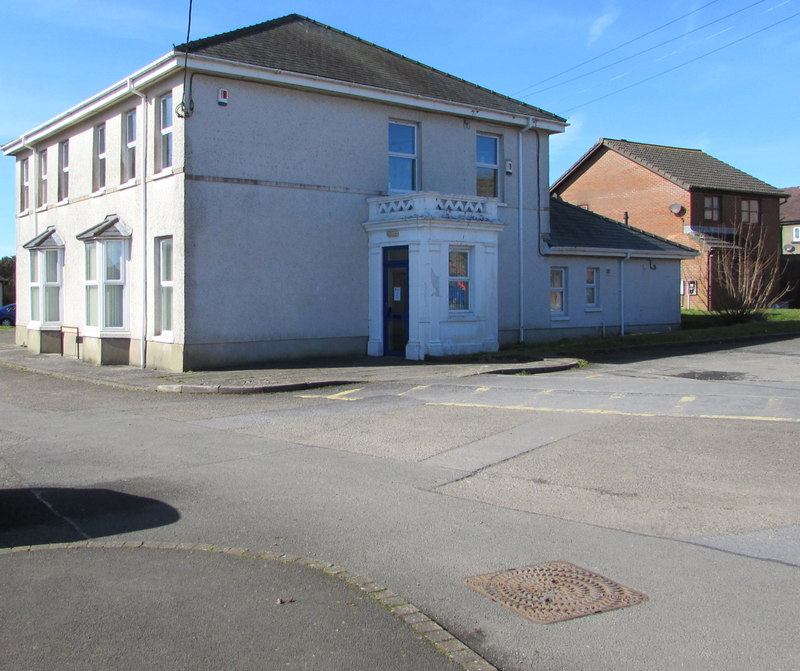
Bryn-y-Môr House: Council's headquarters after 1949

Until 1949 the council was based at Somerset House, at the corner of Station Road and Parkes Street (which was subsequently occupied by the Royal British Legion). In 1949, the council bought Bryn-y-Môr House (or Brynmor House) at the western end of Carway Street to serve as its headquarters instead. The building had been built around 1900 as a pair of semi-detached houses but had been converted into one house some years before the council purchased it. Following the council's abolition in 1974 the building was converted into the town's library.

== Election results ==
=== 1903 Election ===
Elected: Thos F. Wilkins White, leadworks manager 452; A. A. Lewis, tinplate works manager 362; William M. Howell, solicitor 346; D. Williams, builder 340; E. J. Bowen, tinplate manufacturer 339; E. E. Evans, accountant 334; T. Williams, bar cutter 327; Rev. J. H. Rees (Congregational Minister) 323; William Howell, fitter; 270 D Charles, chemist 256; D. Hughes, colliery manager 238; R. T. Hammond, agent 236; Robert Williams, salesman 227; Thomas Griffith. coal merchant 219; J. R. Griffiths, cashier 214.

Non-elected: William Bevan. brewers agent, 138; Thomas Bevnon, builder, 133; M. I. Davies. draper. 91; Thomas Davies, tailor, 68; Francis J. Evans, shipbroker, 135; Joseph Griffith, smelter. 87; Thomas Hughes, tailor, 147; Phillip Jones, sawyer, 194; Arthur Morgan, manager, 163; Fred. J Morgan, clerk. 193; John Rees, shoemaker, 177; W. B. Roderick, solicitor, 198.

== 1905 Election ==
J.H. Williams, a local doctor and future Labour MP for Llanelli was elected as a Progressive at the head of the poll.

Burry Port Urban District 1905
Party	Candidate	Votes	%	±%
Progressive	J.H. Williams	397		
Progressive	H.J. Brown	330		
Progressive	Rev J.H. Rees*	318		
Progressive	W. Howell*	275		
Conservative	Thomas Evans	245		
Progressive	R.T. Hammond*	184		
Conservative	W.M. Griffiths	163		
Progressive	D. Hugh	157		
Progressive	E. Evans	147		
Progressive	J. Eager	95		

== 1906 Election ==
A.A. Lewis was returned at the head of the poll.

Burry Port Urban District 1906
Party	Candidate	Votes	%	±%
	A.A. Lewis*	459		
	W.T. Edmunds	368		
	David Williams*	335		
	Mervyn Howell*	277		
	Joseph Williams	268		
	John Edwards	231		
	R. Roberts	206		
	David Howell	157		
	Philip Eynon	138		
	Archibald Badger	89		
	William Bevan	81		
	Charles Tottenham	31		

== 1907 Election ==
Elected: R.G. Thomas 529; F.J. Evans 415; R. Roberts 361; *R.T. Hammond 354; J. Leyshon 296.

Non-Elected: J. Rowlands 229; Jophn Edwards 164; Philip Eynon 130.

== 1909 Election ==
Six members were returned due to an occasional vacancy.

Burry Port Urban District 1909
Party	Candidate	Votes	%	±%
	Hume Buckley Roderick	399		
	John Rowlands	390		
	James McDowell	369		
	David Evans	300		
	Thomas Hughes	289		
	Thomas Beynon	266		
	Griffith P. Williams	238		
