= 1973 Llanelli Borough Council election =

Welsh local election

The first election to Llanelli Borough Council was held in April 1973. It was followed by the 1976 election. On the same day there were elections to the other District local authorities and community councils in Wales.

== Results ==
=== Llanelli Borough Ward One (three seats) ===
Ward One 1973
Party	Candidate	Votes	%	±%
Independent	Harry J. Richards	1,413		
Labour	R. Palmer	1,276		
Labour	D. Thomas	1,229		
Labour	D. Williams	1,083		
Liberal	E. Clarke	920		
Independent win (new seat)				
Labour win (new seat)				
Labour win (new seat)				

=== Llanelli Borough Ward Two (three seats) ===
Ward Two 1973
Party	Candidate	Votes	%	±%
Labour	W.M. Jones	1,437		
Labour	D.H.R. Jones	1,347		
Labour	R.T. Peregrine	1,263		
Plaid Cymru	E. Jones	620		
Plaid Cymru	Dyfrig Thomas	466		
Plaid Cymru	P. Davies	437		
Labour win (new seat)				
Labour win (new seat)				
Labour win (new seat)				

=== Llanelli Borough Ward Three (three seats) ===
Ward Three 1973
Party	Candidate	Votes	%	±%
Labour	T.G. Thomas	1,295		
Labour	John Gladwyn Hill	1,166		
Labour	T. Evans	1,152		
Liberal	W. Tilleke	739		
Democratic Labour	I.C. Rosser	564		
Labour win (new seat)				
Labour win (new seat)				
Labour win (new seat)				

=== Llanelli Borough Ward Four (three seats) ===
Ward Four 1973
Party	Candidate	Votes	%	±%
Labour	G, Every	1,274		
Labour	W. Griffiths	1,193		
Independent Labour	I. Roberts	1,164		
Labour	C. Edwards	1,025		
Labour win (new seat)				
Labour win (new seat)				
Independent Labour win (new seat)				

=== Llanelli Borough Ward Five (three seats) ===
This ward included Kidwelly and Trimsaran

Ward Five 1973
Party	Candidate	Votes	%	±%
Labour	Gwilym Glanmor Jones	1,686		
Labour	H. Hughes	1,601		
Labour	F. Owens	1,558		
Independent	W. King	1,129		
Labour win (new seat)				
Labour win (new seat)				
Labour win (new seat)				

=== Llanelli Borough Ward Six (three seats) ===
This ward covered Burry Port.

Ward Six 1973
Party	Candidate	Votes	%	±%
Labour	R.J. James	1,353		
Independent	G. Thomas	1,125		
Labour	J. Gething	969		
Independent	A. Phillips	872		
Labour	I. Jones	712		
Independent	G. West	632		
Plaid Cymru	F. Morgan	259		
Labour win (new seat)				
Independent win (new seat)				
Labour win (new seat)				

=== Llanelli Borough Ward Seven (three seats) ===
This ward covered Llanedi and Llangennech

Ward Seven 1973
Party	Candidate	Votes	%	±%
Labour	R.H.V. Lewis	2,108		
Labour	G.J. Jones*	1,968		
Labour	L. Davies	1,948		
Independent	F. Price	1,099		
Labour win (new seat)				
Labour win (new seat)				
Labour win (new seat)				

=== Llanelli Borough Ward Eight (three seats) ===
Ward Eight 1973
Party	Candidate	Votes	%	±%
Labour	A. Bowen	1,989		
Labour	Henry John Evans	1,970		
Labour	L.R. McDonagh	1,915		
Communist	R.E. Hitchon	744		
Labour win (new seat)				
Labour win (new seat)				
Labour win (new seat)				

=== Llanelli Borough Ward Nine (three seats) ===
Ward Nine 1973
Party	Candidate	Votes	%	±%
Labour	J. Davies	unopposed		
Labour	N. Jenkins	unopposed		
Labour	E. Thomas	unopposed		
Labour win (new seat)				
Labour win (new seat)				
Labour win (new seat)				

=== Llanelli Borough Ward Ten (three seats) ===
Ward Ten 1973
Party	Candidate	Votes	%	±%
Labour	D. Lewis	unopposed		
Labour	D. Thomas	unopposed		
Labour	E. Thomas	unopposed		
Labour win (new seat)				
Labour win (new seat)				
Labour win (new seat)				

=== Llanelli Borough Ward Eleven (three seats) ===
Ward Eleven 1973
Party	Candidate	Votes	%	±%
Labour	S. Davies	2,843		
Ratepayers	T. Morris	2,510		
Labour	Chris McLoughlin	2,414		
Labour	F. Davies	2,035		
Labour win (new seat)				
Ratepayers win (new seat)				
Labour win (new seat)				
