= Margaretta Williams =

Welsh lecturer and linguist (1933–2018)

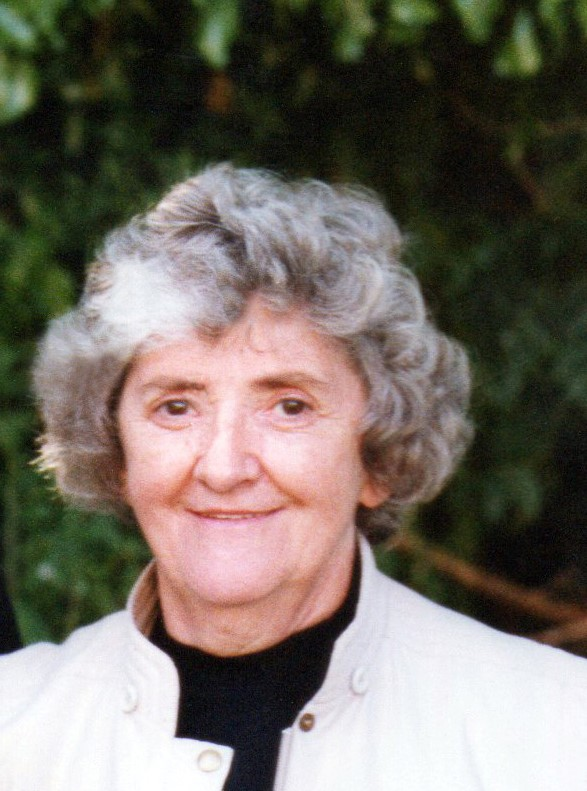
Margaretta (Rita) Williams

Margaretta (Rita) Williams (1933-2018) was a Welsh academic, lexicographer, Celtic linguist, translator and Breton scholar. She was elected an Honorary Member of the Welsh Gorsedd in 1994. She was awarded the Breton Order of the Ermine award in 1996 for her championing of the Welsh and Breton languages and literature over many decades.

== Life and career ==
Margaretta (Rita) Williams was born Margaretta Morgan in 1933 in Cwmgors, Glamorganshire. She grew up in the neighbouring mining village of Gwaun-Cae-Gurwen. She was the third daughter of Gwennie Morgan (née Williams 1903-1976), a housewife, and William Morgan, (1898-1961), a miner. Rita’s health was never good as she suffered from bronchiectasis and celiac disease. She went to the local village school and then attended Pontardawe Grammar School when Isaac 'Eic' Davies (1909-1993) was a Welsh teacher there.

In 1955, she graduated in Welsh with a first-class degree from the University College of Wales, Aberystwyth. She went on to do research into Middle Breton syntax, gaining an MA degree in 1958. A senior research fellowship from the University of Wales allowed her to study Late Breton at the Celtic Department, University of Brittany in Rennes. She then completed a Ph.D on 'The Preposition in Late Breton' in Aberystwyth.

From 1956-7, she worked as a youth organizer for Urdd Gobaith Cymru in Carmarthen. She then taught in Ystalyfera Grammar School and Pantycelyn High School, Llanydovery, before becoming a lecturer in Breton, Cornish, Irish and Welsh literature at Coleg Dewi Sant, Lampeter in 1966. She met a Baptist minister, the Rev. Carl Williams (1938-2017), while doing voluntary work and married him in 1969. The two of them carried out chapel duties in Fishguard, published a local paper (Y Llien Gwyn), taught Welsh to adults and organized town twinning trips to and from Brittany. Rita also contributed to the editorial of Seren Cymru, the periodical of the Baptist Union of Wales.

After the death of J.R.F Piette (Arzel Even) in 1972 she started work at the University College of Wales, Aberystwyth, teaching Breton Studies, Late Breton, Middle Breton and Middle Cornish. She also worked at Coleg Dewi Sant, Llanbedr-Pont-Steffan, until she retired in 1987. As there were few materials or resources, either in English or Welsh, for students of the Breton language and literature, she published dictionaries: Geiriadur Bach Bredaweg-Cymraeg (1984), Geiriadur Brezhonek-Kembraek (1984); and an introductory textbook on Breton (1981), which was adapted from a manual by Pêr Denez. Williams translated a number of works from Breton to Welsh including short stories by Roparz Hemon, Ronan Huon, Abeozen, and Pêr Denez. She also translated a novel by Roparz Hemon, and drama and poems by Naig Rozmor.

Her collaboration with Pêr Denez not only involved discussion of publications and translations, but also education, work for their respective minority cultures and the organization of twinning trips between Wales and Brittany.

Williams often stayed in Brittany and at the Oriant Inter-Celtic Festival in August 1975, she gave a speech on Wales. In 1983, she gave two series of lectures in Breton at Rennes University under the auspices of the British Council. After her retirement, she continued as an external examiner for the Welsh Language Department at Cardiff University, and for the Welsh Language Department at Trinity College, Carmarthen. She created a new Breton-Welsh dictionary which was put online by Dyfrig Berry in 2023.

She promoted friendship between Wales and Brittany. She was admitted to the Gorsedd Beirdd Ynys Prydain in Wales in 1994, and received the Urzh an Erminig, the Order of the Ermine prize in Brittany, in 1996. Williams died on 3 September 2018 in Llanelli Hospital.

== Selected publications ==
- Stories from the Breton (Llandysul: Gomer, 1979)
- Introducing Breton (Cardiff: University of Wales Press, 1981)
- With Gwyn Griffiths, Tangi Malmanche Dramas (Christopher Davies, 1982)
- Little Breton - Welsh Dictionary (Aberystwyth: Canolfan Uwchefrydiau Cymreig a Celtaidd, 1984)
- Brezhonek-Kembraek Dictionary (Lannion: Hor Yezh, 1984)
