= Kidwelly Town Hall =

Municipal Building in Kidwelly, Wales

- Neuadd y Dref Cydweli (Welsh)
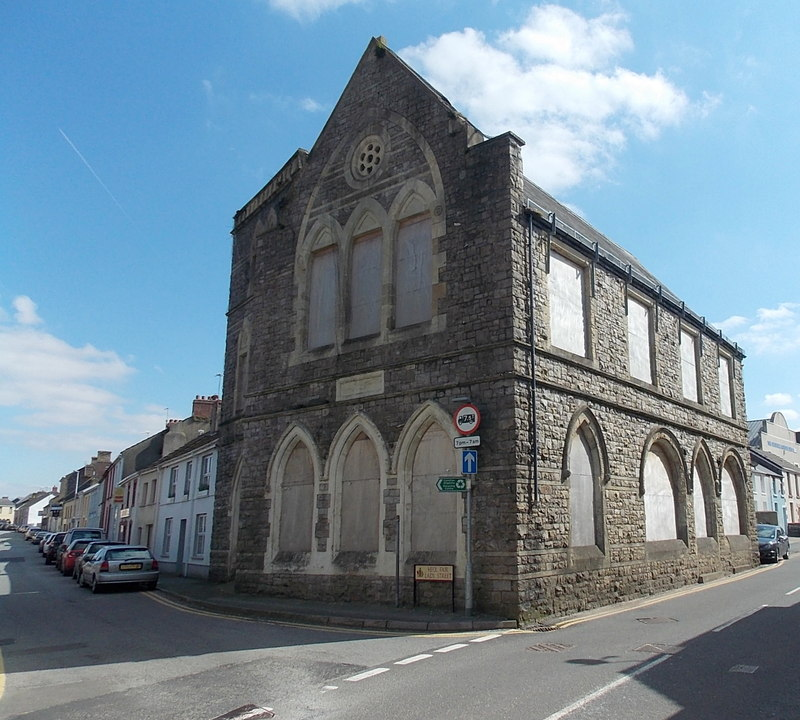
- Kidwelly Town Hall

- Shown in Carmarthenshire
- 51.7363°N 4.3069°W
- Location: Lady Street, Kidwelly

History
- Built: 1878

Site notes
- Architect: Thomas William Angel Evans
- Architectural style: Gothic Revival style

Listed Building – Grade II
- Official name: Kidwelly Town Hall
- Designated: 24 May 1977
- Reference no.: 11880

Kidwelly Town Hall (Welsh: Neuadd y Dref Cydweli) is a municipal building in Lady Street, Kidwelly, Carmarthenshire, Wales. The structure, which was last used as a public library but is currently vacant, is a Grade II listed building.

== History ==
The building was designed by a former mayor of the borough, Thomas William Angel Evans, in the Gothic Revival style, built in rubble masonry with stone dressings and was completed in 1878.

The design involved an asymmetrical main frontage of two bays facing onto Lady Street. The left-hand bay, which formed an entrance tower, featured an arched doorway with an archivolt and a hood mould on the ground floor, three arched windows with roundels in the heads on the first floor and two arched windows with roundels in the heads on the second floor. There was a date stone above the entrance. The right-hand bay contained three arched windows on the ground floor, three arched windows with triangles in the heads on the first floor, and an oculus with plate tracery under a large arch in the gable above. The side elevation, with four bays extending along Causeway Street, was fenestrated by arched windows on the ground floor and by square-headed windows on the first floor. Internally, the principal rooms were a market hall and some prison cells on the ground floor and an assembly room and a reading room on the first floor.

The borough council, which met in the town hall, was reformed under the Municipal Corporations Act 1883. The building was used as the venue for recruiting drives during the Second Boer War and the First World War.

The building was the location for the inquest, in June 1920, into the death of Mabel Greenwood during which her husband, the local solicitor, Harold Greenwood, was accused of murdering her by administering arsenic. At the subsequent trial, the prosecution failed to convince the jury that Harold Greenwood was guilty and he was acquitted in November 1920.

The building was used again as a recruiting station during the Second World War. It continued to serve as the meeting place of the borough council, but ceased to be the local seat of government when the enlarged Llanelli District Council was formed in 1974. It subsequently served as the home of the Kidwelly Library until the library service moved to Bridge Street in 2002. Since then the building has remained vacant and deteriorating and, in June 2011, it was placed on the annual catalogue of buildings at risk published by Save Britain's Heritage. Carmarthenshire County Council sought purchasers who would develop the building in October 2019.
