= 1936 Llanelli by-election =

UK Parliamentary by-election in Wales

The 1936 Llanelli by-election was held on 26 March 1936. The by-election was held due to the death of the incumbent Labour MP, John Henry Williams. It was won by the Labour candidate Jim Griffiths.

1936 Llanelli by-election
Party	Candidate	Votes	%	±%
Labour	Jim Griffiths	32,188	66.8	N/A
Liberal National	William Albert Jenkins	15,967	33.3	N/A
Majority		16,221	33.5	N/A
Turnout		48,155	68.4	N/A
Registered electors		70,380		
Labour hold		Swing		
