= Towyn Jones =

Welsh politician (1858–1925)

Member of Parliament for Llanelli East Carmarthenshire (1912–1918)
- In office 22 August 1912 – 15 November 1922
- Preceded by: Abel Thomas
- Succeeded by: John Henry Williams

Personal details
- Born: 28 December 1858 New Quay, Cardiganshire, Wales, United Kingdom
- Died: 16 November 1925 (aged 66)
- Party: Liberal

Josiah Towyn Jones (28 December 1858 – 16 November 1925) was a Welsh clergyman and Liberal Party politician. He was Member of Parliament (MP) for Carmarthenshire East and later for Llanelli.

He was born in New Quay, Cardiganshire, and began work as a farm labourer aged 11. A year later he went to sea as a cabin boy, later working as a ship's cook and steward.

In 1876 he entered the Presbyterian College, Carmarthen. In 1880 he became a Congregationalist minister at Dowlais near Merthyr Tydfil. In 1884 he began a 22-year spell as minister at Cwmamman in the Amman Valley, Carmarthenshire. At this time he was a close political associate of leading Welsh Liberals Tom Ellis and David Lloyd George.

He married Mary Howells of Plas Cadwgan in the Swansea Valley in 1885 and they had two daughters.

In the late 1880s he emerged as a critic of local Liberal MP David Pugh. For twenty years he acted as agent for Abel Thomas, Liberal MP for Carmarthenshire East.

Towyn Jones was a leading critic of the Education Committee of Carmarthenshire County Council in relation to the conflict between anglicans and nonconformists. In 1904, following the elevation of W.N. Jones to the aldermanic bench, a county council by-election was called in the Betws division. Towyn Jones consented to stand after two public meetings at Ammanford and in Cwmamman and was expected to be returned unopposed. However, he was opposed by David John Jones, an Ammanford ironmonger and a prominent Congregationalist, who refused to withdraw. After a contest between two Liberals which involved the local MP, Abel Thomas, Towyn Jones was elected by a relatively comfortable majority. He did not seek re-election as a county councillor in 1907

When Abel Thomas died in 1912, Towyn Jones replaced him at the ensuing by-election. Under the Representation of the People Act 1918 the East Carmarthenshire seat was abolished, and he was instead elected as MP for the new seat of Llanelli at the general election of that year, retiring at the 1922 election.

During World War I, he opposed conscription, but nevertheless took office in the coalition government, becoming a Whip and Junior Lord of the Treasury. When the Welsh Guards were formed during the war he enthusiastically helped in recruiting for the new regiment.

Parliament of the United Kingdom
Preceded by Abel Thomas	Member of Parliament for Carmarthenshire East; 1912 – 1918	Constituency abolished
New constituency	Member of Parliament for Llanelli; 1918 – 1922	Succeeded by John Henry Williams
