= Llanelli (UK Parliament constituency) =

UK Parliament constituency (1918–)

Coordinates: 51°43′14″N 4°13′33″W

- County constituency for the House of Commons
- Boundary of Llanelli in Wales
- Preserved county: Dyfed
- Electorate: 69,895 (March 2020)
- Major settlements: Llanelli, Burry Port, Llangennech

Current constituency
- Created: 1918
- Member of Parliament: Nia Griffith (Labour)
- Seats: One
- Created from: East Carmarthenshire

Overlaps
- Senedd: Sir Gaerfyrddin

Llanelli is a constituency of the House of Commons of the Parliament of the United Kingdom. (Note: A county constituency (for the purposes of election expenses and type of returning officer)) From 1918 to 1970 the official spelling of the constituency name was Llanelly. It elects one Member of Parliament (MP) by the first past the post system of election. It has been represented since 2005 by Nia Griffith of the Labour Party.

The Llanelli Senedd constituency was created with the same boundaries in 1999 (as an Assembly constituency).

The constituency retained its name and gained wards, as part of the 2023 review of Westminster constituencies and under the June 2023 final recommendations of the Boundary Commission for Wales for the 2024 general election.

== Boundaries ==
1918–1950: The constituency was established in 1918, as a division of Carmarthenshire, located in the south east of the county. This area had, until 1918, been the southern part of the constituency of East Carmarthenshire.

It consisted of the then local authority areas of the Municipal Borough of Llanelly; the Urban Districts of Ammanford, Burry Port and Cwmamman; the Rural Districts of Lanelly and part of Llandilofawr (namely the civil parishes of Betws, Llandybie and Quarter Bach, and Ward I of the civil parish of Llandilo Rural)

The division bordered Carmarthen to the west and north, Brecon and Radnor to the north east, Neath to the east, Gower to the south east and the sea to the south.

1950–1974: In the next redistribution of constituencies in Wales, which took effect in 1950, the northern boundary of the constituency was slightly altered. Llanelly no longer bordered Brecon and Radnor and Gower was extended north and took over the part of the 1918 Neath constituency that had previously adjoined Carmarthenshire. The constituency area continued to include the same local authorities as in 1918 (apart from a spelling change to Llandilo for the part RDC included):

- The borough of Llanelly;
- The urban districts of Ammanford, Burry Port and Cwmamman;
- The rural district of Llanelly and the parish of Bettws in the rural district of Llandilo.

At the 1970 general election the official spelling of the constituency name was altered to Llanelli. This followed the change in name of both the borough and rural district in 1966.

1974–1983: The constituency appears to have been unchanged by the redistribution. The local authorities remained the same (apart from spelling changes):

- The borough of Llanelli;
- the urban districts of Ammanford, Burry Port and Cwmamman;
- the rural district of Llanelli and the parish of Bettws in the rural district of Llandeilo.

The substantial local government changes which took effect in 1974 did not affect this redistribution as it used the boundaries as they existed in November 1970 to construct parliamentary constituencies.

1983–1997: The redistribution altered the constituency by 8.4%. 96.2% of the new constituency had been in the old one. 3.8% of the electors came from the former Carmarthen constituency.

The area now formed part of the new county of Dyfed. The district level local government units contained in the constituency were the Borough of Llanelli and Wards 2–6 and 9 of the Borough of Dinefwr.

1997–2010: In this redistribution the constituency was reduced so that it covered the same area as the Borough of Llanelli.

2010–2024: With effect from the United Kingdom general election in May 2010, the constituency comprised the Carmarthenshire County electoral wards of Bigyn, Burry Port, Bynea, Dafen, Elli, Felinfoel, Glanymor, Glyn, Hendy, Hengoed, Kidwelly, Llangennech, Llannon, Lliedi, Llwynhendy, Pembrey, Pontyberem, Swiss Valley, Trimsaran, Tycroes, and Tyisha.

The constituency included the whole of 9 Carmarthenshire communities (Kidwelly; Llanedi; Llanelli; Llanelli Rural; Llangennech; Llannon; Pembrey and Burry Port Town; Pontyberem; and Trimsaran).

Interactive map of current boundaries

2024–present: Under the 2023 review, drawn up in accordance with the ward structure in existence on 1 December 2020, the constituency was defined as comprising the wards above, plus Gorslas, Llangyndeyrn and St.Ishmael, transferred from the abolished constituency of Carmarthen East and Dinefwr.

Following a local government boundary review which came into effect in May 2022, the constituency now comprises the following wards of the County of Carmarthenshire from the 2024 general election:

- Bigyn, Burry Port, Bynea, Dafen and Felinfoel, Elli, Glanymor, Glyn, Gorlas, Hendy, Hengoed, Kidwelly and St. Ishmael, Llangennech, Llangyndeyrn, Llannon, Lliedi, Llwynhendy, Pembrey, Pontyberem, Swiss Valley, Trimsaran, Tycroes, and Tyisha.

== History ==
Llanelli has traditionally been an ultra-safe Labour seat, with a Labour MP representing the constituency since 1922. It was represented by one-time deputy leader of the Labour Party, Jim Griffiths, from 1936 until his retirement in 1970. In recent years however Labour's majority had been somewhat eroded by Plaid Cymru, who as of 2021 have won the equivalent seat in the Senedd in two of the six Senedd elections to date. At the 2015 general election, however, the Labour majority increased once again and in 2017 it increased further to nearly 30% with the Conservatives replacing Plaid Cymru in second place. At the 2019 general election, there was a swing of 8.8% from Labour to Conservative but the latter's vote collapsed in 2024, allowing Reform UK to take second place and reducing Labour's majority to 1,504 (3.7%).

== Members of Parliament ==
Election	Member	Party
1918	Towyn Jones	Coalition Liberal
1922	Towyn Jones	National Liberal
1922	John Henry Williams	Labour
1936 by-election	Jim Griffiths	Labour
1970	Denzil Davies	Labour
2005	Nia Griffith	Labour

== Elections ==
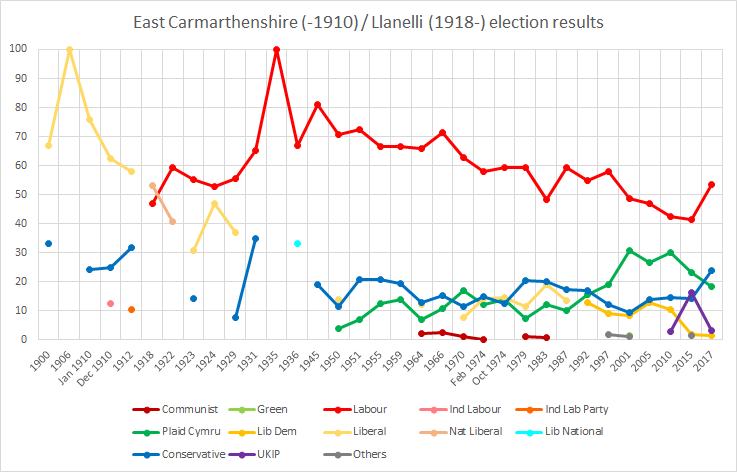
Llanelli election results

=== Elections in the 1910s ===
Jones

General election 1918: Llanelly
Party		Candidate	Votes	%
C	National Liberal	Josiah Towyn Jones	16,344	53.1
	Labour	John Williams	14,409	46.9
Majority			1,935	6.2
Turnout			30,753	68.9
Registered electors			30,753	
	National Liberal win (new seat)			
C indicates candidate endorsed by the coalition government.

=== Elections in the 1920s ===
General election 1922: Llanelly
Party	Candidate	Votes	%	±%
Labour	John Williams	23,213	59.3	+12.4
National Liberal	George Clark Williams	15,947	40.7	−12.4
Majority		7,266	18.6	N/A
Turnout		39,160	80.3	+11.4
Registered electors		49,795		
Labour gain from National Liberal		Swing	+12.4	

General election 1923: Llanelly
Party	Candidate	Votes	%	±%
Labour	John Williams	21,603	55.1	−4.2
Liberal	Richard Thomas Evans	11,765	30.7	−10.0
Unionist	Lionel Beaumont-Thomas	5,442	14.2	N/A
Majority		9,298	24.4	+5.8
Turnout		38,810	76.8	−3.5
Registered electors		49,825		
Labour hold		Swing		

General election 1924: Llanelly
Party	Candidate	Votes	%	±%
Labour	John Williams	20,516	52.9	−2.8
Liberal	Richard Thomas Evans	18,259	47.1	+16.4
Majority		2,259	5.8	−18.6
Turnout		38,775	75.7	−1.8
Registered electors		51,213		
Labour hold		Swing		

General election 1929: Llanelly
Party	Candidate	Votes	%	±%
Labour	John Williams	28,595	55.4	+2.5
Liberal	Richard Thomas Evans	19,075	36.9	−10.2
Unionist	James Purdon Lewes Thomas	3,969	7.7	N/A
Majority		9,520	18.5	+12.7
Turnout		51,639	79.1	+3.4
Registered electors		65,255		
Labour hold		Swing	+6.3	

=== Elections in the 1930s ===
General election 1931: Llanelly
Party	Candidate	Votes	%	±%
Labour	John Williams	34,196	65.3	+9.9
Conservative	Frank J. Rees	18,163	34.7	+27.0
Majority		16,033	30.6	+12.1
Turnout		52,359	78.1	−1.0
Registered electors		67,047		
Labour hold		Swing		

General election 1935: Llanelly
Party	Candidate	Votes	%	±%
Labour	John Williams	Unopposed		
Registered electors		70,380		
Labour hold				

1936 Llanelli by-election
Party	Candidate	Votes	%	±%
Labour	Jim Griffiths	32,188	66.8	N/A
National Liberal	William Albert Jenkins	15,967	33.3	N/A
Majority		16,221	33.5	N/A
Turnout		48,155	68.4	N/A
Registered electors		70,380		
Labour hold		Swing		

=== Elections in the 1940s ===
General election 1945: Llanelly
Party	Candidate	Votes	%	±%
Labour	Jim Griffiths	44,514	81.1	N/A
Conservative	G O George	10,397	18.9	N/A
Majority		34,117	62.2	N/A
Turnout		54,911	74.9	N/A
Registered electors		73,728		
Labour hold		Swing		

=== Elections in the 1950s ===
General election 1950: Llanelly
Party	Candidate	Votes	%	±%
Labour	Jim Griffiths	39,326	70.8	−10.3
Liberal	Huw Thomas	7,700	13.9	N/A
Conservative	D P Owen	6,362	11.5	−7.4
Plaid Cymru	David Eirwyn Morgan	2,134	3.8	N/A
Majority		31,626	56.9	−5.3
Turnout		55,522	80.9	+6.0
Registered electors		68,655		
Labour hold		Swing		

General election 1951: Llanelly
Party	Candidate	Votes	%	±%
Labour	Jim Griffiths	39,731	72.5	+1.7
Conservative	Henry Gardner	11,315	20.6	+9.1
Plaid Cymru	David Eirwyn Morgan	3,765	6.9	+3.1
Majority		28,416	51.9	−5.0
Turnout		54,811	81.6	+0.7
Registered electors		67,157		
Labour hold		Swing		

General election 1955: Llanelly
Party	Candidate	Votes	%	±%
Labour	Jim Griffiths	34,021	66.6	−5.9
Conservative	Trevor Skeet	10,640	20.8	+0.2
Plaid Cymru	David Eirwyn Morgan	6,398	12.5	+5.6
Majority		23,381	45.8	−6.1
Turnout		51,059	78.7	−2.9
Registered electors		64,858		
Labour hold		Swing		

General election 1959: Llanelly
Party	Candidate	Votes	%	±%
Labour	Jim Griffiths	34,625	66.7	+0.1
Conservative	Henry Gardner	10,128	19.5	−0.7
Plaid Cymru	David Eirwyn Morgan	7,176	13.8	+1.3
Majority		24,497	47.2	−4.6
Turnout		51,929	81.1	+2.4
Registered electors		64,048		
Labour hold		Swing		

=== Elections in the 1960s ===
General election 1964: Llanelly
Party	Candidate	Votes	%	±%
Labour	Jim Griffiths	32,546	65.9	+0.8
Conservative	Philip A. Maybury	6,300	12.8	−6.7
Liberal	Esyr G. Lewis	6,031	12.2	N/A
Plaid Cymru	Pennar Davies	3,469	7.0	−6.8
Communist	Robert E. Hitchon	1,061	2.2	N/A
Majority		26,246	53.1	+5.9
Turnout		49,407	79.4	−1.7
Registered electors		62,235		
Labour hold		Swing		

General election 1966: Llanelly
Party	Candidate	Votes	%	±%
Labour	Jim Griffiths	33,674	71.4	+5.5
Conservative	Jeremy C. Peel	7,143	15.2	+2.4
Plaid Cymru	Pennar Davies	5,132	10.9	+3.9
Communist	Robert E. Hitchon	1,211	2.6	+0.4
Majority		26,531	56.2	+3.1
Turnout		47,160	76.2	−3.2
Registered electors		61,868		
Labour hold		Swing		

=== Elections in the 1970s ===
General election 1970: Llanelli
Party	Candidate	Votes	%	±%
Labour	Denzil Davies	31,398	62.8	−8.6
Plaid Cymru	Carwyn James	8,387	16.8	+5.9
Conservative	Mary A. Jones	5,777	11.6	−3.6
Liberal	Donald Lewis	3,834	7.7	N/A
Communist	Robert E. Hitchon	603	1.2	−1.4
Majority		23,011	46.0	−10.2
Turnout		49,999	77.3	+1.1
Registered electors		64,650		
Labour hold		Swing		

General election February 1974: Llanelli
Party	Candidate	Votes	%	±%
Labour	Denzil Davies	28,941	57.8	−5.0
Conservative	G Richards	7,496	15.0	+3.4
Liberal	E J Evans	7,140	14.3	+6.6
Plaid Cymru	R Williams	6,060	12.0	−4.8
Communist	Robert E. Hitchon	507	1.0	−0.2
Majority		23,011	46.0	±0.0
Turnout		50,144	77.3	±0.0
Registered electors		64,076		
Labour hold		Swing		

General election October 1974: Llanelli
Party	Candidate	Votes	%	±%
Labour	Denzil Davies	29,474	59.4	+2.6
Liberal	Michael Willis Gimblett	7,173	14.5	+0.2
Plaid Cymru	R Williams	6,797	13.7	+1.7
Conservative	G Richards	6,141	12.4	−2.6
Majority		22,301	45.0	−1.0
Turnout		49,585	76.9	−0.4
Registered electors		64,495		
Labour hold		Swing		

General election 1979: Llanelli
Party	Candidate	Votes	%	±%
Labour	Denzil Davies	30,416	59.5	+0.1
Conservative	G D J Richards	10,471	20.5	+8.1
Liberal	Kenneth Rees	5,856	11.5	−3.0
Plaid Cymru	H Roberts	3,793	7.4	−6.3
Communist	Robert E. Hitchon	617	1.2	N/A
Majority		19,945	39.0	−6.0
Turnout		51,153	79.4	+2.5
Registered electors		64,429		
Labour hold		Swing		

=== Elections in the 1980s ===
General election 1983: Llanelli
Party	Candidate	Votes	%	±%
Labour	Denzil Davies	23,207	48.2	−11.3
Conservative	Nicholas Kennedy	9,601	20.0	−0.5
Alliance (Liberal)	Kenneth Rees	9,076	18.9	+7.4
Plaid Cymru	Hywel Teifi Edwards	5,880	12.2	+4.8
Communist	Robert E. Hitchon	371	0.8	−0.4
Majority		13,606	28.3	−10.7
Turnout		48,135	75.4	−4.0
Registered electors		63,826		
Labour hold		Swing		

General election 1987: Llanelli
Party	Candidate	Votes	%	±%
Labour	Denzil Davies	29,506	59.2	+11.0
Conservative	Philip Circus	8,571	17.2	−2.8
Alliance (Liberal)	Martyn Shrewsbury	6,714	13.5	−5.4
Plaid Cymru	Adrian Price	5,088	10.2	−2.0
Majority		20,935	42.0	+13.7
Turnout		49,879	78.1	+2.7
Registered electors		63,845		
Labour hold		Swing		

=== Elections in the 1990s ===
General election 1992: Llanelli
Party	Candidate	Votes	%	±%
Labour	Denzil Davies	27,802	55.0	−4.2
Conservative	Graham L. Down	8,532	16.9	−0.3
Plaid Cymru	Marc Phillips	7,878	15.6	+5.4
Liberal Democrats	Keith L. Evans	6,404	12.7	−0.8
Majority		19,270	38.1	−3.9
Turnout		50,616	77.8	−0.3
Registered electors		65,058		
Labour hold		Swing	−2.0	

General election 1997: Llanelli
Party	Candidate	Votes	%	±%
Labour	Denzil Davies	28,851	57.9	+2.9
Plaid Cymru	Marc Phillips	7,812	19.0	+3.4
Conservative	Andrew Hayes	5,003	12.1	−4.8
Liberal Democrats	Nick Burree	3,788	9.2	−3.5
Socialist Labour	John Willock	757	1.8	N/A
Majority		21,039	38.9	+0.9
Turnout		41,211	70.7	−7.1
Registered electors		58,293		
Labour hold		Swing	−0.1	

=== Elections in the 2000s ===
General election 2001: Llanelli
Party	Candidate	Votes	%	±%
Labour	Denzil Davies	17,586	48.6	−9.3
Plaid Cymru	Dyfan Jones	11,183	30.9	+11.9
Conservative	Simon Hayes	3,442	9.5	−2.6
Liberal Democrats	Ken Rees	3,065	8.5	−0.7
Green	Jan Cliff	515	1.4	N/A
Socialist Labour	John Willock	407	1.1	−0.7
Majority		6,403	17.7	−21.2
Turnout		36,198	62.3	−8.4
Registered electors		58,148		
Labour hold		Swing	-10.6	

General election 2005: Llanelli
Party	Candidate	Votes	%	±%
Labour	Nia Griffith	16,592	46.9	−1.7
Plaid Cymru	Neil Baker	9,358	26.5	−4.4
Conservative	Adrian Phillips	4,844	13.7	+4.2
Liberal Democrats	Ken Rees	4,550	12.9	+4.4
Majority		7,234	20.4	+2.7
Turnout		35,344	63.5	+1.2
Registered electors		55,280		
Labour hold		Swing	+1.4	

=== Elections in the 2010s ===
General election 2010: Llanelli
Party	Candidate	Votes	%	±%
Labour	Nia Griffith	15,916	42.5	−4.4
Plaid Cymru	Myfanwy Davies	11,215	29.9	+3.4
Conservative	Christopher Salmon	5,381	14.4	+0.7
Liberal Democrats	Myrddin Edwards	3,902	10.4	−2.5
UKIP	Andrew Marshall	1,047	2.8	N/A
Majority		4,701	12.6	−7.8
Turnout		37,461	67.3	+3.8
Registered electors		55,637		
Labour hold		Swing	−4.0	

General election 2015: Llanelli
Party	Candidate	Votes	%	±%
Labour	Nia Griffith	15,948	41.3	−1.2
Plaid Cymru	Vaughan Williams	8,853	23.0	−6.9
UKIP	Kenneth Rees	6,269	16.3	+13.5
Conservative	Selaine Saxby	5,534	14.3	−0.1
Liberal Democrats	Cen Phillips	751	1.9	−8.5
Green	Guy Smith	689	1.8	N/A
People First	Siân Caiach	407	1.1	N/A
TUSC	Scott Jones	123	0.3	N/A
Majority		7,095	18.3	+5.7
Turnout		38,574	64.5	−2.8
Registered electors		59,314		
Labour hold		Swing	+2.9	

General election 2017: Llanelli
Party	Candidate	Votes	%	±%
Labour	Nia Griffith	21,568	53.5	+12.2
Conservative	Stephen Davies	9,544	23.7	+9.4
Plaid Cymru	Mari Arthur	7,351	18.2	−4.8
UKIP	Kenneth Rees	1,331	3.3	−13.0
Liberal Democrats	Rory Daniels	548	1.4	−0.5
Majority		12,024	29.8	+11.5
Turnout		40,342	67.0	+2.5
Registered electors		60,185		
Labour hold		Swing	+1.4	

General election 2019: Llanelli
Party	Candidate	Votes	%	±%
Labour	Nia Griffith	16,125	42.2	−11.3
Conservative	Tamara Reay	11,455	30.0	+6.3
Plaid Cymru	Mari Arthur	7,048	18.4	+0.2
Brexit Party	Susan Boucher	3,605	9.4	N/A
Rejected ballots		152		
Majority		4,670	12.2	−17.6
Turnout		38,233	63.2	−3.8
Registered electors		60,513		
Labour hold		Swing	-8.8	

Of the 152 rejected ballots:

- 135 were either unmarked or it was uncertain who the vote was for.
- 17 voted for more than one candidate.

2019 notional result (Note: Estimate of the 2019 general election result as if the revised boundaries recommended under the 2023 boundary review were in place)
Party	Vote	%
Labour	17,256	39.3
Conservative	13,463	30.7
Plaid Cymru	9,280	21.1
Brexit Party	3,893	8.9
Majority	3,793	8.6
Turnout	43,892	62.8
Electorate	69,895	

=== Elections in the 2020s ===
General election 2024: Llanelli
Party	Candidate	Votes	%	±%
Labour	Nia Griffith	12,751	31.3	−8.0
Reform	Gareth Beer	11,247	27.6	+18.7
Plaid Cymru	Rhodri Davies	9,511	23.3	+2.2
Conservative	Charlie Evans	4,275	10.5	−20.2
Liberal Democrats	Chris Passmore	1,254	3.1	N/A
Green	Karen Laurence	1,106	2.7	N/A
UKIP	Stan Robinson	600	1.5	N/A
Majority		1,504	3.7	−7.5
Turnout		40,744	57.0	−5.8
Registered electors		71,536		
Labour hold		Swing	−13.4	

== See also ==
- Llanelli (Senedd constituency)
- List of parliamentary constituencies in Dyfed
- List of parliamentary constituencies in Wales
