= David Eirwyn Morgan =

Welsh minister and journalist

David Eirwyn Morgan (Welsh: [ˈe(i)ruːɪn] /ˈaɪrwɪn/ IRE-win; 23 April 1918 – 30 August 1982) was a minister, journalist and Welsh nationalist politician.

Born in Pen-y-groes in Carmarthenshire, Morgan began preaching at an early age in the Baptist chapel in nearby Saron, in the parish of Llandybie. He studied at the Amman Valley Grammar School in Ammanford, where he befriended David Rees Griffiths (also known by his bardic name of Amanwy), the school caretaker, who introduced him to Welsh literature.

Morgan won a scholarship to the University College of Swansea and graduated with a degree in Welsh, then studied theology at the Presbyterian College, Carmarthen, and finally the Baptist College in London. He was subsequently ordained and attached to a parish in Pisgah. During this time, he became active in Plaid Cymru, and stood unsuccessfully for the party in Llanelli at the 1950, 1951, 1955 and 1959 general elections. He also edited the party newspaper, Y Ddraig Goch.

In 1956, he moved to minister in Llandudno, then in 1960 he won a Fulbright Scholarship to the New York Union Seminary. However, he left early due to ill health, and returned to Llandudno. In 1967, he became a tutor in theology at the University College Bangor, and from 1971 until 1980, he served as principal of its Baptist College.

Morgan was also an active pacifist, and served as secretary of the Welsh Peace Society. He was the first secretary of the Welsh Hymn Society. He was also active in journalism; from 1960 to 1972, he was the editor of Seren Cymru, the newspaper of the Welsh Baptists, and from 1975 until 1977, he edited Seren Gomer.
