= 1979 Llanelli Borough Council election =

Welsh local election

An election to Llanelli Borough Council was held in May 1979. It was preceded by the 1976 election and followed by the 1983 election. On the same day there was a UK general election and were elections to the other district local authorities and community councils in Wales. The leader of the council was again Michael Willis Gimblett, who had held the role from the previous election.

== Results ==
=== Llanelli Borough Ward One (three seats) ===
Ward One 1979
Party	Candidate	Votes	%	±%
Liberal	Michael Willis Gimblett*	2,515		
Liberal	Elinor Gem Lloyd*	2,053		
Independent	Harry J. Richards*	1,972		
Labour	E. Davies	1,662		
Labour	R. Thorpe	1,439		
Labour	J. Smith	1,388		
Plaid Cymru	G. Morris	1,106		
Liberal hold		Swing		
Liberal hold		Swing		
Independent hold		Swing		

=== Llanelli Borough Ward Two (three seats) ===
Ward Two 1979
Party	Candidate	Votes	%	±%
Labour	W.M. Jones*	2,121		
Labour	R.T. Peregrine*	1,991		
Labour	D.H.R. Jones*	1,974		
Conservative	W. Bates	1,141		
Plaid Cymru	P. Davies	751		
Plaid Cymru	W. Phillips	656		
Plaid Cymru	Dyfrig Thomas	599		
Labour hold		Swing		
Labour hold		Swing		
Labour hold		Swing		

=== Llanelli Borough Ward Three (three seats) ===
Ward Three 1979
Party	Candidate	Votes	%	±%
Labour	T.G. Thomas*	2,581		
Labour	D.H. Williams*	2,267		
Labour	T. Evans*	2,257		
Liberal	I.C. Rosser	1,062		
Liberal	J. Phillips	959		
Liberal	S.I. Chrinowsky	807		
Labour hold		Swing		
Labour hold		Swing		
Labour hold		Swing		

=== Llanelli Borough Ward Four (three seats) ===
Ward Four 1979
Party	Candidate	Votes	%	±%
Labour	G. Rees*	2,153		
Labour	David Tudor James	1,882		
Independent Labour	I. Roberts*	1,515		
Labour	R. Palmer	1,439		
Labour hold		Swing		
Labour hold		Swing		
Independent Labour hold		Swing		

=== Llanelli Borough Ward Five (three seats) ===
Ward Five 1979
Party	Candidate	Votes	%	±%
Labour	Gwilym Glanmor Jones*	2,631		
Labour	H.W. Jenkins	2,069		
Labour	F. Owens	2,040		
Ratepayers	P. Morris	1,440		
Independent	V. Bevan	598		
Labour hold		Swing		
Labour hold		Swing		
Labour gain from Independent		Swing		

=== Llanelli Borough Ward Six (three seats) ===
Ward Six 1979
Party	Candidate	Votes	%	±%
Labour	R.J. James*	2,190		
Independent	D. George*	1,968		
Independent	G. Thomas*	1,549		
Labour	E. Richards	1,194		
Independent	G. West	1,182		
Plaid Cymru	M. Clement	714		
Labour hold		Swing		
Independent hold		Swing		
Independent hold		Swing		

=== Llanelli Borough Ward Seven (three seats) ===
Ward Seven 1979
Party	Candidate	Votes	%	±%
Labour	G.J. Jones	2,627		
Labour	Sefton Ronald Coslett	2,439		
Labour	R.H.V. Lewis*	2,392		
Plaid Cymru	T.E. Sennell	1,735		
SWP	John Willock	736		
Labour gain from Plaid Cymru		Swing		
Labour hold		Swing		
Labour hold		Swing		

=== Llanelli Borough Ward Eight (three seats) ===
Bowen had been elected as a Labour candidate in 1973 and 1976.

Ward Eight 1979
Party	Candidate	Votes	%	±%
Labour	Henry John Evans*	2,953		
Labour	L.R. McDonagh*	2,897		
Independent	A. Bowen*	2,541		
Labour	L. Murphy	2,218		
Conservative	T. Howells	1,813		
Communist	R.E. Hitchon	844		
Labour hold		Swing		
Labour hold		Swing		
Independent gain from Labour		Swing		

=== Llanelli Borough Ward Nine (three seats) ===
Ward Nine 1979
Party	Candidate	Votes	%	±%
Labour	A.F. Brown	1,871		
Labour	W.R. Thomas*	1,852		
Labour	E. Thomas*	1,547		
Liberal	Kenneth Denver Rees	1,007		
Plaid Cymru	T. Davies	553		
Plaid Cymru	B. Marke	441		
Labour hold		Swing		
Labour hold		Swing		
Labour hold		Swing		

=== Llanelli Borough Ward Ten (three seats) ===
Ward Ten 1979
Party	Candidate	Votes	%	±%
Labour	D. Lewis*	2,750		
Labour	E. Thomas*	2,712		
Labour	D. White	2,517		
Conservative	H. Williams	1,787		
Plaid Cymru	B. Lane	1,510		
Labour hold		Swing		
Labour hold		Swing		
Labour hold		Swing		

=== Llanelli Borough Ward Eleven (three seats) ===
Ward Eleven 1979
Party	Candidate	Votes	%	±%
Labour	S. Davies*	2,645		
Labour	E.T. Morgan*	2,538		
Labour	Alban William Rees	2,456		
Ratepayers	T. Morris*	2,384		
Independent Labour	Philip Brinley Davies	1,965		
Labour hold		Swing		
Labour hold		Swing		
Labour gain from Ratepayers		Swing		
