= Abel Thomas =

British politician (1848–1912)

Abel Thomas c1895

Abel Thomas, c1905

Abel Thomas (1848 – 23 July 1912) was a Welsh Liberal politician and lawyer.

== Family ==
Thomas was the son of a Baptist Minister, the Reverend Theophilus Evan Thomas JP of Trehale in Pembrokeshire. In 1875, he married Bessie Polak. They had a son and two daughters before his wife died in 1890.

== Education and law career ==
Thomas was educated at Clifton College and the University of London where he gained his BA degree. He went into the law and was called to the Bar at the Middle Temple in 1873. He took silk in 1891 and became a Bencher of the Middle Temple in 1900. He was later elected Chairman of the Pembrokeshire Quarter Sessions. He also served for many years as a Justice of the Peace in Pembrokeshire.

== Election to the House of Commons ==
In 1890 a vacancy arose in the East Carmarthenshire constituency following the death of David Pugh, the octogenarian member since 1885. A large number of candidates were proposed, including Alfred Davies, R.D. Burnie, and the well-known local doctor, Howell Rees. However, within a few days all had withdrawn with the exception of Thomas and Gwilym Evans, vice-chairman of Carmarthenshire County Council. It appeared that Evans was largely supported by the more industrialised parts of the community while Thomas drew most support from the rural areas.

A series of meetings addressed by both Thomas and Evans were held throughout the constituency. It became clear from these meetings that there were differences between the candidates. Evans addressed the first meeting at Llandovery predominantly using the Welsh language, which invited a contrast with his opponent's limited knowledge of Welsh. As a result, Thomas felt compelled at a subsequent meeting at Llandeilo to appeal that his lack of fluency in Welsh should not be held to support his opponent. Evans placed himself firmly in the radical camp, supporting Home Rule. emphasising his prominent role as a member of Carmarthenshire County Council, and stating that he would follow in the footsteps of Mabon, David Randell and Tom Ellis. Thomas, in contrast expressed himself to be an opponent of Home Rule for Wales. On 29 July, some three hundred delegates from throughout the constituency gathered at Ammanford to select a candidate. The proceedings were dominated by debates about the eligibility of various delegates to vote but eventually it was agreed to proceed on the basis of the credentials provided for those delegates in attendance. Abel Thomas was selected as Liberal candidate, defeating Gwilym Evans by 170 votes against 121.

== Maiden Speech ==
Upon his election, the Cambrian News predicted that Thomas would not be a silent member of the Commons. He made his maiden speech on 1 December 1890 on issues relating to the position of the established church in Wales.

== Vote of Confidence and the 1892 Election ==
Within two years of his election there were criticisms of Thomas within the constituency, leading to a vote of no confidence by the Llandeilo Liberal Association in May 1892. At the annual meeting of the Liberal Association at Ammanford some weeks later, Thomas defended his record, insisting that he must remain free to take on legal work from whoever engaged him, as this allowed him to serve in Parliament. Specifically, the Llandeilo Liberals had raised the issue of his representing licensed victualers. He also insisted that he had not instanced to criticise nonconformist ministers in a speech some months earlier. This satisfied his critics, who included the Rev. Towyn Jones and a vote of confidence was passed.

At the General Election some weeks later, Thomas was unexpectedly opposed by a Liberal Unionist candidate, the Swansea businessman Captain Thomas Davies. It was argued that Davies would gain support from Calvinistic Methodists, who opposed Thomas's links to the liquor trade. Davies focused his campaign almost totally upon Irish Home Rule. Thames was re-elected with a large majority.

== The 1895 and 1900 General Elections ==
Thomas continued to represent the constituency while being largely inactive in Parliament. Few people, complained a Welshman editorial, could have concerned themselves less with the business of the constituency than Mr. Abel Thomas has done during the time he has been in Parliament.

At the 1895 General Election, Thomas was opposed by E.E. Richardson of Glanbrydan Park. Richardson polled better than Davies three years earlier but Thomas still won a comfortable victory. He faced the same opponent at the 1900 General Election, once again with a similar result.

== Later political career ==
He held the seat with comfortable majorities at each succeeding election, except in the 1906 general election when he was returned unopposed. At the by-election caused by Thomas' death on 22 August 1912, the Rev. Josiah Towyn Jones held the seat for the Liberals albeit with a reduced majority. Thomas apparently made little impact in Parliament. While the historian K O Morgan described him as one of the relatively young, Welsh born, nonconformist Liberal candidates who were responsible for changing the character of the Welsh parliamentary party in the 1880s and 1890s from the one dominated by traditional, Gladstonian, Anglican members.

In 1907 the miners of the constituency nominated David Morgan, secretary of the Anthracite District of the SWMF as Thomas's successor. By the time he died in 1912, Thomas was regarded as 'elderly and silent' member.

== Death ==
Thomas died suddenly of heart failure on 23 July 1912 in his hotel at Swansea where he had gone for the Glamorgan Assizes.

== References and other sources ==
- Who was Who, OUP 2007
- Obituary – The Times, 24 July 1913

== Sources ==
=== Books and Journals ===
- Rees, Ivor Thomas (2004). "The Seafaring Preacher; a note on Captain Thomas Davies, JP (1825–1905)". Journal of Welsh Religious History. New Series. 4: 102–7.

== See also ==
- List of United Kingdom by-elections (1900-1918)

Parliament of the United Kingdom
Preceded by David Pugh	Member of Parliament for East Carmarthenshire; 1890 – 1912	Succeeded by Josiah Towyn Jones
