= Death of Mabel Greenwood =

1919 accused murder by a solicitor in Wales

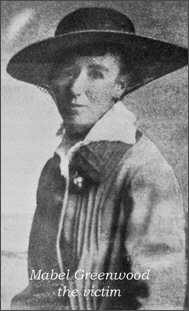
Mabel Greenwood

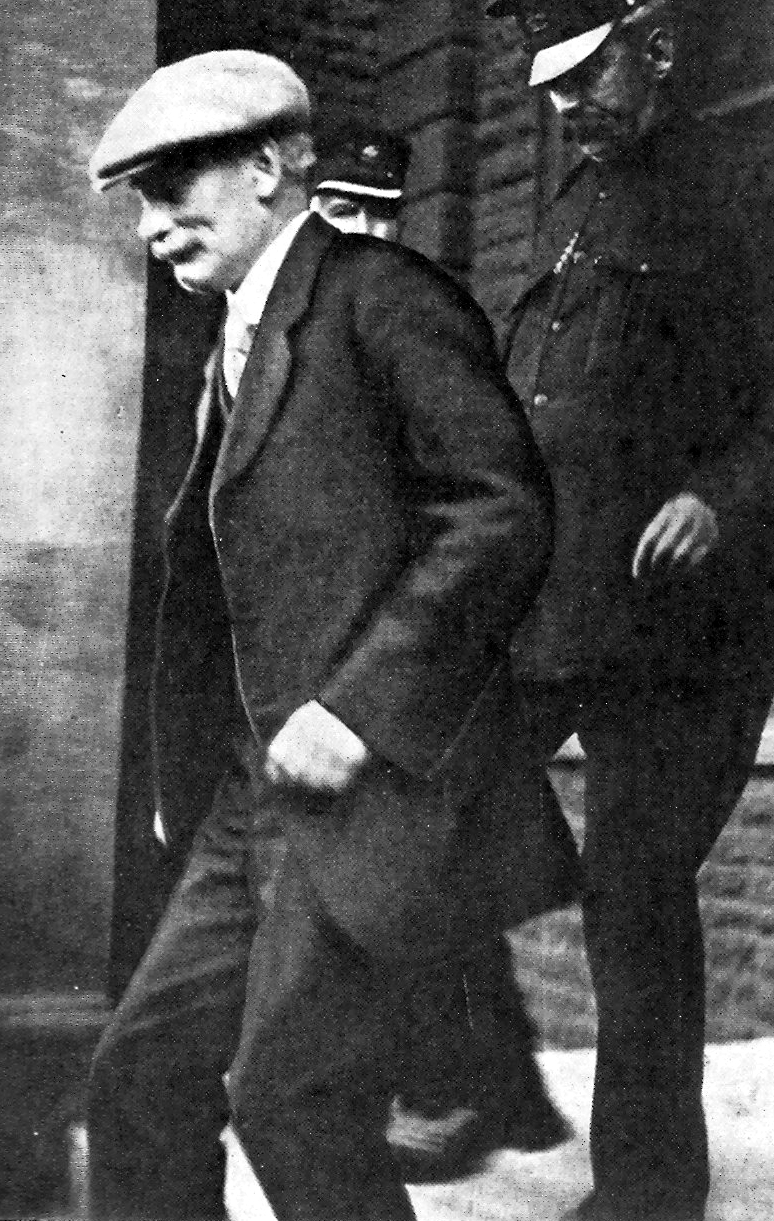
Harold Greenwood being brought to court for his trial

On 17 June 1919, Mabel Greenwood (née Bowater) died in the company of her husband Harold Greenwood (1874 – 17 January 1929) an English solicitor. Greenwood was accused and acquitted of murdering his wife by arsenic poisoning. He was tried at Carmarthen Assizes in 1920 and defended by Edward Marshall Hall; his case is a rare example of a legal professional being charged with murder.

== Facts ==
Harold Greenwood, a Yorkshire solicitor, moved to Wales in 1898 where he, his wife Mabel (née Bowater) and their four children lived comfortably with domestic staff, in Kidwelly, Carmarthenshire. Mabel was not in good health and on 16 June 1919, complained of stomach pains after eating a gooseberry pie for lunch; "it always disagrees with me", she said. Greenwood gave her brandy, which caused her to vomit, and Dr Griffiths was summoned and dispensed medication. By the early hours of the 17th, however, she had died and the cause of death was certified by Griffiths as heart disease. Within a few months of her funeral, Greenwood married Gwladys Jones, who was much younger than Mabel, causing much local gossip. Mabel had been an active and popular member of the local community and in October 1919 the gossip had reached such a level that the police proposed to exhume the body for forensic examination; when Greenwood was informed of this, he replied "Just the very thing – I am quite agreeable".

Mabel Greenwood's remains were examined and found to contain 0.25 to 0.5 grains (16 to 32 mg) of arsenic, but no evidence of heart disease. Accordingly, an inquest was held at Kidwelly Town Hall in June 1920 at which the jury returned a unanimous verdict of "murder by arsenical poisoning ... administered by Harold Greenwood". The jury had been told that Greenwood had purchased weedkiller containing arsenic. Greenwood's comment on hearing the verdict was "Oh dear!", and he was arrested on 17 June 1920.

== Trial ==
Greenwood's trial began on 2 November 1920 at Carmarthen assizes before Mr Justice Shearman; he was prosecuted by Sir Edward Marlay Samson and defended by Sir Edward Marshall Hall. The case was Hall's third murder trial of the year, and he was already in poor health; however, he decided to accept the brief, despite doubts expressed by others, claiming "The man's innocent, and I'll get him off – you'll see".

Hall's defence of Greenwood hinged upon impugning the forensic evidence and that of a parlourmaid. In the former case, he showed that Dr Griffiths had himself given Mabel Greenwood medication (bismuth and morphine) at the time, which could be a cause of death independently of any arsenic, despite Griffiths' change of story from morphine to opium, then a much weaker drug; Hall seized upon this difference to maximum effect. In the case of Hannah Williams, the maid, Hall successfully showed that her evidence had been strongly influenced by a police officer who had interviewed her sometime after the death, and that she had changed her story on several occasions.

Hall opened his defence by quoting from Othello and alleging the whole case arose from local gossip. He called Greenwood as a witness in his own defence, who denied any involvement in his wife's death, and withstood lengthy cross-examination. His final witness was Irene Greenwood, the accused's 22-year-old daughter, who stated that she had also drunk, without ill effect, from the wine bottle alleged by the prosecution to have been the source of the poison that killed Mabel. The judge referred to this in his summing-up: "If she also drank from the bottle, there is an end of the case". Greenwood was acquitted and the jury added a rider (not published at the time) to their verdict, stating "We are satisfied ... that a dangerous dose of arsenic was administered to Mabel Greenwood ... but we are not satisfied that this was the immediate cause of death ... (nor) how or by whom the arsenic was administered".

Greenwood, with his second wife, moved to Sellack, near Ross-on-Wye, Herefordshire, changed his name to Pilkington, and lived an uneventful life until his death in 1929.

== See also ==
- Herbert Rowse Armstrong
- Sally Clark

== Sources ==
- Wilson, Colin (1984). Encyclopedia of Murder. Pan Books. ISBN 0-330-28300-6.
- Duke, Winifred (1930). Trial of Harold Greenwood. Notable British Trials. William Hodge & Co.
- Marjoribanks, Edward (1929). The Life of Sir Edward Marshall Hall. Victor Gollancz. ISBN 0-85594-709-8.
