= 1976 Llanelli Borough Council election =

Welsh local election

An election to Llanelli Borough Council was held in May 1976. It was preceded by the 1973 election and followed by the 1979 election. On the same day there were elections to the other district local authorities and community councils in Wales.

== Results ==
=== Llanelli Borough Ward One (three seats) ===
Ward One 1976
Party	Candidate	Votes	%	±%
Liberal	Michael Willis Gimblett	1,603		
Independent	Harry J. Richards*	1,520		
Liberal	Elinor Gem Lloyd	1,382		
Labour	R. Palmer*	1,280		
Labour	D. Thomas*	1,113		
Labour	N. Price	889		
Liberal gain from Labour		Swing		
Independent hold		Swing		
Liberal gain from Labour		Swing		

Michael Willis Gimblett, served as mayor and leader of the Llanelli borough council during 1976. As the liberal candidate for the Llanelli parliamentary seat in 1974, he is known to be the only liberal candidate during that general election to increase the liberal percentage of the vote, whilst all other liberal vote percentages across all other constituencies in the country decreased.

=== Llanelli Borough Ward Two (three seats) ===
Ward Two 1976
Party	Candidate	Votes	%	±%
Labour	W.M. Jones*	1,198		
Labour	R.T. Peregrine*	1,057		
Labour	D.H.R. Jones*	1,057		
Liberal	W. Williams	746		
Liberal	C. Rosser	704		
Liberal	W. Bates	576		
Plaid Cymru	P. Davies	489		
Plaid Cymru	Dyfrig Thomas	439		
Plaid Cymru	W. Davies	415		
Labour hold		Swing		
Labour hold		Swing		
Labour hold		Swing		

=== Llanelli Borough Ward Three (three seats) ===
Ward Three 1976
Party	Candidate	Votes	%	±%
Labour	T.G. Thomas*	1,364		
Labour	D.H. Williams	1,020		
Labour	T. Evans*	1,012		
Independent Labour	John Gladwyn Hill	976		
Liberal	D. Phillips	687		
Liberal	E. Clarke	629		
Labour hold		Swing		
Labour hold		Swing		
Labour hold		Swing		

=== Llanelli Borough Ward Four (three seats) ===
Ward Four 1976
Party	Candidate	Votes	%	±%
Labour	W. Griffiths*	936		
Independent Labour	I. Roberts*	849		
Labour	G. Rees	789		
Labour	L. Hickman	788		
Liberal	R. Bates	624		
Liberal	H. Owens	554		
Labour hold		Swing		
Independent Labour hold		Swing		
Labour hold		Swing		

=== Llanelli Borough Ward Five (three seats) ===
Ward Five 1976
Party	Candidate	Votes	%	±%
Labour	Gwilym Glanmor Jones*	1,506		
Independent	H. Howells	1,220		
Labour	H. Hughes*	1,114		
Labour	F. Owens*	1,098		
Independent	D. Morgan	638		
Labour hold		Swing		
Independent gain from Labour		Swing		
Labour hold		Swing		

=== Llanelli Borough Ward Six (three seats) ===
Ward Six 1976
Party	Candidate	Votes	%	±%
Labour	R.J. James*	1,286		
Independent	D. George	1,128		
Independent	G. Thomas*	1,005		
Labour	A. Phillips	859		
Plaid Cymru	M. Clement	424		
Labour	S. Howell	393		
Plaid Cymru	R. Williams	353		
Plaid Cymru	E. Morgan	322		
Labour hold		Swing		
Independent gain from Labour		Swing		
Independent hold		Swing		

=== Llanelli Borough Ward Seven (three seats) ===
Ward Seven 1976
Party	Candidate	Votes	%	±%
Labour	L. Davies*	1,577		
Labour	R.H.V. Lewis*	1,408		
Plaid Cymru	E. Bowen	1,349		
Labour	G.J. Jones*	1,336		
Plaid Cymru	F. Davies	1,266		
Labour hold		Swing		
Labour hold		Swing		
Plaid Cymru gain from Labour		Swing		

=== Llanelli Borough Ward Eight (three seats) ===
Ward Eight 1976
Party	Candidate	Votes	%	±%
Labour	A. Bowen*	1,409		
Labour	L.R. McDonagh*	1,392		
Labour	Henry John Evans*	1,280		
Liberal	J. Thomas	987		
Plaid Cymru	W. Hopkin	840		
Liberal	V. Evans	773		
Liberal	J. Jones	758		
Communist	R.E. Hitchon	381		
Labour hold		Swing		
Labour hold		Swing		
Labour hold		Swing		

=== Llanelli Borough Ward Nine (three seats) ===
Ward Nine 1983
Party	Candidate	Votes	%	±%
Labour	W.R. Thomas	1,295		
Labour	W. Jenkins	1,168		
Labour	E. Thomas*	1,075		
Liberal	I. Buckley	568		
Labour hold		Swing		
Labour hold		Swing		
Labour hold		Swing		

=== Llanelli Borough Ward Ten (three seats) ===
Ward Ten 1976
Party	Candidate	Votes	%	±%
Labour	E. Thomas*	1,962		
Labour	D. Lewis*	1,734		
Labour	D. Thomas*	1,683		
Plaid Cymru	H. Davies	875		
Liberal	O. Jones	852		
Plaid Cymru	B. Lane	761		
Liberal	L. Edington	627		
Labour hold		Swing		
Labour hold		Swing		
Labour hold		Swing		

=== Llanelli Borough Ward Eleven (three seats) ===
Ward Eleven 1976
Party	Candidate	Votes	%	±%
Labour	S. Davies*	2,230		
Ratepayers	T. Morris	2,193		
Labour	E.T. Morgan	2,135		
Labour	C. McLoughlin*	1,644		
Labour hold		Swing		
Ratepayers hold		Swing		
Labour hold		Swing		
