= 1983 Llanelli Borough Council election =

Welsh local election

An election to Llanelli Borough Council was held in May 1983. It was preceded by the 1979 election and followed by the 1987 election. On the same day there were elections to the other district local authorities and community councils in Wales.

== Results ==
=== Llanelli Borough Ward One (three seats) ===
Ward One 1983
Party	Candidate	Votes	%	±%
Alliance	Michael Willis Gimblett*	1,552		
Chamber of Trade	W.H. Griffiths	1,246		
Alliance	Elinor Gem Lloyd*	1,128		
Conservative	C.S. Snee	694		
Labour	B.E. Jones	596		
Labour	A.C. Hemment	556		
Labour	A.U. Lewis	530		
Alliance	S.N. Hockeridge	526		
Alliance hold		Swing		
Chamber of Trade hold		Swing		
Alliance hold		Swing		

=== Llanelli Borough Ward Two (three seats) ===
Ward Two 1983
Party	Candidate	Votes	%	±%
Labour	R.T. Peregrine*	1,006		
Labour	W.M. Jones*	975		
Labour	D.H.R. Jones*	877		
Chamber of Trade	F. St J. Roberts	628		
Chamber of Trade	L.A. Jones	561		
Alliance	R.C. Rosser	434		
Alliance	M. Soady	334		
Alliance	M.N. Burree	328		
Labour hold		Swing		
Labour hold		Swing		
Labour hold		Swing		

=== Llanelli Borough Ward Three (three seats) ===
Ward Three 1983
Party	Candidate	Votes	%	±%
Labour	T.G. Thomas*	1,352		
Labour	D.H. Williams*	1,228		
Labour	Keri Peter Thomas	1,108		
Alliance	I.C. Rosser	598		
Labour hold		Swing		
Labour hold		Swing		
Labour hold		Swing		

=== Llanelli Borough Ward Four (three seats) ===
Ward Four 1983
Party	Candidate	Votes	%	±%
Labour	David Tudor James*	Unopposed		
Labour	R. Palmer*	Unopposed		
Labour	G. Rees*	Unopposed		
Labour hold		Swing		
Labour hold		Swing		
Labour hold		Swing		

=== Llanelli Borough Ward Five (three seats) ===
Ward Five 1983
Party	Candidate	Votes	%	±%
Labour	Gwilym Glanmor Jones*	1,942		
Labour	F. Owens*	1,378		
Labour	H.W. Jenkins*	1,337		
Independent	D.D. Richards	1,243		
Alliance	V. Bevan	397		
Labour hold		Swing		
Labour hold		Swing		
Labour hold		Swing		

=== Llanelli Borough Ward Six (three seats) ===
Ward Six 1983
Party	Candidate	Votes	%	±%
Labour	R.J. James*	1,280		
Labour	Vincent John Rees	1,156		
Labour	A.H.P. Phillips	860		
Independent	George W. West	820		
Independent	G. Thomas*	771		
Independent	Raymond L. Hall	547		
Tenants/Ratepayers	D.H. Morris	434		
Labour hold		Swing		
Labour hold		Swing		
Labour gain from Independent		Swing		

=== Llanelli Borough Ward Seven (three seats) ===
Ward Seven 1983
Party	Candidate	Votes	%	±%
Labour	R.H.V. Lewis*	1,572		
Labour	G.J. Jones*	1,521		
Labour	Sefton Ronald Coslett*	1,500		
Plaid Cymru	T.E. Sennell	1,055		
Labour hold		Swing		
Labour hold		Swing		
Labour hold		Swing		

=== Llanelli Borough Ward Eight (three seats) ===
Ward Eight 1983
Party	Candidate	Votes	%	±%
Labour	Henry John Evans*	1,319		
Labour	L.R. McDonagh*	1,319		
Labour	A. Bowen*	1,292		
Communist	R.E. Hitchon	418		
Labour hold		Swing		
Labour hold		Swing		
Labour hold		Swing		

=== Llanelli Borough Ward Nine (three seats) ===
Ward Nine 1983
Party	Candidate	Votes	%	±%
Labour	A.F. Brown*	1,002		
Labour	W.R. Thomas*	997		
Labour	D.T. Davies	945		
Independent Labour	J.E. Evans	573		
Alliance	Kenneth Denver Rees	395		
Labour hold		Swing		
Labour hold		Swing		
Labour hold		Swing		

=== Llanelli Borough Ward Ten (three seats) ===
The election delayed due to death of candidate and was held some weeks later.

Ward Ten 1983
Party	Candidate	Votes	%	±%
Labour	W.R. Jones	853		
Labour	G.H. Jones	842		
Labour	M. Evans	794		
Independent	L. Jones	592		
Independent	F. Roberts	566		
Independent	K. Evans	549		
Independent Labour	Dynfor Vaughan Owens	536		
Independent	D. Thomas	523		
Labour hold		Swing		
Labour hold		Swing		
Labour hold		Swing		

=== Llanelli Borough Ward Eleven (three seats) ===
Ward Eleven 1983
Party	Candidate	Votes	%	±%
Labour	E.T. Morgan*	2,015		
Labour	Alban William Rees*	2,006		
Labour	George Malcolm Davies	1,604		
Independent	Philip Brinley Davies	1,504		
Labour hold		Swing		
Labour hold		Swing		
Labour hold		Swing		
