= Jim Griffiths =

British Labour politician (1890-1975)

The Right Honourable Jim Griffiths CH
- Griffiths in 1964

Secretary of State for Wales
- In office 16 October 1964 – 5 April 1966
- Prime Minister: Harold Wilson
- Preceded by: Office Created
- Succeeded by: Cledwyn Hughes

Deputy Leader of the Labour Party Deputy Leader of the Opposition
- In office 2 February 1956 – 24 October 1959
- Leader: Hugh Gaitskell
- Preceded by: Herbert Morrison
- Succeeded by: Aneurin Bevan

Secretary of State for the Colonies
- In office 28 February 1950 – 26 October 1951
- Prime Minister: Clement Attlee
- Preceded by: Arthur Creech Jones
- Succeeded by: Oliver Lyttelton

Minister of National Insurance
- In office 27 July 1945 – 28 February 1950
- Prime Minister: Clement Attlee
- Preceded by: Leslie Hore-Belisha
- Succeeded by: Edith Summerskill

Member of Parliament for Llanelli
- In office 26 March 1936 – 29 May 1970
- Preceded by: John Henry Williams
- Succeeded by: Denzil Davies

Personal details
- Born: 19 September 1890 Betws, Carmarthenshire, Wales
- Died: 7 August 1975 (aged 84) Teddington, London, England
- Party: Labour
- Spouse: Winifred Rutley

James (Jeremiah) Griffiths (19 September 1890 – 7 August 1975) was a Welsh Labour Party politician who served for 34 years as a Member of Parliament (MP). He was a trade union leader and became the first Secretary of State for Wales, serving from 1964 to 1966 under Harold Wilson.

== Background and education ==
He was born in the predominantly Welsh-speaking village of Betws, near Ammanford in Carmarthenshire. The youngest of ten children, his father, William Griffiths, was the local blacksmith. He spoke no English until he was five. Educated at Betws Board School, he left at the age of 13 to work at Ammanford No. 1 colliery (Gwaith Isa'r Betws), where he eventually became Lodge Secretary. Griffiths was a pacifist and while campaigning against the Great War met fellow socialist Winifred Rutley, and they married in October 1918. His brother (David Rees Griffiths, 1882–1953) was a Welsh poet who took the bardic name of 'Amanwy' after his native valley.

== Political career ==
Griffiths continued his education by attending night school and became an active socialist. He helped establish a branch of the Independent Labour Party in Ammanford in 1908 and soon became its secretary. Later, he occupied the powerful post of secretary of the newly formed Ammanford Trades Council (1916–1919). At the age of 29, he left the colliery on a miner's scholarship (1919–1921) to the Central Labour College, London, where at the same time Aneurin Bevan and Morgan Phillips were studying.

On returning home, Griffiths worked as Llanelli Labour Party agent (1922–1925), before becoming an agent for the Anthracite Miners' Association (1925–1936), and President of the powerful South Wales Miners' Federation – known locally as the Fed – in the Anthracite district of West Wales (1934–1936). In 1936, he was elected Labour Member of Parliament (MP) for what was then safe seat of Llanelli. Three years later, he continued his rise through the Labour movement by getting elected to the party's National Executive Committee. In 1942, he led 97 Labour MP's to vote against the Labour Party's compromise with Winston Churchill's Conservative Party for the government to neither endorse nor condemn the Beveridge Report recommending the establishment of a comprehensive welfare state in postwar Britain. Despite the defiance of the party leadership, the vote boosted Labour's popularity by demonstrating its support for the report's recommendations.

Following Labour's victory at the 1945 general election, he was made a Privy Counsellor and Minister for National Insurance by Prime Minister Clement Attlee. In this role, he was responsible for creating the modern state benefit system. He introduced the Family Allowances Act 1945, the National Insurance Act 1946 and the National Assistance and Industrial Injuries Act 1948. Along with Bevan, he was one of the chief architects of the British welfare state. He served as Chairman of the Labour Party (1948–1949), and in 1950 he became Secretary of State for the Colonies. Within two years, though, the Labour Party was out of office.

During the long period in opposition, Griffiths became Deputy Leader of the Labour Party (1955–1959), and spokesman on Welsh affairs. He used his good relationship with Hugh Gaitskell to commit the Labour Party to a measure of devolution. Amid the Suez Crisis of 1956, he made an important speech opposing the underhanded tactics of the then Prime Minister Anthony Eden in which he stated: "This is for our country a black and tragic week... an unjustifiable and wicked war". This was said to sum up the mood of many at the time.

Given Griffiths' determination in having campaigned for a Secretary of State for Wales ever since the 1930s, Harold Wilson persuaded him to delay retirement and serve as the first Secretary of State for Wales following Labour's 1964 general election victory. At Wilson's instigation, Griffiths established the Welsh Office and laid the foundations for the role until the 1966 general election, whereupon he returned to the backbenches. He was appointed a Member of the Order of the Companions of Honour.

Though by now suffering from ill-health, Griffiths avoided resigning from the House of Commons, because he feared that if he did so, Labour would lose a by-election in Llanelli. Plaid Cymru had captured the neighbouring seat of Carmarthen in 1966; and the Llanelli Rugby coach Carwyn James was poised to stand for Plaid Cymru in a by-election, had Griffiths stood down. He remained in Parliament until the 1970 general election, by which time he was about to turn 80 and was among Parliament's oldest MPs, and among the few born in the 19th century. He was succeeded in Llanelli by Denzil Davies, who fended off the Plaid Cymru challenge. Similarly to Griffiths, Davies would remain MP for the constituency for around 35 years. The previous year, Griffiths had published his autobiography, Pages From Memory (London: Dent, 1969).

== Personal life ==
He died in Teddington, Greater London, aged 84, leaving two sons and two daughters. He is buried at the Christian Temple chapel in Ammanford. In a memorial address, Jim Callaghan, prime minister (1976–79), described him as "one of the greatest sons of Wales. We honour the memory of Jim Griffiths of Ammanford. I mention his birth place because, despite all his honours and journeyings, it was the place of his birth, deep in the heart of Wales, that essentially shaped his life and actions."

== Bibliography ==
- Plan for Britain: A Collection of Essays prepared for the Fabian Society by G D H Cole, Aneurin Bevan, Jim Griffiths, L F Easterbrook, Sir William Beveridge, and Harold J Laski (Not illustrated with 127 text pages).
- Griffiths, James. Pages from Memory. London: J. M. Dent & Sons, 1969.
- Griffiths, Winifred. One Woman's Story (privately printed, 1979)

Parliament of the United Kingdom
Preceded by John Henry Williams	Member of Parliament for Llanelli; 1936–1970	Succeeded by Denzil Davies
Political offices
Preceded by Leslie Hore-Belisha	Minister of National Insurance; 1945–1950	Succeeded by Edith Summerskill
Preceded by Arthur Creech Jones	Secretary of State for the Colonies; 1950–1951	Succeeded by Oliver Lyttelton
New ministerial post	Secretary of State for Wales; 1964–1966	Succeeded by Cledwyn Hughes
Party political offices
Preceded by Manny Shinwell	Chair of the Labour Party; 1948–1949	Succeeded by Sam Watson
Preceded by Herbert Morrison	Deputy Leader of the Labour Party; 1955–1959	Succeeded by Aneurin Bevan
Trade union offices
Preceded by John Thomas	Agent for the Anthracite District of the South Wales Miners' Federation; 1925–1934	Succeeded by Arthur Horner; John James; D. J. Williams
Preceded by Enoch Morrell	President of the South Wales Miners Federation; 1934–1936	Succeeded by Arthur Horner
