= Winifred Griffiths =

British and Welsh politician

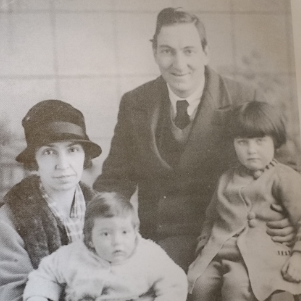
- Winifred and part of her family
- Born: Winifred Ritley; 21 May 1895; Overton
- Died: 10 September 1982 (aged 87); Teddington
- Political party: Labour
- Spouse: Jim Griffiths
- Children: four

Winifred Griffiths born Winifred Ritley (21 May 1895 – 10 September 1982) was a British and Welsh politician. She published her autobiography "One Woman's Story" in 1979. She wrote about the life of a clever girl who went into domestic service. Inspired by socialism she became an activist. Her husband became a minister but "she was clearly proud of her own" achievements.

== Life ==
Griffiths was born in Overton in Hampshire and she did exceptionally well at school leading the whole school in her results when she was fourteen. Her mother Rose (née Treacher) and her father William George Rutley had four children and her father was a paper mill worker and Methodist lay-preacher. Her earned thirty shillings a week so lack of funds, and as she later found out good advice, led to her leaving school. She tried to become a teacher by correspondence but she could not afford the text books. Her work was not intellectual, she worked at a gabardine factory and then in tailoring. She worked happily for four years in domestic service, but a chance view of a magazine changed her life. The article was by an economist and she became politically aware.

She took an interest in socialism and she was advised to contact a Welsh politician named Jim Griffiths. She corresponded and she went to visit him in 1916 and by the end of the trip they had privately agreed to marry. The engagement lasted two years during which she left a good job to move closer to him. They married in October 1918 and they went to live in a friend's house in Ammanford. By the 1922 election she was addressing crowds in Llanelli on her socialist ideas.

Their fourth and last child was born in 1931 but they employed domestic help and this enabled Jim to further his political life and Winifred also followed her interests. She led the women's section of the local Labour Party, she was a magistrate, a district councillor and she served on the board of guardians.

Jim became an MP in 1936. During the war she volunteered to do social work organised by the Women's Voluntary Service. In 1945 Jim became Minister for National Insurance in the newly elected Labour government.

Griffiths started to publish her life story in 1974 and she completed her autobiography, "One Woman's Story", in 1979. Her biographer, Carol Jenkins, notes that she was proud of the "important part she played in her ... her husband's achievements, [but] she was clearly proud of her own."

She died in hospital in Teddington, having outlived her husband.

== Private life ==
She and Jim had four children, the last, Arthur, was born in 1931.
