= 1890 East Carmarthenshire by-election =

UK Parliamentary by-election in Wales

The 1890 East Carmarthenshire by-election was a parliamentary by-election held for the House of Commons constituency of East Carmarthenshire in West Wales in August 1890.

== Vacancy ==
The vacancy resulted from the death of the sitting member, David Pugh, who had held the seat since it was formed in 1885.

== Selection of Liberal candidate ==
David Pugh had announced his intention not to seek re-election some weeks before his death. Therefore moves to select a new candidate were already in place when the vacancy occurred. In July, delegates from the various branches of the Liberal Party on the division met at Llandeilo and it was decided that a series of meetings would be held throughout the constituency to allow the electors to hear the candidates. A large number of candidates were proposed, including Alfred Davies, R. D. Burnie, and the well-known local doctor, Howell Rees.

A number of meetings were subsequently held which gave the candidates an opportunity to address the electors. Within a few days all had withdrawn with the exception of Gwilym Evans and the Swansea-based lawyer, Abel Thomas. It appeared that Evans was largely supported by the more industrialised parts of the community while Thomas drew most support from the rural areas.

At these meetings, both candidates expressed support for the mainstream Liberal policies of the day. However, it also became clear from these meetings that there were differences between the candidates. Evans addressed the first meeting at Llandovery predominantly using the Welsh language, which invited a contrast with his opponent's limited knowledge of Welsh. As a result, Thomas felt compelled at a subsequent meeting at Llandeilo to appeal that his lack of fluency in Welsh should not be held to support his opponent. Evans placed himself firmly in the radical camp, supporting home rule. emphasizing his prominent role as a member of Carmarthenshire County Council, and stating that he would follow in the footsteps of Mabon, David Randell and Tom Ellis. Thomas, in contrast expressed himself to be an opponent of home rule for Wales.

It may well have been that popular momentum would have been behind Gwilym Evans, not least because of his well-known reputation as producer of his famous 'Quinine Bitters'. However, a number of questions were raised about his candidature. It was stated that he owned half a dozen public houses in the constituency. There were claims that he had publicly supported a Conservative candidate, John Jones, at the general election of 1880. Evans countered by giving his own full version of the episode and stating that Jones had assisted him in gaining a public office. However, more recently it was stated that Evans had opposed the Association in 1886 and taken up a position akin to a Liberal Unionist over Irish home rule.

On 29 July, some three hundred delegates from throughout the constituency gathered at Ammanford to select a candidate. The proceedings were dominated by debates about the eligibility of various delegates to vote but eventually it was agreed to proceed on the basis of the credentials provided for those delegates in attendance. Abel Thomas was selected as Liberal candidate, defeating Gwilym Evans by 170 votes against 121. It was felt that Evans's flirtation with Liberal Unionism may have proved his undoing. As the Cambrian News stated, "Wales is determined to have nothing whatever to do with any candidate who in 1886 went over to the Tories."

== The conservatives ==
The Conservatives had run Sir Marteine Lloyd of Bronwydd against Pugh at the 1885 general election but chose not to contest the seat in 1886. After a meeting held at Llandeilo it was resolved not to contest the by-election. In many ways, as the Carmarthen Journal editorial admitted, this was an indication that the Conservatives considered a fight to be hopeless, especially as no preparations had been made.

== The result ==
Abel Thomas was therefore declared elected unopposed, being formally nominated at Llandeilo by J. W. Gwynne Hughes of Tregib and the Rev. William Davies.

1890 East Carmarthenshire by-election
Party	Candidate	Votes	%	±%
Liberal	Abel Thomas	Unopposed		
Registered electors				
Liberal hold				

== See also ==
- List of United Kingdom by-elections
- United Kingdom by-election records
