= Seren Cymru =

Welsh newspaper

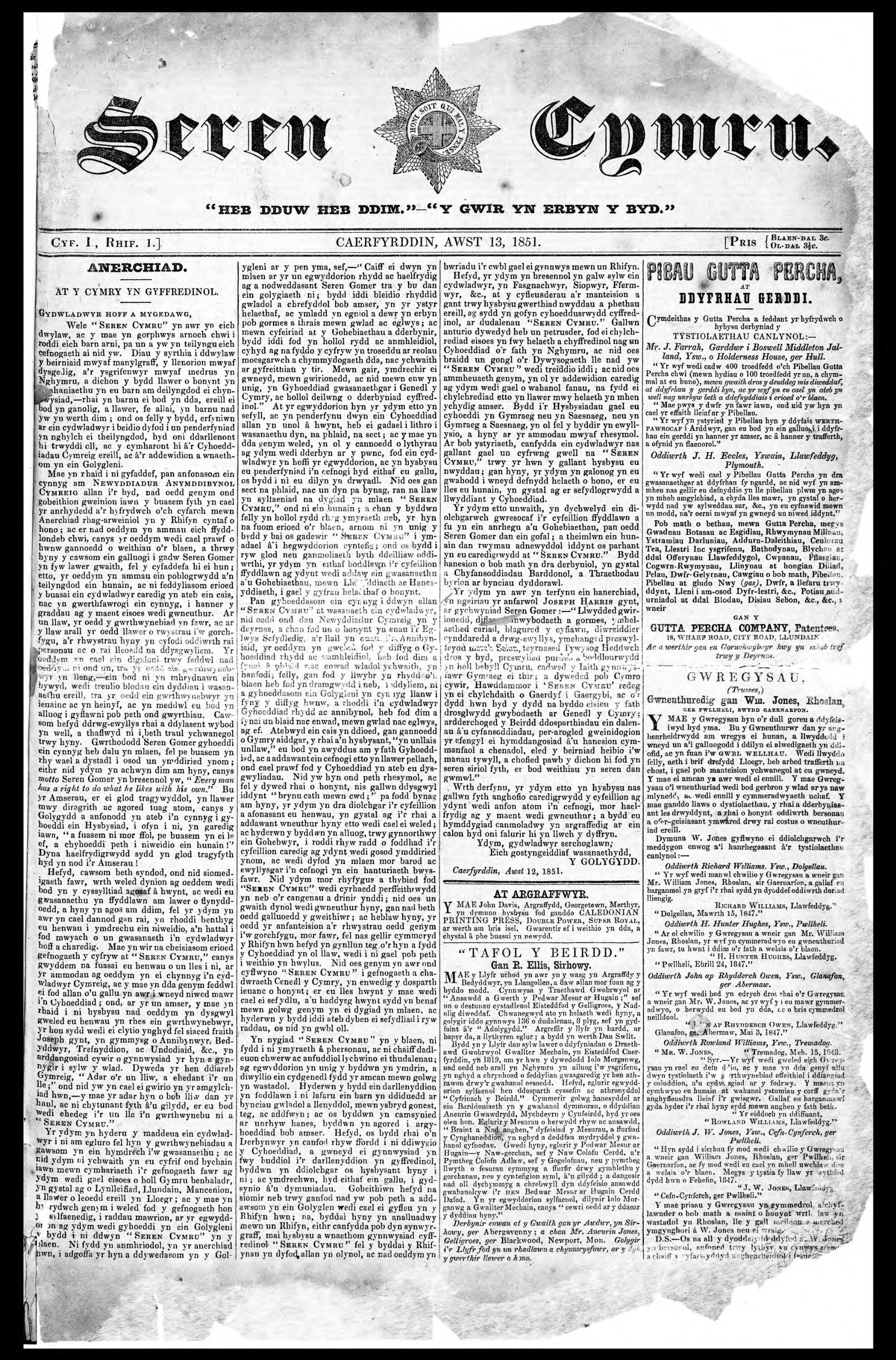
- Type: weekly newspaper
- Owner: William Morgan Evans (1880)
- Founder: Samuel Evans
- Publisher: William Morgan Evans
- Editor: John Emlyn Jones[*], Benjamin Thomas[*], John Jenkins, David Eirwyn Morgan, Samuel Evans[*]
- Launched: 13 August 1851
- City: Carmarthen, Swansea
- OCLC number: 895985218

Seren Cymru was a Welsh language newspaper. It was first published in Carmarthen in 1851 by Samuel Evans, but failed. It was more successful when it was re-established in 1856, with J. Emlyn Jones as editor. It contained local, national, and international news, and contributions from people with radical ideas. The paper was owned by the printer William Morgan Evans until 1880, after which he sold it to a Baptist company.

== Editors ==
1960–1972: David Eirwyn Morgan
