= Kidwelly =

Town and community in Carmarthenshire, Wales

Kidwelly: Welsh: Cydweli
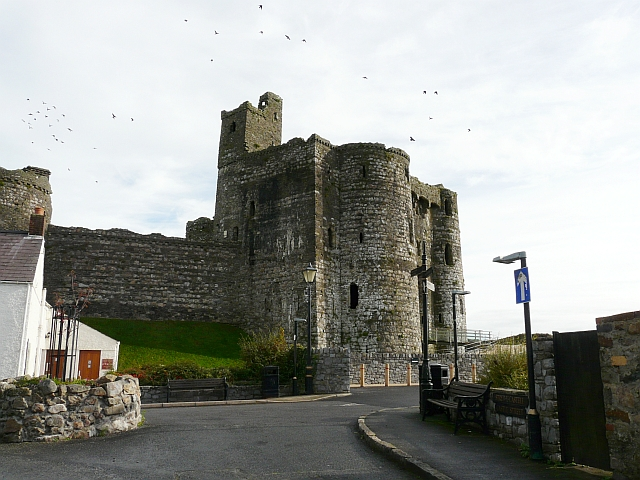
- Gatehouse at Kidwelly Castle

- Location within Carmarthenshire
- Population: 3,689 (Community, 2021)
- OS grid reference: SN407067
- Community: Kidwelly
- Principal area: Carmarthenshire
- Preserved county: Dyfed
- Country: Wales
- Sovereign state: United Kingdom
- Post town: KIDWELLY
- Postcode district: SA17
- Dialling code: 01554
- Police: Dyfed-Powys
- Fire: Mid and West Wales
- Ambulance: Welsh
- UK Parliament: Llanelli
- Senedd Cymru – Welsh Parliament: Sir Gaerfyrddin
- Website: kidwelly.gov.uk
- List of places UK Wales Carmarthenshire 51.736°N 4.307°W Map of the community

Kidwelly (Welsh: Cydweli) is a town and community in Carmarthenshire, southwest Wales, approximately 7 miles (11 km) northwest of the most populous town in the county, Llanelli. At the 2021 census the community had a population of 3,689.

It lies on the River Gwendraeth above Carmarthen Bay. The community includes Mynyddgarreg and Llangadog.

== History ==
Kidwelly either means "the land of Cadwal" or comes from the combination of the two words Cyd (joint) and Gweli (bed), referring to the town's position adjoining the confluence of the rivers Gwendraeth Fawr and Gwendraeth Fach. It is also sometimes linked to the name, 'Catguoloph' recorded by the monk, Nennius, writing in the 9th century.

Another local legend is that Cunedda invaded the area in the 5th century but was killed and buried at a hill now called Allt Cunedda, north of Kidwelly.

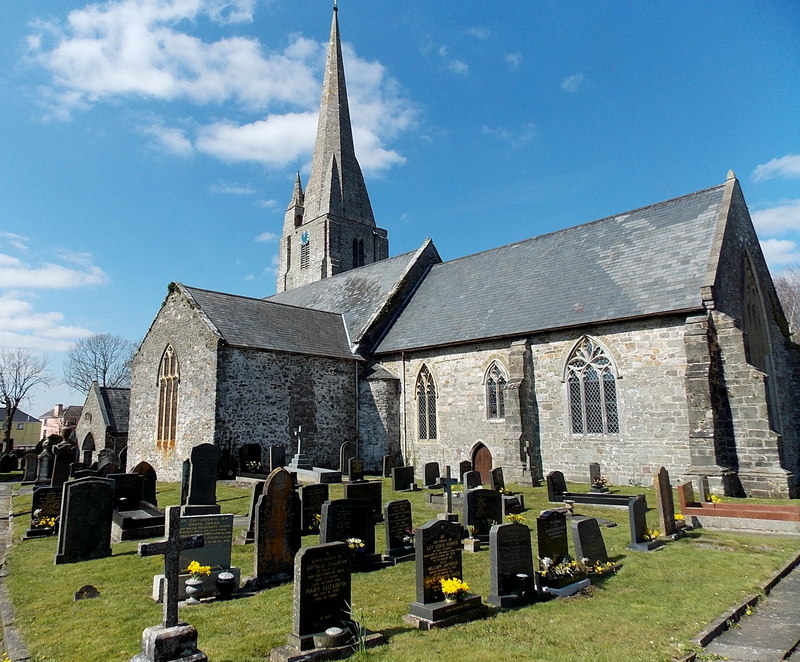
St Mary's Church

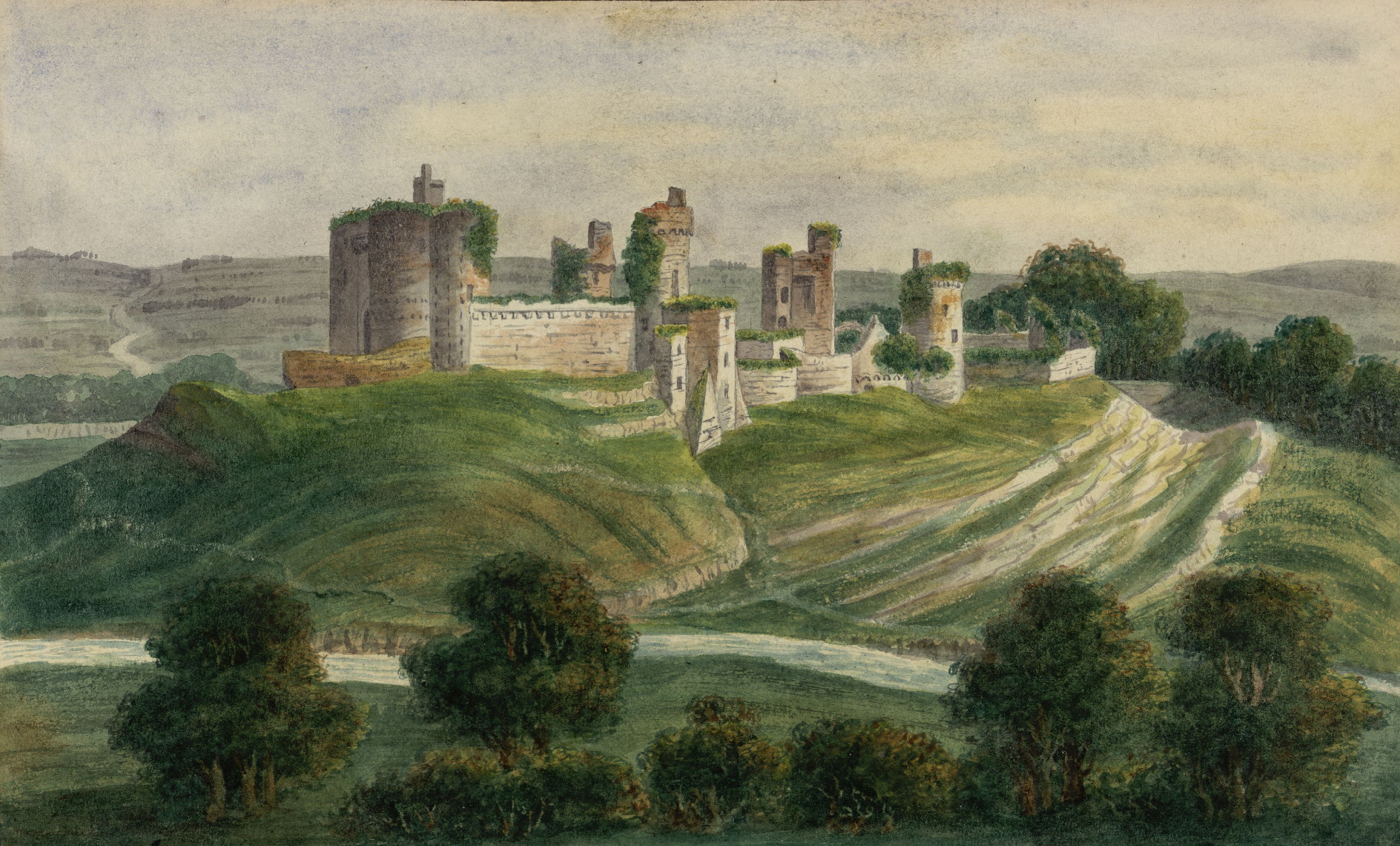
Kidwelly c.1830

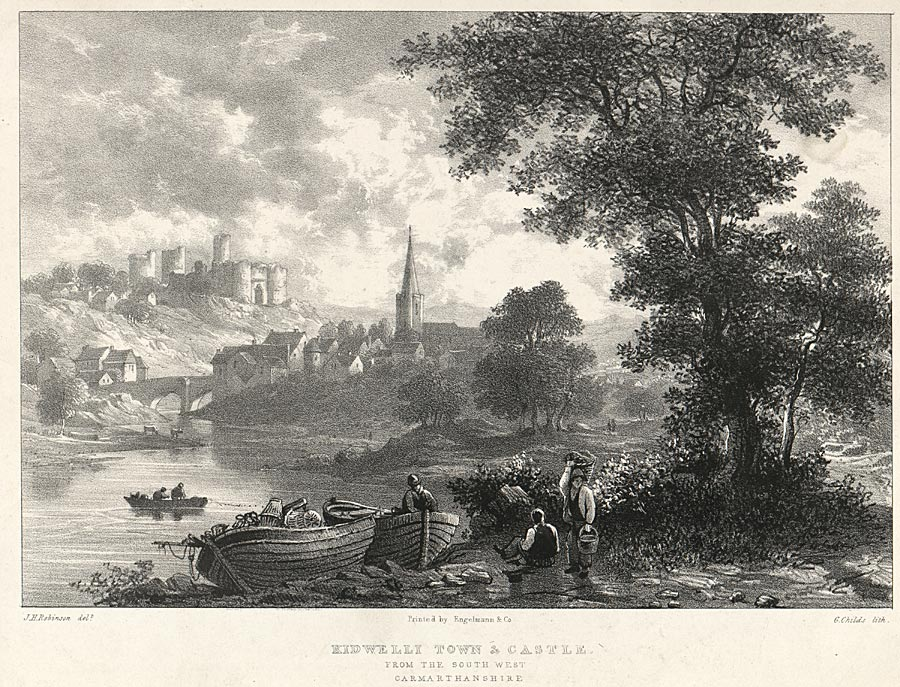
Town and castle, 1831

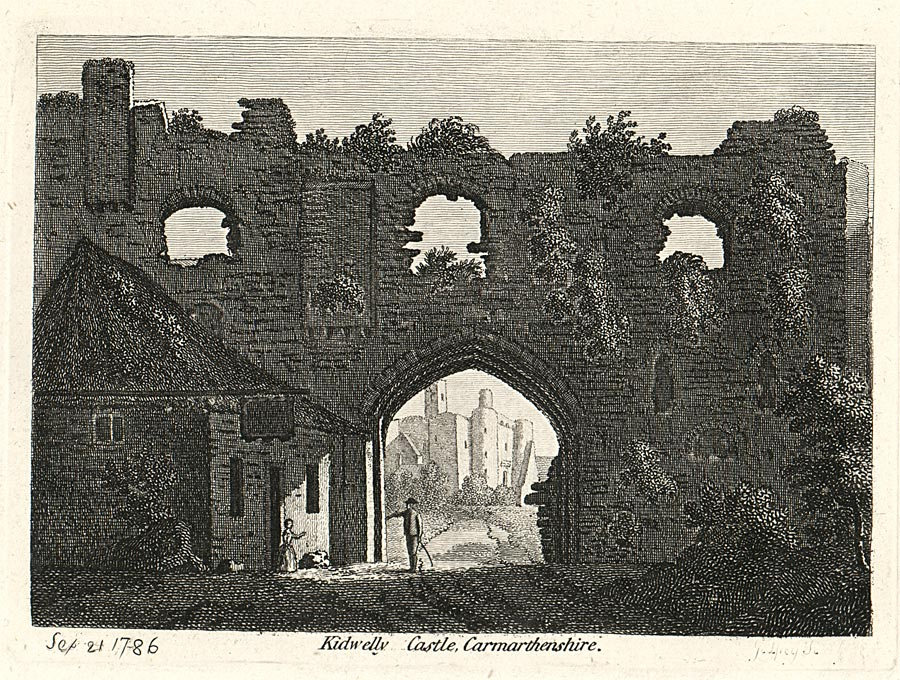
Town wall, 1786

The substantial and well preserved Kidwelly Castle on the north bank of the Gwendraeth Fach river and St Mary's Church on the south side of the river were both established by the invading Normans in the early 12th century. The earliest castle on the site was a motte and bailey structure of earth and timber. During the 13th century the castle was rebuilt in stone, as part of the 'ring of steel' strategy of Edward I for strengthening his control of Wales. The stone castle was built according to the latest strategic military thinking. It had a concentric design with one circuit of defensive walls set within another to allow the castle to be held even if the outer wall should fall. The great gatehouse was begun late in the 14th century but it was not completed until 1422. The castle was besieged in 1403 by forces loyal to Owain Glyndŵr as part of his rebellion aiming to reclaim Welsh independence.

A field in the neighbouring forest of Kingswood, Maes Gwenllian, is known as the location of a battle in 1136, in which Gwenllian ferch Gruffydd, sister of Owain Gwynedd and wife of Gruffydd ap Rhys, led her husband's troops into battle against a Norman army during his absence. She is believed to have been killed either during the battle or shortly afterwards.

During the Industrial Revolution, the town became an important centre of the tinplate industry. A tinplate works was established to the north of the town in 1737, which is believed to have been only the second such works in Britain. The works closed in 1941 but some of the buildings and machinery survive; they were formerly preserved as part of the Kidwelly Industrial Museum, which closed in 2017.

In 1919 Mabel Greenwood, who lived at Kidwelly with her husband, the solicitor Harold Greenwood, was murdered by arsenic poisoning. Harold Greenwood was charged with the murder and tried at Carmarthen assizes in 1920. He was acquitted by the jury, which nevertheless upheld its view that she had been deliberately poisoned. Following the murder and trial, Harold Greenwood remarried and moved away from the area.

== Governance ==
There are two tiers of local government covering Kidwelly, at community (town) and county level: Kidwelly Town Council (Cyngor Tref Cydweli) and Carmarthenshire County Council (Cyngor Sir Gâr). The town council's offices adjoin the Princess Gwenllian Community Centre on Hillfield Villas.

It is within the UK Parliament constituency of Llanelli, represented by the Welsh Labour MP Nia Griffith, and within the Sir Gaerfyrddin Senedd constituency, represented by six members. The community is bordered by the communities of: Llandyfaelog; Llangyndeyrn; Trimsaran; Pembrey and Burry Port Town; and St Ishmael, all in Carmarthenshire.

=== Administrative history ===
Kidwelly was an ancient parish. The town was an ancient borough, being granted its first charter in the early 12th century. A government survey of boroughs in 1835 found that the borough corporation had very few powers. The borough was therefore left unreformed when the Municipal Corporations Act 1835 reformed most ancient boroughs across the country into municipal boroughs.

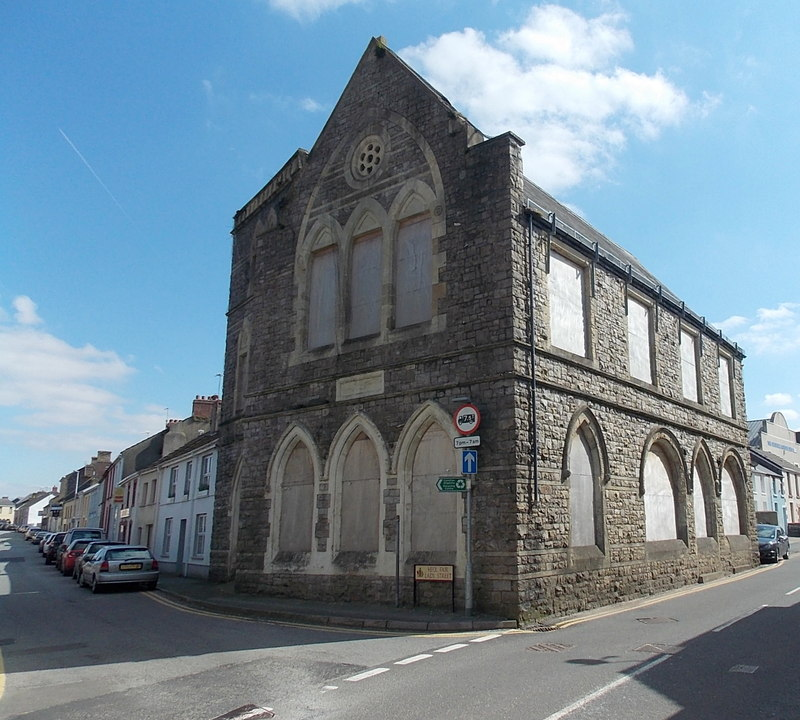
Kidwelly Town Hall

The old borough corporation therefore continued to run the town, but was ineligible to take on additional local government functions. The corporation built itself Kidwelly Town Hall in 1877 at the junction of Causeway Street and Lady Street, to serve both as its headquarters and a covered market. The town was eventually made a municipal borough in 1885. The borough covered most, but not all, of the parish. In 1895, the parish was reduced to match the borough, with the parts of the old parish outside the borough boundary being transferred to the neighbouring parishes of Llandyfaelog, Llangyndeyrn, Pembrey and St Ishmael.

The borough of Kidwelly was abolished in 1974 under the Local Government Act 1972. A community called Kidwelly was created covering the area of the former borough, with its community council taking the name Kidwelly Town Council. District-level functions passed to the new Llanelli Borough Council. Carmarthenshire County Council was abolished as part of the same reforms, with county-level functions passing to the new Dyfed County Council. The borough of Llanelli and county of Dyfed were both abolished in 1996 and their councils' functions passed to a re-established Carmarthenshire County Council. After the 1974 reforms, the Town Hall served as the town's library until 2002, but has been disused since then.

== Tourism ==
Local landmarks include Kidwelly Castle, founded in 1106; a fourteenth-century bridge and gate; the former quay (now a nature reserve); and St Mary's Church.

Kidwelly Carnival is an annual event held on the second Saturday of July. Previous carnivals have featured aerial displays.

The town is twinned with the French village Saint-Jacut-de-la-Mer on the north coast of Brittany.

== Transport ==
Road – Kidwelly is connected to Llanelli and Carmarthen by the A484 road.

Bus/Coach – there are local buses running through Kidwelly operated by First Cymru, linking the town with Llanelli and Carmarthen, with a main stop in the town centre. Some services were withdrawn in 2014. There is a Coach Park located in the town centre.

Rail – Kidwelly railway station is on the West Wales Line. Westbound services from Kidwelly terminate at Carmarthen or Pembroke Dock, with less frequent direct services to Fishguard Harbour and Milford Haven. Eastbound services terminate at Swansea or Cardiff Central, with less frequent direct services to Manchester Piccadilly and London Paddington.

Cycling – Kidwelly is connected to the National Cycle Network along the coast from the east and west by NCR 4. The cycle path runs directly through the town centre.

Air – Pembrey Airport is approximately 3 miles (4.8 km) east of Kidwelly. The nearest airport with domestic and international scheduled flights is Cardiff Airport.

Walking – There are numerous public footpaths and bridleways in Kidwelly and Mynydd-y-Garreg, including Glan yr Afon, just behind the Wesleyan Chapel on the Bridge and Summer Way (Maes yr Haf) off Water Street.

== Current Developments ==
The Kidwelly town council has recently been successful in developing the town’s numerous parks and playgrounds to encourage community participation and provide residents with safe and enjoyable public spaces, the project has seen over £250,000 invested so far.

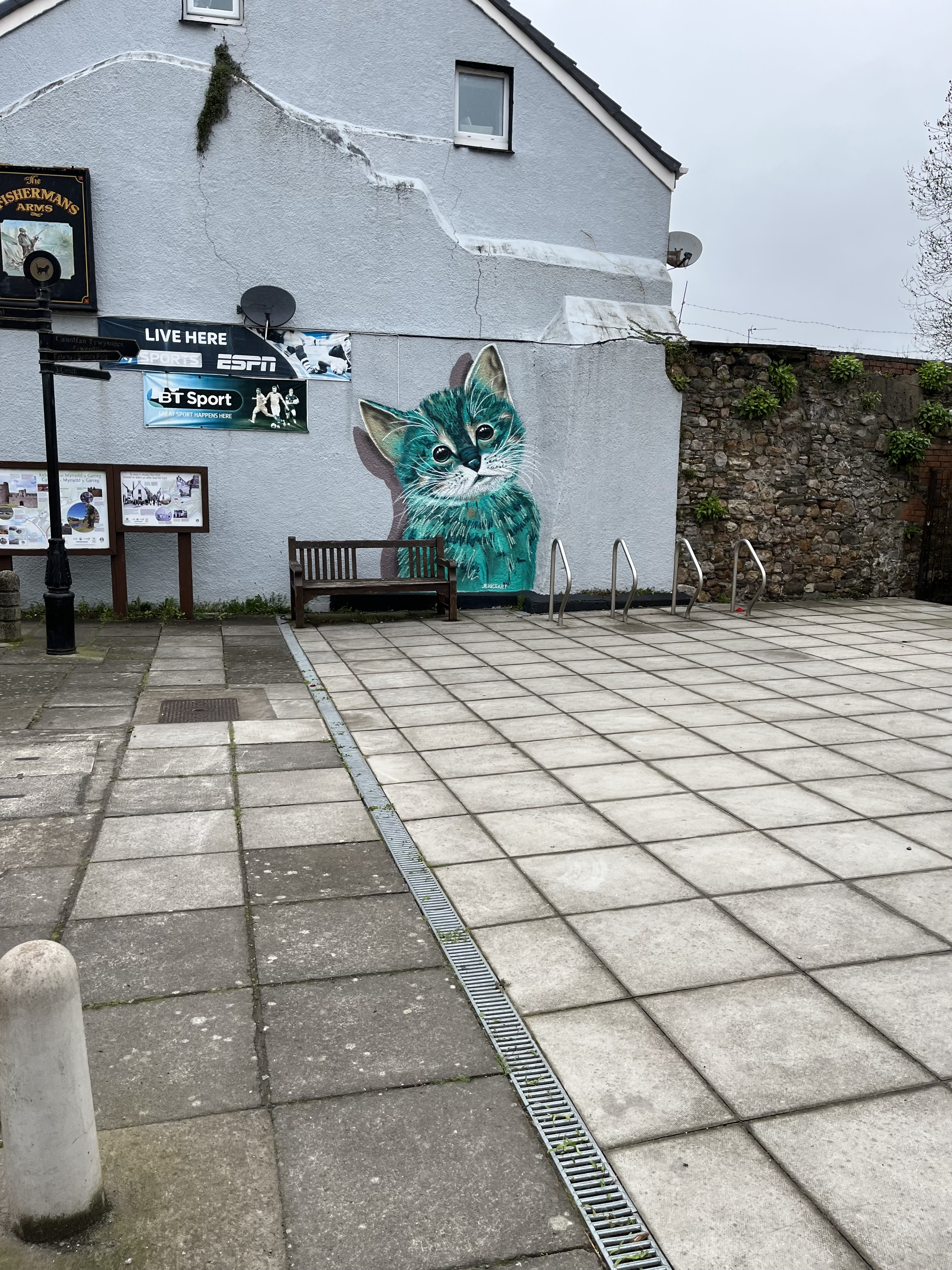
A part of the old Cydweli town square.

Additionally, the town council has begun a redevelopment project to transform the town square into a greener and more convenient space. The project includes open green spaces, new toilet blocks and a more convenient street layout. The work was started in January, 2024 with the aim of completing the project by the end of May, 2024.

== Climate ==
Climate data for Pembrey Sands Air Weapons Range (1991–2020 normals)
Month	Jan	Feb	Mar	Apr	May	Jun	Jul	Aug	Sep	Oct	Nov	Dec	Year
Mean daily maximum °C (°F)	8.3 (46.9)	8.5 (47.3)	10.3 (50.5)	12.9 (55.2)	15.9 (60.6)	18.1 (64.6)	19.8 (67.6)	19.7 (67.5)	18.0 (64.4)	14.8 (58.6)	11.4 (52.5)	9.0 (48.2)	13.9 (57.0)
Mean daily minimum °C (°F)	2.7 (36.9)	2.6 (36.7)	3.6 (38.5)	5.2 (41.4)	7.8 (46.0)	10.6 (51.1)	12.7 (54.9)	12.6 (54.7)	10.6 (51.1)	8.2 (46.8)	5.2 (41.4)	3.2 (37.8)	7.1 (44.8)
Average rainfall mm (inches)	113.5 (4.47)	81.9 (3.22)	71.2 (2.80)	67.9 (2.67)	68.8 (2.71)	73.3 (2.89)	73.9 (2.91)	95.4 (3.76)	78.4 (3.09)	123.4 (4.86)	129.4 (5.09)	125.4 (4.94)	1,102.5 (43.41)
Average rainy days (≥ 1 mm)	16.1	13.1	12.6	11.3	10.5	10.6	10.9	12.0	11.4	15.6	16.9	16.2	157.3
Source: Met Office

== Notable people ==
- William Jones (1676–1725), Principal of Jesus College, Oxford, from 1720 to 1725
- Thomas Pardo (died 1763), Principal of Jesus College, Oxford, from 1727 to 1763.
- Gordon Lewis (born 1936), Welsh rugby footballer with 400+ club appearances
- Ray Gravell (1951–2007), Welsh rugby union centre with 23 caps for Wales

== Sport ==
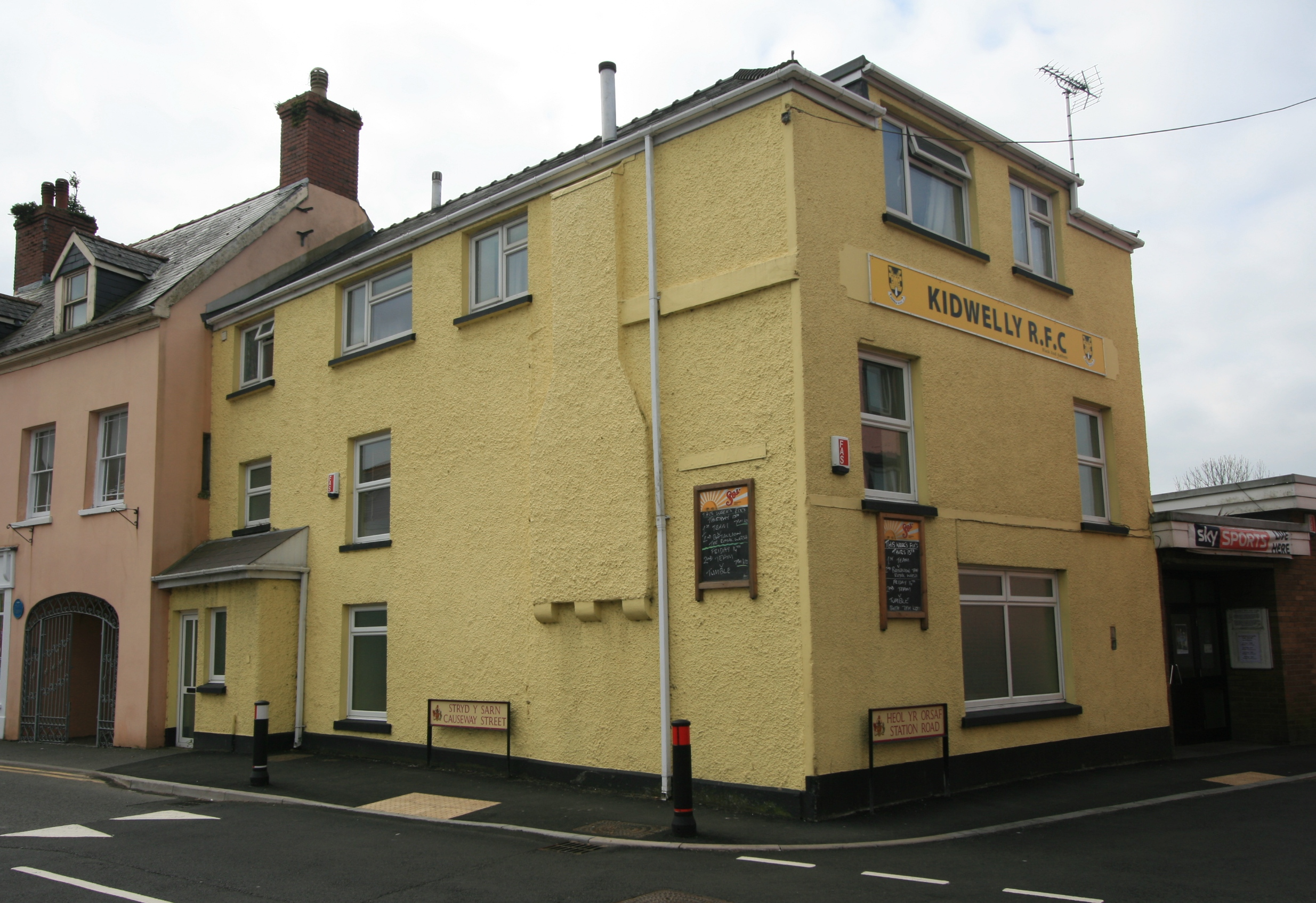
Kidwelly Rugby Club

The local rugby union team is Kidwelly RFC, a club formed in the 1880s which now plays in the Welsh Rugby Union league. They play their home games at Parc Stephen's, Kidwelly. Parc Stephen's is also the home venue of local football, cricket and lawn bowls teams. The football team is Kidwelly Town AFC. Pembrey Circuit is about 3 miles away hosting races and rallies.

== See also ==
- Kidwelly sex cult
