= District of Llanelli =

Former district of Dyfed, Wales

Coordinates: 51.679°N 4.163°W

Llanelli
- Population
  - 1971: 76,937
- History
  - Created: 1 April 1974
  - Abolished: 31 March 1996
  - Succeeded by: Carmarthenshire
- Status: Borough
  - HQ: Llanelli

The Borough of Llanelli was one of six local government districts of the county of Dyfed, Wales from 1974 to 1996.

== History ==
The district was formed on 1 April 1974 under the Local Government Act 1972, covering the area of four former districts from the administrative county of Carmarthenshire, which were abolished at the same time:

- Burry Port Urban District
- Kidwelly Municipal Borough
- Llanelli Municipal Borough
- Llanelli Rural District

The district was the smallest by area of six districts in the newly created county of Dyfed. The district held borough status, allowing the chair of the council to take the title of mayor.

The borough of Llanelli was abolished 22 years later under the Local Government (Wales) Act 1994, with the area becoming part of the new Carmarthenshire unitary authority on 1 April 1996.

== Political control ==
The first election to the council was held in 1973, initially operating as a shadow authority before coming into its powers on 1 April 1974. Throughout the council's existence a majority of the seats were held by Labour.

Party in control	Years
Labour	1974–1996

=== Leadership ===
The leaders of the council from 1981 until the council's abolition in 1996 were:

Councillor	Party	From	To
George Thomas	Labour	1981	May 1987
Mathonwy Jones	Labour	May 1987	May 1988
Wynn Jenkins	Labour	May 1988	May 1989
Mathonwy Jones	Labour	May 1989	May 1991
Wynn Jenkins	Labour	May 1991	31 Mar 1996

== Coat of arms ==
The coat of arms with the motto 'Ymlaen Llanelli' was transferred from the former municipal borough to the Llanelli Borough Council by Order in Council in 1975. Llanelli Town Council, which covers the same area as the pre-1974 municipal borough of Llanelli, was granted a new coat of arms in 1981.

== Elections ==
- 1973 Llanelli Borough Council election
- 1976 Llanelli Borough Council election
- 1979 Llanelli Borough Council election
- 1983 Llanelli Borough Council election
- 1987 Llanelli Borough Council election
- 1991 Llanelli Borough Council election

== Premises ==
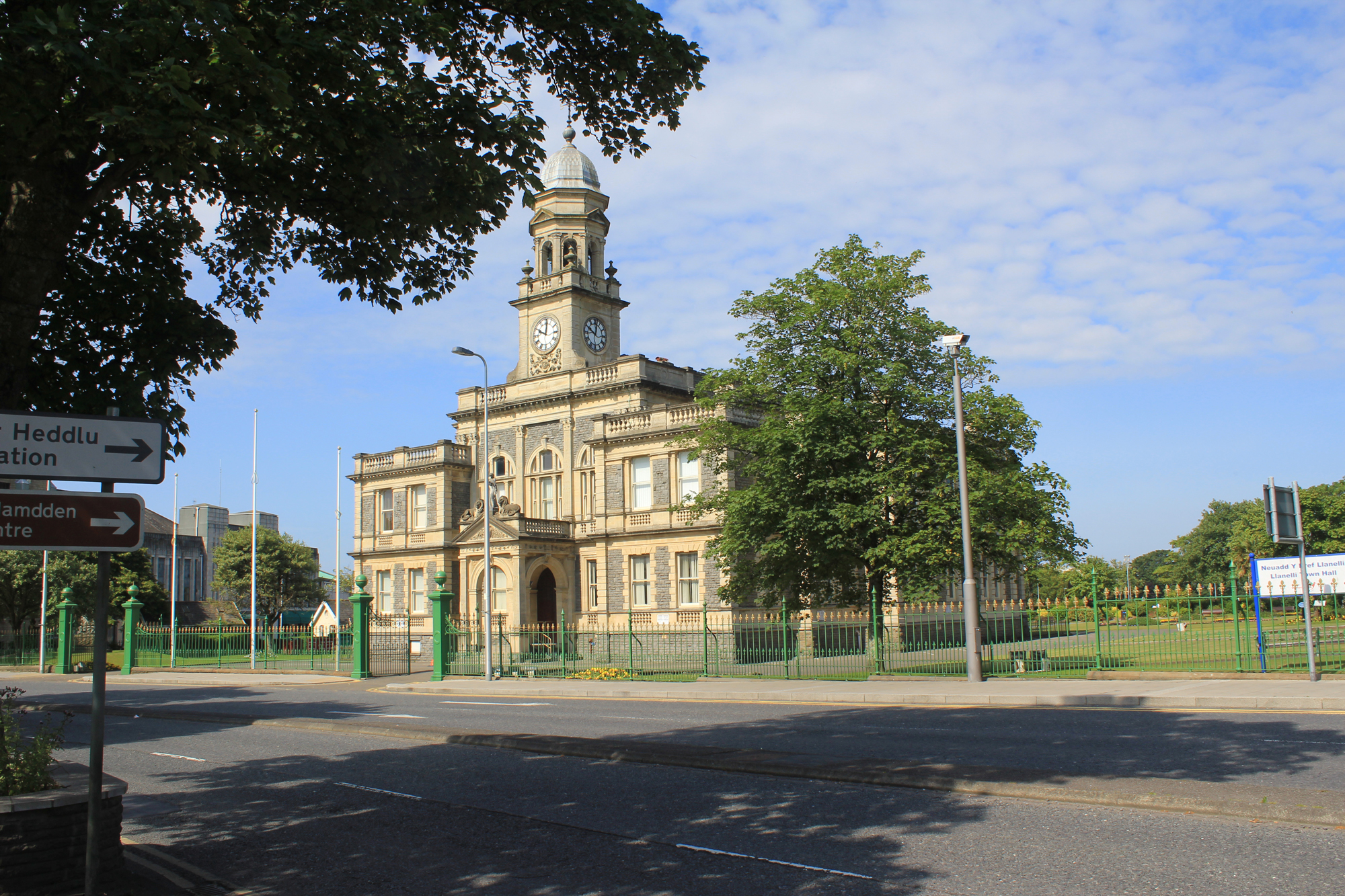
Llanelli Town Hall

The council met at Llanelli Town Hall, which had been the headquarters of the former municipal borough council. In 1981 the council built additional offices called Ty Elwyn on an adjoining site.
