= John Henry Williams (politician) =

Welsh politician (1869–1936)

John Henry Williams (19 May 1869 – 7 February 1936), also known as Snowden Williams, was a Liverpool-born Welsh Labour Party politician.

Educated in Cardiff, Oxford and at the London Hospital, he graduated with the Licence of the Society of Apothecaries (LSA) in 1902.

He was initially employed as a ship's surgeon for the Booth Shipping Line, before becoming a general practitioner in Burry Port, Carmarthenshire. He was elected to Burry Port Urban District Council, serving as its chairman. He was also a member of Carmarthenshire County Council where he was the chairman of the health committee and of the child welfare committee.

At the 1922 general election, he was elected as Member of Parliament (MP) for Llanelli, and held the seat until he died from pneumonia in 1936.

Parliament of the United Kingdom
Preceded by Towyn Jones	Member of Parliament for Llanelli; 1922–1936	Succeeded by Jim Griffiths
