= RAF Fairwood Common =

Former Royal Air Force station in Swansea, Wales

RAF Fairwood Common
- Located on Fairwood Common, on the Gower Peninsula, previously Glamorgan, in Wales

Site information
- Type: Royal Air Force station *Sector Station 1941-49
- Code: FC
- Owner: Air Ministry
- Operator: Royal Air Force
- Controlled by: RAF Fighter Command * No. 10 Group RAF

Location
- Shown within Swansea RAF Fairwood Common (the United Kingdom)
- Coordinates: 51°36′19″N 004°04′04″W

Site history
- Built: 1940/41
- In use: June 1941 – 1949
- Battles/wars: European theatre of World War II

Garrison information
- Designations: Within Areas of Outstanding Natural Beauty in Wales

Airfield information
- Elevation: 82 metres (269 ft) AMSL
Runways
Direction	Length and surface
05/23	1,600 yards (1,463 m) Asphalt concrete and Sealcoat
11/29	1,350 yards (1,234 m) Asphalt concrete and Sealcoat
15/33	1,350 yards (1,234 m) Asphalt concrete and Sealcoat

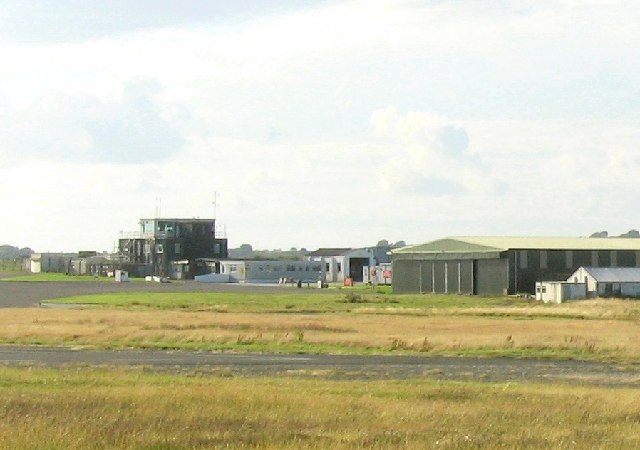
Swansea Airport, what was RAF Fairwood Common

Royal Air Force Fairwood Common, or more simply RAF Fairwood Common, (IATA: EGFH, ICAO: SWS) is a former Royal Air Force sector station located on Fairwood Common, on the Gower Peninsula, to the west of Swansea. It is now the location of Swansea Airport.

== History ==
=== Station design ===
The airfield had six pens for single-engine aircraft, two aircraft to a pen, and nine pens for twin-engined aircraft along its western and southern sides, and the perimeter track had hard-standing for twenty nine fighter aircraft. It was constructed with three runways; 23/05 northeast-southeast 1463 m (4800 ft) long; 29/11 west-east 1249 m (4100 ft) long; and 33/15 northwest-southeast 1249 m (4100 ft) long. It had an extensive system of taxiways running parallel to and interconnecting with, the runways. The airfield had three Bellman hangars and eight Blister hangars.

=== RAF Fighter Command ===
Taking a year to construct and using a large amount of industrial spoil to level and stabilise what was a bog, RAF Fairwood Common opened under No. 10 Group RAF, on the 15 June 1941. Built as a day and night fighter station elements of the first day fighter squadron arrived on 14 June 1941 (79 Squadron equipped with Hawker Hurricane aircraft), shortly followed by the first night fighter squadron (a flight of 600 Squadron equipped with Bristol Beaufighter Mk.II aircraft) and by the end of June 1941 a second Hurricane equipped day fighter squadron arrived (No. 317 Polish Fighter Squadron). On the 25 October 1941 RAF Fairwood Common became a sector station. All aspects of the air defence of South Wales was covered by the Fairwood Sector. From December 1941 the forward airfield RAF Angle became part of the sector.

On 23 January 1942, No. 615 Squadron (County of Surrey) Auxiliary Air Force, arrived from RAF Angle, equipped with Hawker Hurricane fighters, operating there until 17 March when the squadron moved by train to Liverpool Docks, boarding the Johan van Oldenbarnevelt. On 20 March the ship moved to the Firth of Clyde and then, filled with Army and RAF personnel, on 23 March it sailed in convoy to India.

In November 1943 No. 456 Squadron RAAF arrived from RAF Colerne, equipped with a mix of de Havilland Mosquito II and VI aircraft. On 29 January 1944 it re-equipped with Mosquito NF XVII, but by the end of February the squadron had moved to RAF Ford in Sussex. No. 68 Squadron RAF then arrived which was notably the last squadron in the UK to be equipped with Bristol Beaufighter night fighter aircraft. The squadron left RAF Fairwood Common in June 1944 and the airfield ceased to be an operational base.

RAF Fairwood Common carried out the function of Armament Practice Camp, for the squadrons of No. 83 Group RAF and No. 84 Group RAF of the RAF Second Tactical Air Force, when in October 1943, No. 11 Armament Practice Camp (APC) was formed at the airbase. In August 1944 it was joined by No. 18 Armament Practice Camp. In July 1945 they joined to become No. 1 Armament Practice Station which remained until the spring of 1946. During this period a large number of different aircraft types visited RAF Fairwood Common, with around forty squadrons taking part in firing practice between 1943 and 1946.

RAF Fairwood Common was targeted by the Luftwaffe. The worst raid was on the 16 February 1943 when eleven Luftwaffe bombers attacked and bombed the airfield. Unfortunately three female auxiliary of the British Royal Air Force (WAAF) were killed. Two Luftwaffe Dornier Do 217 bomber aircraft were shot down by a Bristol Beaufighter of No. 125 Squadron RAF.

No. 595 Squadron RAF, an anti-aircraft co-operation unit with duties over central and southern Wales, became a permanent resident at RAF Fairwood Common from 27 April 1946. The unit was equipped with Miles Martinet I, a target tug aircraft, Airspeed Oxford I and II, a twin-engine monoplane aircraft, and Supermarine Spitfire Mk XI and LF.XVIe, a single-seat fighter aircraft. A shortage of pilots meant it took two days to move all the squadron’s aircraft. No 691 Squadron RAF used their Airspeed Oxford aircraft to ferry 'on loan' pilots back to RAF Aberporth. No. 595 Squadron RAF remained at RAF Fairwood Common until 22 October 1946 when it left for RAF Pembrey.

On 12 March 1946, a Supermarine Spitfire, piloted by Flying officer Abbott of No. 595 Squadron RAF, operating out of RAF Aberporth, was diverted to RAF Fairwood Common, due to the airfield at Aberporth being water-logged. It was then agreed he could operate out of RAF Fairwood Common until his home airfield had dried out. Tragically, on the 21 March, while flying in and out of cloud, the aircraft crashed for no apparent reason and he was killed.

No. 691 Squadron RAF, an anti-aircraft cooperation squadron, arrived at the airfield in July 1946 from RAF Weston Zoyland, but departed for RAF Chivenor in October. The unit was equipped with Airspeed Oxford I, Vultee A-31 Vengeance Mk IV target tug aircraft, Miles Martinet I target tug aircraft and Supermarine Spitfire Mk.XVI fighter aircraft. Its aircraft were also used for light transport duties and other special flights.

RAF Fairwood Common was used as a diversionary airfield by RAF Bomber Command, RAF Transport Command and the USAAF and there were a number of notable incidents.

On the 29 March 1944, a USAAF Consolidated B-24 Liberator was diverted to RAF Fairwood Common due to bad weather. The heavy bomber had run out of fuel as it approached the airfield. The pilot and crew chief remained on board while the rest of the aircrew baled out to safety. The pilot attempted an emergency landing which resulted in both the pilot and crew chief being badly injured, and whilst the pilot recovered, sadly, the crew chief died.

On the 9 April 1944, a Handley Page Halifax Mk III, of No. 1658 Heavy Conversion Unit RAF based at RAF Pocklington, crashed into a WAAF hut while making an emergency landing. Sadly, one female auxiliary was killed, and several others were injured.

A Vickers Wellington medium bomber, suffering from an engine fire, attempted to make an emergency landing, in August 1944. However, the aircraft hit some trees, causing it to crash.

The aerodrome had fulfilled a variety of military roles during the Second World War. By 1946 the RAF Squadrons had left and the airfield was put under care and maintenance.

=== Swansea Airport ===
Fairwood Common airfield was developed into Swansea's civic airport. In 1957 it officially opened as Swansea Airport. Morton Air Services operated a service to Gatwick Airport near Crawley, West Sussex, England, and Cambrian Airways ran scheduled flights to the Crown Dependencies of Jersey and Guernsey in the Channel Islands. The original control tower has changed in appearance. Only one of the Bellman hangars exists but has been renovated.

== Royal Air Force operational history ==
=== Fighter Squadrons ===
No. 79 Squadron RAF, equipped with Hawker Hurricane IIb and IIb aircraft, arrived on the opening of the station, relocating from the nearby RAF Pembrey. This started off a succession of single-seat day fighter squadrons to stay for brief periods. No. 79 Squadron was tasked with defending South Wales, the West Country and shipping in the Bristol Channel. One of their flight commanders was Roland Beamont and they were to stay until the 24 December 1941, moving to RAF Baginton.

For a short time No. 600 Squadron RAF, known as No. 600 (City of London) Squadron Royal Auxiliary Air Force, which operated as a night fighter squadron, was stationed at RAF Fairwood Common. Equipped with Bristol Beaufighter aircraft, the squadron arrived on 18 June 1941 and departed on the 27th to RAF Colerne.

No. 317 Polish Fighter Squadron, also referred to as No. 317 "City of Wilno" Polish Fighter Squadron, arrived on the 27 June 1941 from RAF Colerne. Equipped with Hawker Hurricane I aircraft, the squadron stayed until 21 July, and were immediately followed by No. 504 Squadron RAF, or No. 504 (County of Nottingham) Squadron, equipped with Hawker Hurricane IIb aircraft, who effectively replaced them until the 11 August 1941. No. 317 Polish Fighter Squadron provided fighter cover for a daylight raid on Le Havre. All aircraft returned, with two Luftwaffe aircraft claimed destroyed and a further one damaged. A week before departing RAF Fairwood Common, the squadron claimed a Junkers Ju 88 over the Bristol Channel. Nos. 79 and 504 Squadron's Hawker Hurricane aircraft took part in an escort sortie from RAF Fairwood Common, to support a raid on the French port city of Brest, on the 24 July 1941.

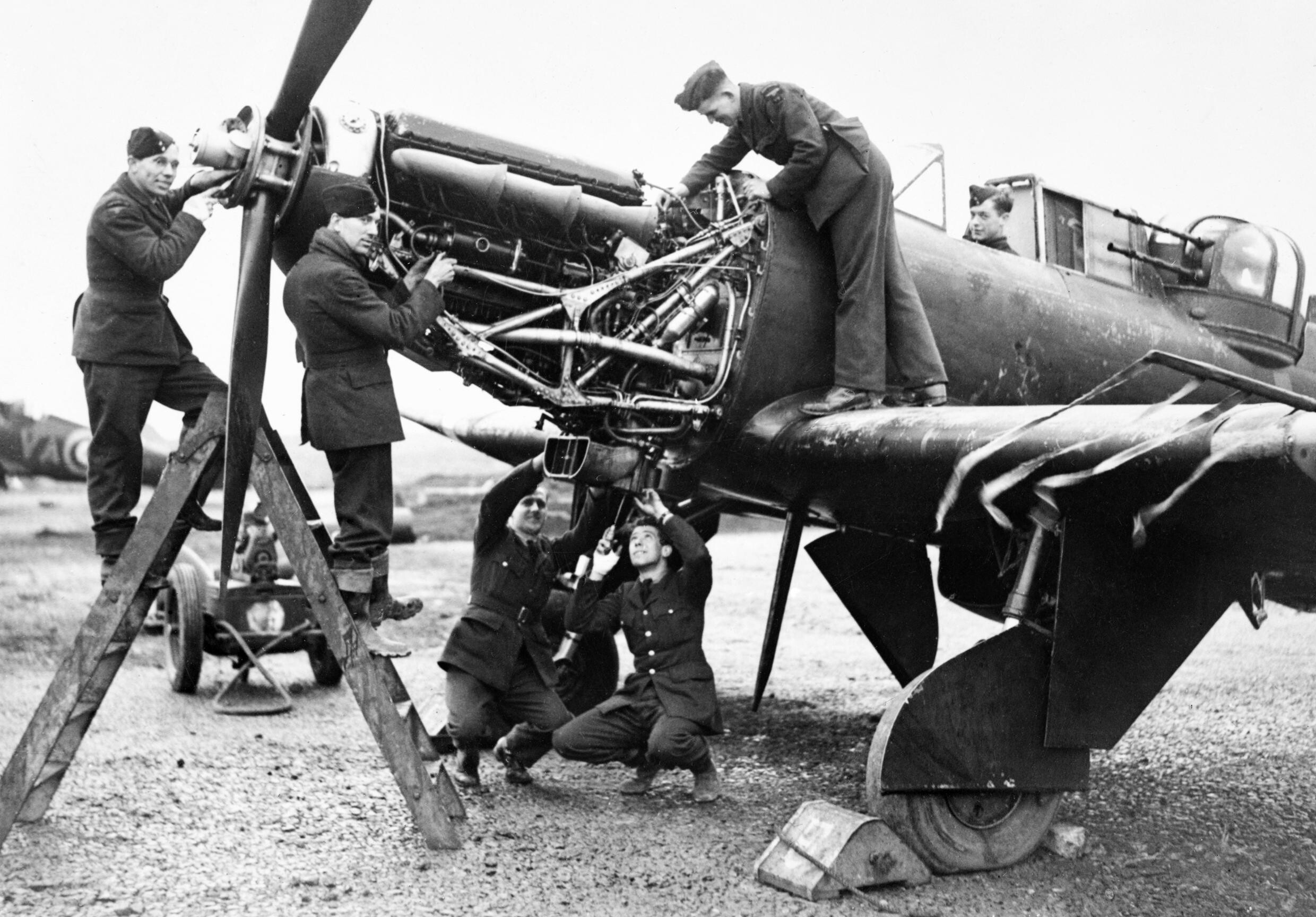
Fitters working on a Rolls-Royce Merlin III aircraft engine of a No. 125 Squadron RAF, Boulton Paul Defiant, at RAF Fairwood Common, January 1942.

No. 125 Squadron RAF, also known as No. 125 (Newfoundland) Squadron RAF, arrived on 24 September 1941 to provide night fighter cover, equipped with Boulton Paul Defiant Mk I aircraft. They remained at RAF Fairwood Common, either as a squadron or a detachment, through to September 1942, re-equipping initially with Boulton Paul Defiant Mk II, and later followed by Bristol Beaufighter IIF. They provided night fighter cover for the sector, notably shooting down a Junkers Ju 88 on the 27 June 1942.

January 1942 saw the arrival of No. 312 (Czechoslovak) Squadron RAF equipped with Supermarine Spitfire VB fighter aircraft. The squadron stayed at RAF Fairwood Common briefly until the 24th, but on the same day No. 615 Squadron RAF, also known as No. 615 (County of Surrey) Squadron, replaced them, equipped with Hawker Hurricane IIB and IIC fighter aircraft and staying until they departed for India on the 17 March 1942. On the 10 February 1942 Westland Whirlwind equipped No. 263 Squadron RAF arrived, remaining until the 18 April when the squadron left for RAF Angle.

October 1942 saw No. 536 Squadron RAF, one of the Turbinlite nightfighter squadrons, arrive. It was equipped with Douglas A-20 Havoc and Hawker Hurricane IIC aircraft, however, the squadron disbanded at RAF Fairwood Common on the 25 January 1943. 402 Squadron, known as 402 "City of Winnipeg" Squadron arrived on the 17 March, equipped with Supermarine Spitfire Vb aircraft. They remained until the 14 May. No. 312 (Czechoslovak) Squadron RAF returned on the 18 April, operating with Supermarine Spitfire Vb aircraft, and stayed until the 2 May. No. 421 Squadron RCAF, known as No. 421 (Red Indian) Squadron RCAF, arrived, also operating Supermarine Spitfire Vb, and it remained at RAF Fairwood Common until the 26 October.

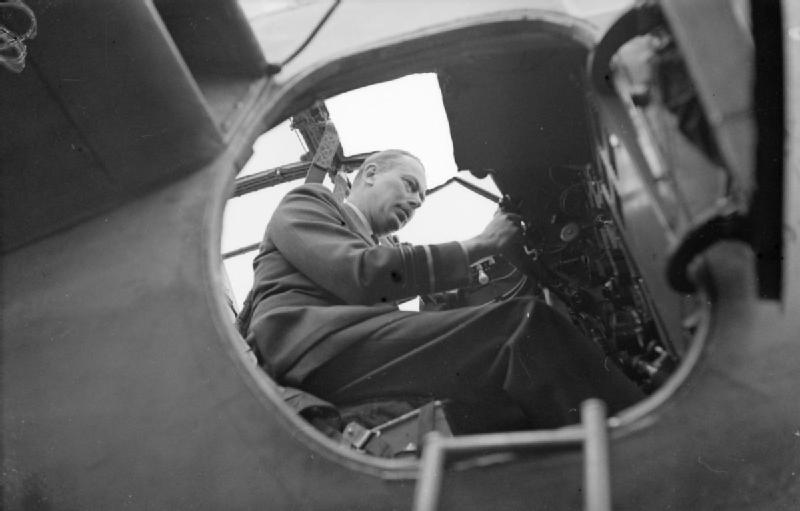
Prince Henry, Duke of Gloucester, at the controls of a De Havilland Mosquito F Mk.II, of No. 307 Polish Night Fighter Squadron, during his visit to RAF Fairwood Common.

412 Transport Squadron, known as No. 412 Squadron (Falcon) Squadron RCAF, arrived on the 8 February 1943. It was equipped with Supermarine Spitfire Vb and had a couple of spells at RAF Fairwood Common. On the 15 April 1943 No. 307 Polish Night Fighter Squadron arrived, equipped with de Havilland Mosquito F Mk.II fighter aircraft. They were used for long-range fighter sweeps over occupied Europe and for long-range convoy escort duties. The squadron left on the 7 August 1943, but were replaced the same day by No. 264 Squadron RAF, which also operated de Havilland Mosquito F Mk.II aircraft. Re-equippeing with de Havilland Mosquito FB Mk. VI in August, it left on the 7 November 1943. No. 456 Squadron RAAF arrived on the 17 November. It replaced its de Havilland Mosquito FB Mk. VI with NF Mk.XVII in January 1944 and left in the February for RAF Colerne. Bristol Beaufighter Mk.VIF equipped No. 68 Squadron RAF was the final fighter squadron to operate from RAF Fairwood Common, leaving on the 23 June 1944.

=== Armament Practice Camp ===
No. 11 Armament Practice Camp RAF formed at RAF Fairwood Common on the 18 October 1943 by merging 1487 (Fighter) Gunnery and 1498 (Target Towing) Flights. It was equipped with Westland Lysander IIIA, Miles Master I, II and III, Miles Martinet I, Supermarine Spitfire Mk IIa, and Avro Anson I.

On 4 August 1944, No. 11 APC was joined at RAF Fairwood Common by No. 18 Armament Practice Camp RAF, a unit that had been initially formed at RAF Gravesend on the 18 October 1943, by re-designating No. 1493 (Fighter) Gunnery Flight RAF. It was equipped with Westland Lysander III and IIIA, Hawker Hurricane IV, Hawker Typhoon IB, Taylorcraft Auster III, Supermarine Spitfire IX, Miles Master II and Miles Martinet I. Its role was in converting squadrons operating Hawker Hurricane, to Hawker Typhoon aircraft.

Broughton Burrows was the primary target range for the two Armament Practice Camps. The targets were made of plywood and canvas which was used by Supermarine Spitfire and Hawker Typhoon aircraft for their cannon and rockets; the latter’s warheads being 17 pounds (7.7 kg) concrete practice rounds. There was an alternative range near Port Talbot, at Margam, where floating targets were used. This was mainly the range where the Armament Practice Camps could practice their bombing, as the range included two Practice Bombing Targets with a 1,000 yards (910 m) radius of safety clearance and a single Live Bombing Target with a 2,000 yards (1,800 m) radius of safety, out over the sea. Notably, this range was historically important as this was the one used for the attempts at OBOE guided bombing, supported by the Chain Home Low radar station on top of Mynedd Margam.

The Armament Practice Camps also used a range in the Preseli Mountains at Maenclochog. This was the disused North Pembrokeshire and Fishguard Railway railway line which included bridges and a tunnel. Locomotives with some rolling stock to form a train, were pulled using a wire rope, by another locomotive. With a pre-arranged arrival, a combat aircraft would approach at around 50 feet (15 m), through a pass and over a reservoir, then turning right. The train would be on an embankment at the same height. This 2 miles (3.2 km) stretch was used by the RAF Second Tactical Air Force and also by the USAAF. The uniqueness was being able to fire away, as if it were an enemy railway.

No. 1 Armament Practice Station RAF formed on the 1 July 1945 at RAF Fairwood Common by merging Nos. 11 and 18 Armament Practice Camps. The unit operated various types of aircraft:

- Miles Master II and III
- Miles Martinet
- de Havilland Dominie Mk I
- North American Mustang Mk III and Mk IVA
- Supermarine Spitfire Mk XVI
- Hawker Tempest Mk.V

No. 1 APS disbanded on 1 May 1946 at RAF Fairwood Common.

==== Squadrons Completing Courses of Ground Attack ====
List of Royal Air Force squadrons completing the ground attack courses at RAF Fairwood Common, via the Armament Practice Camps.

RAF Fairwood Common Ground Attack Course
RAF Squadron	From	Date From	Date To	Moved To	Aircraft	Notes
No. 33 Squadron RAF	RAF Selsey	10 August 1944	18 August 1944	and return	Supermarine Spitfire LF IXE	
No. 41 Squadron RAF	RAF Bolt Head	I6 May 1944	24 May 1944	and return	Supermarine Spitfire XII	
No. 65 (East India) Squadron RAF	RAF Bentwaters	13 August 1945	6 September 1945	RAF Hethel	North American Mustang IV	
No. 66 Squadron RAF	B79/Woensdrecht	20 February 1945	16 March 1945	B85/Schjindel	Supermarine Spitfire LF XVIE	
No. 91 (Nigeria) Squadron RAF	RAF Ludham	14 July 1945	18 August 1945	RAF Dyce	Supermarine Spitfire XXI	
No. 118 Squadron RAF	RAF Bentwaters	11 August 1945	8 September 1945	RAF Horsham St Faith	North American Mustang III	
No. 127 Squadron RAF	B79/Woensdrecht	20 February 1945	17 March 1945	B85/Schjindel	Supermarine Spitfire XVI	
No. 131 (County of Kent) Squadron RAF	RAF Colerne	22 February 1944	29 February 1944	and return	Supermarine Spitfire IX	
No. 132 (City of Bombay) Squadron RAF	RAF Detling	13 March 1944	19 March 1944	and return	Supermarine Spitfire VI	
No. 164 (Argentine–British) Squadron RAF	RAF Turnhouse	20 November 1945	6 January 1946	and return	Supermarine Spitfire IX	
No. 165 (Ceylon) Squadron RAF	RAF Colerne	1 March 1944	7 March 1944	and return	Supermarine Spitfire IXB	
No. 183 (Gold Coast) Squadron RAF	RAF Chilbolton	8 October 1945	15 November 1945	and return	Supermarine Spitfire IX; Hawker Tempest II	
No. 193 (Fellowship of the Bellows) Squadron RAF	B 51/Lille/Vendeville	18 September 1944	6 October 1944	B70/Deurne	Hawker Typhoon IB	
No. 197 Squadron RAF	B70/Deurne	25 November 1944	12 December 1944	and return	Hawker Typhoon IB	
No. 198 Squadron RAF	B67/Ursel	6 November 1944	21 November 1944	and return	Hawker Typhoon IB	
No. 222 (Natal) Squadron RAF	B109/Quackenbruke	4 June 1945	25 June	B155/Debelsdorf	Hawker Tempest V	
No. 247 (China-British) Squadron RAF	RAF Chilbolton	7 January 1946	16 February 1946	and return	Hawker Tempest F2	
No. 257 (Burma) Squadron RAF	B3/Ste-Croix-Sur-Mer	11 August 1944	30 August 1944	and return	Hawker Typhoon IB	
No. 263 (Fellowship of the Bellows) Squadron RAF	RAF Ibsley; B70/Deurne	5 January 1944; 13 January 1945	23 January 1944; 10 February 1945	RAF Beaulieu; B89/Mill	Hawker Typhoon IB	
No. 266 (Rhodesia) Squadron RAF	B105/Drope	25 April 1945	4 June 1945	B111/Ahlhorn	Hawker Typhoon IB	
No. 268 Squadron RAF	B77/Gilze-Rijen	13 January 1945	9 February 1945	and return	North American Mustang II	
No. 302 Polish Fighter Squadron	RAF Northolt; B10/Plumetot	2 December 1943; 30 August 1944	19 December 1943; 16 September 1944	and return B51/Lille/Vendeville	Supermarine Spitfire IX; Supermarine Spitfire IXE	
No. 306 Polish Fighter Squadron	RAF Coltishall	8 October 1945	18 November 1945	and return	North American Mustang III	
No. 308 Polish Fighter Squadron	B101/Nordhorn	26 April 1945	2 June 1945	BII3/Varrelbusch	Supermarine Spitfire XVI	
No. 315 Polish Fighter Squadron	RAF Coltishall	19 November 1945	20 December 1945	and return	North American Mustang III	
No. 316 Polish Fighter Squadron	RAF Andrews Field	17 September 1945	5 October 1945	and return	North American Mustang III	
No. 317 Polish Fighter Squadron	RAF Colerne; B6I/St Denis-Westrem	27 June 1941; 22 November 1944	21 July 1941; 11 December 1944	RAF Exeter and return	Hawker Hurricane IIB; Supermarine Spitfire IX	
No. 322 (Dutch) Squadron RAF	RAF Deanland	10 October 1944	31 October 1944	RAF Biggin Hill	Supermarine Spitfire LF IXE	
No. 329 (GC I/2 'Cicognes') Squadron RAF	RAF Harrowbeer	16 July 1945	10 August 1945	RAF Exeter	Supermarine Spitfire IX	
No. 331 (Norwegian) Squadron RAF	B57/Lille Nord; B85/Schjindel	19 September 1944; 14 March 1945	6 October 1944; 2 April 1945	B60/Grimbergen and return	Supermarine Spitfire IXB	
No. 332 (Norwegian) Squadron RAF	B60/Grimbergen	1 December 1944	31 December 1944	B79/Woenstdecht	Supermarine Spitfire VB	
No. 345 (GC II/2 'Berry') Squadron RAF	RAF Deanland; B85/Schjindel	10 October 1944; 16 March 1945	28 October 1944; 2 April 1945	RAF Biggin Hill and return	Supermarine Spitfire HF IX	
No. 401 Squadron RCAF	RAF Biggin Hill	8 April I944	18 April I944	RAF Tangmere	Supermarine Spitfire IXB	
No. 403 Squadron RCAF	B68/Le Culot	23 September 1944	3 October 1944	B82/Grave	Supermarine Spitfire IXB	
No. 411 Squadron RCAF	RAF Tangmere	I7 April 1944	22 April 1944	and return	Supermarine Spitfire IXB	
No. 412 Squadron RCAF	RAF Lasham; RAF Biggin Hill	8 April 1943; 30 March 1944	13 April 1943; 7 April 1944	RAF Perranporth and return	Supermarine Spitfire VB; Supermarine Spitfire IXB	
No. 485 Squadron RNZAF	B65/Maldeghem	5 November 1944	24 November 1944	and return	Supermarine Spitfire IXE	
No. 609 (West Riding) Squadron AAF	RAF Manston; RAF Lasham	6 February 1944; 4 June 1945	20 February 1944; 23 June 1945	and return B116/ Wunstorf	Hawker Typhoon IB	
No. 610 (County of Chester) Squadron AAF	RAF Bolt Head; RAF Culmhead	19 December 1943; 23 April 1944	4 January 1944; 30 April 1944	RAF Exeter and return	Supermarine Spitfires VC; Supermarine Spitfire XIV	
No. 616 (South Yorkshire) Squadron AAF	RAF Exeter; RAF West Malling	16 November 1943; 24 April 1944	1 December 1943; 16 May I944	and return RAF Culmhead	Supermarine Spitfire VII	

=== Air Sea Rescue ===
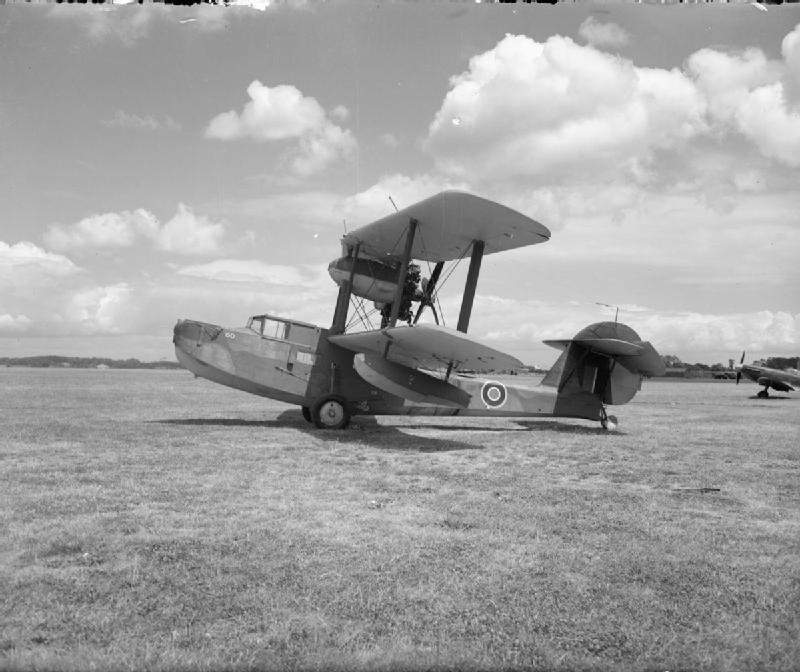
Supermarine Walrus, an example of the type used by 'D' flight

Air Sea Rescue Flight RAF, Pembrey/Fairwood Common disbanded at RAF Fairwood Common on the 21 October 1941. It merged with Air Sea Rescue Flight RAF, Warmwell to become 'D' Flight, No. 276 Squadron RAF.

No. 276 Squadron RAF, an Air Sea Rescue Squadron, provided a detachment equipped with Westland Lysander IIIA aircraft and Supermarine Walrus single-engine amphibious biplanes, to RAF Fairwood Common. This was due to the size of the operations which now covered the Irish Sea as well as the Bristol Channel. This unit remained until April 1944.

=== Other Units ===
==== Anti-aircraft Co-operation ====
List of anti-aircraft co-operation units that operated at RAF Fairwood Common:

- No. 595 Squadron RAF
- No. 691 Squadron RAF
- Detachment of No. 285 Squadron RAF (1943)
- Detachment of No. 286 Squadron RAF (1942)
- Detachment of No. 288 Squadron RAF (1944)
- Detachment of No. 577 Squadron RAF (1943)

==== RAF Regiment ====
Units of the Royal Air Force Regiment that were based at RAF Fairwood Common at some point:

- No. 2705 Squadron RAF Regiment
- No. 2722 Squadron RAF Regiment
- No. 2786 Squadron RAF Regiment
- No. 2790 Squadron RAF Regiment
- No. 2799 Squadron RAF Regiment
- No. 4138 Anti-Aircraft Flight RAF Regiment

==== Gliding Units ====
Units of Royal Air Force Gliding Schools and Volunteer Gliding Squadrons that were based at RAF Fairwood Common at some point:

- No. 70 Gliding School RAF
- No. 634 Gliding School RAF
- No. 636 Gliding School RAF
- No. 636 Volunteer Gliding Squadron RAF

==== Servicing Units ====
- No. 2 Fighter Command Servicing Unit RAF

==== Flights ====
- RAF Fairwood Common Station Flight
- RADAR Meteorological Flight RAF

== Royal Air Force Station commanders ==
Note: The ranks shown are the ranks held at the time of holding the appointment of commanding officer, Royal Air Force Fairwood Common.

RAF Fairwood Common commanders
rank	name	from
Wing Commander	J S L Adams	25 May 1941
Wing Commander	R L R Atcherley	29 Sep 1941
Group Captain	D F W Atcherley	5 Apr 1942
Group Captain	A B Woodhall	3 Oct 1942
Group Captain	J Herby-Percy	24 Mar 1943
Wing Commander	A V R Johnstone	13 Nov 1943
Wing Commander	C D L Griffiths	19 Jun 1944
Wing Commander	A Eyre	18 Aug 1945 (killed in flying accident 16 Feb 1946)
Wing Commander	H J L Hallowes	28 Mar 1946

== Previous units ==
The following squadrons were here at some point:

- No. 19 Squadron RAF (1942)
- No. 74 (Trinidad) Squadron RAF (1946)
- Detachment of No. 124 (Baroda) Squadron RAF (1943)
- No. 245 (Northern Rhodesian) Squadron RAF (1946)

Additional units;

- No. 1487 (Target Towing) Flight RAF became No. 1487 (Fighter) Gunnery Flight RAF

== Current use ==
Renamed Fairwood Common, the aerodrome became the home of Swansea and District Flying Club and School and they hosted a number of air shows, air races and motor sports events from 1950 to 1955. In 1957 the County Borough of Swansea took over the aerodrome and on 1 June 1957 Swansea Airport was officially opened by Group Captain Douglas R S Bader, CBE, DSO and Bar, DFC and Bar. The airport was developed for commercial usage by Cambrian Airways on behalf of the local council.

== See also ==
- List of former Royal Air Force stations
