= Air Wales =

UK regional airline (2000–2006)

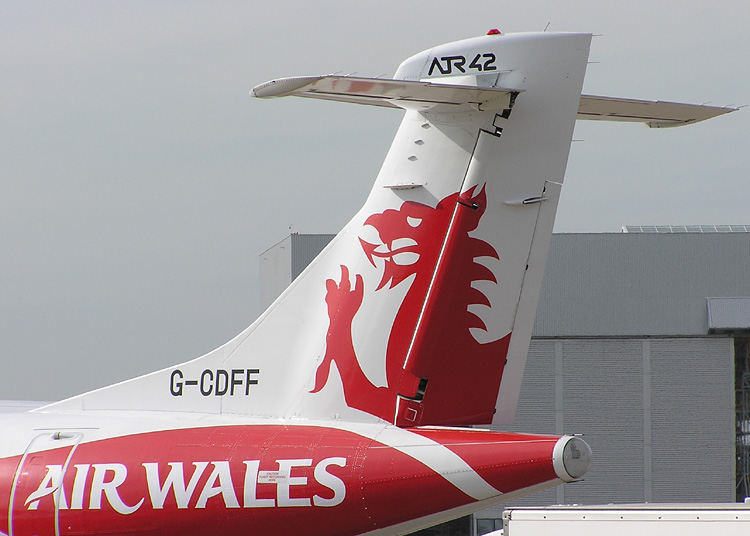
- The tailfin of an ATR 42 aircraft decorated with a Welsh Dragon
| IATA | ICAO | Call sign |
|---|---|---|
| 6G | AWW | RED DRAGON |
- Founded: January 1997
- Commenced operations: January 2000
- Ceased operations: 23 April 2006
- Operating bases: Cardiff
- Focus cities: Cork; Plymouth; Swansea
- Fleet size: 5 (At closure)
- Destinations: 13
- Parent company: Air Wales Limited
- Headquarters: Cardiff Airport, Rhoose, Wales
- Key people: Roy Thomas (chairman)
- Website: airwales.co.uk

Air Wales (Welsh: Awyr Cymru) was a Welsh airline based at Cardiff International Airport in Rhoose, Vale of Glamorgan. It operated scheduled regional services within the United Kingdom, as well as to Ireland, Belgium and France. On 23 April 2006, Air Wales ceased all operations, citing "spiralling costs" and "aggressive competition" from larger low-cost airlines.

== History ==
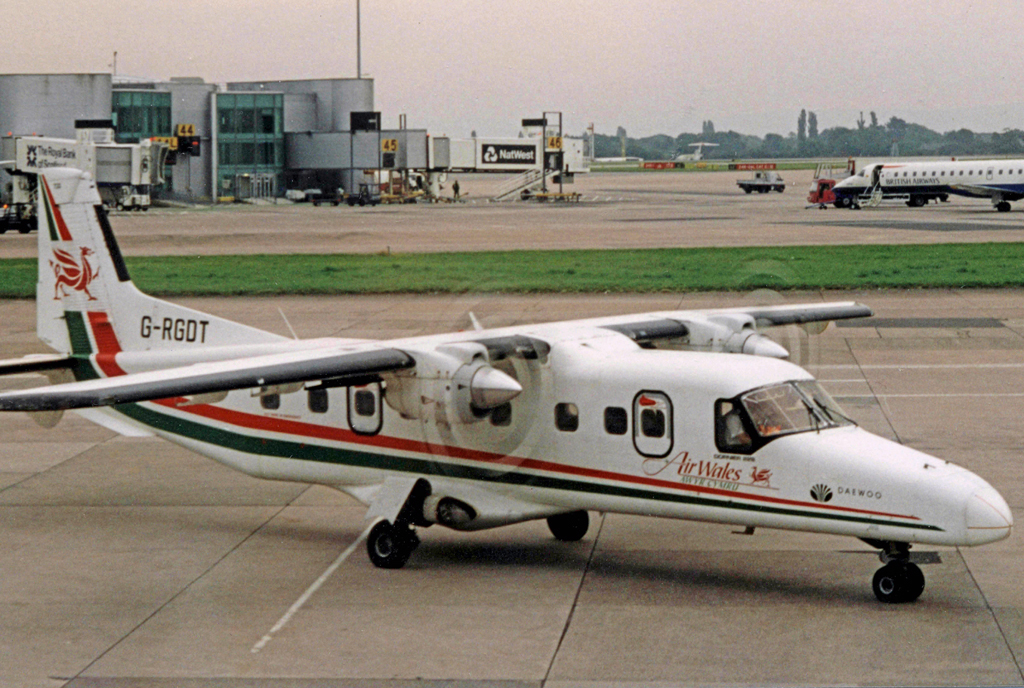
A Dornier 228 arriving at Manchester Airport on a schedule from Cardiff in 2001

Air Wales was established in January 1997 with the assistance of property financier Roy Thomas and started operations in January 2000. Initially based at Pembrey Airport in west Wales and operating two Dornier 228 aircraft, Air Wales expanded to employ over 120 personnel, including 45 flight deck staff, 20 engineers and 20 cabin crew.

Operations transferred to Red Dragon House at the grounds of Swansea Airport in October 2001. Passenger numbers failed to reach the company's break-even levels and, after three years, Air Wales gave up all its Swansea routes. The airline decided to concentrate on routes out of Cardiff, moving operations to a new headquarters at Cardiff International Airport in October 2004.

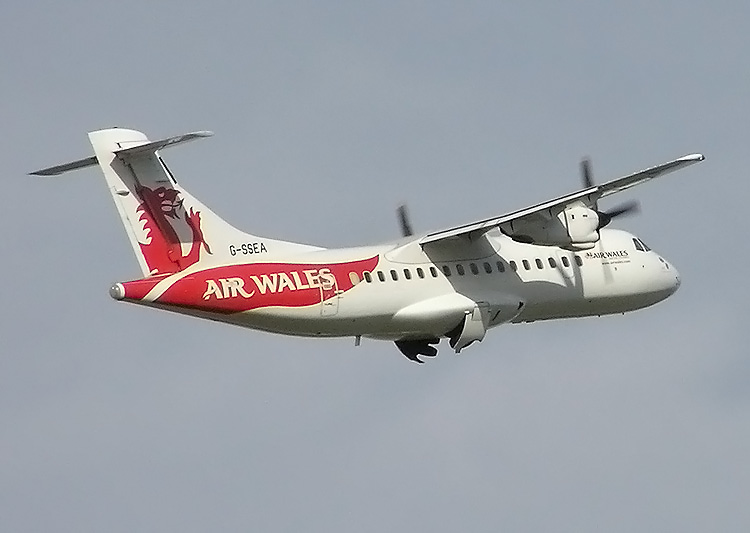
ATR 42, 2004

In December 2005, bmibaby and Air Wales had a fallout leaving bmibaby to cancel a partnership between the two airlines. The partnership covered the routes Belfast and Glasgow which were operated by Air Wales.

During February 2006, Air Wales gave up all routes from Plymouth Airport to focus on more popular routes and international routes.

On 23 April 2006, the airline ceased all scheduled services with a loss of 80 jobs to focus on charter and cargo operations, however these operations never materialised and the aircraft were all sold to other airlines.

== Destinations ==
Air Wales served 20 destinations across Europe.

| Country | City | Airport | Notes |
|---|---|---|---|
| Belgium | Brussels | Brussels Airport | |
| France | Paris | Charles de Gaulle Airport | |
| France | Rennes | Rennes–Saint-Jacques Airport | |
| France | Tillé | Beauvais–Tillé Airport | |
| Jersey | Saint Brelade | Jersey Airport | |
| Ireland | Cork | Cork Airport | |
| Ireland | Dublin | Dublin Airport | |
| Ireland | Waterford | Waterford Airport | |
| United Kingdom | Aberdeen | Aberdeen Airport | |
| United Kingdom | Belfast | Belfast International Airport | |
| United Kingdom | Belfast | George Best Belfast City Airport | |
| United Kingdom | Cardiff | Cardiff Airport | Hub |
| United Kingdom | Exeter | Exeter Airport | |
| United Kingdom | Glasgow | Glasgow Prestwick Airport | |
| United Kingdom | Manchester | Manchester Airport | |
| United Kingdom | Newcastle upon Tyne | Newcastle International Airport | |
| United Kingdom | Newquay | Newquay Airport | |
| United Kingdom | Plymouth | Plymouth City Airport | |

=== Partnership with bmibaby ===
Air Wales had a partnership with bmibaby to operate on the following routes:

- Paris, France
- Cork, Ireland
- Belfast, Northern Ireland (suspended in March 2006)
- Jersey
- Glasgow, Scotland (suspended in March 2006)

== Fleet ==
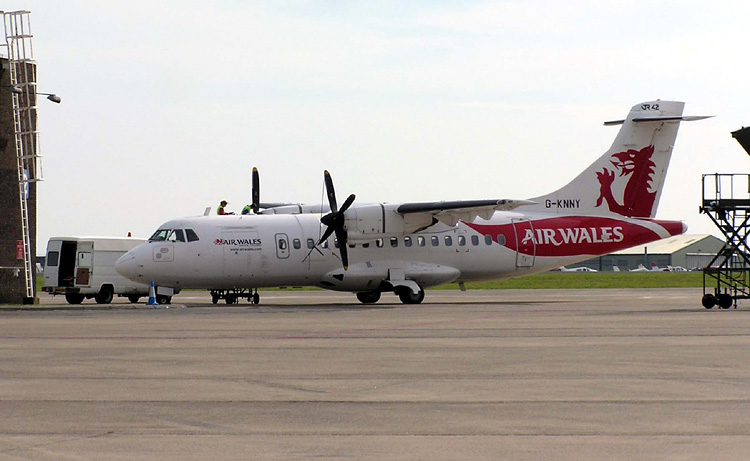
ATR42 parked at Cardiff International Airport in 2004

Air Wales originally operated Dornier 228 aircraft. These were replaced by a fleet of ATR-42-300 aircraft:

| Aircraft | Total | Routes | Remarks |
|---|---|---|---|
| ATR-42-300 | 5 | regional | |
| Dornier 228 | 2 | short haul regional | leased |

== See also ==
- List of defunct airlines of the United Kingdom
