= Fairwood Common =

Area of common land in the Gower Peninsula, Wales

Coordinates: 51.609°N 4.067°W

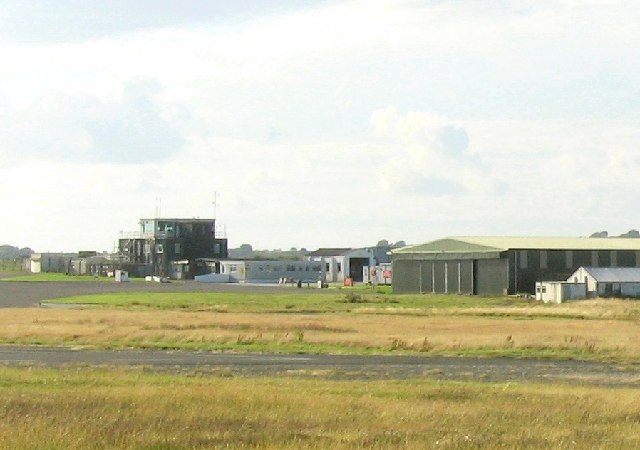
Swansea Airport, Fairwood Common

Fairwood Common is a large area of barely populated common land in the heart of the Gower Peninsula, south Wales. It forms part of the Gower Area of Outstanding Natural Beauty.

Swansea Airport is located in the middle of the common. This was developed from the World War II airfield named RAF Fairwood Common.

== Fairwood Park Golf Course ==
The area is also home to Fairwood Park Golf Course, the only 'Championship' status golf course on the Gower Peninsula, having twice hosted the Welsh PGA Championships. The 6,700 yard, 18 hole course is situated in 150 acres (0.61 km^{2}) of undulating parkland terrain. The clubhouse was previously a secret RAF Hospital during World War II.
