= Swansea Airport =

Swansea Airport Fairwood Common

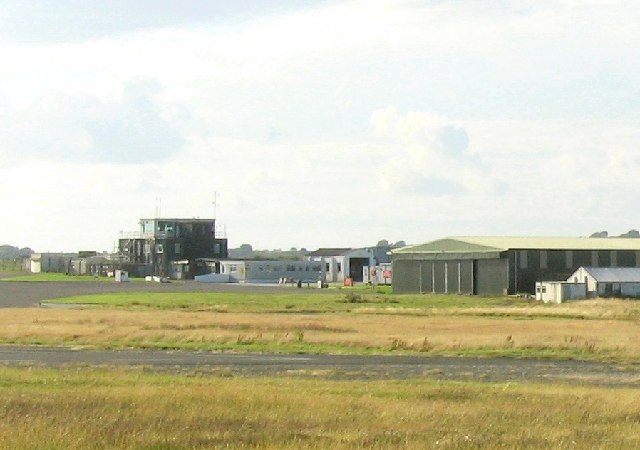
- IATA: SWS; ICAO: EGFH

Summary
- Airport type: Public
- Owner: Swansea Council
- Operator: Swansea Airport Stakeholders Alliance.
- Serves: Swansea
- Location: Fairwood Common, Wales, UK
- Elevation AMSL: 299 ft (91 m)
- Coordinates: 51°36′19″N 004°04′04″W
- Website: swansea-airport.wales

Map
- Location in Swansea

Runways
| Direction | Length | | Surface |
| Direction | ft | m | Surface |
|---|---|---|---|
| 04/22 | 4,429 | 1,350 | Concrete |
| 10/28 | 2,812 | 857 | Asphalt |
- Sources: UK AIP at NATS

Swansea Airport (Welsh: Maes Awyr Abertawe) (IATA: SWS, ICAO: EGFH) is located in the middle of Fairwood Common on the Gower Peninsula 6 miles (9.7 km) to the west of Swansea, Wales.

== Operations ==
Swansea Airport has a CAA Ordinary Licence (Number P867).

The CAA suspension of the airport operating licence in 2019 followed an unannounced safety audit in 2019 which identified a series of safety concerns. The licence was reinstated in 2021.

In February 2023, the CAA again suspended the operating licence of the airport due to systemic failure of safety rules.

Council leader Rob Stewart said: "Our successful talks in this complex matter mean that we're now in a position to install a temporary new leaseholder - the Swansea Airport Stakeholders' Alliance (SASA). Its members are eager to make a success of the airport."

As of late 2025, Swansea Airport was once again granted a CAA operating licence due to the efforts of SASA in being compliant with CAA expectations.

Swansea Airport's aerodrome licence was temporarily suspended by the Civil Aviation Authority (CAA) in August 2026 following an unannounced routine inspection.

In September 2026 Swansea Airport was awarded the prestigious Aerodrome of the Year by AOPA UK. This award is made to the UK aerodrome judged to be the best for general aviation pilots to visit, based on votes from aerodrome users and AOPA members. It recognises service, facilities, value for money and the welcome given to visiting pilots.

== History ==
Swansea Airport was built on what was originally common land during the Second World War. The aerodrome was declared operational on 15 June 1941 as RAF Fairwood Common, after taking nearly a year to develop. It was built as a day and night fighter station within 10 Group RAF Fighter Command. The aerodrome became a sector station in October 1941, taking on the responsibility for the air defence of South and West Wales including shipping in the Bristol and St George's Channels.

The aerodrome fulfilled a variety of military roles during the Second World War, with the addition of an Armament Practice Camp in October 1943 which expanded into an Armament Practice Station in July 1945 following which it went into 'care and maintenance' in October 1946. Finally decommissioned by the RAF in spring 1949, private flying started in July 1949 with the formation of Swansea Flying Club at the renamed Fairwood Common Airfield. The airfield hosted a number of air races and motor/motorcycle races but it was not until 1957 that Swansea Corporation allowed Cambrian Airways to run the airport for them on a commercial basis. Renamed Swansea Airport, it was officially opened on 1 June 1957 with Cambrian Airways inaugural flight arriving from Jersey. Cambrian Airways operated services to Jersey and Guernsey; and Morton Air Services operated a service to Gatwick. Scheduled regular flights then ceased in 1969. During the 1970s and 1980s, mostly ad hoc and summer charter flights continued to operate. However, for a period at the end of the 1970s Air Anglia flew a Piper PA-31 Navajo Chieftain on a year-round scheduled service linking Norwich and Newquay via Birmingham and Swansea.

The 1990s saw the arrival of Heli-air Wales to the airport, and so began the era of Helicopter Training in South Wales. In April 2000, Swansea entrepreneur Martin Morgan via his company Jaxx Landing Ltd., bought the remaining lease. Ambitious plans were put in place to upgrade the then run-down facilities. The airport changed ownership again in 2003, when the Morgans sold their interest in the airport to Swansea Airport Limited, owned by Air Wales owner and director Roy Thomas, who was appointed CEO of the airport company.

Runway 04 from the cockpit of an aircraft about to land

In March 2016, the Wales Air Ambulance helicopter moved to a new base in Dafen, Llanelli at the end of May 2016.

Air Wales used the airport between October 2001 and October 2004, offering flights to Dublin, Cork, Amsterdam, Jersey and London. However, the venture was not successful. Roy Thomas decided to pull out of Swansea Airport and concentrate Air Wales's operations at Cardiff International Airport instead. Since 29 October 2004, there have been no scheduled flights operating from the airport.

== Development of the airport ==
The Welsh Assembly Government is conducting studies into improving the facilities at the airport as part of the transport infrastructure development strategy for the whole of Wales. These improvements may require some public sector support. Development proposals include: a new terminal building, new hangars, upgraded operating facilities, new fencing and a new access road.

The airport website does not rule out aircraft chartering to/from Swansea, although being an unlicensed aerodrome, this would be at the operators' own risk and subject to insurance conditions.
