= 1965 Liverpool Vickers Viscount crash =

Aviation incident in Liverpool, England

Cambrian Airways Liverpool crash
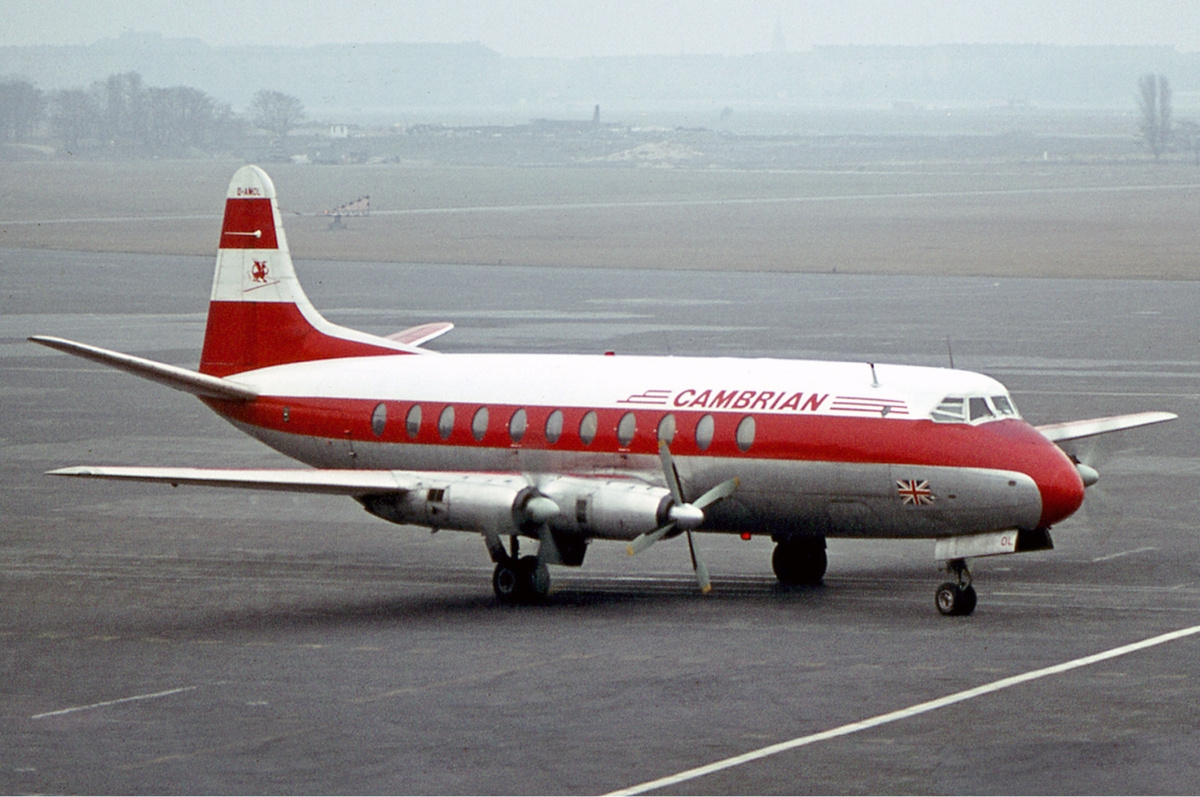
- G-AMOL seen in March 1964, 16 months prior to the accident

Accident
- Date: 20 July 1965
- Summary: Loss of control
- Site: Near Liverpool International Airport, Liverpool, England; 53°20′10.8″N 2°50′54.9″W
- Total fatalities: 4 (2 on ground)

Aircraft
- Aircraft type: Vickers Viscount
- Operator: Cambrian Airways
- Registration: G-AMOL
- Flight origin: Ronaldsway Airport, Isle of Man
- Destination: Liverpool International Airport, Liverpool, England
- Occupants: 2
- Passengers: 0
- Crew: 2
- Fatalities: 2
- Survivors: 0

Ground casualties
- Ground fatalities: 2

On 20 July 1965 a Vickers Viscount of Cambrian Airways crashed into Thompson & Capper's mothball factory on approach to Liverpool International Airport, after a flight from Ronaldsway Airport, Isle of Man. Both crew (Michael Warrington and Peter Kenny) were killed, as well as the only two persons in the factory (June Simpson and Elizabeth Farrell) who were working late. The aircraft was returning empty, having operated an additional cargo to the Isle of Man, owing to a nationwide seaman's strike that was taking place at the time.
