= No. 345 Squadron RAF =

No. 345 (GC II/2 'Berry') Squadron RAF
- Active: 30 January 1944 – 27 November 1945
- Country: United Kingdom
- Allegiance: France
- Branch: Royal Air Force
- Nickname(s): GC II/2 'Berry'
- Motto(s): Latin: Nil actum credo si quid supersii agendum (I think nothing done if anything remains undone)

Insignia
- Identification symbol: A stork

The No. 345 Squadron RAF (GC.II/2) was a French Air Force fighter squadron, serving under Royal Air Force command during the Second World War.

== History ==
The squadron was formed in RAF Ayr, Scotland on 30 January 1944 from GC II/2 Free French airmen who had been based in the Middle East and was equipped with British Spitfire aircraft. It then moved to RAF stations in England including Shoreham, Fairwood Common and Biggin Hill.

For Operation Overlord (the Allied invasion of Normandy) it was equipped with the Spitfire V LF operating from RAF Shoreham as part of Air Defence of Great Britain, though under the operational control of RAF Second Tactical Air Force (2nd TAF).

With 2nd TAF it followed the allied advance from the Normandy beachheads across Europe and by November 1945 was based at Friedrichshafen, Germany. It was under RAF control until 27 November 1945 when it transferred to French control.

== Aircraft operated ==
Aircraft operated by no. 345 Squadron RAF
From	To	Aircraft	Variant
Mar 1944	Sep 1944	Supermarine Spitfire	VB
Sep 1944	Apr 1945	Supermarine Spitfire	HF IX
Apr 1945	Nov 1945	Supermarine Spitfire	XVI
