= Cardiff Airport =

Airport serving Cardiff, Wales, UK

Cardiff Airport Maes Awyr Caerdydd (Welsh)

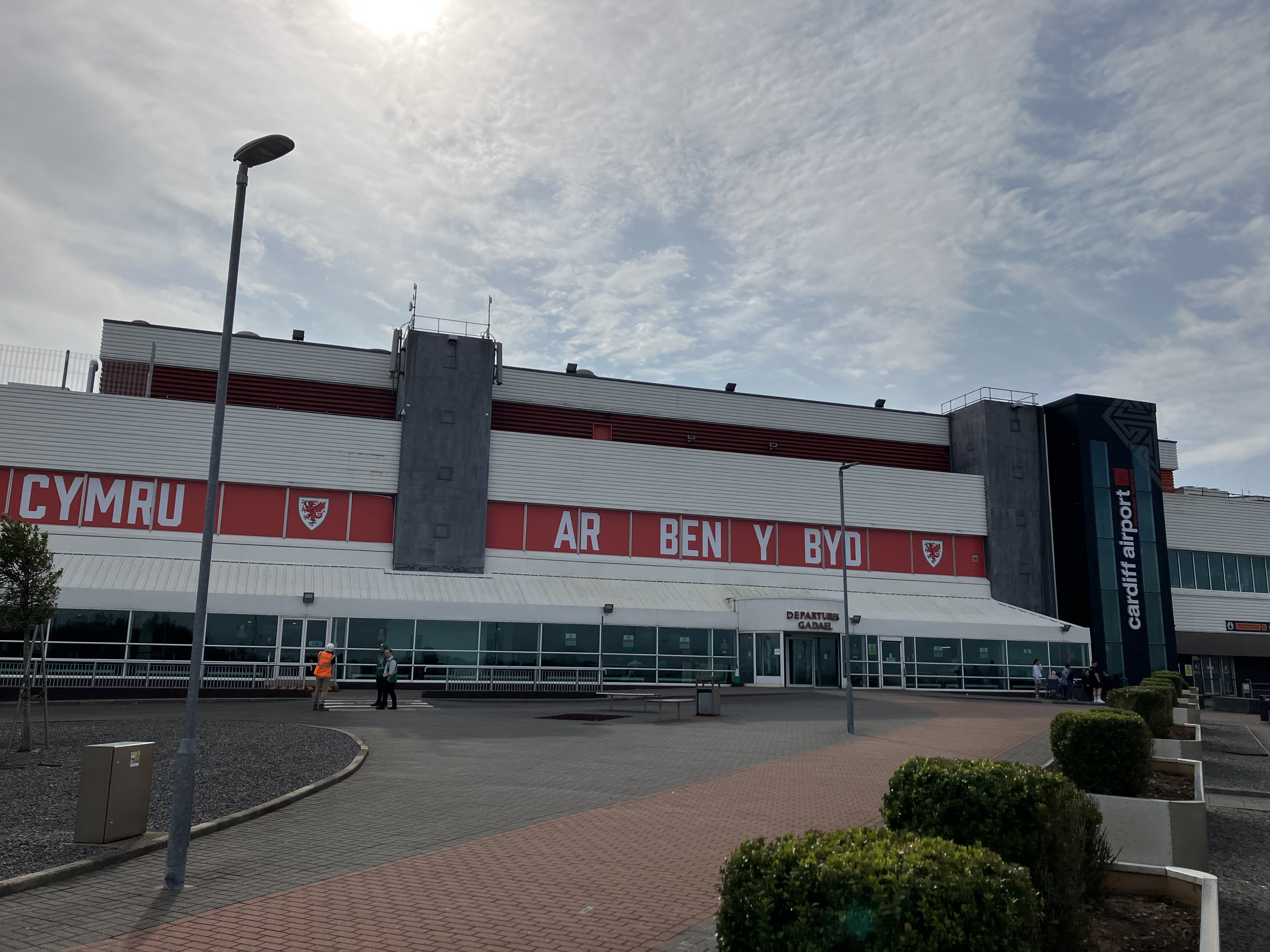
- IATA: CWL; ICAO: EGFF

Summary
- Airport type: Public
- Owner: Welsh Government
- Operator: Cardiff International Airport Ltd.
- Serves: Cardiff
- Location: Rhoose, Vale of Glamorgan, Wales, United Kingdom
- Opened: 2 April 1954
- Elevation AMSL: 220 ft (67 m)
- Coordinates: 51°23′48″N 003°20′36″W
- Website: www.cardiff-airport.com

Map
- Location in the Vale of Glamorgan

Runways
Direction	Length		Surface
Direction	m	ft	Surface
12/30	2,354	7,723	Asphalt

Statistics (2025)
- Passengers: 953,681
- Passenger change 24—25: ▲9.5%
- Aircraft Movements: 16,956
- Movements change 24—25: ▲9.7%
- Sources: UK AIP at NATS; Statistics from the UK Civil Aviation Authority; Business Live

Cardiff Airport (Welsh: Maes Awyr Caerdydd; IATA: CWL, ICAO: EGFF) is an international airport in Rhoose, Vale of Glamorgan, to the south-west of Cardiff, Wales. It is the only airport offering commercial passenger services and cargo services in Wales. The airport is owned by the Welsh Government, operating it at arm's length as a commercial business.

In 2025, the airport was ranked 20th busiest airport in the United Kingdom, handling 953,681 passengers, up 9% on 2024.

== History ==
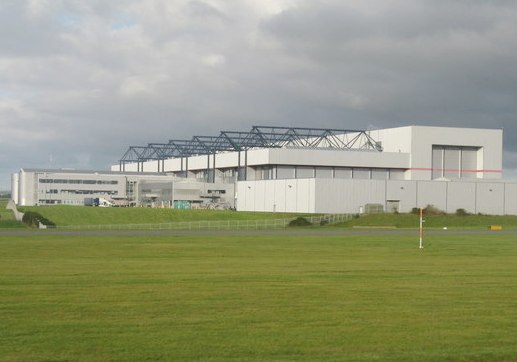
British Airways Maintenance Centre, Cardiff Airport

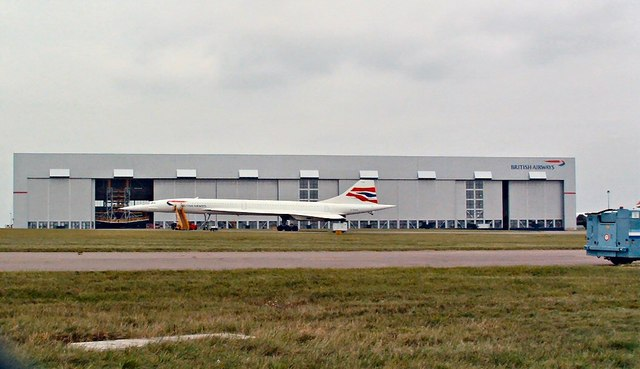
Concorde outside British Airways Maintenance Cardiff (January 2002)

In the early 1940s, the Air Ministry requisitioned land in the rural Vale of Glamorgan to set up a wartime satellite aerodrome and training base, named RAF Rhoose, for Royal Air Force (RAF) Spitfire pilots. Construction started in 1941, and the airfield officially began life on 7 April 1942 when it was taken over by No 53 Operational Training Unit.

After World War II the airfield fell into disuse and was abandoned. In 1951, the Bridgend-born Minister of Civil Aviation, David Rees-Williams, called for a commercial airport to be built in South Wales. He told the House of Lords that "a decision had to be taken whether to do nothing at...or whether Pengam Moors, the existing airport for Cardiff, should be improved at a cost of some millions of pounds, involving the alteration of the course of the Rumney River or, thirdly, whether an entirely new airport should be constructed or acquired in the vicinity of the capital of Wales."

Lord Ogmore thought diverting the river at Pengam would be a problem, and feared that the tall chimney stacks of the nearby East Moors Steelworks could pose a safety hazard to aircraft. The Welsh Civil Aviation Consultative Committee then proposed the abandoned RAF airfield at Rhoose as a possible alternative. On inspecting it, Ogmore found it "in a poor condition, with a large number of bombs stacked on the runways, and buildings in an extreme state of dilapidation". However, he considered Rhoose could be suitable for civil aviation "if the necessary money and time were spent upon it". The government accepted his proposal, and the Ministry of Aviation began to convert the abandoned airfield into a civilian airport. In October 1952, the new Rhoose Airport was opened by Rees-Williams's successor as Minister of Aviation Alan Lennox-Boyd.

=== First civil flights ===
In 1952, Aer Lingus started a service to Dublin. Civilian flights from the old Cardiff Municipal Airport at Pengam Moors were transferred to Rhoose on 1 April 1954. A new terminal building followed, along with flights to France, Belfast and Cork. An increase in holiday charter business resulted in passenger throughput exceeding 100,000 in 1962.

On 1 April 1965, the Ministry of Aviation handed over the airport to Glamorgan County Council, and it was renamed Glamorgan (Rhoose) Airport. The council started a five-year plan to develop the airport, including a new control tower, terminal building and a runway extension.

In the 1970s, the supersonic airliner Concorde made a few flights into the airport on special occasions. These were limited by the length of the runway, meaning it could only land lightly loaded, and only take off without passengers and with a minimal fuel load.

In the 1980s, the airport's name was changed to Cardiff-Wales Airport. 1986 saw a further extension of 750 ft (229 m) to the runway, costing in the region of £1 million, thus attracting new-generation jet aircraft to the airport. Transatlantic links were developed, with charter flights to Florida, in addition to the previously established links with Canada. The runway extension, enabling the airport to handle 747 jumbo jets, was instrumental in attracting the British Airways maintenance facility to the airport. The maintenance hangar is one of the largest in the world at 250 m × 175 m (820 ft × 574 ft), providing heavy airframe and engineering maintenance for the British Airways fleet and third party carriers.

=== Privatisation ===
In April 1995, as a result of planned local government reorganisation in Wales, the airport company was privatised; the shares were sold to property and development firm TBI plc.

In December 1995, Heli-air Wales began training helicopter pilots from the airport. It moved operations to Swansea Airport in 1999.

The airport is home to a purpose-built maintenance base for British Airways, maintaining its wide-bodied, long-haul aircraft. It is also home to a variety of aerospace-oriented firms and colleges, such as CAVC International Centre for Airline Training.

The airport was the main base for four local airlines: Cambrian Airways from 1935 to 1976, Airways International Cymru until the airline ceased operations in 1988, Inter European Airways until 1993 and Air Wales until the airline ceased scheduled operations in March 2006.

In 1996, Cardiff was one of the first airports the Irish low-cost carrier Ryanair used for its "no frills" services using second-hand Boeing 737-200s on a short hop from Dublin.

=== 2000s ===
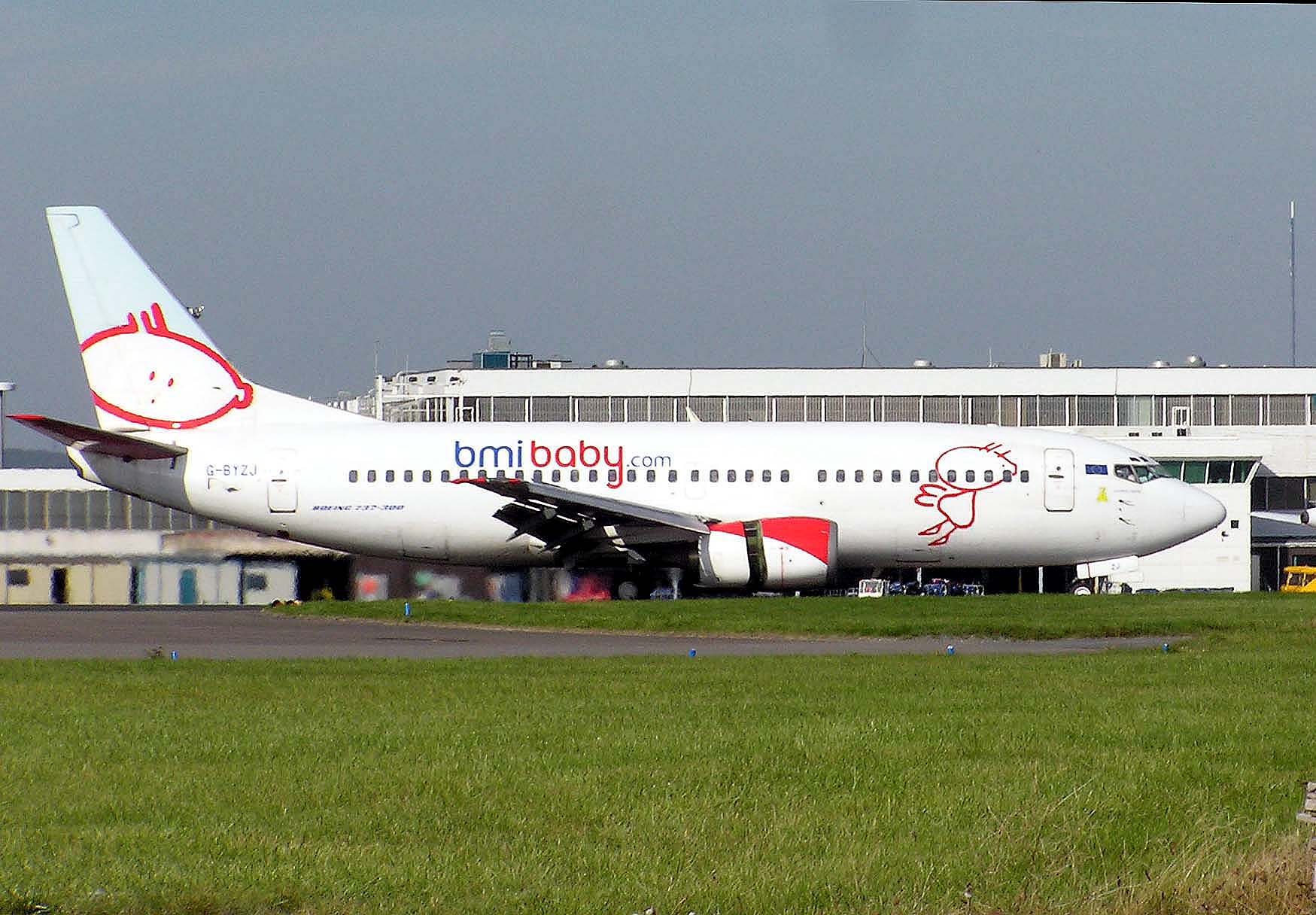
A bmibaby Boeing 737-300 at the airport in 2009.

By 2006, Ryanair had withdrawn from the airport, ending five years of daily service on the Cardiff to Dublin route. The withdrawal was due to a very public falling out with the airport over charges. On 15 May 2014, it was announced that Ryanair would return to the airport.

Following a survey conducted by the airport operator in 2008 as part of a campaign to attract additional business routes, popular destinations such as Aberdeen, Frankfurt, Düsseldorf, Brussels, and Scandinavian cities were identified as lacking a current link. The airport planned to hold up to 25 meetings with airlines during May and June 2008 to support the case for more routes.

The airport was used by 2.1 million passengers in 2008, but this had fallen to around 859,805 passengers by 2022, according to the United Kingdom Civil Aviation Authority, making it the 20th busiest airport in the UK in terms of passenger numbers. On 2 March 2009, the airport's management revealed a name change for the airport along with initial development plans to improve the image of the facility. Following a brand review involving consultation with a number of key stakeholders, the names Cardiff Airport and Maes Awyr Caerdydd replaced Cardiff International Airport. Later, it emerged that the airport had applied for £5 million of payments from the Welsh Assembly Government to deal with unspecified development at the terminal. This attracted immediate public criticism and requests that the airport's owners, Abertis, match such an investment with a £6 million route development programme.

=== 2010s ===
It was announced on 13 April 2011 that Bmibaby were to close their base at the airport, along with their base at Manchester Airport, the following October in order to redeploy aircraft at their other bases, including the creation of a new operation at Belfast City Airport. The base closed on 30 October 2011, shortly before the airline soon ceased operations.

It was announced on 28 October 2011 that Spanish low-cost carrier Vueling were to open a new route to Barcelona, commencing 27 March 2012 and operating the route thrice weekly. Just over a month later, it was announced that Monarch were to serve Orlando Sanford Airport, Florida for the following summer, commencing the service on 28 May 2012. The airline operated the route on behalf of its own holiday wing, Monarch Holidays, and its partner company Cosmos. This was the first time in four years that there was a direct charter connection between Cardiff and the United States.

On 16 May 2012, it was announced that airport's managing director, Patrick Duffy, had left his position amid mounting pressure from the Welsh Government on the airport's owners Abertis to improve the state of the airport and improve the services it offers or else sell the facility to an investor in a proposed public-private partnership. Why Duffy left his position after four years remains unclear.

On 18 December 2012, it was announced that the Welsh Government was interested in buying the airport from its current owners. In 2012, the Airport faced sustained criticism from the First Minister of Wales, Carwyn Jones. On 28 February 2012, Jones announced to the Welsh Assembly: "We would like to see many routes emerging from Cardiff Airport, but the Airport must get its act together... Last week, I went to the Airport and the main entrance was shut. People could not go in through the main entrance; they had to go through the side entrance. It is important that the Airport puts itself in a position where it is attractive to new airlines, and, unfortunately, that is not the case at present." His criticism led to accusations that he was "talking down" Cardiff Airport whilst aviation industry professionals commented that he was unqualified to make such comments. However, Jones returned to this theme on 7 March 2012 saying, "With the condition of the Airport at the moment I would not want to bring people in through Cardiff Airport because of the impression it would give of Wales...I have to say the time has come now for the owners of the Airport to decide to run the Airport properly or sell it."

Byron Davies, Shadow Minister for Transport, said: "It is a bit rich for the First Minister to publicly attack and run down Cardiff Airport, when he has failed to seize opportunities, which would massively increase the range of routes available from Cardiff, introduce direct routes to North America, opening our economy to trade and business with one of the world's biggest economies". Liberal Democrats spokesperson, Eluned Parrott, said: "The First Minister needs to stop talking our capital city's Airport down and instead he should be doing all he can to encourage visitors to Cardiff Airport. His comments are hardly going to encourage tourism and business to Wales."

The First Minister's criticism was roundly rejected by Alex Cruz, chief executive of Vueling – a Spanish airline which operates regular flights from Cardiff. Cruz said "We are more than satisfied with Cardiff Airport. We would not fly into an Airport that we did not feel was suitable for our customers." However, on 20 March 2012 Jones again criticised Cardiff Airport saying "business people" had complained to him "week after week, for many months about the Airport." He asserted he had put their points to the owners of the Airport but "they have been met with a shrug of the shoulders. That is just not good enough. I know of situations, and have seen them myself, where people have been locked in the baggage hall and where the front door was not open and people had to go in through a side door—I had to do that the last time I used the Airport."

On 29 May 2012, it was announced that Jones would personally chair a "Task Force" on Cardiff Airport with the aim of "maximising its economic impact, commercially and for Wales". On 27 June 2012, the Task Force, comprising tourist chiefs, local government spokesmen and trade unionists, met for the first time. No airlines were invited to attend. A bid to obtain the full minutes of the meeting under the Freedom of Information Act was refused by the Information Commissioner.

Figures from the UK Civil Aviation Authority showed that the number of passengers passing through Cardiff Airport fell to 1 Million in 2012. However, passenger numbers are increasing steadily and, as of 2017, show a recovery to pre-2010 levels.

In March 2013, the Welsh Government began the process of acquiring Cardiff Airport from TBI/Abertis, who were considering divesting all of their airport assets following international criticism of their management of these resources. The deal to purchase the airfield for £52 million was officially announced on 27 March 2013.

Cardiff Airport has had several problems with wild fly-grazing horses around the airfield and the Redwings Sanctuary in Norfolk were needed to assist in the rescue of 23 unclaimed horses that had been left on the site.

In June 2015, a major deal was signed with Flybe for the opening of a two-aircraft base for their Embraer 195 jet aircraft, which saw the addition of 16 direct routes across the UK and Europe to destinations including Faro, Jersey, Dublin, Glasgow, Berlin, Venice, Munich, Verona, Rome, Edinburgh and Paris CDG. This deal also saw the end of Cityjet flights from the airport. The same year, Flybe announced that it would link Cardiff with London City Airport through a temporary route from 12 September 2016 until 21 October 2016 during the temporary closure of the Severn Tunnel. But due to the popularity of this service, Flybe decided that regular flights to London City Airport would continue. However, on 9 August 2017, Flybe announced that the service would be terminated, and the last flight was on 27 October 2017.

In April 2017, Qatar Airways announced plans to launch a new service from Cardiff Airport, linking Wales and the West of England to Doha. It announced Cardiff Airport as the only new planned UK route in its network for 2018, although the resumption of Qatar Airways flights from the Middle East to London-Gatwick was also later confirmed.

In 2018 the airport unveiled new ePassport gates in the terminal building to reduce queueing in immigration.

On 4 April 2019, Flybe confirmed it would no longer have a permanent operational base at the airport from the end of the summer 2019 season; however due to Flybe entering administration on 5 March it ceased operations. This was a huge blow for the airport as Flybe was Cardiffs largest airline providing 27% of its annual passenger numbers in 2018 and meant a loss of its routes to Dublin, Edinburgh, Belfast, Paris, Jersey, Cork, Munich, Rome, Verona, Faro, Milan, Venice, seasonal winter services to Geneva and Chambery also Berlin and Düsseldorf which were ceased in January. Most of these routes were only served by Flybe.

=== 2020s ===
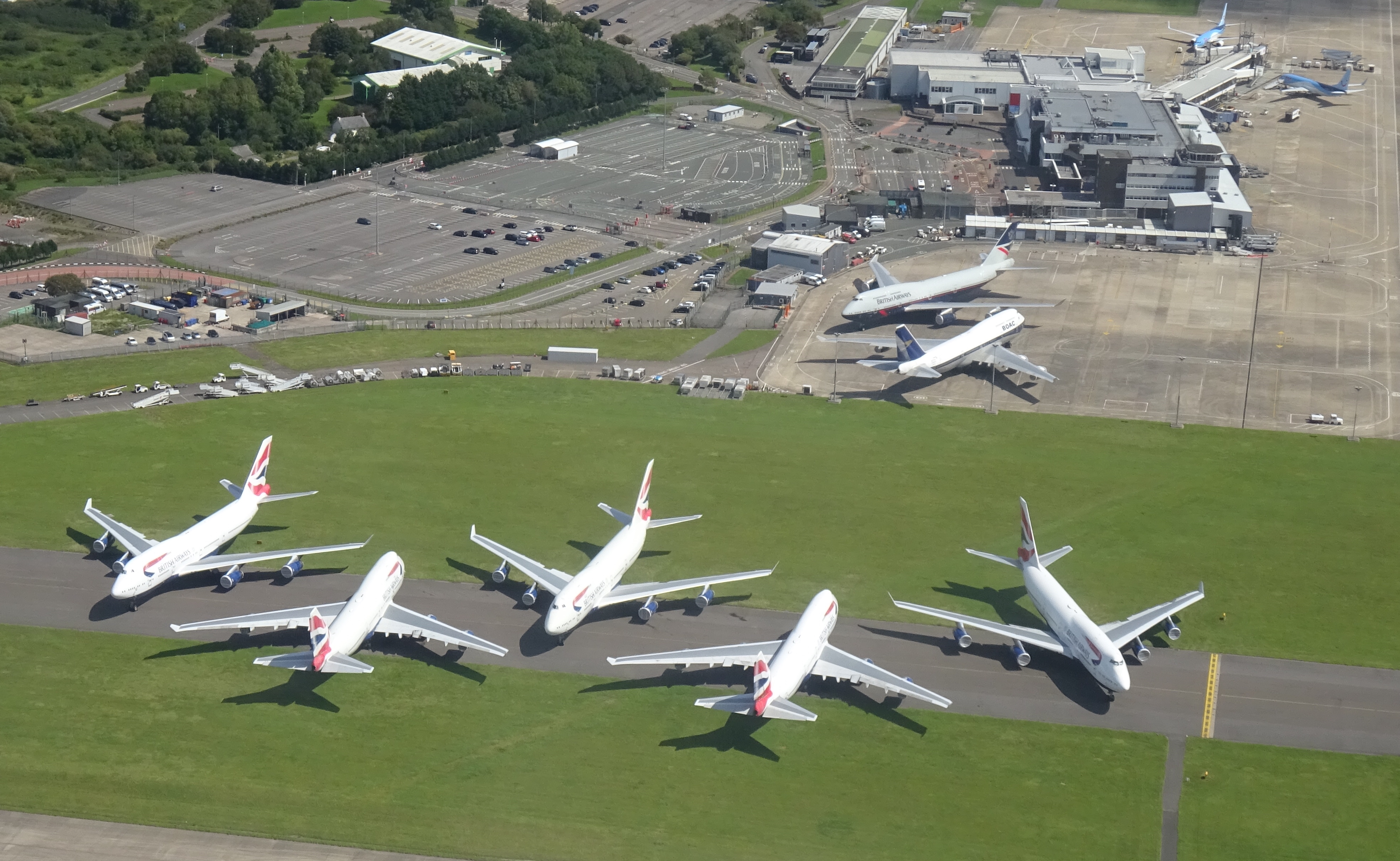
Parked British Airways Boeing 747-400s at the airport, retired from service early due to the COVID-19 pandemic.

On 3 December 2020, Wizz Air UK announced its fourth UK base at Cardiff, basing one Airbus A321 aircraft and launching 9 routes (Alicante, Corfu, Faro, Heraklion, Lanzarote, Larnaca, Palma, Sharm El Sheikh and Tenerife), making Cardiff Airport the only Wizz Air and Wizz Air UK base without flights to Eastern Europe. The airline announced that it will shut down its base at Cardiff Airport on 29 January 2023.

== Infrastructure ==
On 29 March 2006, a £100 million development strategy was announced to extend the terminal and upgrade the main body of the building. It was anticipated that the investment would attract up to five million passengers by 2015 – an increase of 150% – according to the airport's published response to a UK Government White paper on the future of air transport throughout the United Kingdom.

Costing around £3m, half funded by the Welsh Government, extensive refurbishment began with the redevelopment of the front of the Airport terminal and approach areas. The development works included an extension to the front of the terminal linking the arrivals and departures halls into one large common area, and providing new food and retail services. As part of the work, most of the first floor of the terminal became 'airside' as the security control point to access the departures lounge is relocated there, above the existing arrivals hall. The approach area in front of the terminal building was also redesigned and landscaped.

In October 2017, works costing £4 million were announced to upgrade the terminal by expanding the departures area with increased seating and retail space and expand the executive lounge. Outside the terminal, a new meet and greet parking facility and car hire terminal would be built. Work started in October 2017.

In 2019, Cardiff Airport received £21.2m loan from the Welsh Government. In March 2020, Cardiff Airport received a further loan of £6.8m.

In March 2021 the airport received a support package totalling £85.2 million from the Welsh Government. Minister for the Economy Transport and North Wales, Ken Skates AM, undertook the package in the form of a £42.6 million grant and a £42.6 million debt write off in order to "ensure [the airport's] medium to long-term viability." The decision came at the same time the UK Government provided a £100 million facility for English airports and the Scottish Government provided a £17m fund for Scottish airports.

== Operations ==
Cardiff Airport is the only airport in Wales that offers international scheduled flights and is also served by scheduled, low-fare, business and charter carriers. It also supports corporate and general aviation.

On 21 February 2007 the airport announced that it would host the first Public Service Obligation (PSO) service to be operated in Wales. This Welsh Government subsidised service was operated by Flybe using its franchise partner Eastern Airways with daily flights to the Isle of Anglesey.

Most international destinations from Cardiff are to other countries in Europe, including the Netherlands, Greece, and Spain. Qatar Airways announced in April 2017 that it would begin service to Doha in May 2018, using the Boeing 787 aircraft. It became the first long-haul service from Cardiff for many years following the demise of Zoom Airlines, though the service was suspended since the COVID-19 pandemic as a result of the ongoing travel restrictions worldwide and has yet to have a confirmed return date.

== Airlines and destinations ==
The following airlines operate regular scheduled flights to and from Cardiff:

=== Passenger ===
Airlines	Destinations
Aer Lingus	Belfast–City, Dublin
KLM	Amsterdam
Norse Atlantic Airways	Seasonal charter: Barbados
Ryanair	Alicante, Dublin, Tenerife–South; Seasonal: Faro, Málaga
TUI Airways	Alicante, Fuerteventura, Gran Canaria, Hurghada, Lanzarote, Málaga, Tenerife–South; Seasonal: Antalya, Burgas, Chambéry, Corfu, Dalaman, Dubrovnik, Enfidha, Faro, Heraklion, Ibiza, Kefalonia, Kos, Larnaca, Menorca, Palma de Mallorca, Paphos, Reus, Rhodes, Salzburg, Turin (begins 20 December 2026), Zakynthos
WestJet	Seasonal: Toronto–Pearson

=== Cargo ===
Airlines	Destinations
EgyptAir Cargo	Cairo

== General aviation ==
The airport was home for many years to a number of flying clubs and small general aviation operators. These included the Cambrian and Pegasus Flying Clubs and later (from the mid-1980s) the Cardiff Wales Flying Club. In 2010, a new flying school was set up by the company Aeros. They (as of 2012) have a fleet including Cessna 152s and Piper Warriors; they are based in the White Building on the south side of the airfield. Dragonfly Executive Air Charter operate three Beechcraft King Air 200 series aircraft, based on the South side of the airfield.

Global Trek Aviation, a full service FBO, expanded into Cardiff Airport during 2019. This introduced additional services at the airport for general aviation, military and non-scheduled visitors.

== Traffic and statistics ==
=== Passenger figures ===
Cardiff Airport passenger totals 1997–2024 (millions)
Updated: 16 July 2022.

Year	Passengers	Percentage change	Aircraft movements
1997	1,155,186	–	60,724
1998	1,263,225	▲9.4%	65,597
1999	1,330,277	▲5.3%	63,740
2000	1,519,920	▲12.5%	64,298
2001	1,543,782	▲1.6%	67,624
2002	1,425,436	▼8.3%	49,115
2003	1,919,231	▲37.6%	48,590
2004	1,887,621	▼1.7%	43,023
2005	1,779,208	▼5.7%	43,040
2006	2,024,428	▲12.7%	42,055
2007	2,111,148	▲4.3%	43,963
2008	1,994,892	▼5.6%	37,123
2009	1,631,236	▼18.2%	27,003
2010	1,404,613	▼13.9%	25,645
2011	1,208,268	▼13.6%	29,130
2012	1,013,386	▼16.1%	26,842
2013	1,072,062	▲4.3%	24,879
2014	1,023,932	▼4.7%	25,864
2015	1,160,506	▲13.3%	25,077
2016	1,347,483	▲16.1%	26,256
2017	1,465,227	▲8.7%	28,934
2018	1,581,302	▲7.9%	31,085
2019	1,654,920	▲4.6%	31,880
2020	219,984	▼86.7%	10,111
2021	123,825	▼43.7%	11,236
2022	859,805	▲594%	6,823
2023	837,252	▼2.6%	7,674
2024	874,174	▲4.41%	7,048
^{Source: UK Civil Aviation Authority}

=== Busiest routes ===
Busiest international routes from Cardiff (2024)
Rank	Destination	Passengers	Change 2023 to 2024
1	Alicante	115,294	▲44%
2	Amsterdam	104,170	▼8.3%
3	Málaga	87,971	▲17.9%
4	Tenerife-South	69,759	▲30.6%
5	Dublin	62,947	▼24.8%
6	Palma de Mallorca	42,415	▼0.8%
7	Belfast City	40,369	▲13.1%
8	Lanzarote	37,960	▼0.2%
9	Dalaman	24,275	▼0.9%
10	Antalya	21,404	▲48.9%
Source: CAA Statistics

== Ground transport ==
=== Rail ===
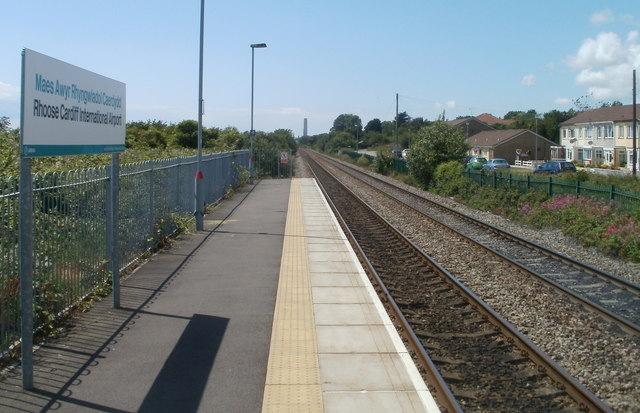
Rhoose Cardiff International Airport railway station

The nearest railway station is Rhoose Cardiff International Airport railway station on the Vale of Glamorgan Line. The station has an hourly Transport for Wales service to/from the east from Cardiff Central (originating from Rhymney) and to/from Bridgend in the west.

The railway station is 2 miles (3.2 km) from the terminal building, and the transfer is served by Rail Linc buses which operate to and from the railway station to the terminal building.

=== Bus ===
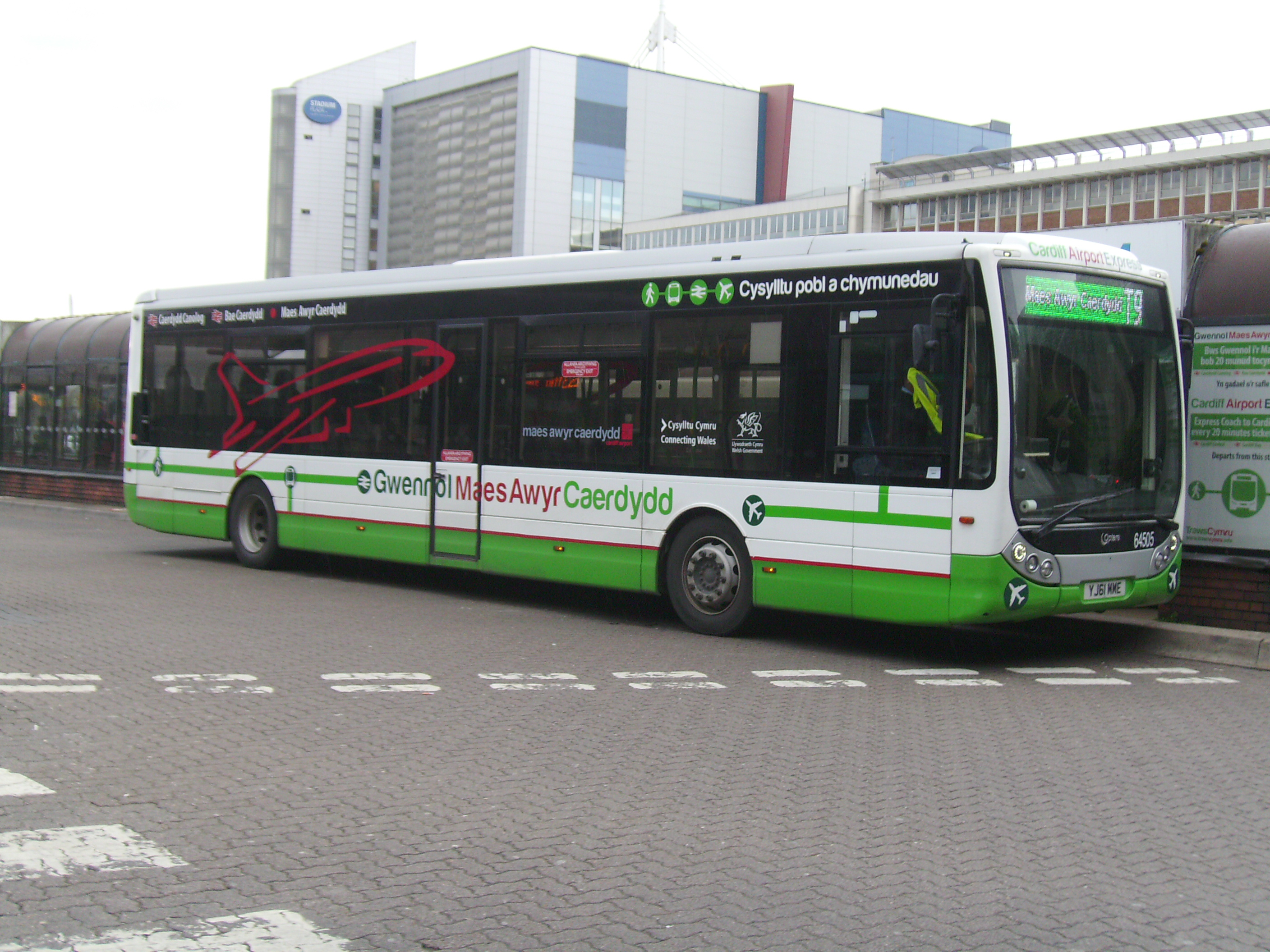
Cardiff Airport Express at Cardiff Central Bus Station

TrawsCymru previously operated the Cardiff Airport Express (Welsh: Gwennol Maes Awyr Caerdydd) from the airport to Cardiff city centre, which ran every 20 minutes during the day and hourly during the night. Since the COVID-19 pandemic, the T9 has ceased to operate. Route 905 runs from Rhoose Cardiff International Airport railway station to the airport and is operated by New Adventure Travel. There is also route 304 service to Cardiff via Barry, or Bridgend via Llantwit Major.This is operated by First Cymru.

=== Road ===
The airport is situated 10 miles (16 km) from junction 33 of the M4 (Cardiff West). It is reached via the A4232, exiting at Culverhouse Cross and following the A4050 to Barry and then the A4226 towards Llantwit Major. From the West, leave at junction 37 Pyle, to join the A48 past Cowbridge and South on the A4226. There is a direct unmarked route from M4 junction 34 (Miskin) following the lanes through Hensol and at Sycamore Cross (A48) continuing on the A4226 to the airport.

=== Proposed A48 and rail expansion ===
Road access to the airport by way of the A48 was the subject of a public inquiry in 2006 but this is now superseded by needs of the forthcoming Defence Training Academy at MoD St Athan, the bid for which included plans for a direct St Athan and airport link to the M4. With the growth in usage of the airport, traffic along the current access roads has become more acute leading the Welsh Assembly Government to commission a study on improving road access to the Airport. The consultants suggested three possible schemes:

1. Widening the A4232 to three lanes between M4 Junction 33 and Culverhouse. A bypass would have been built connecting the A4232 directly to the A4050 to avoid the busy Culverhouse Cross roundabout.
2. Constructing a new bypass road to link the A4232 directly to the A48 (Tumble Hill) before Culverhouse Cross. Airport traffic would then have travelled to Sycamore Cross then join the A4226 to the Airport. Improvements will be made to allow speeds to increase.
3. Directing traffic from Junction 34 (Miskin) to Sycamore Cross then onto the A4226 to the airport. Improvements would have been made to the route with new straighter sections added.

Airport management favoured the third option, claiming that it would have eased pressure on the A4232 and provide better access from South West Wales, the South Wales Valleys and Mid Wales, but in June 2009, the National Assembly announced that the plans for any new road would be dropped in favour of increased public transport frequency by rail and bus. The Institute of Welsh Affairs debated the future of the project in their 2017 article "A road to Cardiff Airport... or regeneration in Pontypridd?"

In 2019 it was announced that the A48 link road was to go ahead, with the route announced to run from J34 of the M4 to the A48 south of Sycamore Cross through the west of Pendoylan. The proposal is also likely to include a new railway station and park and ride near Junction 34 on the South Wales Main Line near Hensol Castle. The plans will include an integrated bus service between the railway station, strategic employment sites, and Cardiff Airport.

== See also ==
- Transport in Wales
- Transport in Cardiff
