= Bmibaby =

Low-cost airline of the United Kingdom (2002–2012)

bmibaby
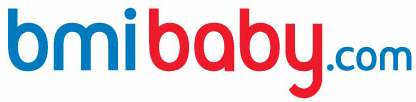

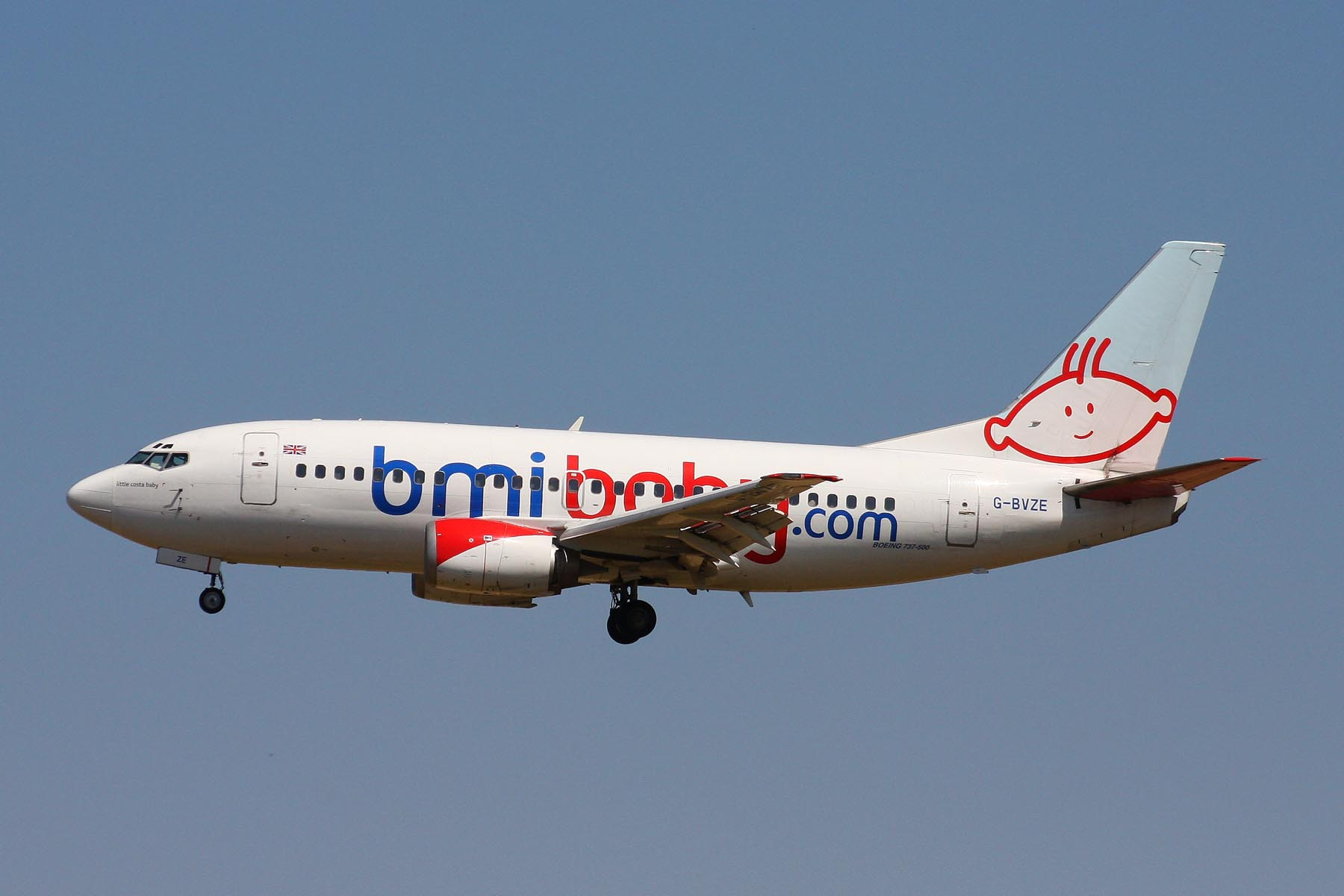
- Boeing 737-500 in 2010
IATA	ICAO	Call sign
WW	BMI	BABY
- Founded: 24 January 2002
- Commenced operations: 23 March 2002
- Ceased operations: 9 September 2012
- Operating bases: Birmingham; East Midlands
- Frequent-flyer program: bmi Diamond Club
- Parent company: British Midland International
- Headquarters: Donington Hall, Castle Donington, England
- Key people: Wolfgang Prock-Schauer (CEO); Stefan Lauer (chairman); Peter Simpson (managing director)
- Website: www.bmibaby.com

Bmibaby Limited (styled as bmibaby.com or bmibaby) was a British low-cost airline that flew to destinations in the United Kingdom and Europe from its bases at Birmingham and East Midlands airports. It was a subsidiary of British Midland International. bmibaby's head office was at Donington Hall in Castle Donington.

Following the takeover of British Midland International and its subsidiaries by IAG in April 2012, the airline ceased with the final flight, from Málaga to East Midlands, operated on 9 September 2012.

== History ==
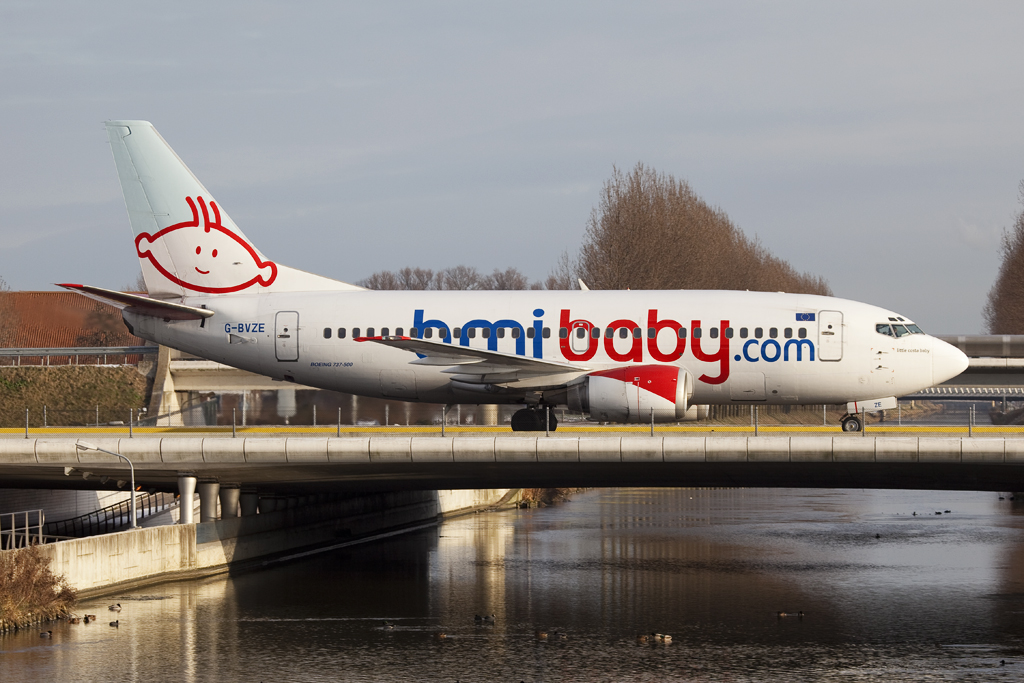
Boeing 737-500 taxiing at Amsterdam Airport Schiphol in 2009

The airline was established as the low-cost subsidiary of British Midland International on 24 January 2002, during a wave of low-cost carriers being launched by full-service airlines, such as Go by British Airways in 1998, and Buzz by KLM in 1999. and began operations on 23 March 2002 with a flight between East Midlands and Málaga.

Continued expansion for the airline led to it opening further bases at Cardiff in October 2002, Manchester in May 2003, Durham Tees Valley in October 2003, Birmingham in January 2005. and Belfast City Airport in March 2012. Insufficient passenger numbers led to the closure of the Durham Tees Valley base in 2006, followed by both Cardiff and Manchester in 2011 to make way for expansion in the Midlands and the new base at Belfast City.

On 1 March 2007, the airline announced an initiative for business travellers with an "only choose what you need" approach, allowing passengers to choose from a range of services such as ticket flexibility, executive lounge access and on-line check in, and only pay for the services they used. The company also announced that Diamond Club miles could now be earned on bmibaby flights.

By 2007, bmibaby had nine Boeing 737 aircraft based at East Midlands Airport, making it its biggest base. In December 2008, the airline announced that it would suspend five routes from the airport as a result of a reduction in the number of customers booking city-breaks.

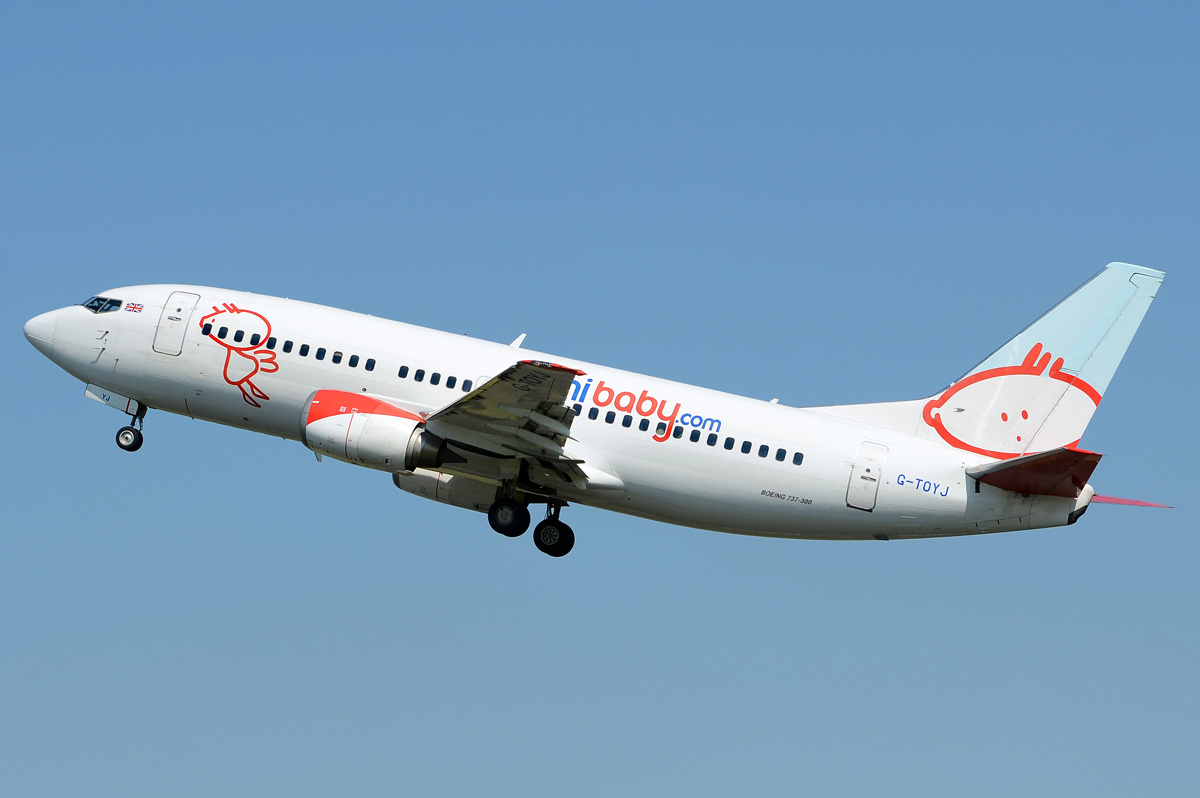
Boeing 737-300, 2012

Further cuts were announced in November 2009 when it was announced that the fleet would be reduced from 17 to 12 aircraft in 2010, with up to 158 jobs at risk of redundancy. The airline said the action was necessary to stem record losses and that it would focus on growth routes best fit for the business.

In April 2011, bmibaby announced it would close its bases at Cardiff and Manchester Airports in October 2011 to increase services at Birmingham and East Midlands Airports as well as opening a new base at Belfast City Airport, moving from Belfast International Airport where the airline was based for several years.

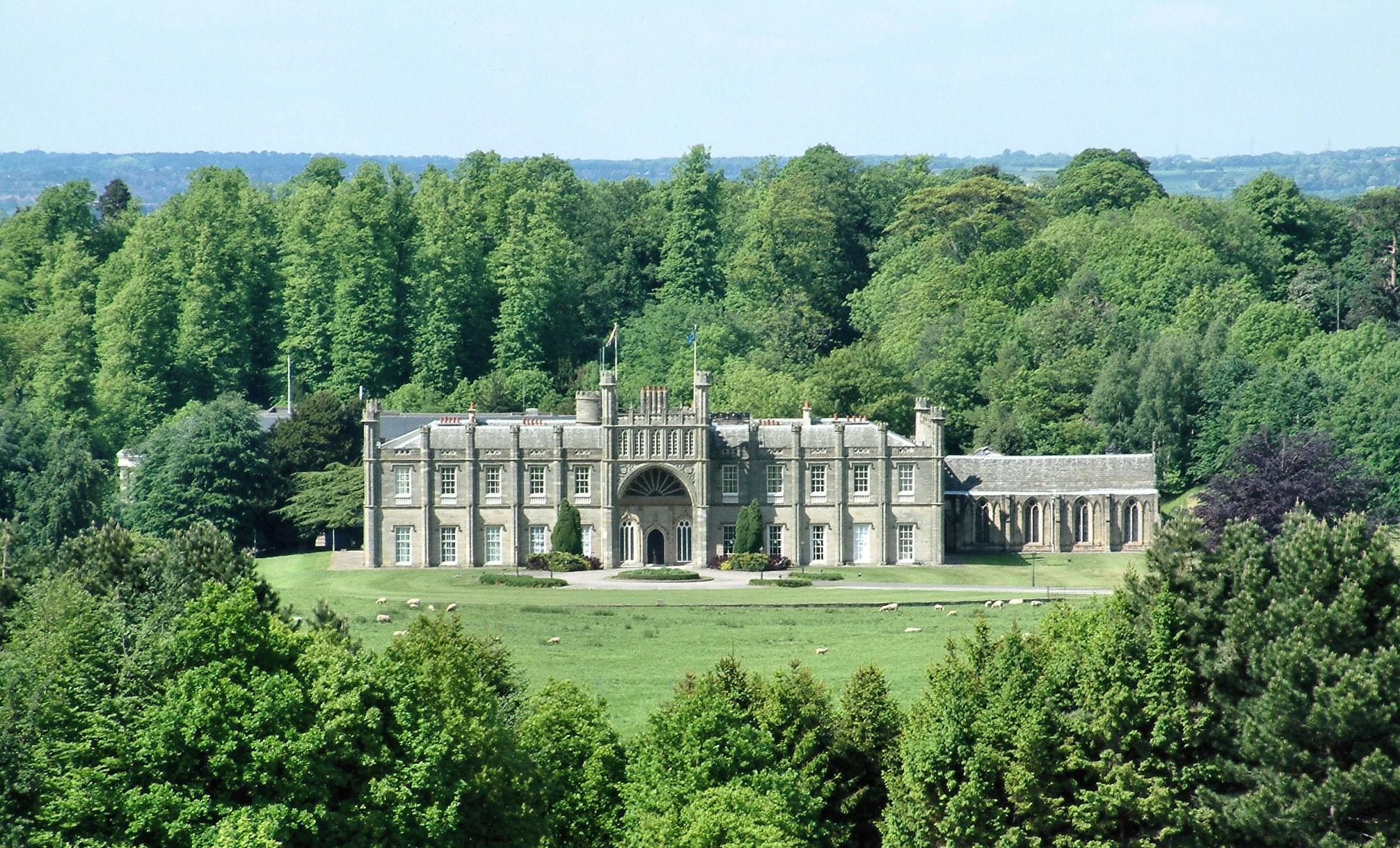
Donington Hall, the head office of Bmibaby

In May 2011, bmibaby launched what it called the first European airline loyalty programme tied into a location-based social network. Passengers had the option of using the Gowalla smartphone application at bmibaby check-in desks to collect points.

On 22 December 2011, the International Airlines Group (IAG) announced it had agreed a contract with Lufthansa to buy British Midland International. The contract allowed for Lufthansa to sell bmi Regional and bmibaby separately before the completion of the main sale, although the price payable by IAG would be reduced if the airlines were not sold. On 2 February 2012, bmi announced it had signed a "non-binding and non-exclusive" agreement with a "UK-based company", with plans to complete the sale by the summer of 2012. The sale was not completed by the time IAG purchased bmi, and so bmibaby and bmi Regional became part of the group. IAG said it would continue the attempts to sell both airlines.

On 3 May 2012 IAG announced that it had not found a buyer for bmibaby and that it was proposing to shut down the company by 9 September 2012. Flights to some destinations such as Belfast, Amsterdam, Paris and Geneva ended on 11 June 2012. All remaining services ended by 9 September 2012. The final flight to operate was flight WW5330 from Malaga to East Midlands. Over 800 jobs were lost by the closure, including 400 at the head office in Castle Donington.

== Destinations ==
Bmibaby served the following destinations before its closure on 9 September 2012:

Country/Territory	City	Airport	Notes	Ref
Austria	Salzburg	Salzburg Airport	Terminated	
Channel Islands	Jersey	Jersey Airport		
Croatia	Dubrovnik	Dubrovnik Airport		
Czech Republic	Prague	Václav Havel Airport Prague		
Denmark	Copenhagen	Copenhagen Airport	Terminated	
France	Bordeaux	Bordeaux–Mérignac Airport	Terminated	
France	Chambéry	Chambéry Airport	Terminated	
France	Lourdes	Tarbes–Lourdes–Pyrénées Airport	Terminated	
France	Montpellier	Montpellier–Méditerranée Airport	Terminated	
France	Nice	Nice Côte d'Azur Airport		
France	Paris	Charles de Gaulle Airport	Terminated	
France	Perpignan	Perpignan–Rivesaltes Airport		
France	Toulouse	Toulouse–Blagnac Airport	Terminated	
Germany	Cologne / Bonn	Cologne Bonn Airport	Terminated	
Germany	Munich	Munich Airport	Terminated	
Gibraltar	Gibraltar	Gibraltar International Airport	Seasonal	
Greece	Corfu	Corfu International Airport	Terminated	
Ireland	Cork	Cork Airport	Terminated	
Ireland	Dublin	Dublin Airport	Terminated	
Ireland	Knock	Ireland West Airport	Terminated	
Italy	Alghero	Alghero–Fertilia Airport	Seasonal	
Italy	Naples	Naples International Airport	Seasonal	
Italy	Rome	Rome Fiumicino Airport		
Italy	Venice	Venice Marco Polo Airport		
Italy	Verona	Verona Villafranca Airport	Seasonal	
Malta	Valletta	Malta International Airport	Seasonal	
Netherlands	Amsterdam	Amsterdam Airport Schiphol	Terminated	
Portugal	Faro	Gago Coutinho Airport		
Portugal	Lisbon	Humberto Delgado Airport	Seasonal	
Spain	Alicante	Alicante–Elche Miguel Hernández Airport		
Spain	Almería	Almería Airport	Seasonal	
Spain	Barcelona	Josep Tarradellas Barcelona–El Prat Airport		
Spain	Ibiza	Ibiza Airport	Seasonal	
Spain	Málaga	Málaga Airport		
Spain	Menorca	Menorca Airport		
Spain	Murcia	Murcia–San Javier Airport		
Spain	Palma de Mallorca	Palma de Mallorca Airport		
Switzerland	Geneva	Geneva Airport	Terminated	
Switzerland; France; Germany	Basel; Mulhouse; Freiburg	EuroAirport Basel Mulhouse Freiburg	Terminated	
United Kingdom	Aberdeen	Aberdeen Airport	Terminated	
United Kingdom	Belfast	Belfast City Airport	Terminated	
United Kingdom	Belfast	Belfast International Airport	Terminated	
United Kingdom	Birmingham	Birmingham Airport	Base	
United Kingdom	Bournemouth	Bournemouth Airport	Terminated	
United Kingdom	Bristol	Bristol Airport	Terminated	
United Kingdom	Cardiff	Cardiff Airport	Terminated	
United Kingdom	East Midlands	East Midlands Airport	Base	
United Kingdom	Edinburgh	Edinburgh Airport	Terminated	
United Kingdom	Glasgow	Glasgow Airport	Terminated	
United Kingdom	Glasgow	Glasgow Prestwick Airport		
United Kingdom	London	Gatwick Airport	Terminated	
United Kingdom	London	Stansted Airport	Terminated	
United Kingdom	Manchester	Manchester Airport	Terminated	
United Kingdom	Newquay	Newquay Airport	Terminated	
United Kingdom	Teesside	Teesside International Airport	Terminated	

== Fleet ==
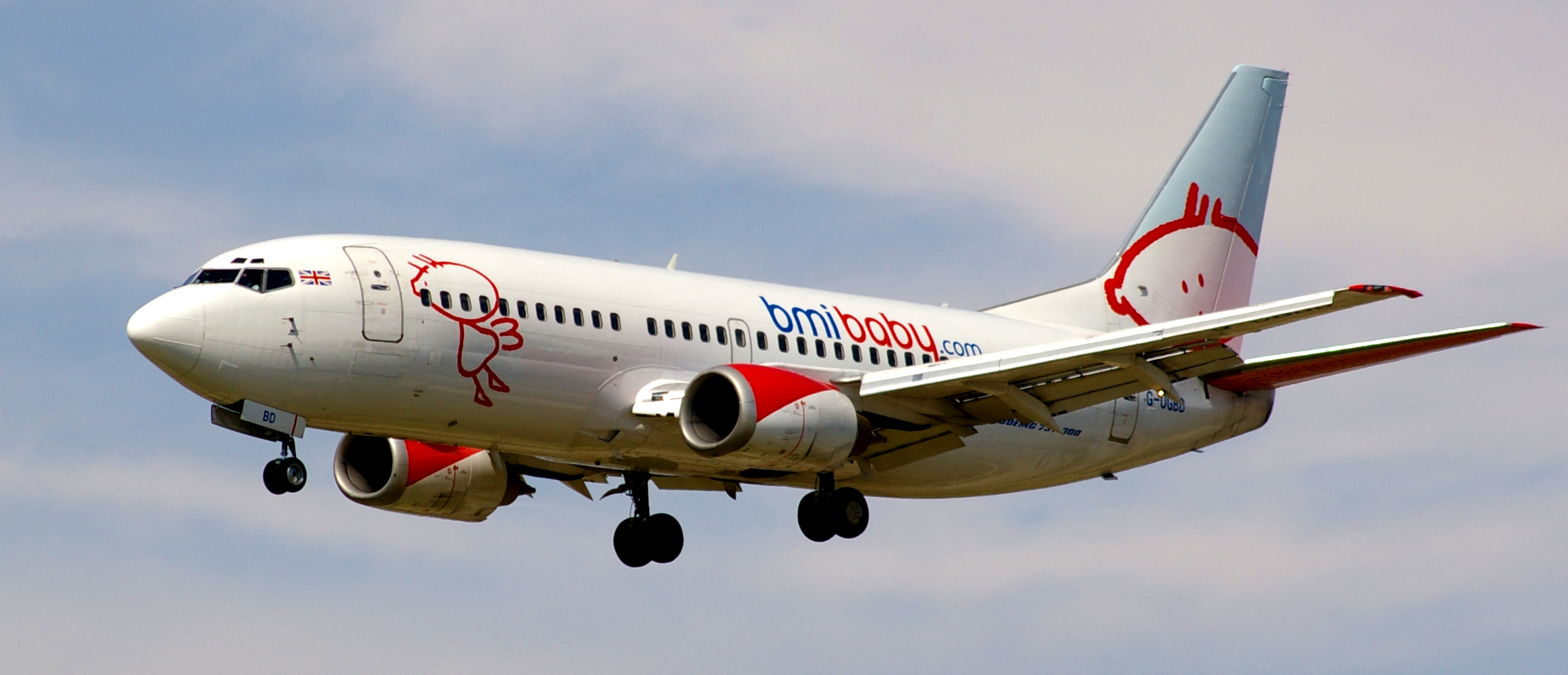
Boeing 737-300, 2010

As of September 2012, the Bmibaby fleet consisted of the following aircraft in an all-economy class configuration:

Bmibaby fleet
Aircraft	Total	Passengers (Economy)
Boeing 737-300	12	148
Boeing 737-500	2	131
Total	14	

Several aircraft had names with the word baby in the title. After all flights ceased, the aircraft were placed in storage at Norwich International Airport and Lasham Airfield. The majority of the airline's fleet was leased. As of November 2014, all the fleet had moved on from Bmibaby, one had been scrapped (G-OBMP) and the last one partly remains with some of the fuselage in some trees at Bruntingthorpe (G-BVKB).

== Services ==
=== Onboard ===
Bmibaby offered a buy on board programme with variety of items to purchase including scratch-cards, tax-free shopping and onboard drinks and snacks. The shopping range included items such as jewellery and fragrances, gifts and travel accessories. On non-EU flights, duty-free priced cigarettes and spirits could be purchased. Drinks and snack items included hot and cold drinks, alcoholic and soft drinks as well as crisps, sandwiches and confectionery. The drinks and snack menu was named the Tiny Bites menu. The Bmibaby inflight magazine was known as Yeah baby!

The majority of Bmibaby's cabins had shaded blue leather seating with a 29/30" seat pitch. Extra legroom seats could be found on the front rows and on over-wing exit rows of all the Bmibaby 737 aircraft.

=== Telephone booking ===
In addition to online booking on the bmibaby.com website; Bmibaby employed 20-30 customer service representatives to take telephone queries and bookings. Prior to November 2005 the team were located in Glasgow. From November 2005, the team was based in Belfast working in the TeleTech customer contact centre. The call centre was then moved to Delhi, India and remained there until the firm's closure in 2012.

== Sponsorship ==
Bmibaby began to sponsor regional weather forecasts on ITV from shortly after the airline's launch, starting in the Central region in 2002 and ending in the Granada region in early 2005. The sponsorship lasted for several years until new sponsorships took over between 2009 & 2011.
