= Cambrian Airways =

1935–1974 British regional airline

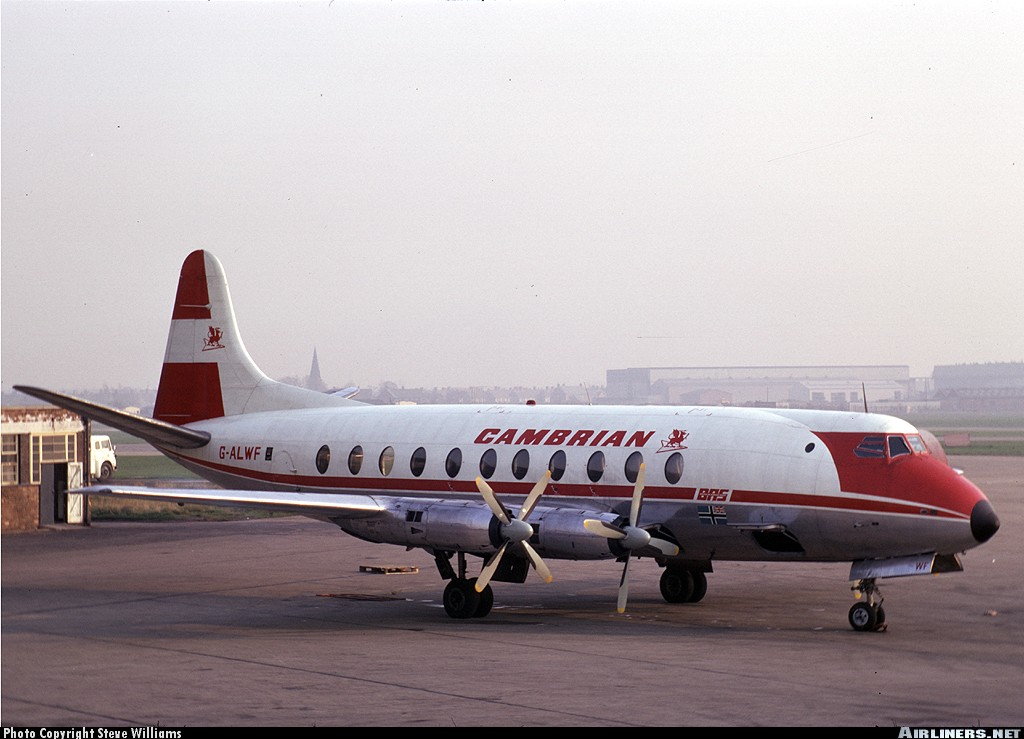
- Vickers Viscount 701
IATA	ICAO	Call sign
CS	CS	CAMBRIAN
- Founded: 25 April 1935 (as Cambrian Air Services)
- Ceased operations: 1 April 1974 (merged with BOAC, BEA and Northeast Airlines to form British Airways)
- Operating bases: Cardiff; Liverpool
- Headquarters: Cardiff, Wales

Cambrian Airways was an airline based in the United Kingdom which ran operations from Cardiff and Liverpool airports between 1935 and 1974. It was incorporated into British Airways when BOAC, BEA, Cambrian and Northeast fully merged on 1 April 1976.

== History ==
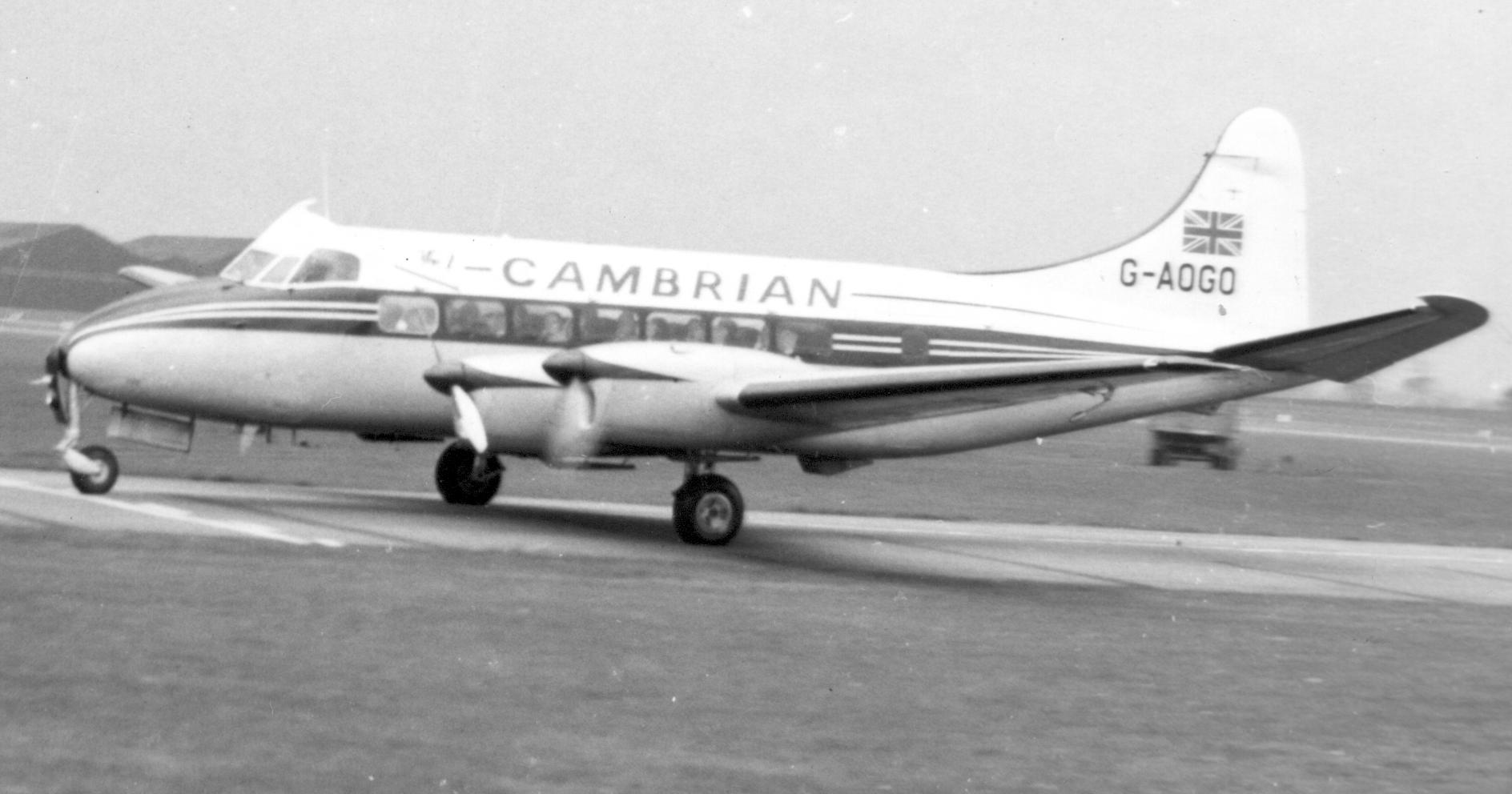
De Havilland Heron at Manchester Airport in 1958

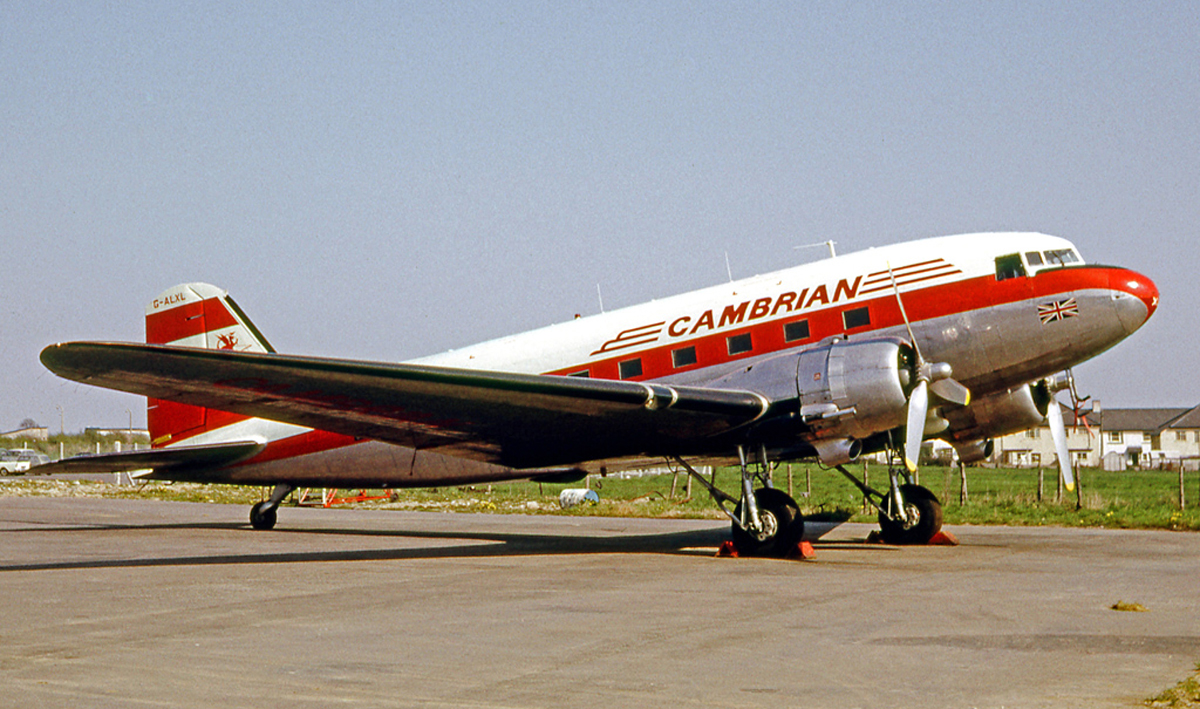
Douglas DC-3 at Cardiff Airport in 1966

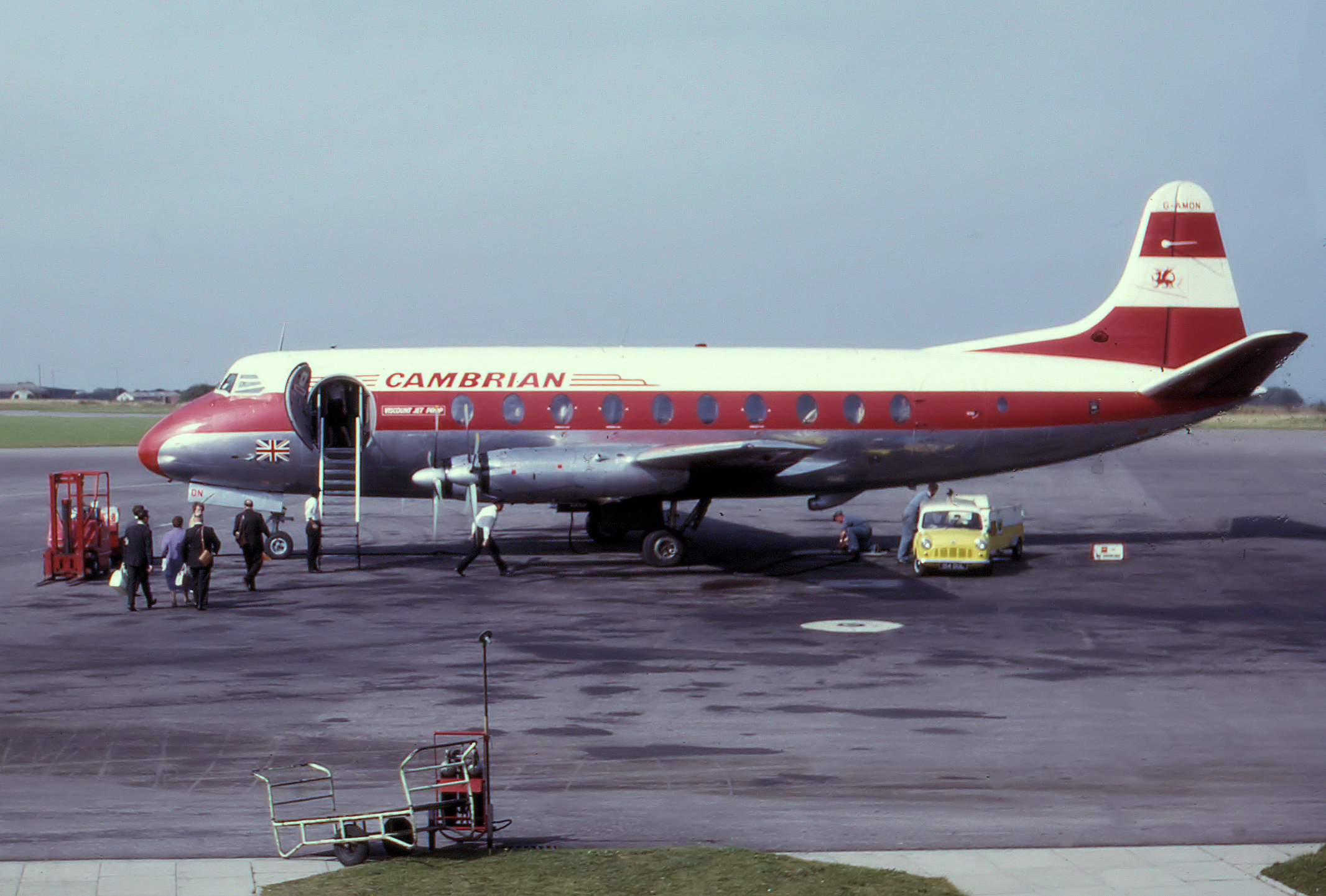
Viscount 701 loads at Bristol Airport in 1963

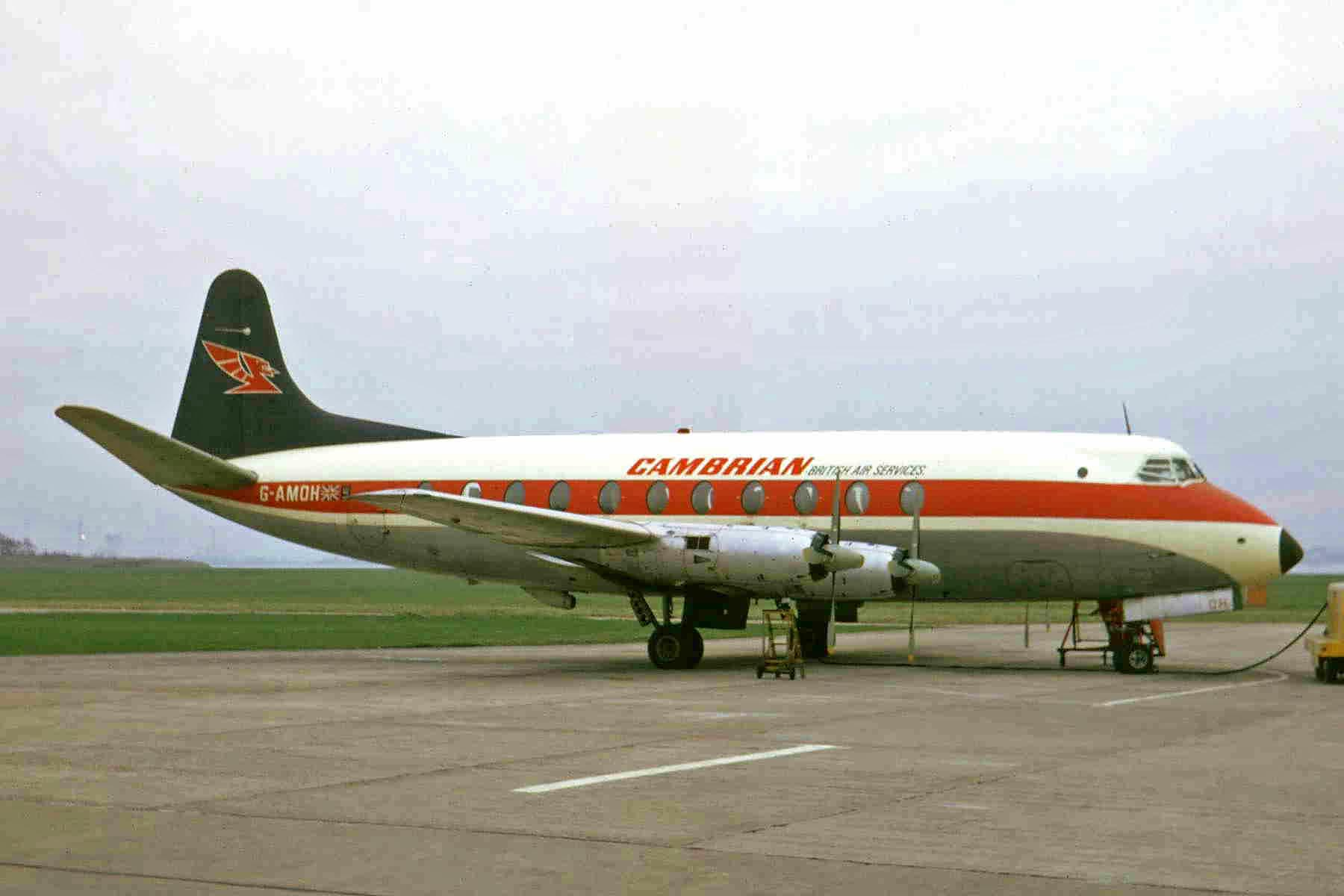
Viscount 701 in the revised livery (BAS)

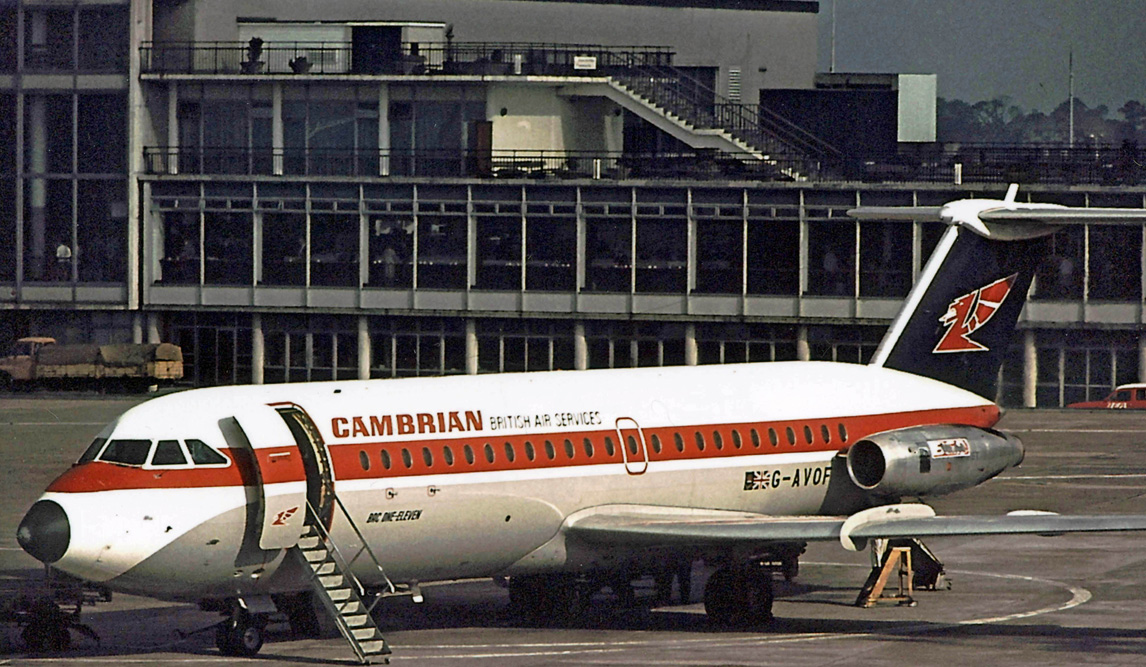
BAC One-Eleven with Cambrian/British Air Services titles at Manchester Airport in 1970

The Welsh air carrier was established on 25 April 1935 as Cambrian Air Services Ltd.. The airline's base was at Pengam Moors Airfield east of Cardiff. The first aircraft to be operated was a de Havilland DH.60 Moth, mainly to train pilots and fly tourists. With the outbreak of World War II, Cambrian stopped its activities on 3 September 1939.

Commencing on 1 January 1946 it was the first British airline to restart operations after the war, with a charter flight with an Auster Autocrat with a cargo of wire rope and an aircraft seat between Cardiff and Bristol. Starting in May 1948 Cambrian was flying in cooperation with BEA and used the de Havilland Dragon Rapide, the Autocrat and the Percival Proctor. One year later own flights began between Birmingham and Jersey. During 1953, Cambrian took over Olley Air Service and Murray Chown Aviation and began services between Southampton to Dinard and Paris. This route was served with the de Havilland Dove and later with the Douglas DC-3. On 23 May 1955 the corporate name changed to Cambrian Airways Ltd.

By 1961, Cambrian was operating eight ex-BEA Douglas DC-3s. Vickers Viscount turboprop entered service on 20 February 1963 from Cardiff via Bristol to Dublin. From 1964 the type was used on charter flights to Rimini, Palma, Nice, Valencia and Barcelona. In 1967 BEA took over Cambrian, although it continued operations as a separate airline. The following year the last DC-3 was flown. Cambrian also operated jet BAC One-Elevens, used for charter flights and on the scheduled network.

In late 1972 Cambrian became part of the new British Air Services coordinating entity and gradually lost its independence and brand. Firstly it was integrated into British Airways-Regional Division-Cambrian and later, on 1 April 1976, the Division became fully operational. The Cambrian livery was gradually replaced by an interim one with British Airways as the main name and Cambrian in small titles.

== Destinations in 1971 ==
According to its 1 November 1971 system timetable, Cambrian was serving the following destinations with scheduled passenger flights.

=== United Kingdom ===
- Belfast
- Bristol
- Bournemouth
- Cardiff
- Edinburgh
- Glasgow
- Guernsey
- Isle of Man
- Jersey
- Liverpool
- London - Heathrow Airport
- Manchester
- Southampton

=== Ireland ===
- Cork
- Dublin

=== France ===
- Paris - Le Bourget Airport

The 1971 timetable states the Cambrian fleet consisted of four BAC One-Eleven jets and eight Vickers Viscount turboprops (1972 fleet as well).

== Fleet ==
- 4 x British Aircraft Corporation BAC One-Eleven 400
- 9 x DH.89A de Havilland Dragon Rapide
- 5 x DH.104 de Havilland Dove
- 4 DH.114 de Havilland Heron
- 10 x Douglas DC-3
- 12 x Vickers Viscount 701
- 8 x Vickers Viscount 806X

== Accidents and incidents ==
- On 20 July 1965, Vickers Viscount G-AMOL crashed on landing at Speke Airport, Liverpool after a flight from Ronaldsway Airport, Isle of Man. Both crew were killed, as well as two persons on the ground.
- On 19 January 1970, Vickers Viscount G-AMOA was damaged beyond economic repair in a heavy landing at Lulsgate Airport, Bristol.

== See also ==
- List of defunct airlines of the United Kingdom
