= Fairwood Park Golf Course =

Golf course on the Gower Peninsula, Wales

Fairwood Park Golf Club

- Fairwood Park Golf Club within Wales
- 51.602682°N 4.042632°W

Club information
- Location: Gower, Wales
- Established: 1905
- Type: Golf Club
- Total holes: 18
- Website: http://www.fairwoodpark.com

Fairwood Park Golf Club is a golf club based on the Gower Peninsula, Wales. It is the only 'Championship' status golf course on the Gower Peninsula, having twice hosted the Welsh PGA Championships.

The clubhouse was previously a secret RAF Hospital during World War II.
