= Carmarthen Priory =

Former monastery and priory in Wales

Coordinates: 51°51′38″N 4°17′52″W

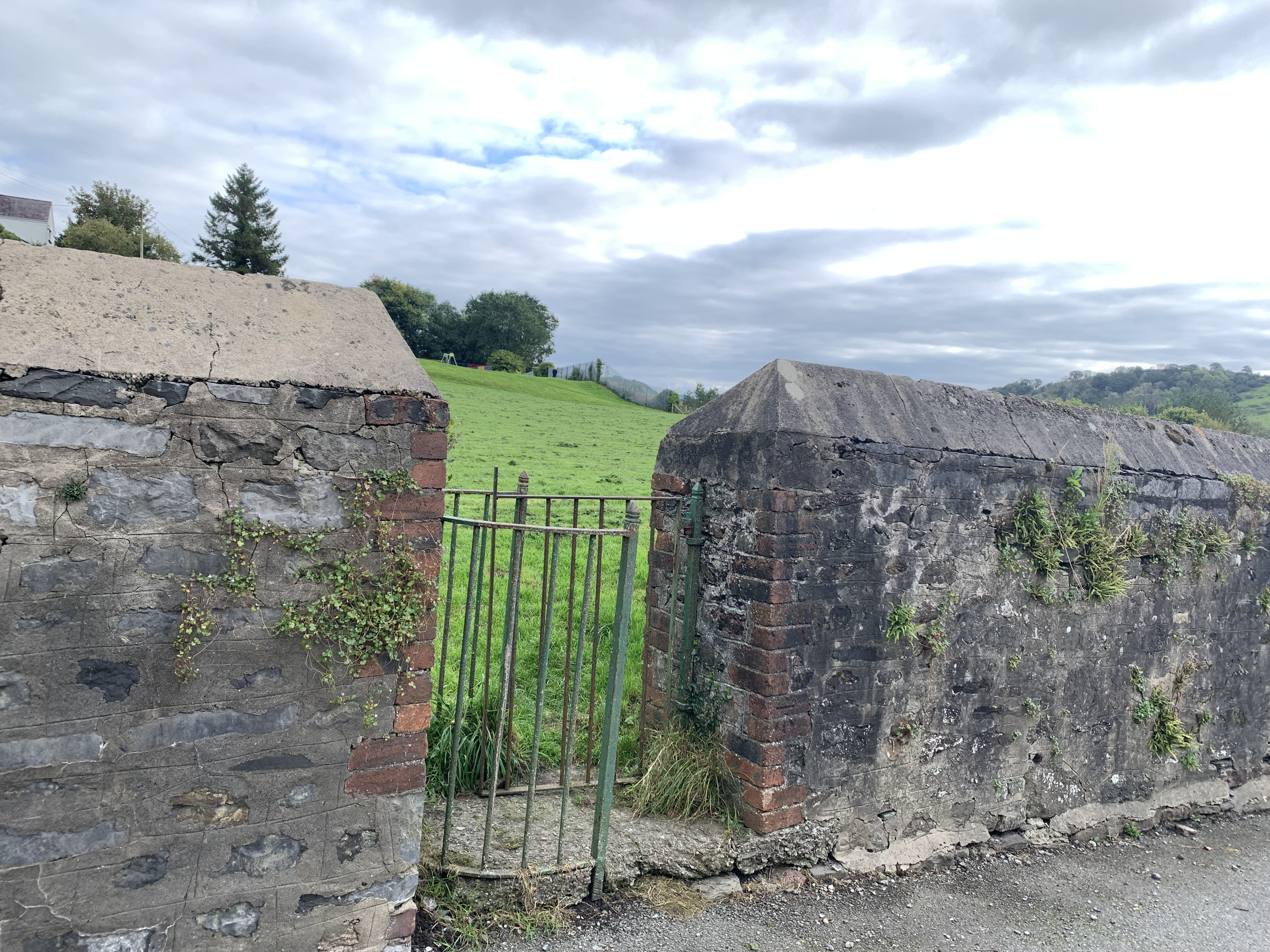

Religion
- Affiliation: Benedictine (prior to c. 1125); Augustinian (c. 1125–1537)

Location
- Location: Carmarthen, Wales
- Interactive map of Carmarthen Priory

Architecture
- Demolished: c. 1781

Carmarthen Priory (also known as St John's Priory or Priory of St John and St Teulyddog) was a religious site in Carmarthen, South Wales. It has now virtually disappeared. The Black Book of Carmarthen, an early Welsh-language text, is believed to have been created at the Priory.

== History ==
=== Celtic monastery ===
A Celtic monastic settlement existed at Carmarthen prior to the Norman Conquest. It was called Llandeulyddog and was the church of Saint Teulyddog. This is likely the same church as Llan Teulydawc, one of the Seven Bishop-Houses of the Kingdom of Dyfed, and may date back to the 6th century.

=== Benedictine monastery ===
Following the establishment of a royal castle at Carmarthen in 1109, the newly built St Peter's Church and the older church at Llandeulyddog were placed under the jurisdiction of Battle Abbey by Henry I. A Benedictine monastery was established on the site in c. 1110.

=== Augustinian priory ===
In 1125, ownership reverted to Bishop Bernard of St Davids, who established an Augustinian priory on the site dedicated to St John the Evangelist and the Celtic saint Teulyddog.

In 1208, William de Londres (a Norman lord and one of the Twelve Knights of Glamorgan) attempted to take over the Priory. He replaced the canons with those of Llanthony Secunda, but they were later removed.

In 1403, the Priory was looted during the Owain Glyndŵr rebellion.

Poets were often welcomed to stay at the Priory, with Lewys Glyn Cothi praising the Priory. The Eisteddfod of 1450 was likely hosted at the site.

In 1534, Prior Griffin Williams acknowledged the Act of Supremacy and, on 17 February 1537, the Priory was dissolved during the dissolution of the monasteries. At the time, it housed twelve canons and about eighty people.

=== Post-Dissolution ===
After the Priory was dissolved, a mansion was built within the buildings, and the site became a private house, but, by 1748, it was in ruins.

One of the buildings was used as a poorhouse from 1758, before the building of Carmathen Workhouse.

The ruins were destroyed around 1781 by Lord Cawdor to make way for a lead smelting works. The leadworks were later demolished, and the site was further demolished in 1855–1860 for the railway.

== The Black Book of Carmarthen ==
In c. 1250, Llyfr Du Caerfyrddin (English: Black Book of Carmarthen) was transcribed in the scriptorium at the priory. It is the earliest complete manuscript in the Welsh language, being a combination of transcriptions of older manuscripts and original works produced at the time and transcribed by an individual monk. It survived the dissolution of the monasteries and is now held at the National Library of Wales.

== Modern day ==
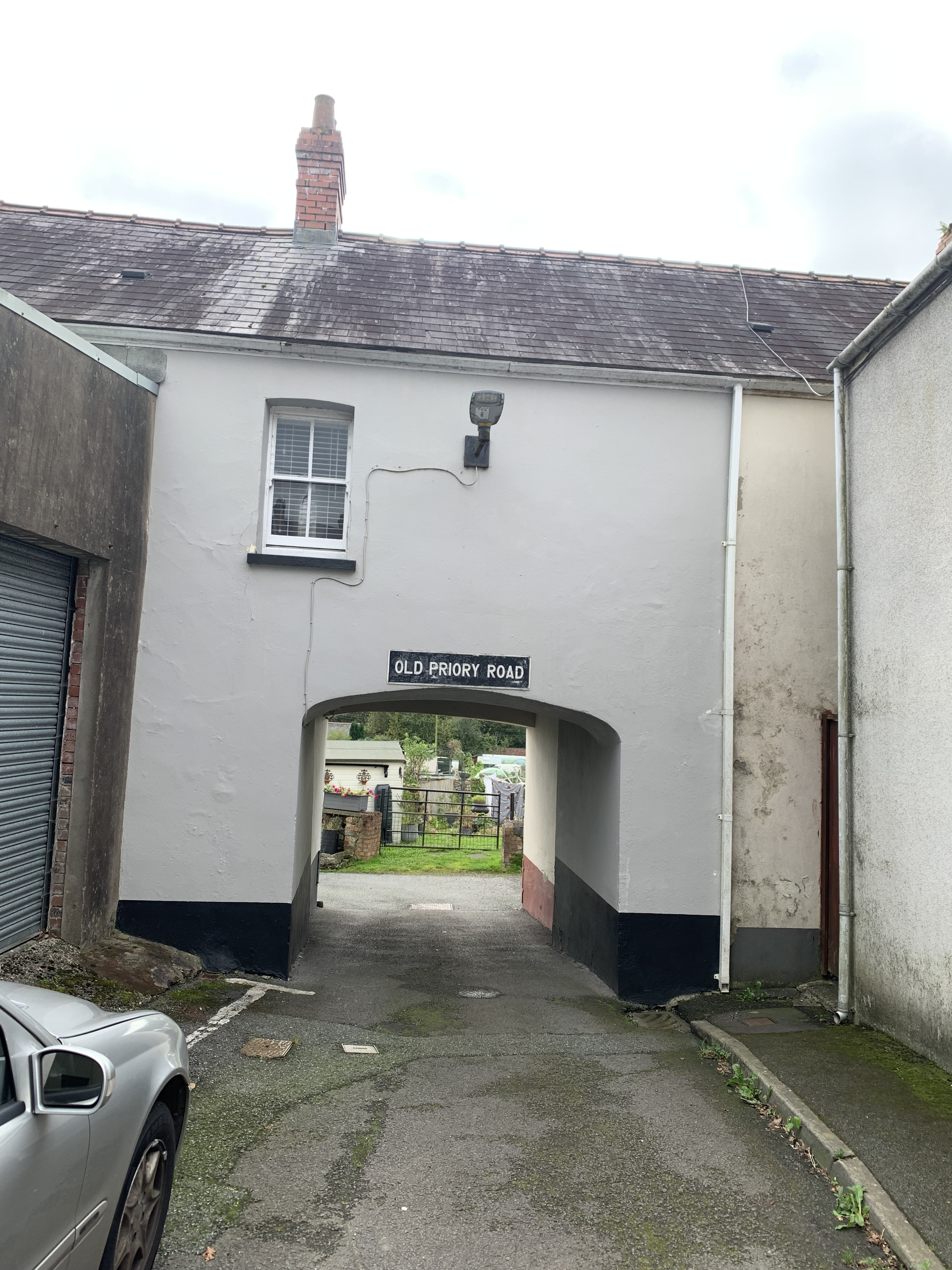
The surviving building on the site of the gateway to the Priory

Nothing remains of the Benedictine priory, and what little remains is from the Augustinian priory, or later.

Most of the site was demolished in the late-18th and mid-19th centuries, but a row of terraced houses with an archway is still standing which includes fabric from the Priory gatehouse. The gatehouse dates from the late-15th or early-16th century.

The site of the former Priory is protected as a scheduled monument. Some parts of the former Priory have been located through excavation.

The north-west wall of Parc Hinds, a recreational park established on the former Priory grounds, follows the line of the former Priory wall. It was excavated in 1979.
