= John Bodvan Anwyl =

English-born Welsh minister (1875–1949)

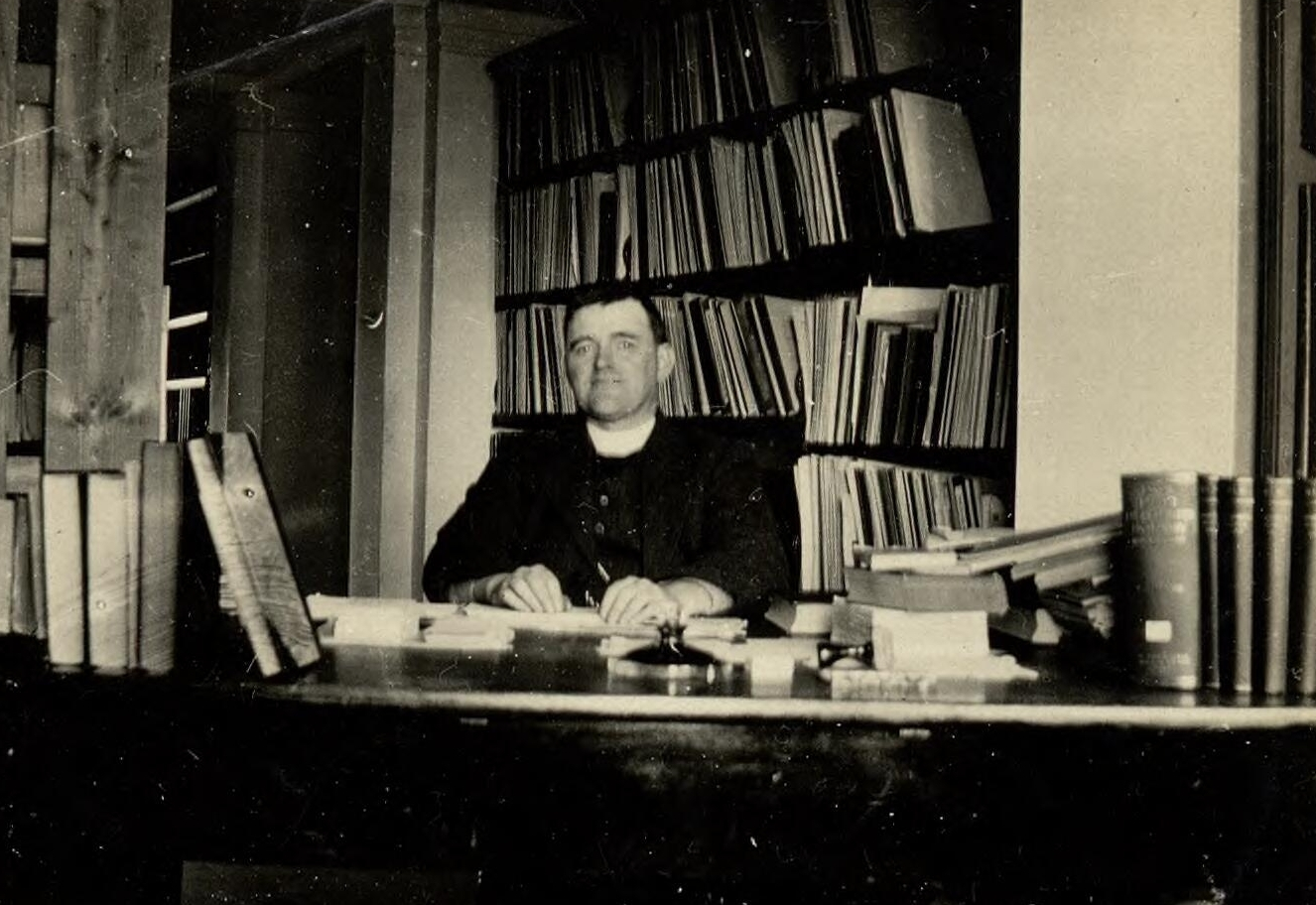
Anwyl, c. 1900

John Bodvan Anwyl (27 June 1875 – 23 July 1949), also known as J. Bodvan Anwyl, was an English-born Welsh Congregational minister, lexicographer, editor, translator, and author.

== Early life ==
Anwyl was born in Chester, England on 27 June 1875. His parents were Ellen (née Williams) and John Anwyl, who was a lay preacher and whose family was from Caerwys, Flintshire. His mother's family was from the Llangwnnadl area. His older brother was Sir Edward Anwyl.

== Career ==
In 1899, he became a Congregationalist minister of the Elim Welsh Independent Church, Carmarthen. Having struggled with deafness, in 1904 he accepted a position in Pontypridd to manage the Glamorgan Mission to the Deaf and Dumb, which he held for fifteen years. Anwyl then worked for two years for the National Library of Wales. The Board of Celtic Studies of the University of Wales led a project for a Welsh dictionary, for which he was appointed secretary in 1921.

He wrote newspaper articles and books, translated books, and was an editor of Spurrell's Welsh-English Dictionary (1914) and Spurrell's English-Welsh Dictionary (1916). (Note: His brother, Edward, assisted him on the dictionaries.) He translated books by the London Missionary Society into Welsh. He wrote Y Pulpud Bach (The Pulpit Small, 1924), Fy Hanes i fy Hunan (My Memoir, 1933), Englynion (1933), and Yr Arian Mawr (The Big Money, 1934).

He retired to Llangwnnadl in 1935. Anwyl drowned on 23 July 1949 and was buried in the churchyard at Penllech, Gwynedd. His papers are archived at the National Library of Wales.
