= Carmarthen Cemetery Chapel =

Church in Carmarthenshire, Wales

Coordinates: 51.8638°N 4.3199°W

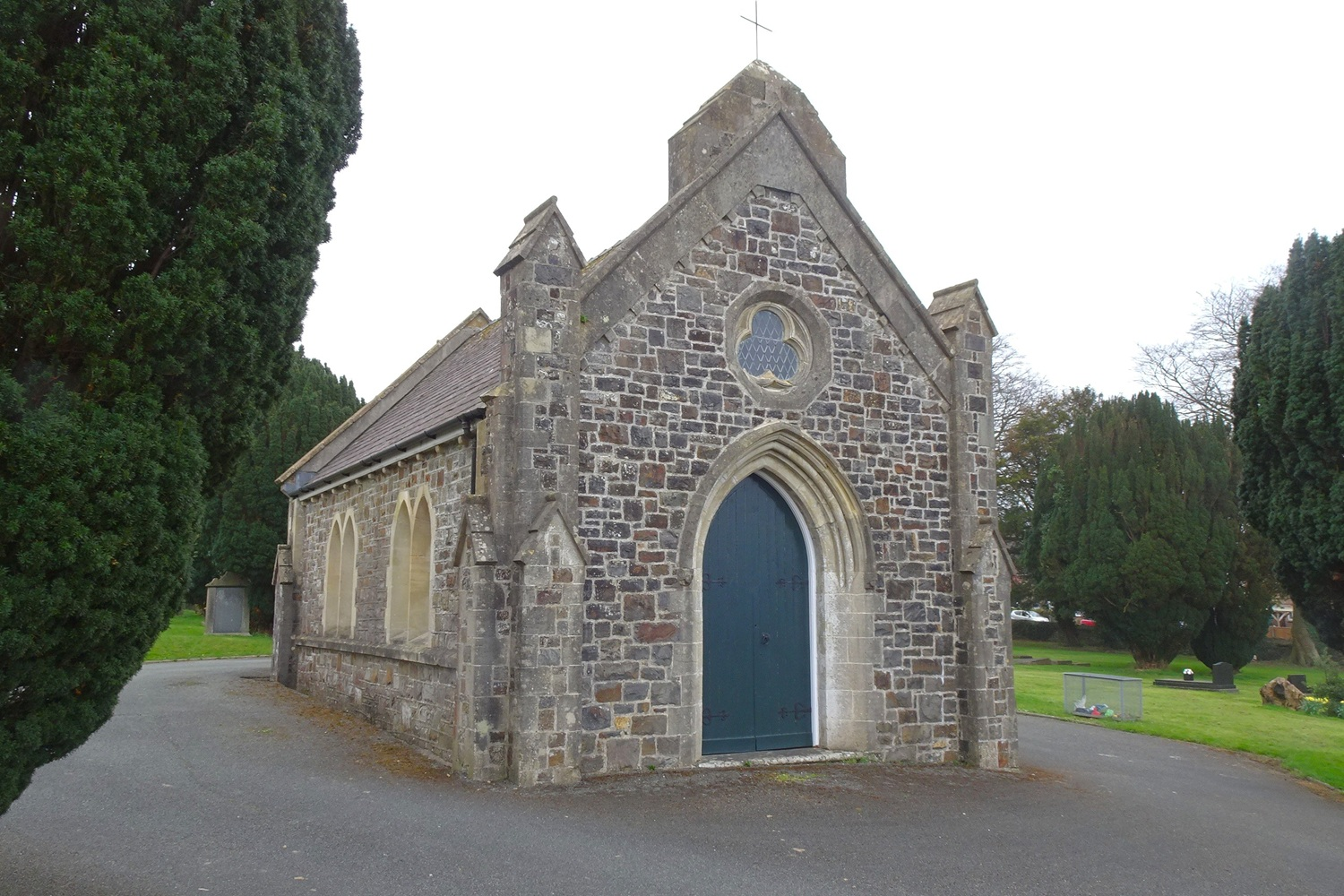
- Carmarthen Cemetery Chapel
- Location: 6, Russell Terrace, Carmarthen
- Country: Wales
- Denomination: Cemetery chapel

History
- Founded: 1855

Architecture
- Heritage designation: Grade II
- Designated: 19 May 1981
- Architectural type: Chapel
- Style: Mid 19th century

Carmarthen Cemetery Chapel is a cemetery chapel in the town of Carmarthen, Carmarthenshire, Wales. The building dates from 1855 and is located at 6, Russell Terrace, Carmarthen.

It was proposed in 1853 that two chapels should be built for the cemetery in Russell Terrace, Carmarthen, one for the burial of Anglicans and the other for Nonconformists. Tenders were received from three persons, James Wilson, R.K. Penson and W.W. Jenkins. At first Penson's bid was chosen, but after reconsideration, it was rejected and Jenkins received the contract. The two chapels were built as well as walls and entrance gates. Each chapel building was built of rubble stone, with ashlar dressings, and gabled roofs of slate and simple interiors. Bishop Thirlwall performed the opening ceremony in 1856, and afterwards the churchyard of St Peter's Church was closed to new burials. Since then, one of the chapels has been demolished, and the entrance gates have also gone.

The chapel was designated as a Grade II listed building on 19 May 1981, being an example of a fine "mid C19 cemetery chapel in Gothic style".
