= Eglwys Sant Ioan, Carmarthen =

Church in Carmarthenshire, Wales

Coordinates: 51.8595°N 4.3000°W

Eglwys Sant Ioan
- St John's Church (English)
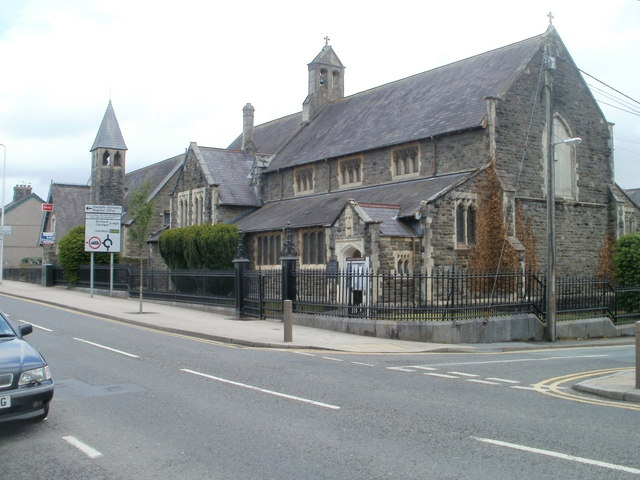
- Eglwys Sant Ioan
- Location: Penuel Street, Carmarthen
- Country: Wales
- Denomination: Anglican

History
- Founded: 1889

Architecture
- Heritage designation: Grade II
- Designated: 19 May 1981
- Architectural type: Church
- Style: Victorian

Eglwys Sant Ioan, or St John's Church, is an Anglican church in the town of Carmarthen, Carmarthenshire, Wales. It was built in 1889–1890 as the Welsh language church for the parish of St Peter. It is located in Penuel Street.

The architects for the building of Eglwys Sant Ioan were Middleton, Prothero & Phillot of Cheltenham. A. G. Edwards, Bishop of St. Asaph and former vicar of St Peter's, Carmarthen, laid the foundation stone on 25 June 1889 and Thomas Collins of Tewkesbury undertook the building work. The original estimate was for a total amount of around £2000 but the costs overran, and the final sum spent was £3041. The building was opened on 15 June 1890 by the Bishop of St. Davids.

The church was designated as a Grade II listed building on 19 May 1981, being "a well-designed late Victorian smaller town church". The railings, gates and gate piers are separately Grade II listed and were made in 1893 by T. Jones and Sons of the Priory foundry of Carmarthen.
