= Carmarthen Castle =

Castle in Carmarthen, Wales

Coordinates: 51.855°N 4.306°W

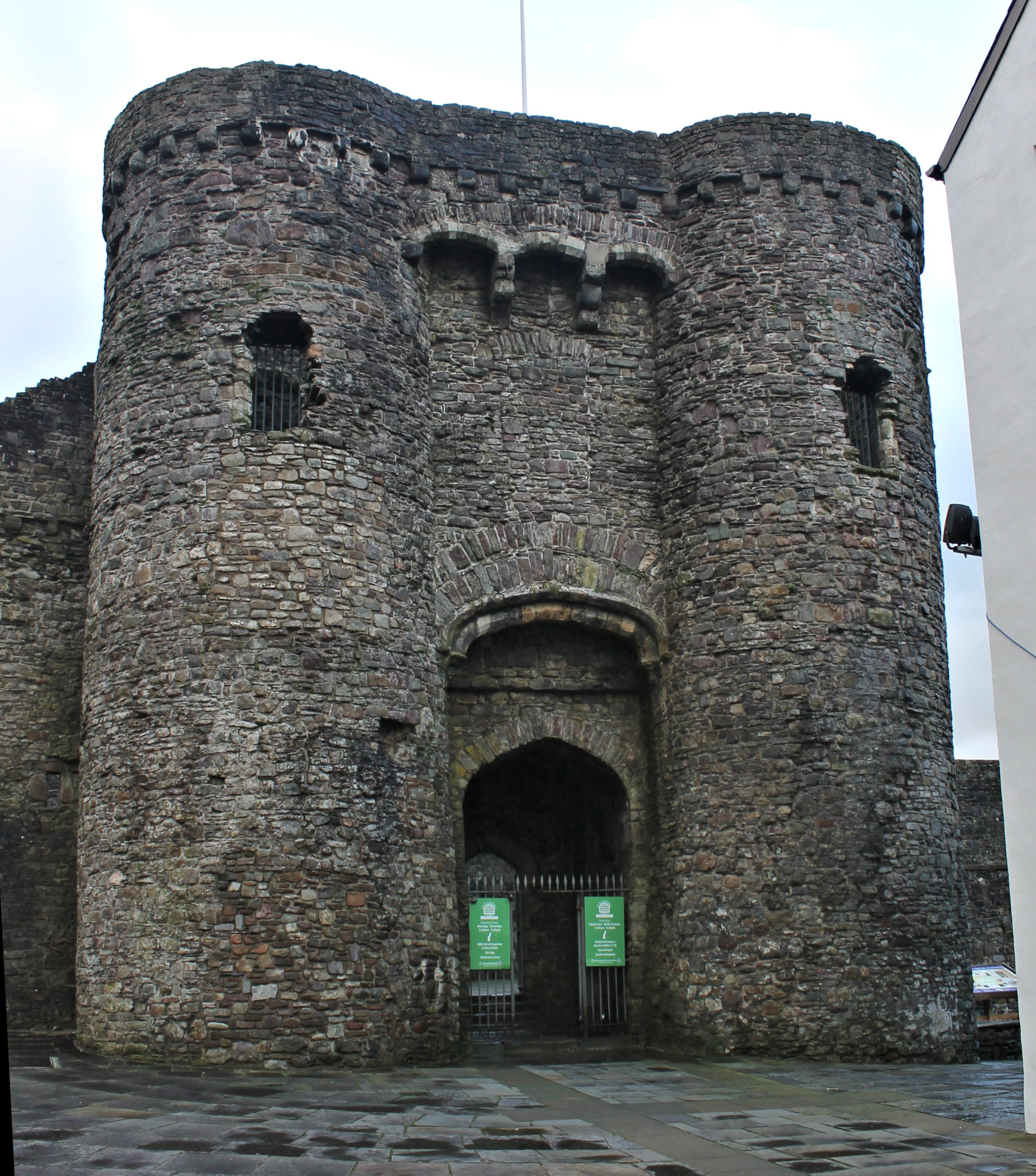

Site information
- Condition: Ruins

Site history
- Battles/wars: Captured by Gruffydd ap Rhys (1116) Captured by Cadell ap Gruffydd (1146); Destroyed by Rhys ap Gruffydd (1195); Captured by Llywelyn the Great (1215); Captured by the Earl of Pembroke (1223); Captured by Owain Glyndŵr (1405); Captured by William Herbert of Raglan (1456); Captured by Colonel Laugharne (1640s)

Listed Building
- Type: Grade I listed
- Designated: 1954

Carmarthen Castle (Welsh: Castell Caerfyrddin) is a ruined castle in Carmarthen, West Wales, UK. First built by Walter, Sheriff of Gloucester in the early 1100s, the castle was captured and destroyed on several occasions before being rebuilt in stone during the 1190s. The castle was captured by Owain Glyndŵr in 1405. Henry VII's father died at Carmarthen Castle in 1456. During the Wars of the Roses the castle fell to William Herbert and, during the Civil War, was captured by Parliamentary forces. It was ‘slighted’ (dismantled) by order of Oliver Cromwell in the mid 1600s.

It has been used as the site of Carmarthen's jail until the 1920s. The remains of the castle were given a Grade I heritage listing in 1954 and is currently a tourist attraction and site of the town's Tourist Information Centre.

== Location ==
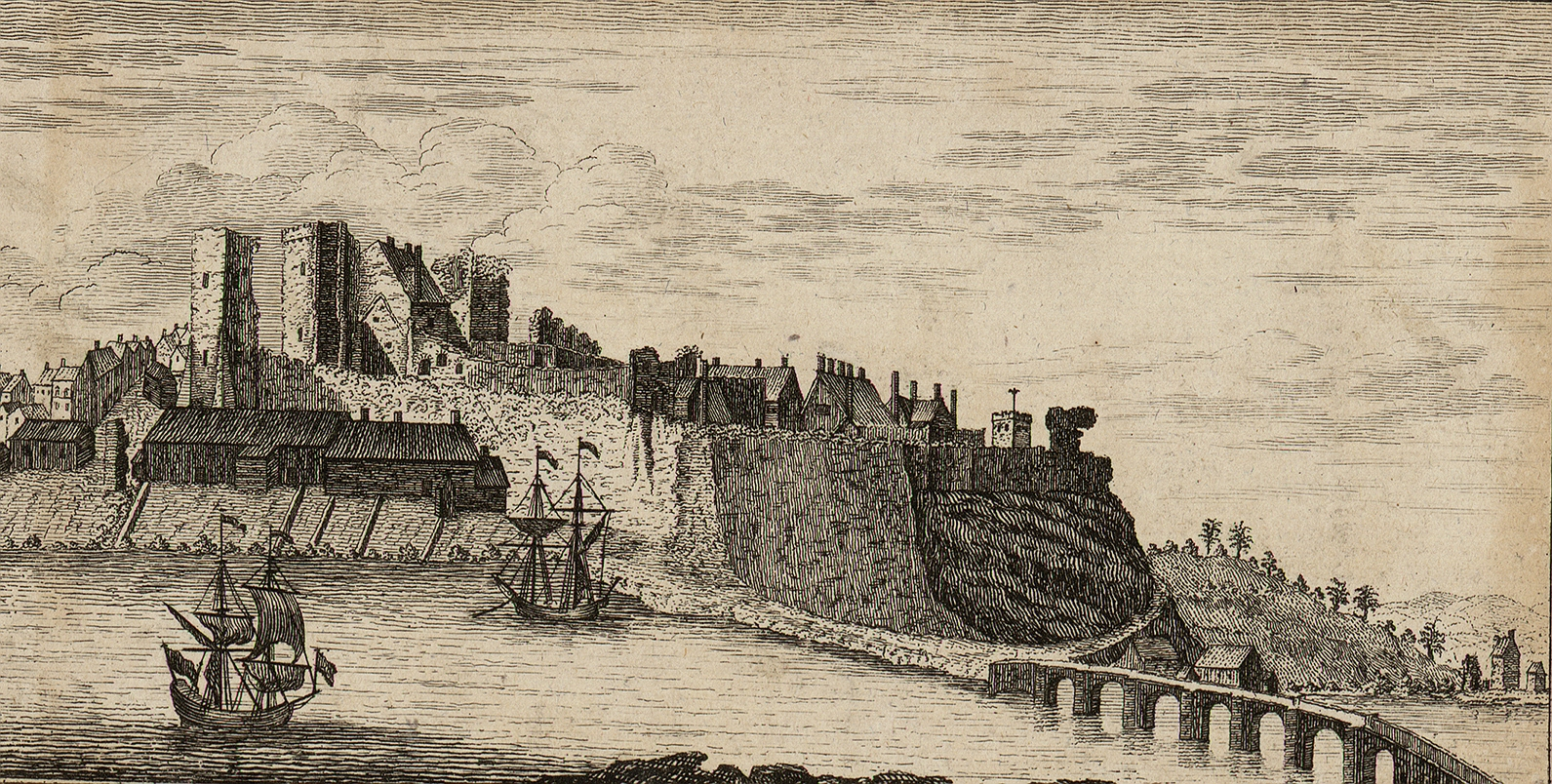
Carmarthen Castle and River Towy, a print by Thomas Pennant (1781)

The castle is in the county town of Carmarthen located 20 metres (66 ft) above sea level on a high terrace overlooking the tidal River Towy. Carmarthen Bridge lies below the castle, at what was the lowest bridging point of the river 11 miles (18 km) from the sea. While it is described today as "arguably the biggest disappointment among the plethora of medieval ruins in Wales" it has, in fact, dominated the layout and orientation of the town with its streets and property boundaries coming out from the site.

It is accessed today via the surviving 13-metre-high (43 ft) gatehouse on Nott Square or alternatively via the Old Castle Gaol entrance on Gaol Hill/Castle Hill.

== History ==
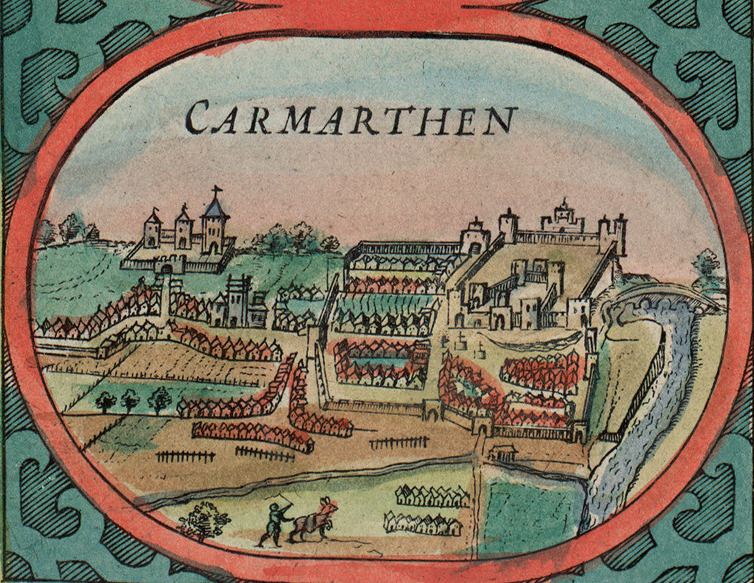
Carmarthen and the castle, 1610

=== The first castle ===
The first castle on its current site at Carmarthen is variously dated to 1104, circa 1106 or 1109 and ascribed to Walter of Gloucester, though Ludlow suggests it is more likely that the castle had already been built when Walter was recorded (in 1109) as being sent to defend Carmarthen. An earlier fort existed 1.4 kilometres (0.87 mi) south at Rhyd-y-gors, built by William FitzBaldwin of Devon on behalf of English King William II, probably after the death of the local Welsh King Rhys ap Tewdwr in 1093. It was last mentioned in 1106. Pembroke Castle had been established in 1102.

The castle, originally a timber motte and bailey structure, is believed to have been rebuilt in stone in the later years of the 1100s.

=== 12th century ===
It was not too long before local Welsh prince Gruffydd ap Rhys (who had had his lands taken from him by the Normans) attacked Carmarthen Castle. Around 1116 he successfully captured it in a night attack, despite the Normans arranging for it to be defended in a two weekly rotation by local chieftains. Gruffydd dismantled the castle and plundered the surrounding town. Subsequently rebuilt, the castle changed hands several times over the following decades. The North Wales prince, Owain Gwynedd ('Owain the Great'), destroyed the castle in 1137 and it was again destroyed in 1143. Briefly recaptured in 1144, it was again taken by Cadell (the son of Gruffydd ap Rhys) in 1146 and retained for several years. Cadell's brother Rhys again captured (and destroyed) the castle in 1195.

=== Wars of the Roses ===
Carmarthen Castle is noted as the place of death of Edmund Tudor, father of the first Tudor king of England, Henry VII. Edmund took possession of the castle during the Wars of the Roses on behalf of the House of Lancaster. Opposing Yorkist troops led by William Herbert captured the castle in August 1456, imprisoning Edmund Tudor, who died a prisoner there on 1 November. His 13-year old wife Lady Margaret Beaufort gave birth to Henry in January the following year.

=== The Old Gaol ===
An eight cell jail existed in the inner bailey at Carmarthen Castle and, in 1789, this was converted into a new County Gaol, designed by architect John Nash. The jail was extended in 1869 and survived until it was demolished in 1936.

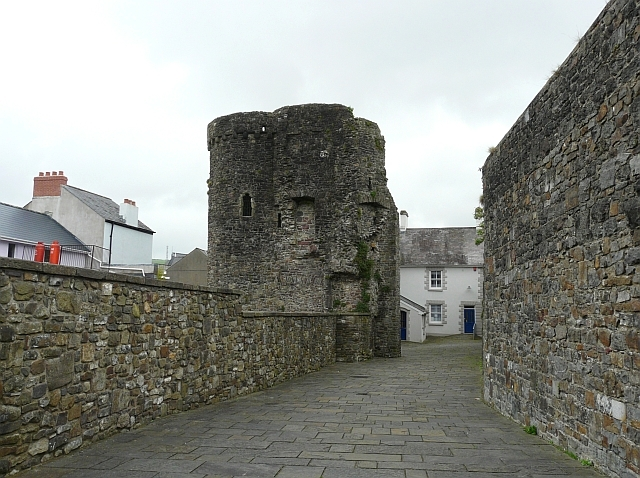
Old Police Station (Castle House) inside the castle walls

In about 1860 a two-storey police station and lock-up was built between the outer and inner walls of the castle. It was used as a place to hold prisoners in transit to the nearby courthouse. The building was used as such until 1947 (and now known as Castle House).

=== 20th and 21st centuries ===
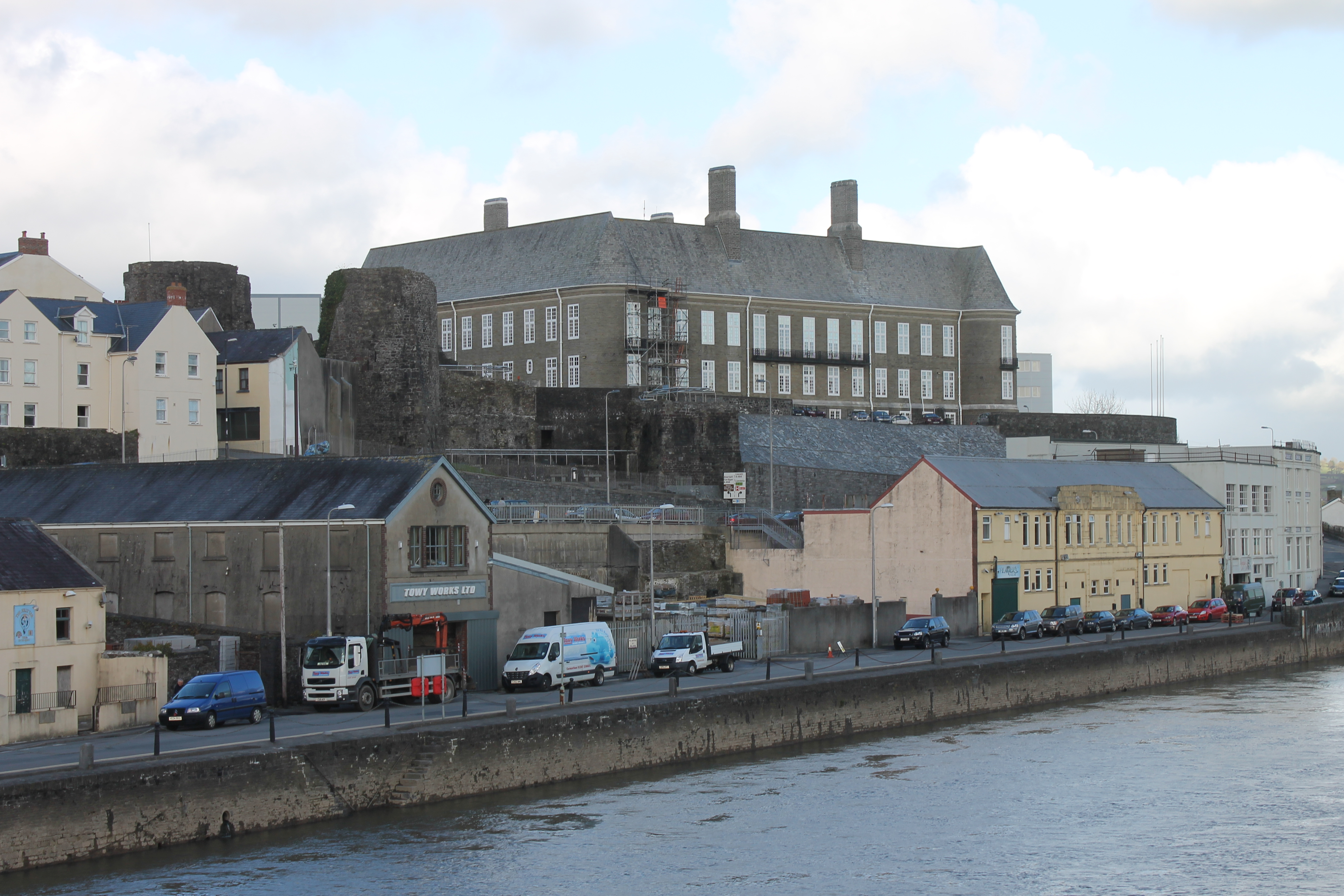
The remains of the castle today, dominated by the 1930s County Hall

With no further use as a prison, Carmarthenshire Council bought the Old Gaol in 1925, intending to build the new County Hall and a museum on the site. Carmarthenshire Council's new "chateau" style County Hall was completed in 1938.

The remains of Carmarthen Castle have been a Grade I heritage listed since 1954, as "substantial remains of a major medieval castle".

Around the turn of the 21st century parts of the castle, the Square Tower and Southwest Tower, were made accessible following a detailed archaeological investigation. A number of surrounding buildings were removed to improve the visibility of the castle. The upper levels of the gatehouse and shell keep were opened to the public (with full access around the ground level) for the first time in 2003. A grass area with benches (and views over the town's rooftops) was created at the top of the keep's mound.

Castle House, within the remaining castle walls is used as a museum and the town's Tourist Information Centre.

== Name ==
The name of the castle is pleonastic: In its Welsh form, Castell Caerfyrddin, "Caer" means fort, while "fyrddin" is thought to be derived from the Latin Moridunum ("sea fort" ) making Carmarthen Castle " fort sea-fort castle".

== See also ==
- Grade I listed buildings in Carmarthenshire

== Sources ==
- Amin, Nathen (2014), "Carmarthen Castle", Tudor Wales, Amberley Publishing, pp. 25–26, ISBN 978-1-4456-1773-2
- Ludlow, Neil (2014), Carmarthen Castle: The Archaeology of Government, University of Wales Press, ISBN 978-1-7831-6013-6
