= English Congregational Church, Carmarthen =

Church in Carmarthenshire, Wales

Coordinates: 51.8567°N 4.3127°W

English Congregational Church
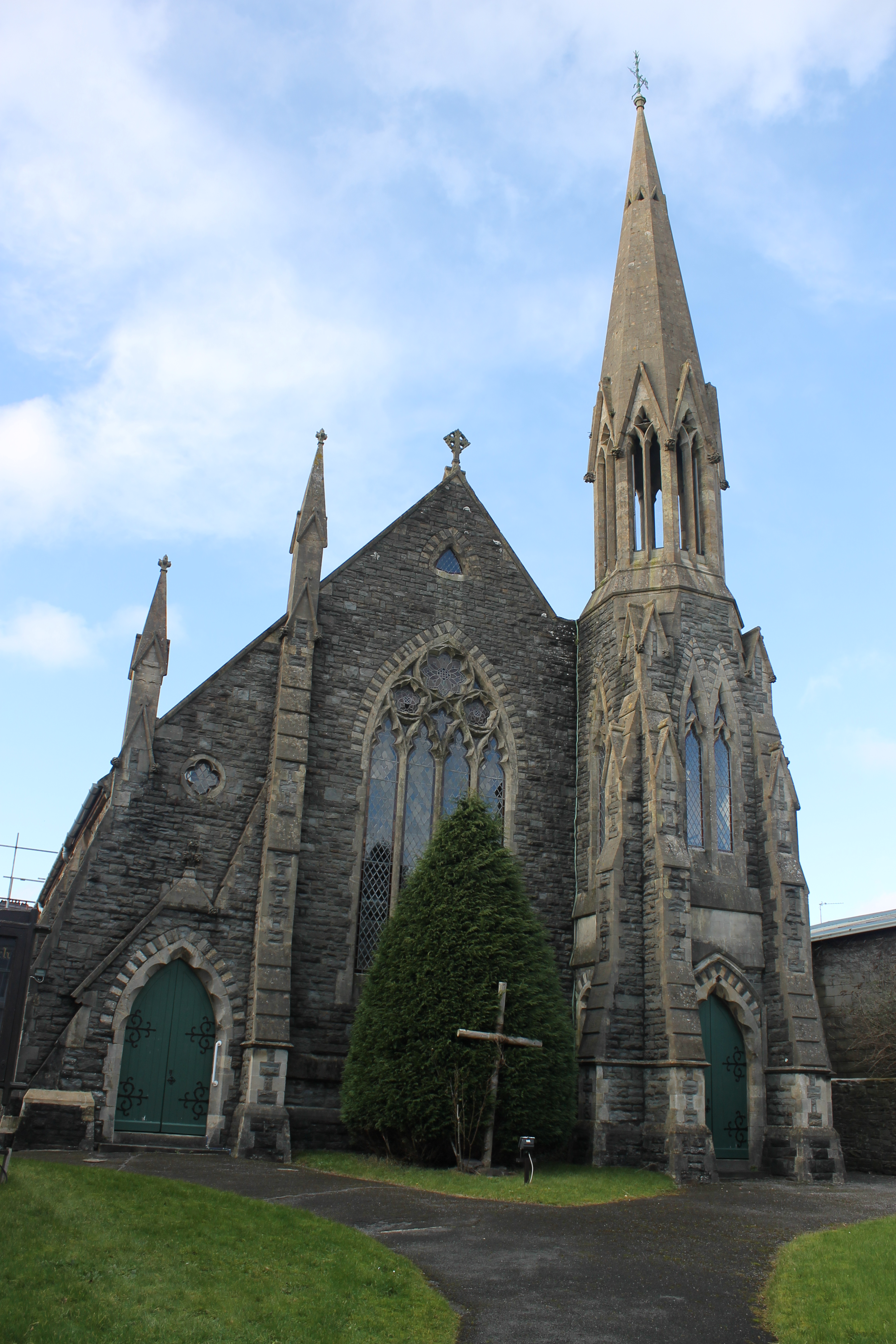
- The church in 2014
- English Congregational Church
- Location: 105, Lammas St, Carmarthen
- Country: Wales
- Denomination: Congregational church

Architecture
- Heritage designation: Grade II
- Designated: 19 May 1981
- Architectural type: Chapel
- Style: Gothic style

The English Congregational Church, Carmarthen is a Congregational church in the town of Carmarthen, Carmarthenshire, Wales. The building dates from 1861 and is located at 105, Lammas St, Carmarthen. The church was designated as a Grade II listed building on 19 May 1981.

The English Congregational Church in Carmarthen was built in 1861 by Poulton and Woodman, an experienced firm of chapel builders. It is similar to the Presbyterian church they built in Brecon in 1872. The English Congregational Church is rendered more conspicuous by being set at an angle to the street. It is built of rock-faced stone with Bath stone features and is in an exaggeratedly Gothic style. There are a lot of strange angles and junctions, a steep gable end with a tall window, a tower with spiral stair and a slender spire on an open bell platform. There are other strange features and by contrast, the interior is quite plain, with arch-braced roof trusses, and an organ recess with a pointed apse. The pulpit is polygonal and the single gallery has a front made from diagonally arranged boarding.

The church was designated as a Grade II listed building on 19 May 1981, being "a remarkably confident example of Gothic chapel architecture". The Royal Commission on the Ancient and Historical Monuments of Wales curates the archaeological, architectural and historic records for this church. These include digital photographs and colour transparencies of the exterior and interior of the building.
