= Elim Independent Chapel, Carmarthen =

Church in Carmarthenshire, Wales

Coordinates: 51.8706°N 4.3211°W

Elim Independent Chapel
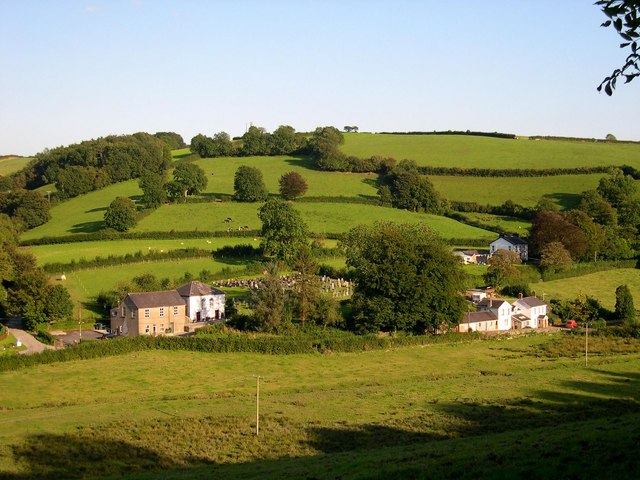
- Elim Chapel and Brodirion Ffynnon-ddrain from Castell Howell hill
- Elim Independent Chapel
- Location: Carmarthen
- Country: Wales
- Denomination: Independent chapel

History
- Founded: 1849

Architecture
- Heritage designation: Grade II
- Designated: 19 May 1981
- Architectural type: Chapel
- Style: Mid 19th century

Elim Independent Chapel is an independent chapel in the town of Carmarthen, Carmarthenshire, Wales. The building dates from 1849 and is located about one mile north of Lime Grove House, Carmarthen. The chapel was designated a Grade II listed building on 19 May 1981.

== The chapel ==
Elim Independent Chapel was built by Morgan in 1849 and is in a rural position about one mile north of Carmarthen. The facade has five bays, the central three being under a portico and the two outermost each having a full cornice that matches the portico. Although built in the classical style, the robust Bath stone columns are too widely spaced as compared to other buildings, and the arches behind them look somewhat out of place. Morgan has built other chapels with temple fronts at Mount Pleasant, Swansea and Newtown, Montgomeryshire. These are better proportioned and more ample. The interior of Elim Independent Chapel is quite plain with a timbered and plastered ceiling. There is a gallery at the rear with pierced, cast iron panels and an organ arch below Corinthian pilasters.

The chapel was designated as a Grade II listed building on 19 May 1981, being an example of a fine "mid C19 hipped-roof chapel in a rural setting, with 1887 interior". The Royal Commission on the Ancient and Historical Monuments of Wales curates the archaeological, architectural and historic records for this chapel. These include colour photographs.
