= Carmarthen Bridge =

Bridge in Carmarthen, Wales

Coordinates: 51.8547°N 4.3045°W

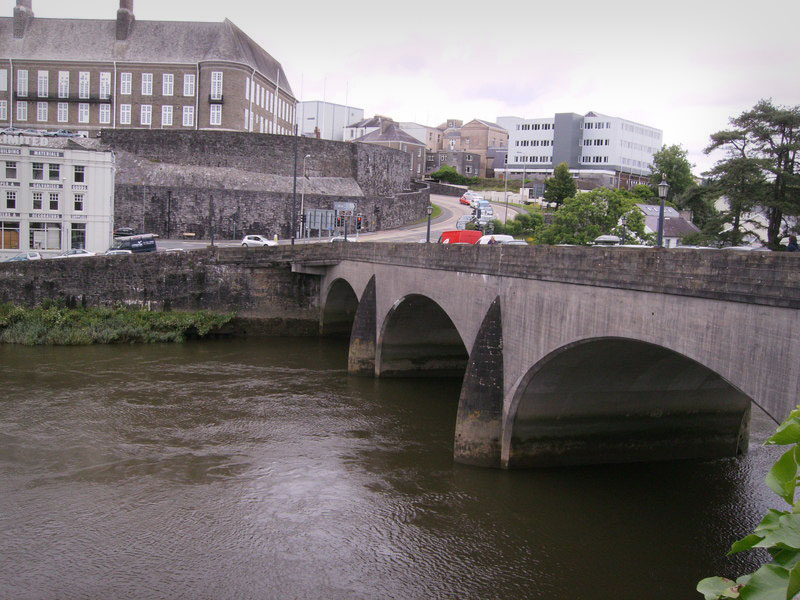
The 20th-century bridge

Carmarthen Bridge (also known locally as the Towy Bridge or Town Bridge) is the modern 1930s road bridge crossing the River Tywi in Carmarthen, Wales, carrying the A484 road.

== Early history ==
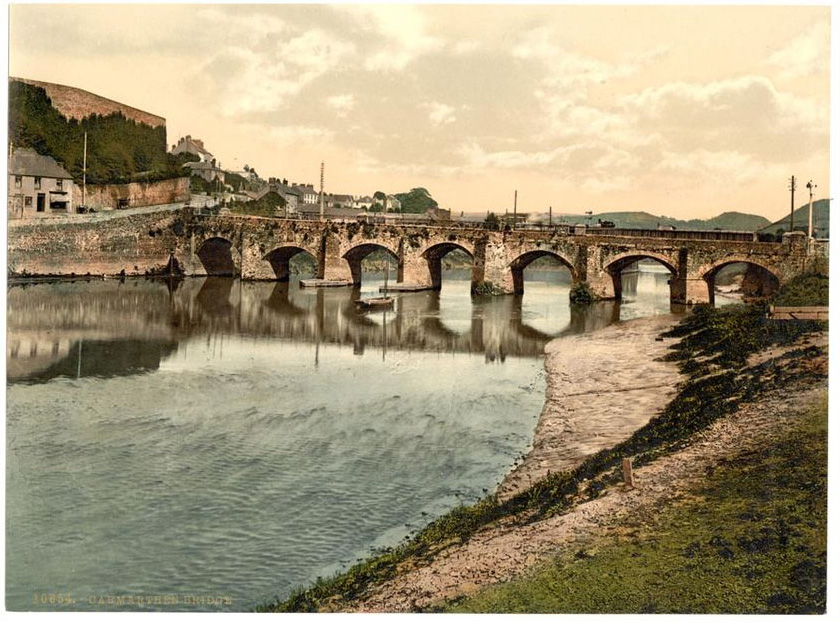
Carmarthen's medieval bridge

A stone bridge crossing the River Tywi at Carmarthen, nine miles from the river's mouth at the Bristol Channel, was first recorded in 1233. There was definitely no bridge at Carmarthen in 1188 when Giraldus Cambrensis visited. It is believed that a bridge was built during the 1233 siege of Carmarthen. By 1326 the bridge had clearly become unusable, as it had been replaced by a boat service, and King Edward II allowed the collection of money from ferryboat men to fund a replacement crossing. The town's priory was still raising money for a replacement bridge in 1362. Therefore, the bridge was repaired after this date. It was repaired and widened several times, in 1777 and 1834. The old bridge had seven arches and was recorded in 1849 as having an iron balustrade. The arches were divided by pointed cutwaters. The old bridge was demolished in 1936 to make way for a modern replacement.

== 20th century ==
The current road bridge is a three-arch concrete structure designed in 1933 by the architect Clough Williams-Ellis (best known for designing the village of Portmeirion). Construction of the new bridge began in May 1936. Completed at a cost of £89,091, it came into public use in September 1937. It was officially opened by the Minister of Transport, Leslie Burgin, in April 1938.

The Williams-Ellis bridge has curved grey sandstone cutwaters between each arch. The parapets are built up with layers of sandstone ashlar, alternating in thickness. There are Georgian style octagonal lamps attached to the parapets above each arch. The parapets continue some distance beyond the ends of the bridge, for example the southwest parapet curving down Station Approach towards the nearby Carmarthen Railway Station.

The bridge was Grade II listed in 2003, being an early 20th-century concrete bridge designed by an important Welsh architect.
