= Teulyddog =

Medieval Welsh saint

Saint Teulyddog
- Patronage: Carmarthen

Saint Teulyddog (Old Welsh: Teulydawc; Medieval Latin: Toulidauc and Thelaucus) was a medieval Welsh saint.

Accounted a disciple of Saint Dubricius, Teulyddog is said to have fled with many others to Brittany during the Yellow Plague of Rhos (y Fad Felen) in the 540s. Returning to Wales, he associated himself with Saint Teilo and was credited with the establishment of the clas (ecclesiastical settlement) in Carmarthen, which took its medieval name, Llan Teulyddog, in his honor. Following the Norman invasion of Wales, his patronage of the town was assumed by John the Evangelist, though the dedication of the Benedictine Abbey (later an Augustinian priory) remained under the joint dedication of Teulyddog and St John.
