= Carmarthen =

County town of Carmarthenshire, Wales

Carmarthen: Welsh: Caerfyrddin
- Town
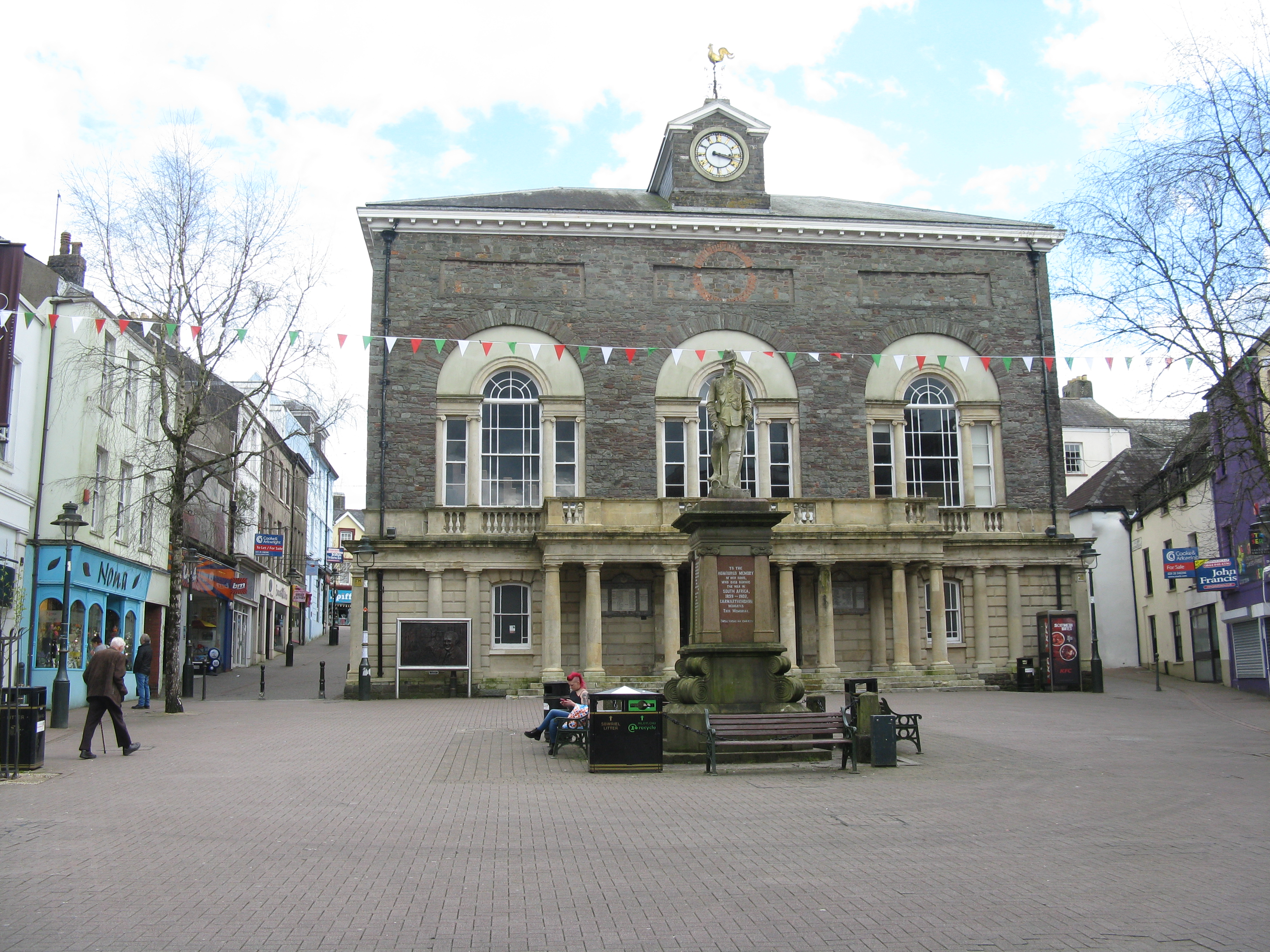
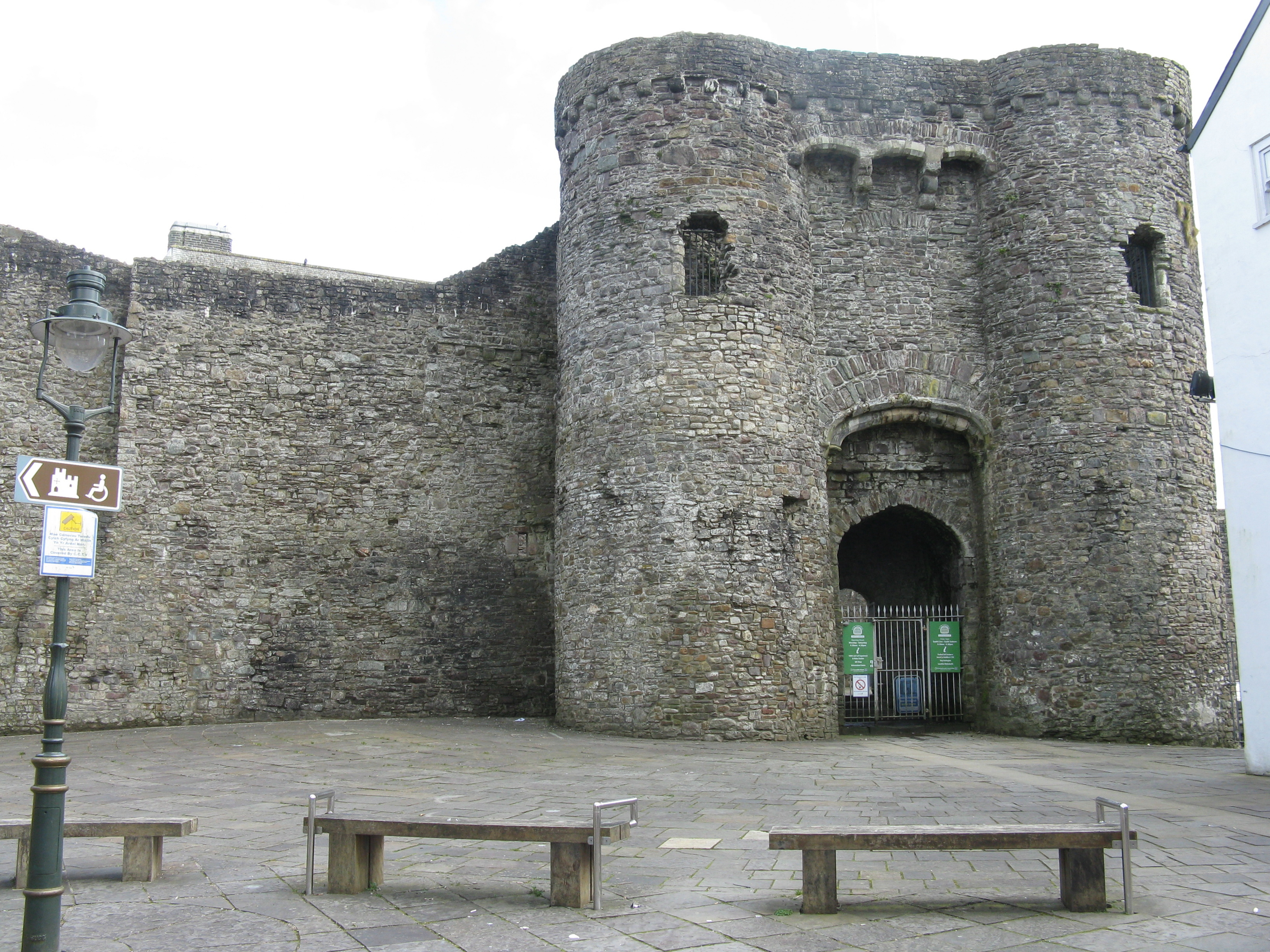
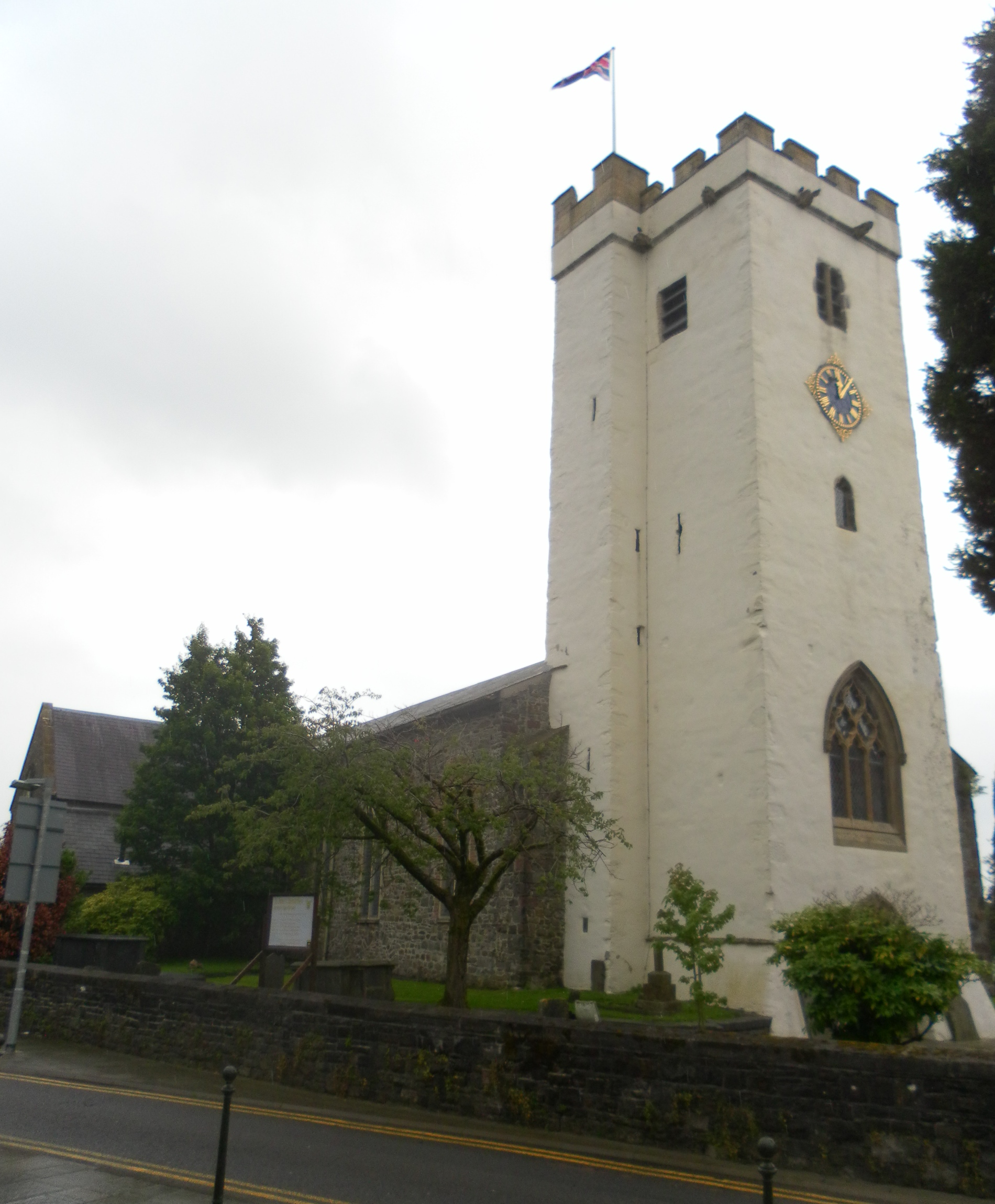
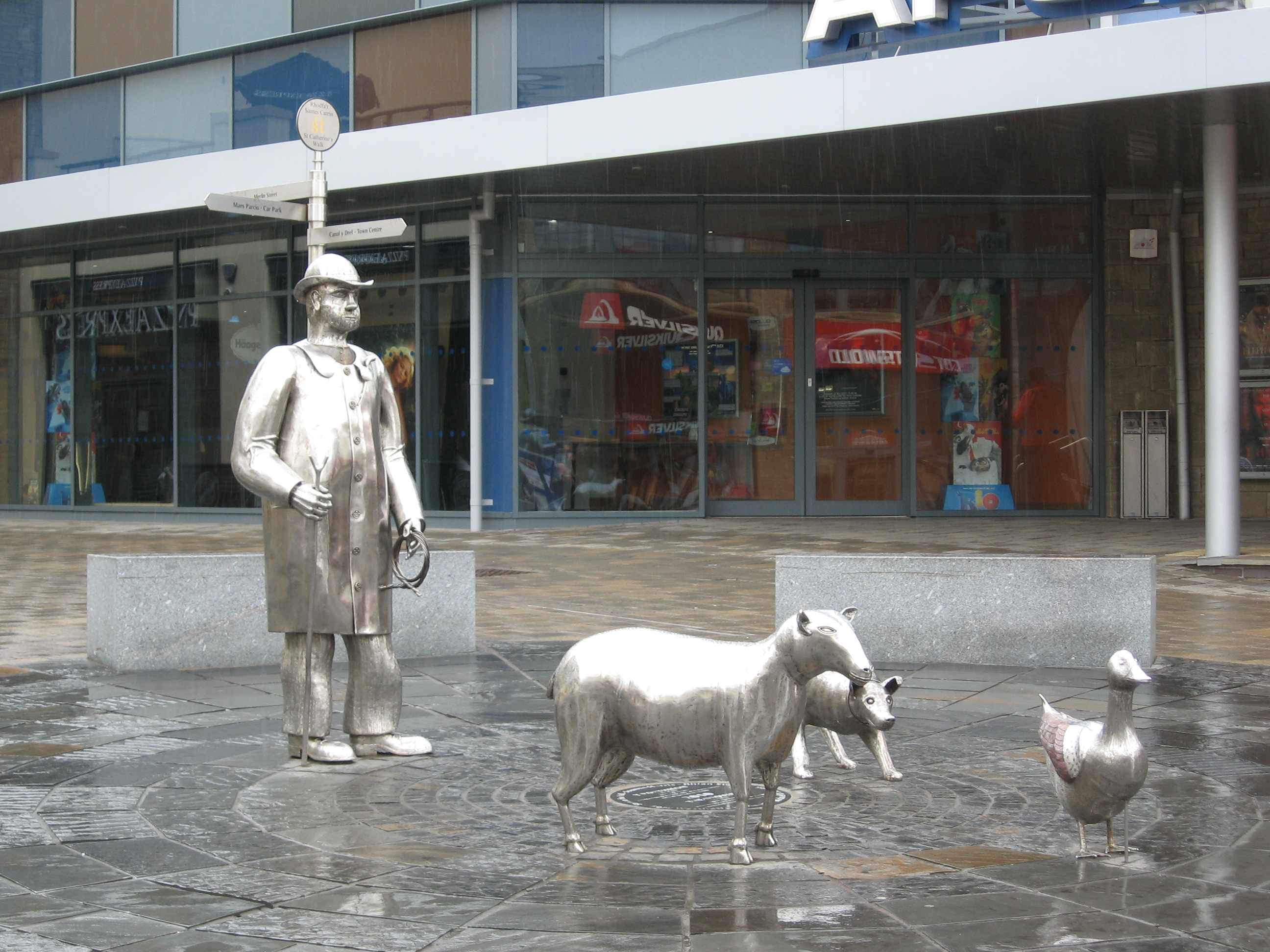
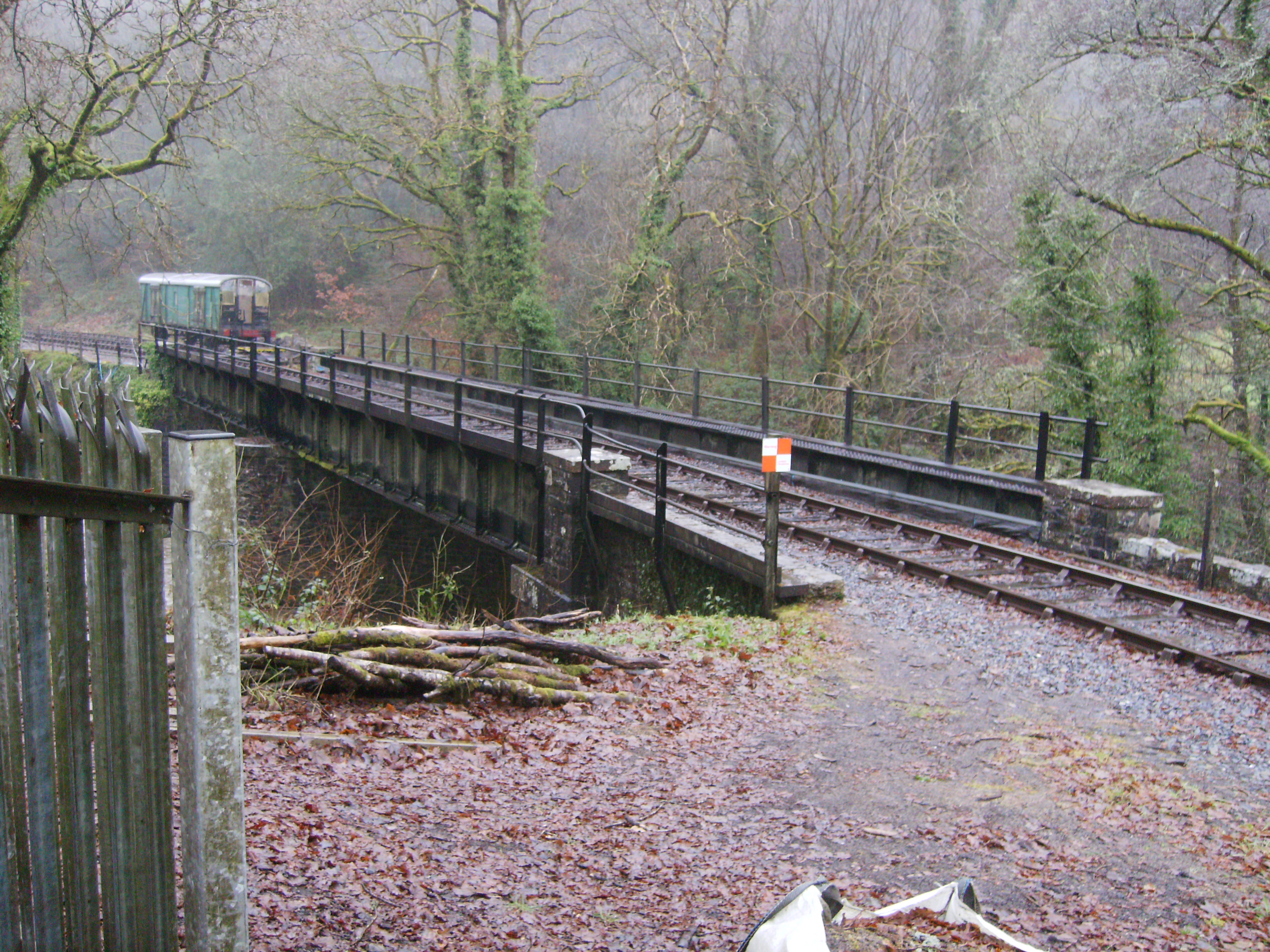
- Top: Carmarthen Guildhall, Middle: Carmarthen Castle, St Peter's Church, Bottom: St Catherine's Walk, Gwili Steam Railway

- Location within Carmarthenshire
- Population: 14,636 (Community, 2021); 16,455 (Built up area, 2021)
- OS grid reference: SN415205
- Community: Carmarthen
- Principal area: Carmarthenshire
- Preserved county: Dyfed
- Country: Wales
- Sovereign state: United Kingdom
- Post town: CARMARTHEN
- Postcode district: SA31-33
- Dialling code: 01267
- Police: Dyfed-Powys
- Fire: Mid and West Wales
- Ambulance: Welsh
- UK Parliament: Caerfyrddin
- Senedd Cymru – Welsh Parliament: Carmarthen East and Dinefwr; Carmarthen West and South Pembrokeshire
- Website: www.carmarthentowncouncil.gov.uk
- List of places UK Wales Carmarthenshire 51°51′31″N 4°18′48″W Map of the community

Carmarthen (UK: /kərˈmɑːrðən/ kər-MAR-dhən, locally /kɑːrˈ-/ kar-; Welsh: Caerfyrddin [kaːɨrˈvərðɪn], 'Merlin's fort' or possibly 'Sea-town fort') is a market town, community, and the county town of Carmarthenshire in Wales, lying on the River Towy 8 miles (13 km) north of its estuary in Carmarthen Bay. At the 2021 census the community had a population of 14,636, and the built up area had a population of 16,455. It stands on the site of a Roman town, and has a claim to be the oldest town in Wales. In the middle ages it comprised twin settlements: Old Carmarthen around Carmarthen Priory and New Carmarthen around Carmarthen Castle. The two were merged into one borough in 1546. It was the most populous borough in Wales in the 16th–18th centuries, described by William Camden as "chief citie of the country". It was overtaken in size by the mid-19th century, following the growth of settlements in the South Wales Coalfield.

== History ==
=== Early history ===
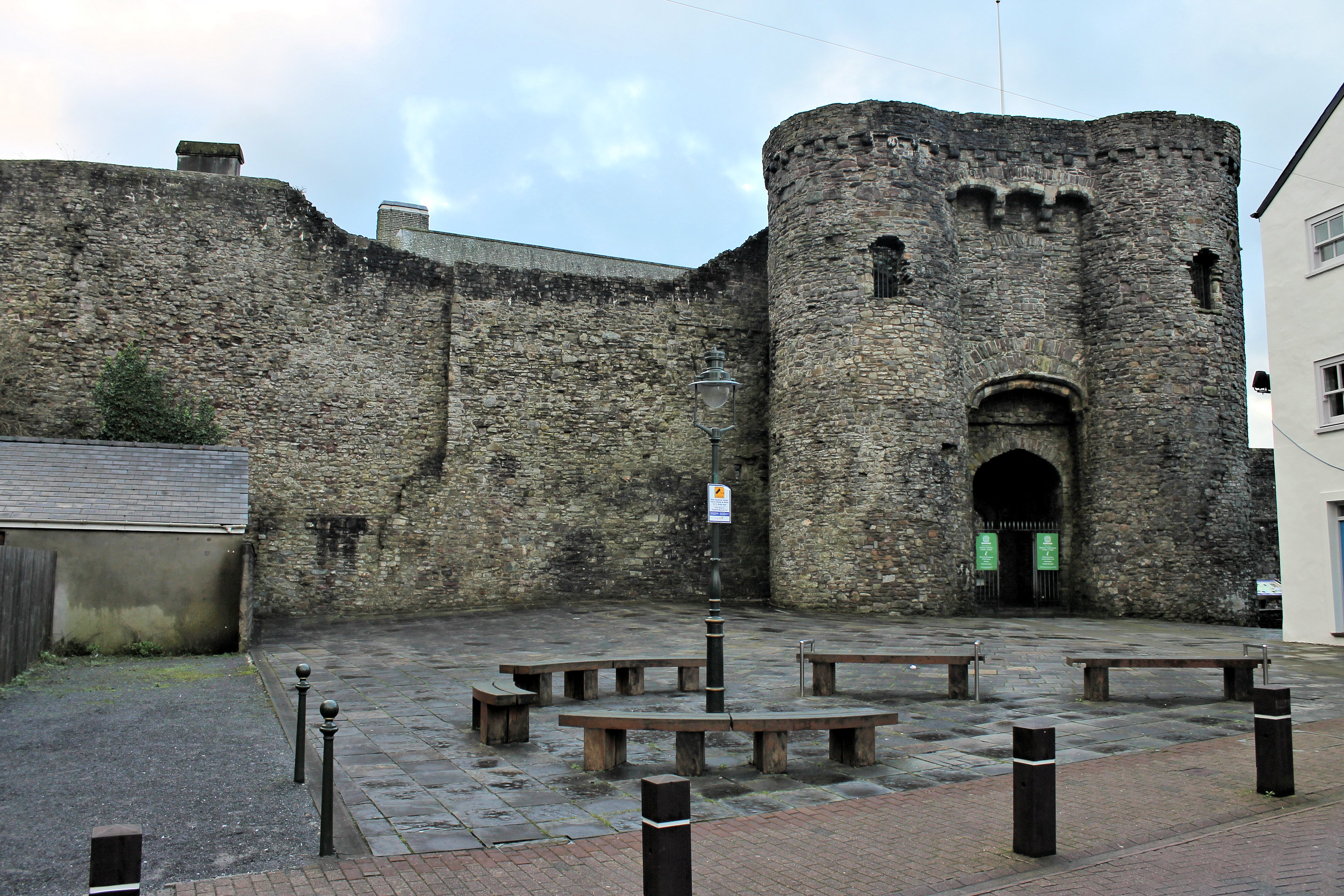
Carmarthen Castle, main gateway

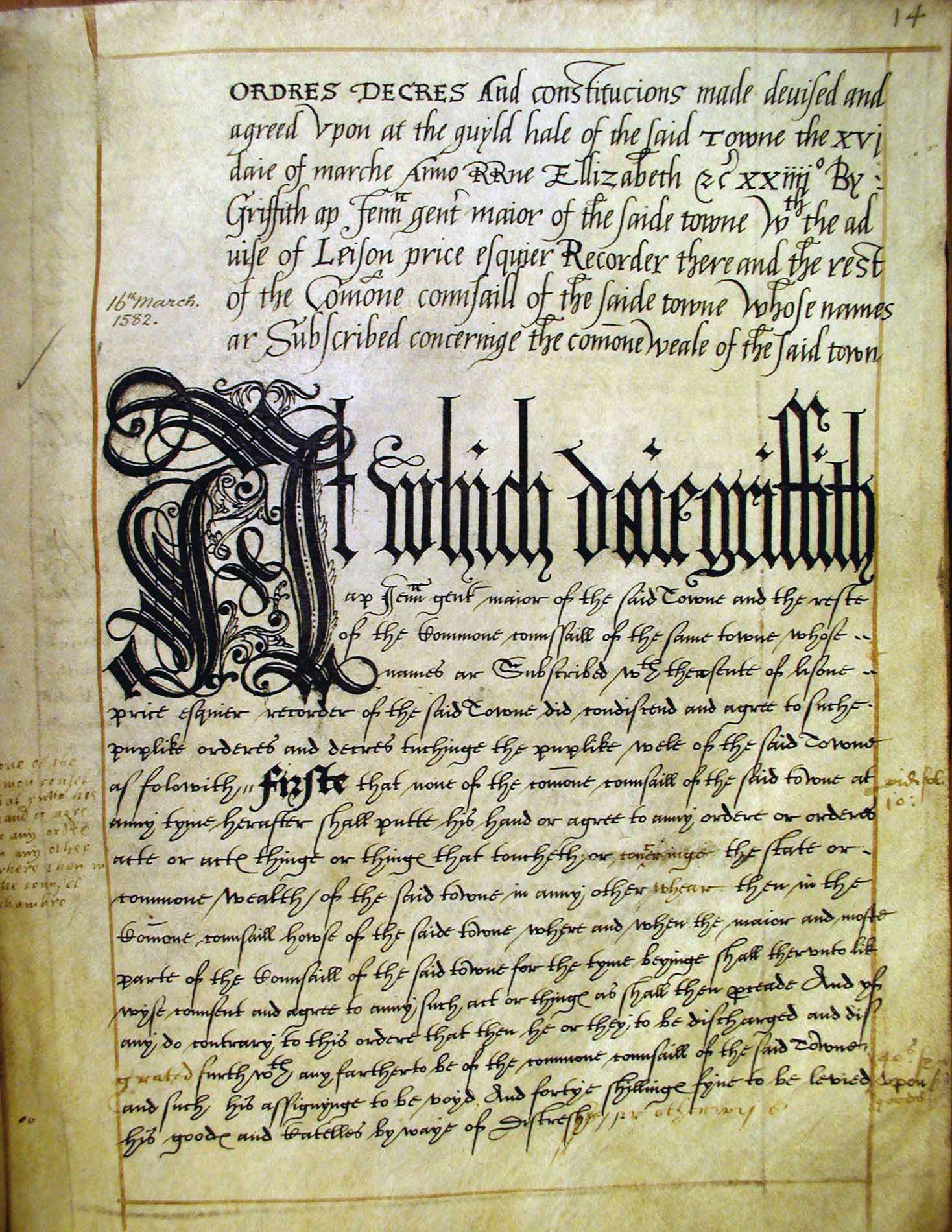
A page from Carmarthen Borough's Book of Ordinances, 1582

When Britannia was a Roman province, Carmarthen was the civitas capital of the Demetae tribe, known as Moridunum ("Sea Fort"). It is possibly the oldest town in Wales, recorded by Ptolemy and in the Antonine Itinerary. The Roman fort is believed to date from about AD 75. A Roman coin hoard was found nearby in 2006. Near the fort is one of seven surviving Roman amphitheatres in Britain and only two in Roman Wales (the other being at Isca Augusta, Roman Caerleon). Excavated in 1968, the Carmarthen fort has an arena of 50 by 30 yards (about 46 by 27 metres); the cavea (seating area) is 100 by 73 yards (92 by 67 metres). Michael Veprauskas (1998) argued for identifying it as the Cair Guorthigirn ("Fort Vortigern") listed by Nennius among the 28 cities of Britain in his History of the Britons. Evidence of the early Roman town has been investigated for several years, revealing urban sites likely to date from the 2nd century.

During the Middle Ages, the settlement then known as Llanteulyddog ('St Teulyddog's) accounted one of the seven principal sees (Cantrefi) in Dyfed. The strategic importance of Carmarthen caused the Norman William fitz Baldwin to build a castle there, probably about 1094. The current castle site is known to have been occupied since 1105. The castle itself was destroyed by Llywelyn the Great in 1215, but rebuilt in 1223, when permission was given for a town wall and crenellations, making it one of the first medieval walled towns in Wales. In 1405, the town was captured and the castle sacked by Owain Glyndŵr. The Black Book of Carmarthen of about 1250 is associated with the town's Priory of SS John the Evangelist and Teulyddog.

The Black Death of 1347–1349 arrived in Carmarthen with the thriving river trade. It destroyed and devastated villages such as Llanllwch. Local historians cite the plague pit for the mass burial of the dead in the graveyard that adjoins the Maes-yr-Ysgol and Llys Model housing at the rear of St Catherine Street.

=== Priory ===
In 1110, the ancient Clas church of Llandeulyddog, an independent, pre-Norman religious community, became the Benedictine Priory of St Peter, only to be replaced 15 years later by the Augustinian Priory of St John the Evangelist and St Teulyddog. This stood near the river, at what is now Priory Street (51.8601°N 4.2975°W, SN418204). The site is now a scheduled monument.

=== Grey Friars ===
Franciscan Friars (Grey Friars, or Friars minor) became established in the town in the 13th century, and by 1284 had their own Friary buildings in Lammas Street (51.855794°N 4.309076°W), on a site now holding a shopping centre. The Franciscan emphasis on poverty and simplicity meant the church was smaller (some "70 to 80 feet long and 30 feet broad" – 21/24 by 9 m) and more austere than the older foundations, but this did not prevent an accumulation of treasures, as it became a sought-after location for burial. In 1456 Edmund Tudor, 1st Earl of Richmond died of plague in Carmarthen, three months before the birth of his son, the future King Henry VII. Edmund was buried in a prominent tomb in the centre of the choir of the Grey Friars Church. Other notables buried there were Rhys ap Thomas and Tudur Aled.

The Friary was dissolved in 1538, and many unsuccessful plans were made for the building. Even before the friars had left in 1536, William Barlow campaigned to have the cathedral moved into it from St David's, where the tomb and remains of Edmund Tudor were moved after the Carmarthen buildings were deconsecrated. There were repeated attempts to turn the buildings into a grammar school. Gradually they became ruined, although the church walls were still recognisable in the mid-18th century. By 1900 all the stonework had been stripped off and there were no traces above ground. The site remained undeveloped until the 1980s and 1990s, after extensive archaeological excavations of first the monastic buildings and then the nave and chancel of the church. These confirmed that the former presence of a church, a chapter house and a large cloister, with a smaller cloister and infirmary added later. Over 200 graves were found in the churchyard and 60 around the friars' choir.

=== Arthurian legend ===
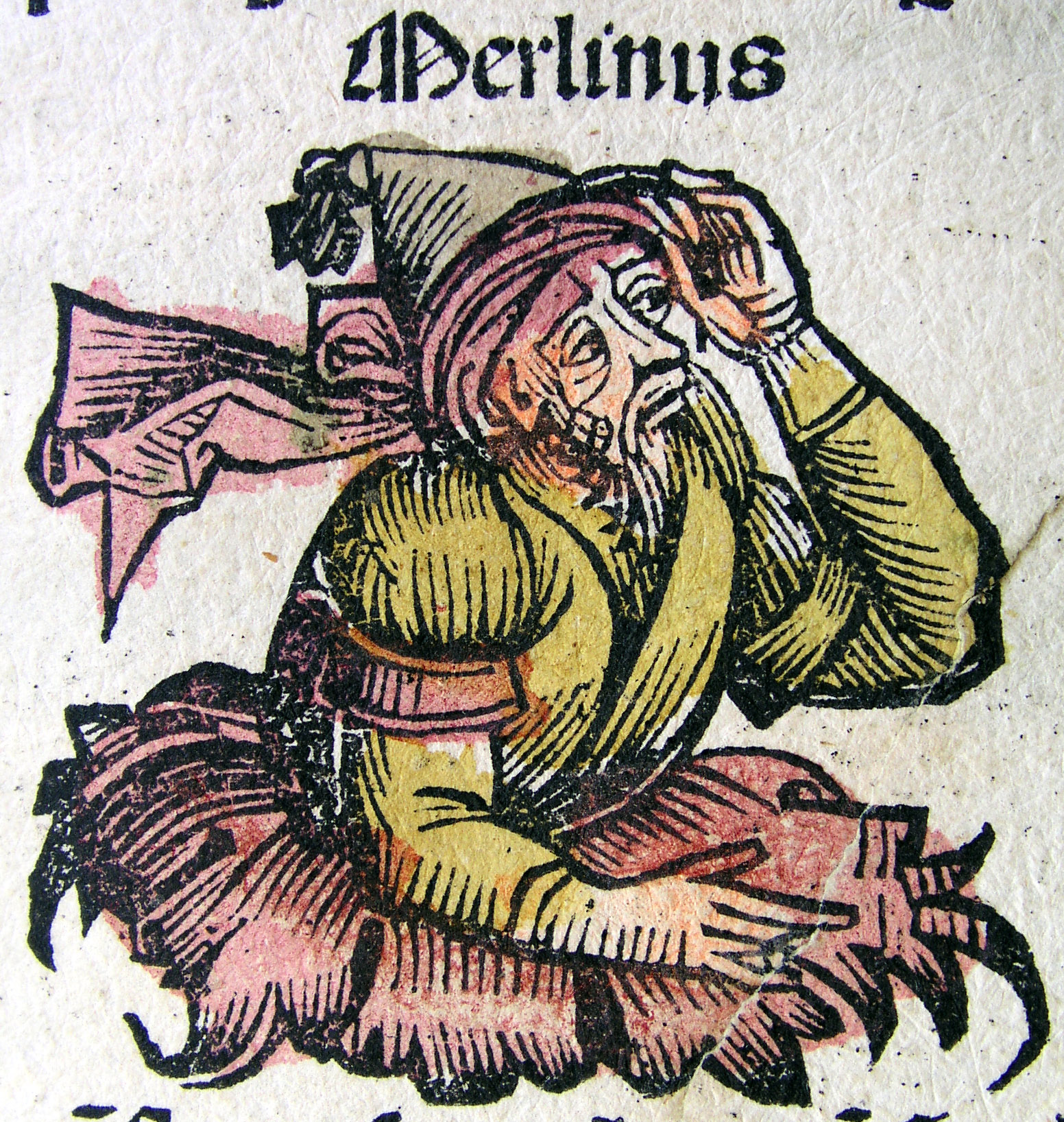
Merlin, from the Nuremberg Chronicle (1493)

Geoffrey of Monmouth, writing in 1188, began the legend that Merlin was born in a cave outside Carmarthen. The town's Welsh name, Caerfyrddin, is widely claimed to mean "Merlin's fort", but a reverse etymology is also suggested: the name Merlin may have originated from the town's name in the anglicised form of Myrddin. (See Merlin § Name). An alternative explanation is that Myrddin is a corruption of the town's Roman name, Moridunum, meaning "sea fort."

Legend also had it that if a certain tree called Merlin's Oak fell, it would bring the downfall of the town. Translated from Welsh, it reads: "When Merlin's Oak comes tumbling down/Down shall fall Carmarthen Town." To obstruct this, the tree was dug up when it died; pieces of it remain in the town museum.

The Black Book of Carmarthen includes poems that refer to Myrddin (Ymddiddan Myrddin a Thaliesin, "Conversation of Merlin and Taliesin") and possibly to Arthur (Pa ŵr yw'r Porthor?, "What man is the porter?"). Interpretation of these is difficult, as the Arthurian legends were known by this time and details of the modern form had been described by Geoffrey of Monmouth before the book was written. Some historians suggest that Vortigern along with his army from Powys may have invaded the Ystrad Tywi in order to gain control of it but had to retreat either due to local rebels fighting back or being defeated by Dyfed, but in the process may have kidnapped a young Merlin from Carmarthen hence why the character is legendary within the town.

=== Early modern ===
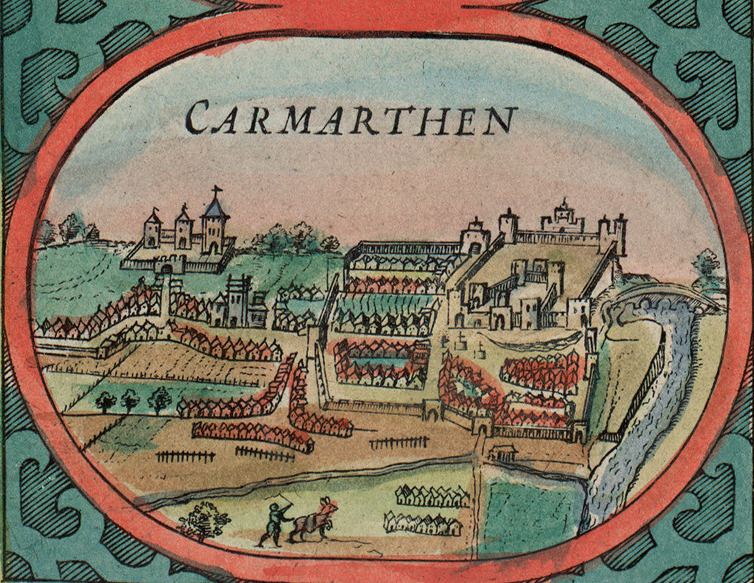
John Speed's 1610 map of Carmarthen.

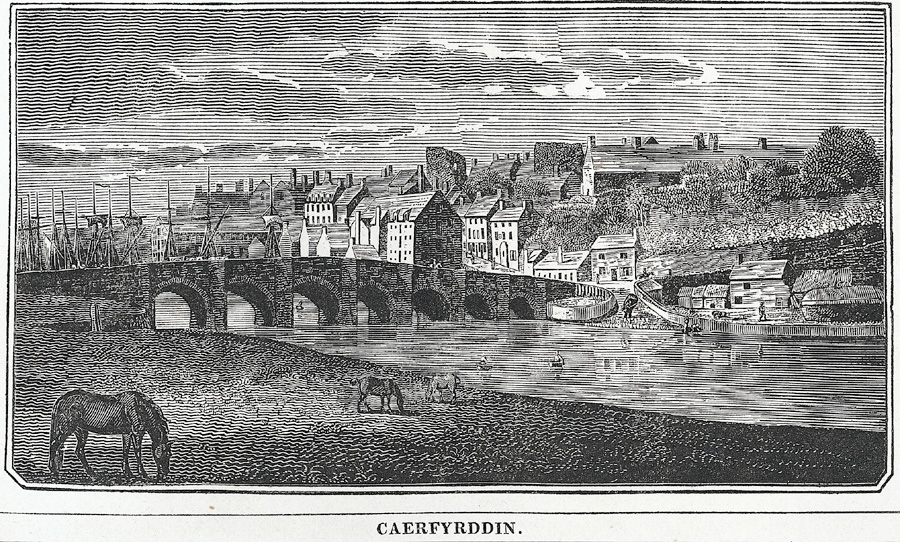
Carmarthen, 1823

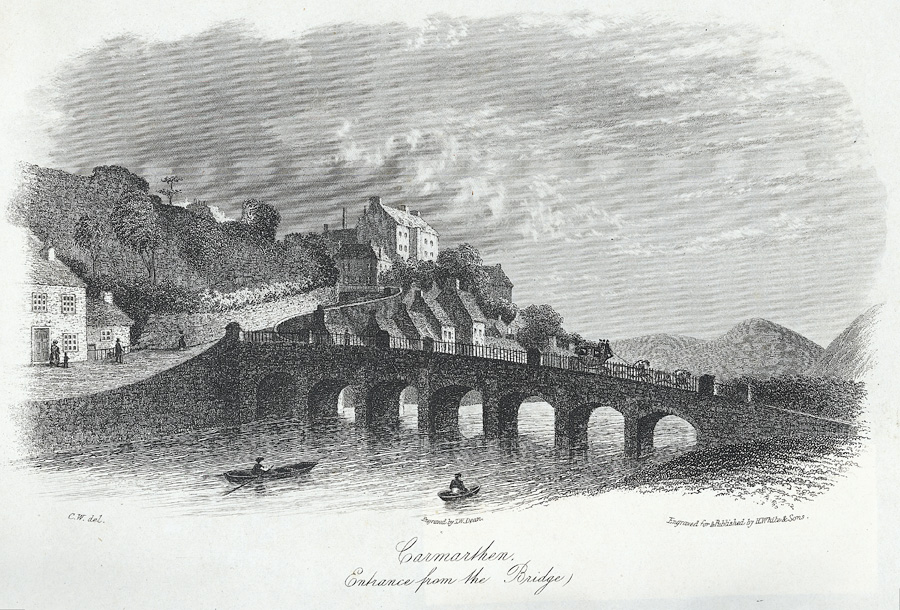
Carmarthen, Entrance from the Bridge, 1865

One of the earliest recorded Eisteddfodau took place at Carmarthen in about 1451, presided over by Gruffudd ap Nicolas.

The Book of Ordinances (1569–1606) is one of the earliest surviving minute books of a town in Wales. It gives a unique picture of an Elizabethan town.

After the incorporation of Wales into the legal system of England, Carmarthen became judicial headquarters of the Court of Great Sessions for south-west Wales. The town's dominant pursuits in the 16th and 17th centuries were still agriculture and related trades, including woollen manufacture.

The Priory and the Friary were abandoned after the dissolution of the monasteries under Henry VIII. The chapels of St Catherine and St Barbara were lost. The Church of St Peter's survived as the main religious establishment. During the Marian persecutions of the 1550s, Bishop Ferrar of St David's was burnt at the stake in the market square – now Nott Square. His life and death as a Protestant martyr are recorded in Foxe's Book of Martyrs.

In 1689, John Osborne, 1st Earl of Danby, was created 1st Marquess of Carmarthen by William III. He was then created Duke of Leeds in 1694, and Marquess of Carmarthen became the courtesy title for the Duke's heir apparent until the Dukedom became extinct on the death of the 12th Duke in 1964.

=== 18th century to present ===
In 1746, the Society of Friends (Quakers) erected the first Friends' meeting house in Gell Street (alternatively named Geer Street or Lamas Street). The cost of building it was raised by subscription among the Quakers. There had been a Quaker presence in Carmarthen since 1700, but it was not until 1746 that they had their own building.

In the mid-18th century, Robert Morgan founded a small ironworks at the east end of the town. In 1786 lead smelting was established to process the ore carried from Lord Cawdor's mines at Nantyrmwyn, in the north-east of Carmarthenshire. Neither of these firms survived for long. The lead smelting moved to Llanelli in 1811. The ironworks evolved into a tinplate works that had failed by about 1900.

The borough corporation was reformed by a 1764 charter and again by the Municipal Corporations Act 1835.

In the late 18th century John Spurrell, an auctioneer from Bath, settled in Carmarthen. He was the grandson of Robert Spurrell, a Bath schoolmaster, who printed the city's first book, The Elements of Chronology in 1730. In 1840, a printing press was set up in Carmarthen by William Spurrell, who wrote a history of the town and compiled and published an 1848 Welsh-English dictionary and an 1850 English–Welsh dictionary. Today's Collins Welsh dictionary is known as the "Collins Spurrell". A local housing authority in Carmarthen is named Heol Spurrell in honour of the family.

The origins of Chartism in Wales can be traced to the foundation in the autumn of 1836 of Carmarthen Working Men's Association.

Carmarthen jail, authorised by the Carmarthen Improvement Act 1792 (32 Geo. 3. c. 104) and designed by John Nash, was in use from about the year 1789 until its demolition in 1922. The site is now taken by County Hall, designed by Sir Percy Thomas. The jail's "Felons' Register" of 1843–1871 contains some of the earliest photographs of criminals in Britain.

In 1843, the Carmarthen Workhouse was attacked by the Rebecca Rioters.

The revival of the Eisteddfod as an institution took place in Carmarthen in 1819, hosted at the Ivy Bush Royal Hotel. The town hosted the National Eisteddfod in 1867, 1911 and 1974, although at least in 1974, the Maes was at Abergwili.

Carmarthen Grammar School was founded in 1587 on a site now occupied by the old hospital in Priory Street. The school moved in the 1840s to Priory Row, before relocating to Richmond Terrace. At the turn of the 20th century, a local travelling circus buried one of its elephants that fell sick and died. The grave is under what was the rugby pitch.

The population in 1841 was 9,526.

World War II prisoner-of-war camps were placed in Johnstown (where the Davies Estate now stands) and at Glangwili — the huts being used as part of the Glangwili General Hospital since its inception. To the west of the town was the "Carmarthen Stop Line", one of a network of defensive lines created in 1940–1941 in case of invasion, with a series of ditches and pill boxes running north and south. Most have since been removed or filled in, but two remain.

The Carmarthen community is bordered by those of Bronwydd, Abergwili, Llangunnor, Llandyfaelog, Llangain, Llangynog and Newchurch and Merthyr, all in Carmarthenshire.

Carmarthen was named as one of the best places to live in Wales in 2017.

== Governance ==
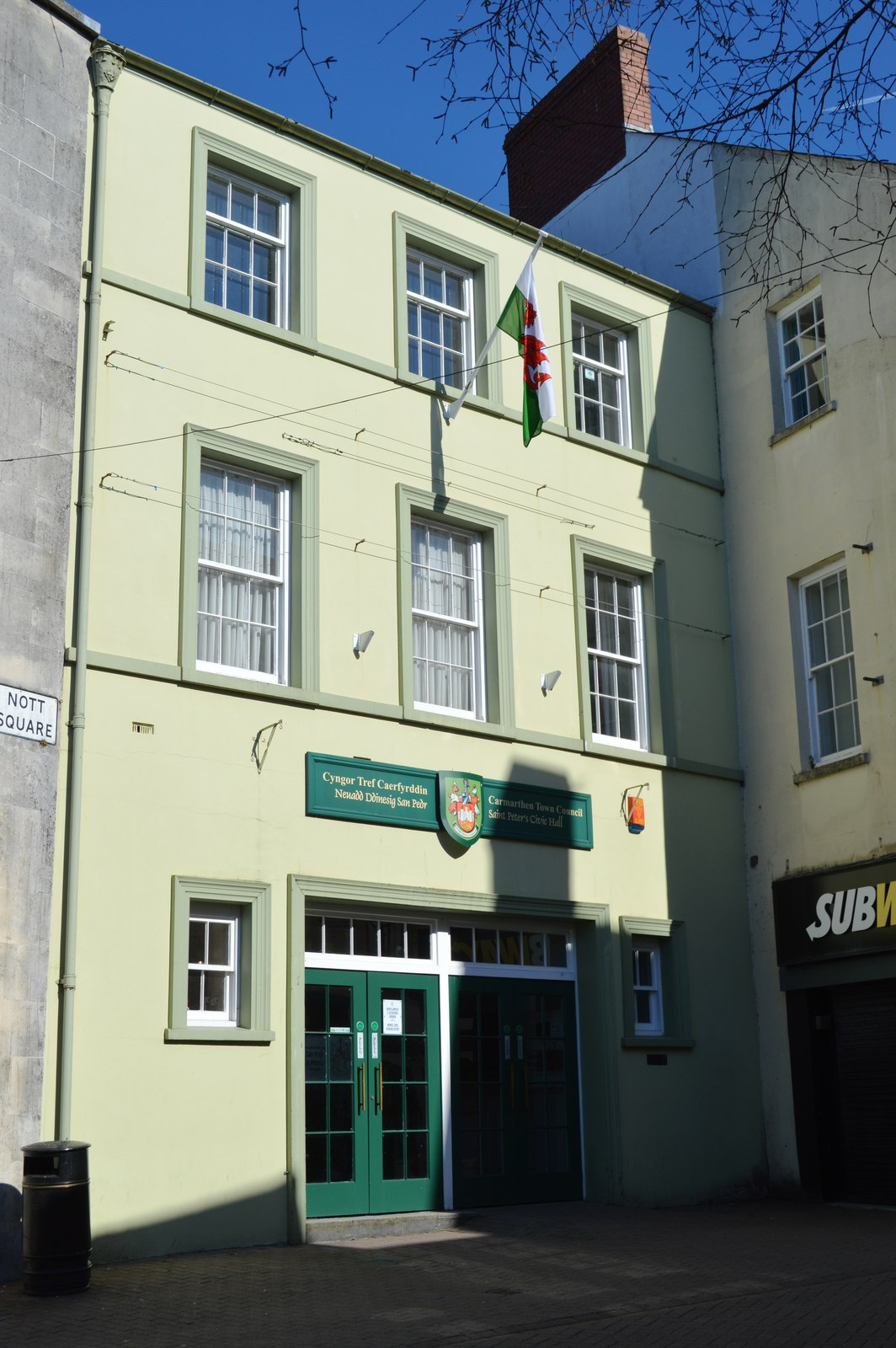
St Peter's Civic Hall, headquarters of Carmarthen Town Council

There are two tiers of local government covering Carmarthen, at community (town) and county level: Carmarthen Town Council (Cyngor Tref Caerfyrddin) and Carmarthenshire County Council (Cyngor Sir Gâr). The town council is based at St Peter's Civic Hall at 1 Nott Square, a 19th-century building which was formerly used as a church hall before being bought by the town council in 1977. The county council is also based in the town, having its headquarters at County Hall on Castle Hill, occupying much of the site of Carmarthen Castle.

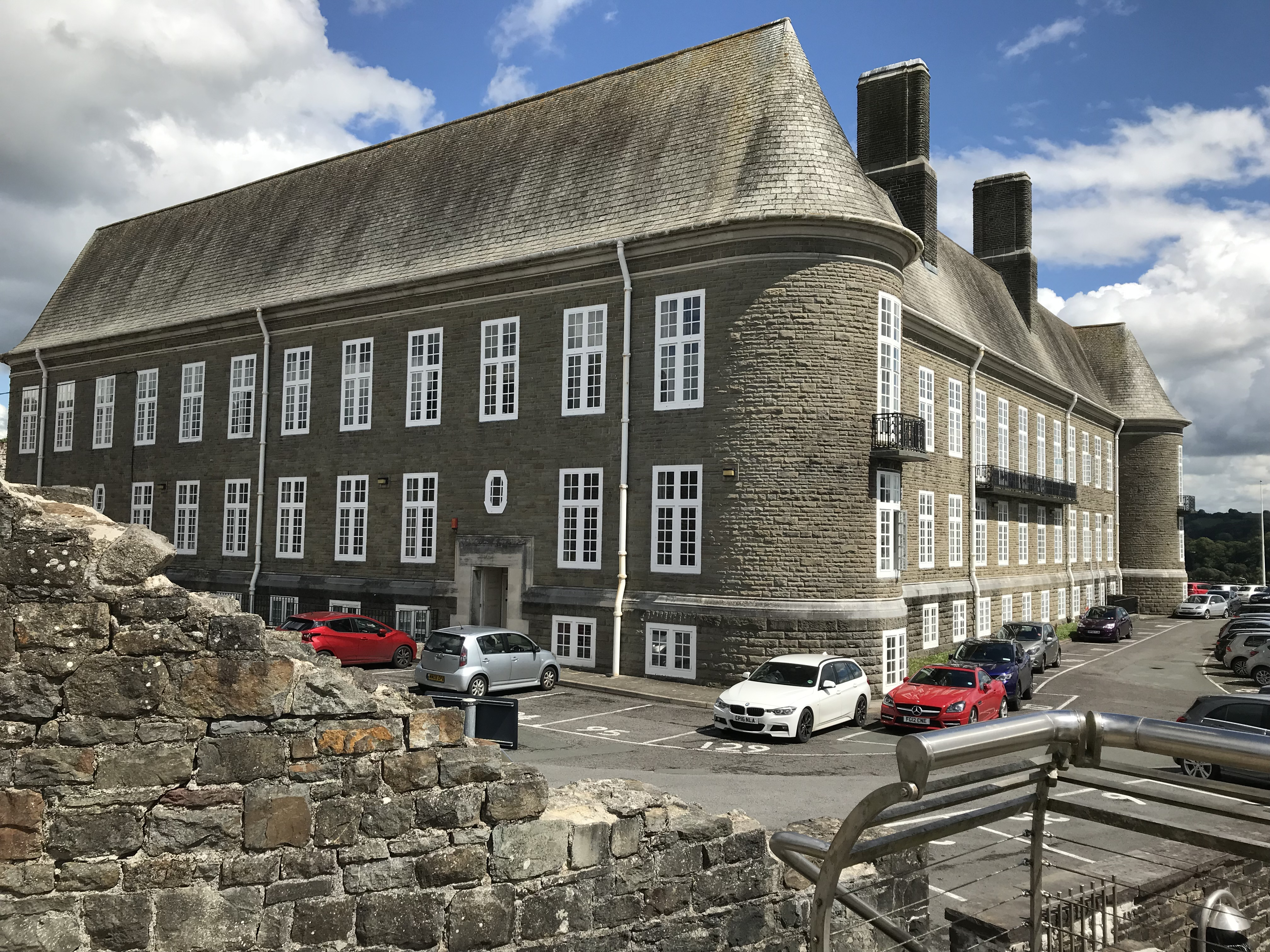
County Hall, headquarters of Carmarthenshire County Council

=== Administrative history ===
Carmarthen was an ancient parish, also known as St Peter's after its parish church. The parish included rural areas as well as the town itself, particularly to the north and west of the town. A settlement, later known as Old Carmarthen, is known to have existed prior to the construction of the castle and the adjoining Anglo-Norman town of New Carmarthen, which were developed from the early 12th century. New Carmarthen was administered as a borough from at least the 13th century. The borough boundary was tightly drawn around the new town; the castle itself and Old Carmarthen lay outside the borough boundaries. The borough was enlarged to cover the whole parish in 1546, bringing Old Carmarthen into the borough, which was thereafter called Carmarthen.

In 1604, a charter from James I gave the borough the right to appoint its own sheriffs, making it a county corporate, independent from the jurisdiction of the Sheriff of Carmarthenshire. The borough was reformed to become a municipal borough in 1836 under the Municipal Corporations Act 1835, which standardised how most boroughs operated across the country. When elected county councils were created in 1889, despite being a county corporate, Carmarthen was not considered large enough to be made a county borough providing its own county-level local government functions. It was therefore included in the administrative county of Carmarthenshire, under the authority of the new Carmarthenshire County Council.

Carmarthen Castle was historically excluded from both the parish and borough of Carmarthen, forming a detached part of the parish of Newchurch. The castle was transferred to the parish of Carmarthen in 1885, and was brought within the borough boundaries in 1898.

The borough of Carmarthen was abolished in 1974 under the Local Government Act 1972. A community called Carmarthen was created covering the area of the former borough, with its community council taking the name Carmarthen Town Council. District-level functions passed to the new Carmarthen District Council. Carmarthenshire County Council was abolished as part of the same reforms, with county-level functions passing to the new Dyfed County Council. The district of Carmarthen and county of Dyfed were both abolished in 1996 and their councils' functions passed to a re-established Carmarthenshire County Council. Carmarthen Town Council retains the right to appoint its own sheriff, based on the town's former status as a county corporate.

=== Constituency ===
From 1536 until 1832 the borough formed the Carmarthen parliamentary constituency, electing its own MP to the House of Commons. By the late 18th century, Carmarthen, as one of the largest towns in Wales at the time, was the scene of a succession of hotly contested electoral contests between the Blues (Whigs) and Reds (Tories). These reached a climax in 1831 with the general election fought in the midst of the Reform Crisis. The contest was characterised by riots and disturbances, described as "exceptional because of their intensity and duration".

From 1832 the constituency was known as the Carmarthen District of Boroughs, or Carmarthen Boroughs, including both Carmarthen and Llanelli; the latter gradually became dominant as its population overtook Carmarthen's. The Carmarthen Boroughs constituency was abolished in 1918 and replaced by a county constituency called Carmarthen covering the town and surrounding rural areas. In a by-election in the constituency in 1966, Gwynfor Evans was elected as the first Plaid Cymru MP. In 2024 new constituency boundaries came into effect and it was given the Welsh name Caerfyrddin as its primary name.

== Climate ==
Climate data for Carmarthen (1991–2020)
Month	Jan	Feb	Mar	Apr	May	Jun	Jul	Aug	Sep	Oct	Nov	Dec	Year
Record high °C (°F)	13.0 (55.4)	12.8 (55.0)	20.6 (69.1)	24.0 (75.2)	27.2 (81.0)	32.8 (91.0)	32.5 (90.5)	30.0 (86.0)	26.6 (79.9)	24.0 (75.2)	17.2 (63.0)	14.8 (58.6)	32.8 (91.0)
Mean daily maximum °C (°F)	8.6 (47.5)	9.1 (48.4)	10.9 (51.6)	14.0 (57.2)	16.9 (62.4)	19.3 (66.7)	21.0 (69.8)	20.6 (69.1)	18.2 (64.8)	14.9 (58.8)	11.5 (52.7)	9.1 (48.4)	14.5 (58.1)
Daily mean °C (°F)	5.3 (41.5)	5.6 (42.1)	7.0 (44.6)	9.3 (48.7)	12.1 (53.8)	14.7 (58.5)	16.4 (61.5)	15.9 (60.6)	14.0 (57.2)	11.1 (52.0)	7.9 (46.2)	5.7 (42.3)	10.4 (50.7)
Mean daily minimum °C (°F)	2.1 (35.8)	2.2 (36.0)	3.1 (37.6)	4.7 (40.5)	7.3 (45.1)	10.0 (50.0)	11.9 (53.4)	11.2 (52.2)	9.7 (49.5)	7.2 (45.0)	4.2 (39.6)	2.3 (36.1)	6.3 (43.3)
Record low °C (°F)	−16.5 (2.3)	−13.3 (8.1)	−10.6 (12.9)	−7.0 (19.4)	−4.0 (24.8)	−0.6 (30.9)	2.8 (37.0)	1.7 (35.1)	−1.7 (28.9)	−3.8 (25.2)	−10.0 (14.0)	−10.6 (12.9)	−16.5 (2.3)
Average precipitation mm (inches)	139.2 (5.48)	116.8 (4.60)	93.0 (3.66)	77.3 (3.04)	74.4 (2.93)	79.2 (3.12)	74.4 (2.93)	117.9 (4.64)	114.5 (4.51)	155.2 (6.11)	148.2 (5.83)	155.8 (6.13)	1,345.9 (52.99)
Average precipitation days (≥ 1.0 mm)	16.7	13.0	13.7	11.7	9.3	9.6	10.5	11.8	12.0	15.9	16.9	15.8	156.9
Mean monthly sunshine hours	55.4	80.9	122.6	183.8	211.6	202.8	194.9	172.4	137.1	103.8	67.4	50.1	1,582.6
Source 1: Met Office (precipitation days 1981-2010)
Source 2: Starlings Roost Weather

== Religion ==
=== Anglicanism ===
The Anglican Church in Wales (Eglwys yng Nghymru) has six dioceses. St Peter's is the largest parish church in the Diocese of St David's and has the longest nave: 200 feet (60 metres) from west porch to east window and 50 feet (15 metres) across the nave and south aisle. In 1954, St Peter's became a Grade I listed building. It consists of a west tower, nave, chancel, south aisle and a consistory court, built of local red sandstone and grey shale. The tower contains eight bells, of which the heaviest, tuned to E, weighs 15 cwt 46 lb (783 kg).

By the early 19th century, St Peter's was too small to accommodate the congregation, which had grown in line with the town's population. After several false starts a new church, St David's, was consecrated in 1841. Another church in the same western part of the town, Christ Church, opened in 1869 to serve the English-speaking congregation.

=== Catholicism ===
St Mary's, Carmarthen is part of the Carmarthen Deanery.

=== Nonconformity ===
Carmarthen has several notable nonconformist chapels, some of which date back to the 18th century or earlier.

A Baptist chapel was founded in Dark Gate in 1762 and then moved in 1812 to Waterloo Terrace under the ministry of Titus Lewis. The new chapel became known as the Tabernacle. The English Baptist Church in Lammas Street dates from 1870. The two chapels remained open in 2024. Another Baptist chapel, Penuel on Priory Street dates from 1786; the present building was erected in 1872. The Penuel Baptist Chapel building was sold in 2024, but Eglwys Penuel Church still meets weekly at Building 4, Parc Dewi Sant, SA31 3HB.

Lammas Street Chapel is the town's oldest Congregational or Independent chapel, traceable back to 1726, with the present building erected a century later. Union Street Chapel, now closed, was formed after a split among the Lammas Street congregation. Priory Chapel, in Priory Street, was founded in 1872 as a branch of Ebenezer, Abergwili.

The earliest Calvinistic Methodist chapel was Water Street Chapel, which is now closed. It had ties with Peter Williams, who produced a celebrated Welsh-language version of the Bible in the 18th century. Bethania Chapel in Priory Street, dating from 1909, closed shortly after celebrating its centenary.

== Landmarks ==
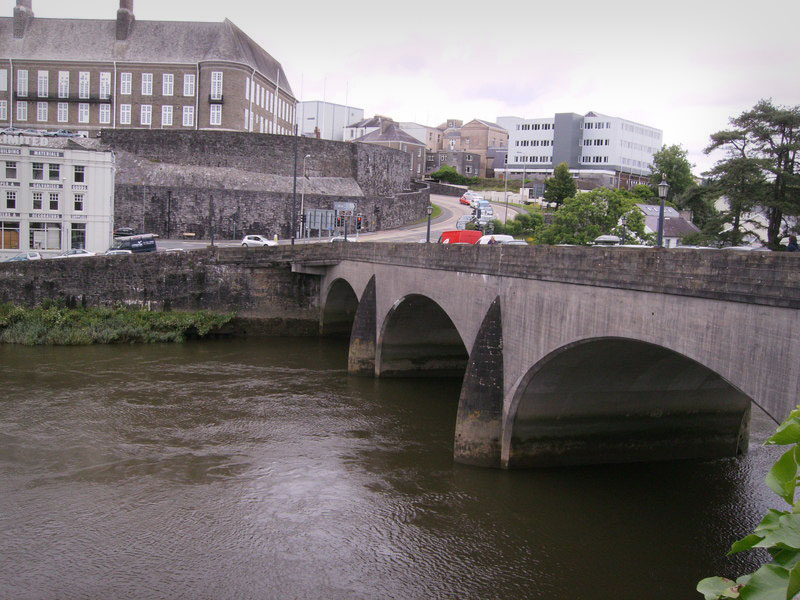
Carmarthen Bridge

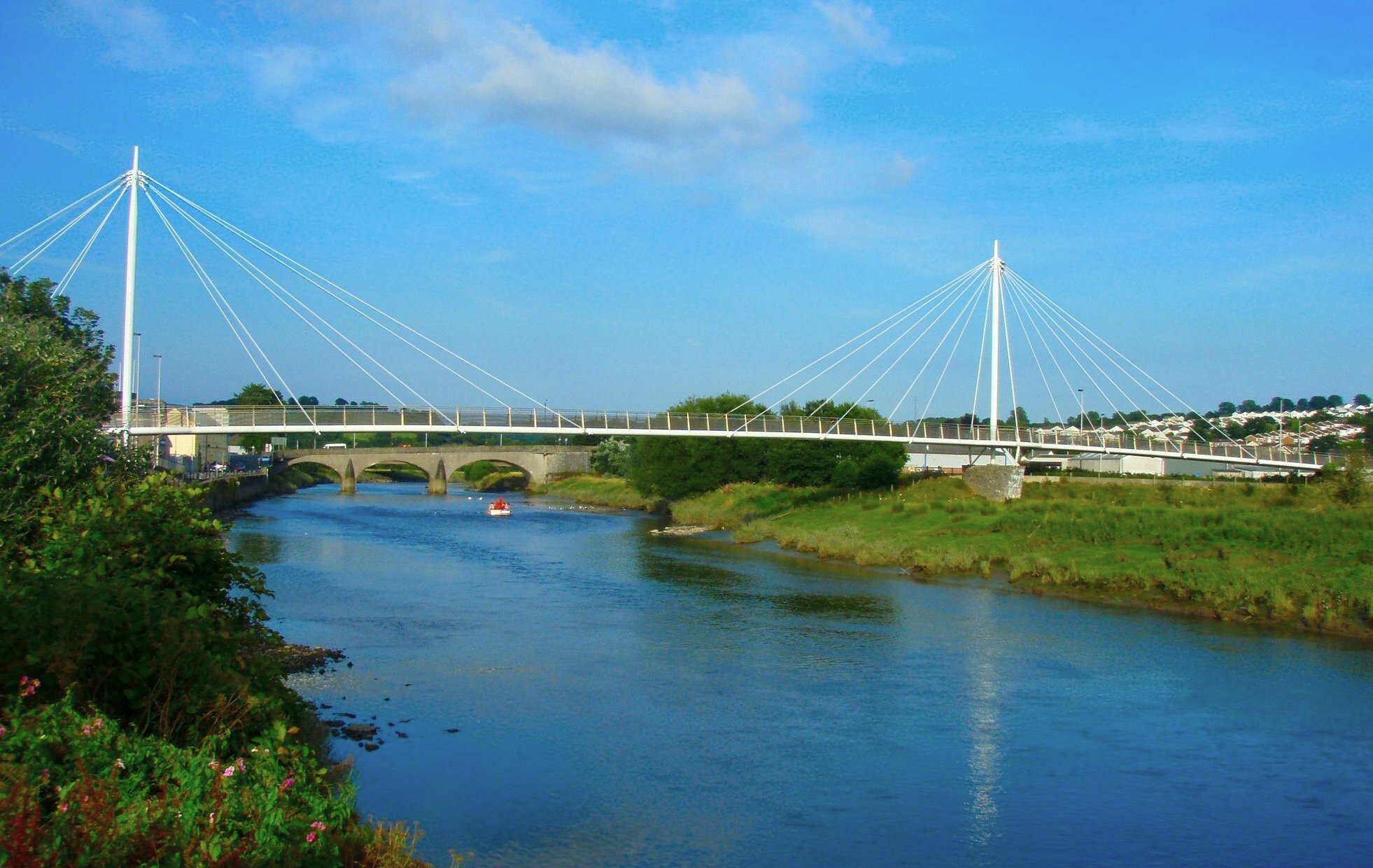
Pont King Morgan footbridge with Carmarthen Bridge in the background

=== Carmarthen Castle ===
Little remains of the medieval castle at Carmarthen, but the old Gatehouse still dominates Nott Square. The motte is also accessible to the public. Castle House, within the old walls, is a museum and Tourist Information Centre.

=== Carmarthen Bridge ===
The concrete A484 road bridge across the River Tywi designed by the Welsh architect Clough Williams-Ellis was completed in 1937. It was Grade II listed in 2003. The loss of the original medieval bridge that it replaced caused controversy.

=== Pont King Morgan ===
To create better pedestrian access across the River Tywi from the town's railway station to the town centre, a cable-stayed bridge was constructed in 2005 linking to the foot of Blue Street. The cost was £2.8 million. The bridge was commended in 2007 by the British Constructional Steelwork Association's Structural Steel Design Awards for its high-quality detailing. Previously, access was across Carmarthen Bridge some 700 feet (210 m) to the east.

=== Picton's monument ===
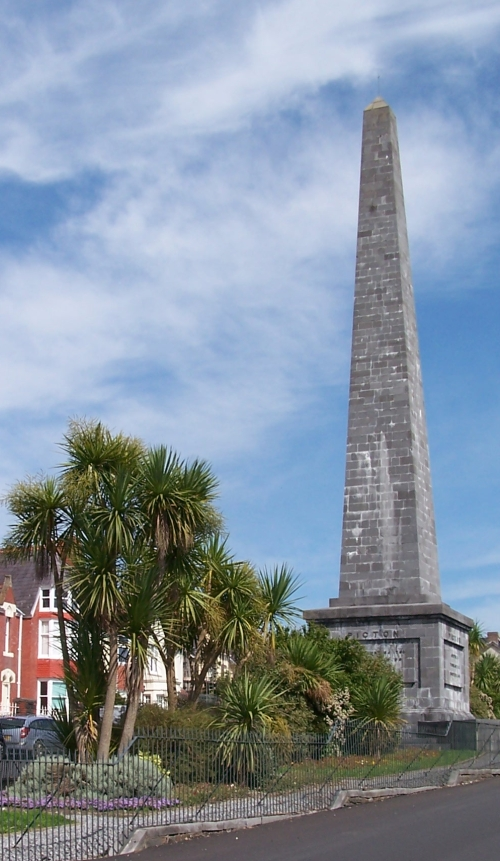
The Picton Monument in 2008

In 1828, a monument was erected at the west end of the town to honour Lieutenant General Sir Thomas Picton, from Haverfordwest, who had died at the Battle of Waterloo in 1815. The pillar, which was about 75 ft (23 m), was designed to echo Trajan's Column in Rome. A statue of Picton, wrapped in a cloak and supported by a baluster above emblems of spears surmounted the column.

Within a few years, the monument became dilapidated. The entire pillar was taken down in 1846. In the 1970s, the replacement sculptures were rediscovered in Johnstown and are now displayed in Carmarthenshire County Museum.

After demolition of the first monument, a new structure honouring Picton was commissioned from the architect Frances Fowler. The foundation stone was laid on Monument Hill in 1847. In 1984, the top section was declared unsafe and taken down. Four years later, the whole monument was rebuilt stone-by-stone on stronger foundations.

A campaign to remove the monument due to Picton's treatment of slaves arose in the wake of the removal of the Statue of Edward Colston in Bristol on 6 June 2020.

=== The Nott statue and plaque to Ferrar ===
A statue of General Nott was erected in 1851. According to the PMSA:

The bronze statue was cast from cannon captured at the battle of Maharajpur. Queen Victoria gave 200 guineas to the memorial fund. The statue occupies the site of the market cross, which was dismantled when the market was resited and Nott Square created in 1846.

The Market Square was where Bishop Robert Ferrar of St Davids was executed in March 1555. A small plaque below the statue of General Nott commemorates the place where he was burned at the stake during the Marian Persecutions.

== Listed buildings ==
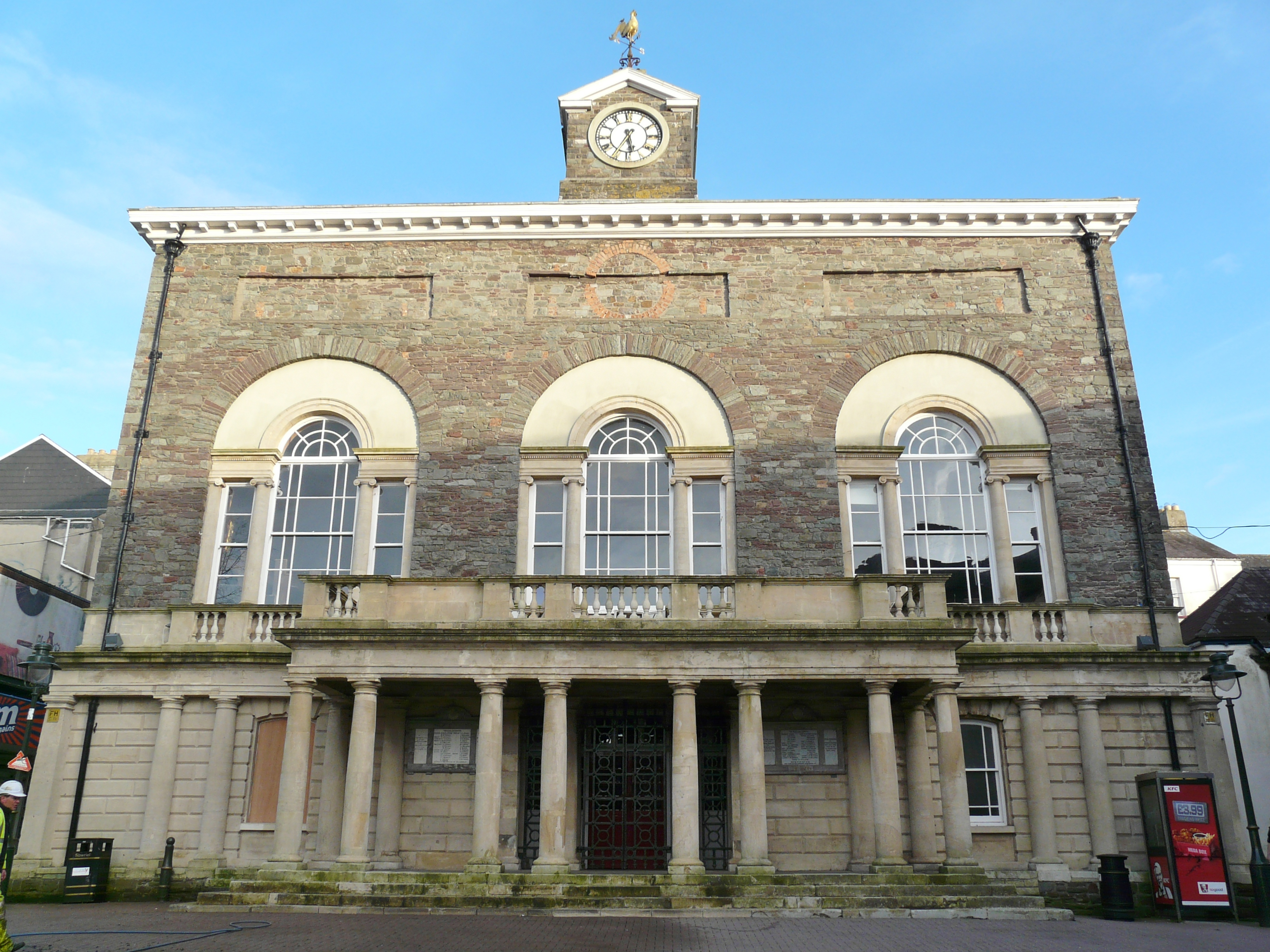
Carmarthen Guildhall

The many listed buildings include Carmarthen Guildhall, Carmarthen Infirmary, Capel Heol Awst, Capel Heol Dŵr, Carmarthen Cemetery Chapel, Elim Independent Chapel, English Baptist Church, English Congregational Church, Penuel Baptist Chapel, Christ Church, Eglwys Dewi Sant, Church of St Mary and Eglwys Sant Ioan, as well as Carmarthen Bridge.

== Amenities ==
Dyfed–Powys Police headquarters, Glangwili General Hospital and a campus of the University of Wales Trinity Saint David are located in Carmarthen.

The former cattle market in the heart of the town became a new shopping centre, which opened in 2010. It includes a multi-screen cinema, a market hall, restaurants and a multi-storey car park. A new market hall opened in 2009.

== Transport ==
=== Roads ===
The A40, A48, A484 and A485 converge on Carmarthen. The M4 motorway, which links South Wales with London, terminates at junction 49, the Pont Abraham services; the route continues north-west as the dual carriageway A48 and finishes at its junction with the A40 in Carmarthen.

=== Railway ===
Carmarthen railway station is a stop on the West Wales Line and opened in 1852. The town has rail links to Cardiff Central via Swansea to the east and Fishguard Harbour, Milford Haven, Tenby, Pembroke and Pembroke Dock to the west; these services are operated by Transport for Wales. There are daily direct inter-city trains to London, operated by Great Western Railway.

The area suffered a number of railway line closures in the 1960s under the Beeching Axe: one route to Llandeilo, which was closed in 1963, and one to Lampeter and Aberystwyth in 1965.

=== Buses ===
Local bus services are operated by several companies, including First Cymru Morris Travel, Jones Login and Taf Valley Coaches; routes connect the town with Aberystwyth, Cardiff, Llandeilo and Llanelli.

There is a Park and Ride service running daily from Monday to Saturday from 7.00 to 19.00 between Nantyci, to the west of Carmarthen town, and the town centre.

National Express operate two long-distance coach routes with stops in Carmarthen. Route 112 runs from Birmingham to Haverfordwest and the 508 links London with Haverfordwest.

== Sport ==
The town has two rugby union teams: Carmarthen Quins and Carmarthen Athletic. Quins currently plays in the Welsh Premier Division league, after promotion to the Premiership in the 2008/2009 season. CPC Bears, a rugby league club based in Carmarthen and the regional side for Carmarthenshire, Pembrokeshire and Ceredigion, plays in the Welsh Premier Division of the Rugby League Conference.

The town's semi-professional football team, Carmarthen Town F.C., plays in the Cymru South. Founded in 1948, it plays its home games at Richmond Park. The club colours, reflected in its crest and kit, are gold and black. The town also has a youth football team Carmarthen Stars that plays in the local Carmarthenshire Junior Leagues from the under-12s age group to the under-16s age group.

The town has two golf courses, a leisure centre with an eight-lane, 25-metre swimming pool (where the Carmarthen district swimming club is based), a synthetic athletics track and an outdoor velodrome. It also has an athletics team: Carmarthen Harriers. A cycle track opened in about 1900 and remains in use. Motorcycle speedway racing was staged in the early 2000s at a track built on the western outskirts of the town; the team raced in the Conference League.

== Picton Barracks ==
Picton Barracks is a military installation, based in the west part of the town, and is used by the Ministry of Defence. Two units currently reside there:

British Army

- 224 (Pembroke Yeomanry) Transport Squadron, 157th (Welsh) Regiment, Royal Logistic Corps (Army Reserve)
- Detached (Carmarthen) Platoon, 160 Theatre Support Company, 103rd Battalion Royal Electrical and Mechanical Engineers (Army Reserve)

Royal Air Force

- 621 (Carmarthen) Squadron, Air Training Corps, No. 3 Welsh Wing

== Notable people ==
See Category:People from Carmarthen
See Category:People from Carmarthenshire

- Alice Abadam (1856–1940), Welsh suffragist, feminist, Catholic and women’s rights campaigner
- Joe Allen (born 1990), Wales and Swansea City FC midfielder
- Rachel Barrett, Welsh suffragette and newspaper editor
- Dorothea Bate (1878–1951), archaeo-zoologist
- Charles Brigstocke (1876–1951), civil servant
- Dale Buggins (1961–1981), motorcycle stunt rider
- Fflur Dafydd (born 1978), writer and musician
- Barry Davies (born 1981), Ospreys full-back
- Gareth Davies (born 1990), Scarlets scrum-half
- Mark Delaney (born 1976), former Wales and Aston Villa football defender
- Mark Drakeford (born 1954), Welsh politician, former leader of Welsh Labour and First Minister of Wales
- Dave Evans, singer and musician, original lead vocalist of Australian rock band AC/DC from 1973 to 1974
- Wynne Evans (born 1972), opera singer, broadcaster and actor
- Emma Finucane (born 2002), cyclist
- Rhod Gilbert (born 1968), television host and comedian
- Rhodri Gomer-Davies (born 1983) rugby union Scarlets centre
- Gorky's Zygotic Mynci (formed 1991), folk/rock band
- Geraint Griffiths (born 1949), singer, songwriter and actor
- Elis James (born 1980), comedian
- Charles William Jones (1836–1908), Welsh politician and magistrate
- Stephen Jones (born 1977), Wales rugby captain
- Helen Lederer (born 1954), actress and comedian
- Manon Lloyd (born 1996), cyclist, Global Cycling Network (GCN) presenter
- Kate McGill (born 1990), singer/songwriter
- Daniel Mulloy (born 1977), screenwriter and director
- John Nash (1752–1835), architect living in Carmarthen from 1784
- Daniel Newton (born 1989), Scarlets Centre full back
- William Norton (1862–1898), Wales international rugby union player
- Joshua T. Owen (1822–1887), American military officer and politician
- Ken Owens (born 1987), rugby union Scarlets Centre hooker
- Elizabeth Popova (born 2006), rhythmic gymnast
- Adam Price (born 1968) Welsh politician, former leader of Plaid Cymru
- Rhys Priestland (born 1987), rugby union Scarlets fullback
- Iwan Rheon (born 1985), actor (famous for role in Game of Thrones) and singer/songwriter
- Byron Rogers (born 1942), journalist, historian and biographer
- Matthew Stevens (born 1977), snooker pro
- Nicky Stevens (born 1949), member of pop group Brotherhood of Man, European Song Contest winner
- Terence Thomas, Baron Thomas of Macclesfield (1937–2018), Labour Party (UK) politician and banker
- Nik Turner (1940–2022), jazz musician
- Tudur Aled (c. 1465–1525), poet buried in Carmarthen's Franciscan graveyard
- Philip Vaughan (died 1824), ironmaster and inventor of the ball bearing
- Mary Wynne Warner (1932–1998), mathematician
- John Weathers (born 1947), rock drummer
- Barry Williams (born 1974), British and Irish Lions rugby union hooker
- David Glyndwr Tudor Williams (1930–2009), first full-time Vice-Chancellor of the University of Cambridge
- Ifan Williams (1889–1957), violinist, conductor, and music educator
- Scott Williams, Scarlets Centre and Wales rugby union player

== Twin towns ==
Carmarthen is twinned with:

- Lesneven, Brittany, France
- Santa Marinella, Italy
- As Pontes, Galicia, Spain
