= St Peter's Church, Carmarthen =

Church in Carmarthenshire, Wales

Coordinates: 51.8580°N 4.3027°W

St Peter's Church
- Eglwys San Pedr
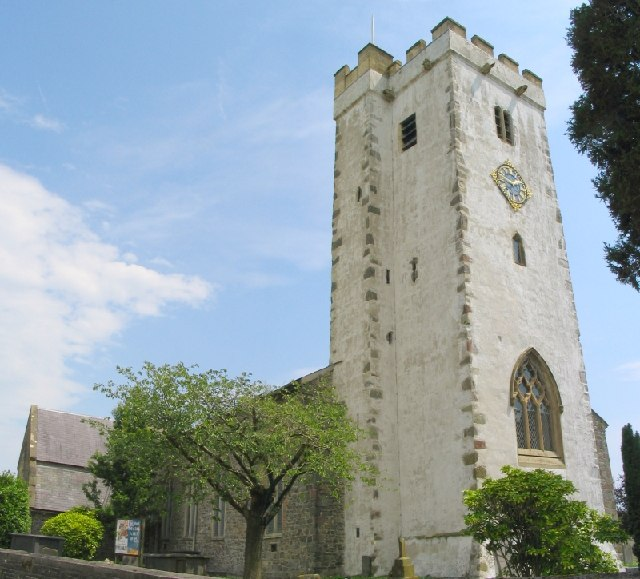
- St Peter's Church (2005)
- St Peter's Church
- Location: Carmarthen
- Country: Wales
- Denomination: Church in Wales
- Previous denomination: Roman Catholic
- Website: www.stpeterscarmarthen.org.uk

St Peter's Church (Welsh: Eglwys San Pedr) is the Church in Wales parish church for the town of Carmarthen, Wales. Though founded much earlier, the present building dates from at least the 14th century. It is the largest church in the Diocese of St Davids and is a Grade I listed building. It is also the oldest surviving building in Carmarthen.

== History ==
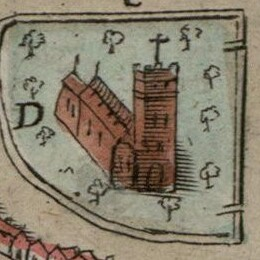
St Peter's Church, John Speed 1607

It is not known whether an older, pre-Norman church originally stood on the site, but St Peter's lies within the site of Roman Moridinum, inside the presumed west gate of the Roman walls. The church, if founded soon after the construction of the Norman castle, was located midway between the castle and the monastic settlement of Llandeulyddog, which is known to have existed before the Norman Conquest. Its location would have allowed it to serve the spiritual needs of both the Welsh community Old Carmarthen, and New Carmarthen which developed in the shadow of the castle.

St Peter's Church is recorded as being transferred to Battle Abbey between 1107 and 1124. The current church building probably dates from later than this, with the nave and chancel dating to the 13th or 14th century. The south aisle and north transept possibly date to the late 14th century. The tower was rebuilt a century after that and a porch added at the same time. The nave and chancel were raised and largely rebuilt during the 16th century.

During the Tudor dissolution of the 1500s, St Peter's became the property of the Crown. The Consistory Courts of the Chancellor of the Diocese of St Davids took place at the church and Bishop Robert Ferrar was tried here in 1555. In 1816 the church came under the patronage of St David's College, Lampeter until it passed into the ambit of the Bishop of St Davids in the early 1900s.

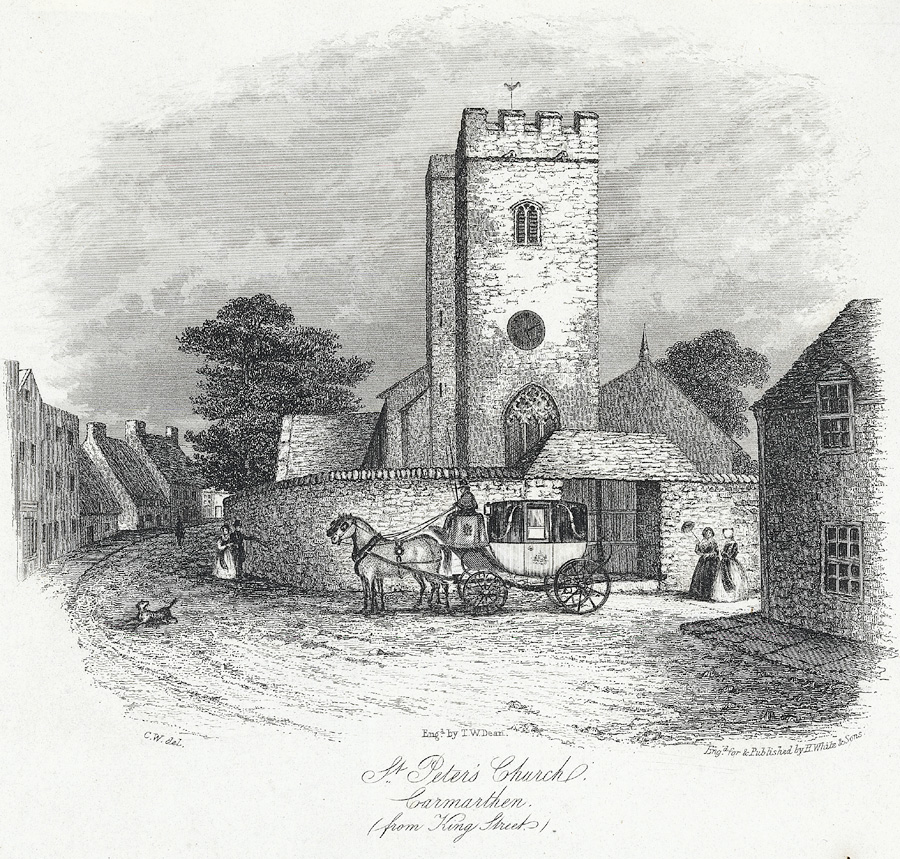
St Peter's Church c. 1860

One of the best-known people to be buried at St Peter's is the 18th-century satirist, Sir Richard Steele, who married a local woman, Mary Scurlock, and died in Carmarthen in 1729.

Until the 19th century, St Peter's was the only Anglican church in Carmarthen. This changed with the opening of St David's Church in the late 1830s. Repairs and restorations took place during the 19th century and the current clock, by E. V. Collier, was added to the tower in 1903/04.

In 1954 the church received a heritage listing as Grade I.

== Description ==
St Peter's is claimed to be the largest church in Wales and the longest nave in the diocese. The church walls are built from rubble stone with slate roofs. The "landmark" tower at the western end has a square stair turret to its northeast corner and was lime washed in 2001. Within the tower there are eight bells, four of which are the original bells cast by Abraham Rudhall of Gloucester in 1722. The south porch was converted into a war memorial chapel in 1969, its door replaced with a pointed window. The main entrance to the church is via the door at the base of the tower.

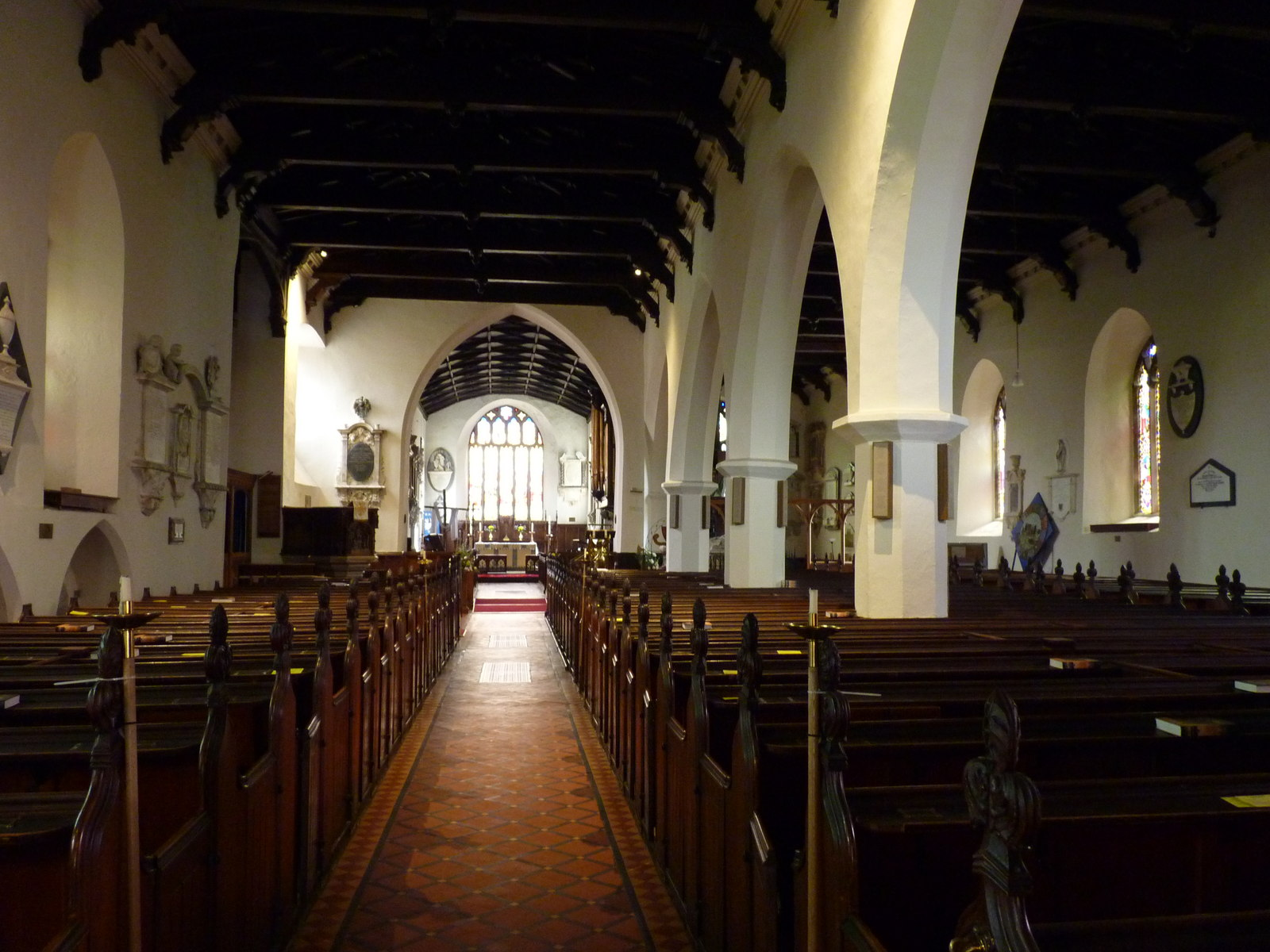
Looking east along the nave towards the chancel

The main body of the church consists of a long nave and chancel, separated from the south aisle by five arched bays. Altogether the interior is 170' (52 metres) in length from the west tower door to the east window of the chancel, with the nave and south aisle 50' (15 metres) in total width. The hammerbeam roofs were replaced by Buckingham Palace architect, John Nash, in 1785, but these were replaced again in 1861 as part of the mid-19th-century restorations. Many of the windows were replaced in 1846, or altered during the 1860s. The decorative floor tiling in the chancel and aisles dates from 1866/76 and is by Maw & Co.

There are a large number of important tombs and memorials inside the church. The tomb of Rhys ap Thomas, reputed to have made the fatal blow to King Richard III, is located inside the church.

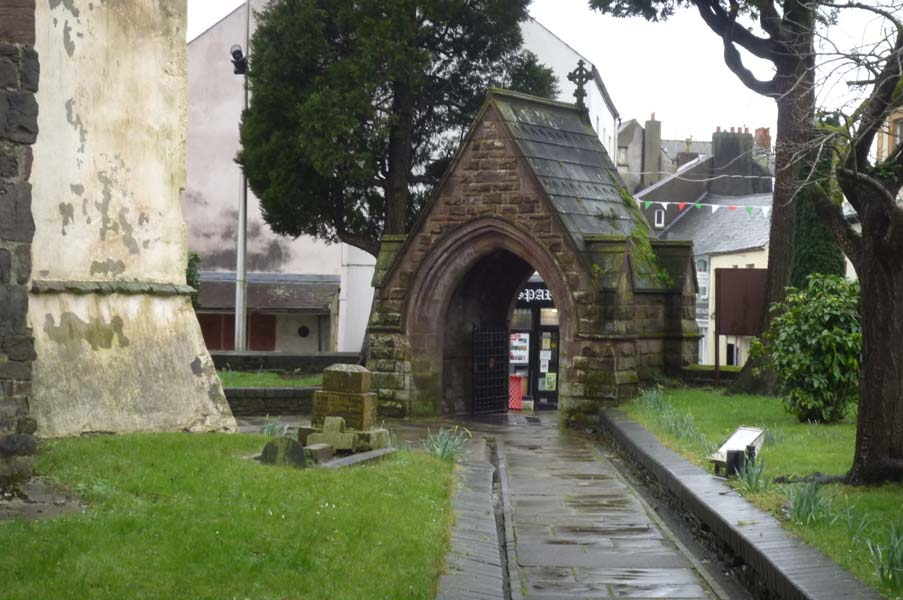
Lychgate viewed from the churchyard

The northwest entrance to the churchyard (in front of the church tower) is via a red sandstone neo-Gothic lychgate and a set of iron gates. The lychgate was designed by Francis E. Jones of London and built in 1879 in memory of the Reverend Latimer M. Jones, vicar of the parish 1863–77. The gate is Grade II listed.

== Closure threat ==
In 2014 the vicar, Reverend Leigh Richardson, announced that the church had very little financial reserves to draw on and, with running costs of £50,000 per year it was under threat of closure. The church had recently had to pay £20,000 to repair the main stained glass window after damage by vandalism. One possible source of additional visitors and income could be a display about the Black Book of Carmarthen.

In 2015 a fundraising concert was organised, with proceeds shared between the church and charities supported by the Welsh Guards.

== Legend ==
In its Historia Regum Britanniae, Geoffrey of Monmouth writes that Merlin's mother used to live with nuns in the church of St Peter in Carmarthen.

== Sources ==
- Lodwick, Joyce and Victor (1994). The Story of Carmarthen (third (updated) ed.). Carmarthen: St Peter's Press. ISBN 0-9517962-0-8.
