= Diocese of St Davids =

Diocese of the Church in Wales

Coordinates: 51.8819°N 5.2678°W

Diocese of St Davids Esgobaeth Tyddewi
- Coat of arms

- Flag

Location
- Ecclesiastical province: Wales
- Archdeaconries: St Davids, Cardigan, Carmarthen
- Headquarters: Diocesan Office, Abergwili, Carmarthen

Information
- Cathedral: St Davids Cathedral

Current leadership
- Bishop: Dorrien Davies, Bishop of St Davids
- Dean: Sarah Rowland Jones
- Archdeacons: Paul Mackness, Archdeacon of St Davids; Mones Farah, Archdeacon Missioner; Eileen Davies, Archdeacon of Cardigan; Matthew Hill, Archdeacon-designate of Carmarthen

Map
- Map of the diocese in the Church in Wales

Website
- stdavids.churchinwales.org.uk

The Diocese of St Davids is a diocese of the Church in Wales, a church of the Anglican Communion. The diocese covers the historic extent of Ceredigion, Carmarthenshire and Pembrokeshire, together with a small part of western Glamorgan. The episcopal see is the Cathedral Church of St David in the City of St Davids, Pembrokeshire. The present cathedral, which was begun in 1181, stands on the site of a monastery founded in the 6th century by Saint David.

The diocese is divided into the three archdeaconries of St Davids, Carmarthen and Cardigan (additionally, Mones Farah serves as Archdeacon Missioner). The bishop's residence is Llys Esgob in Abergwili, Carmarthenshire.

== History ==
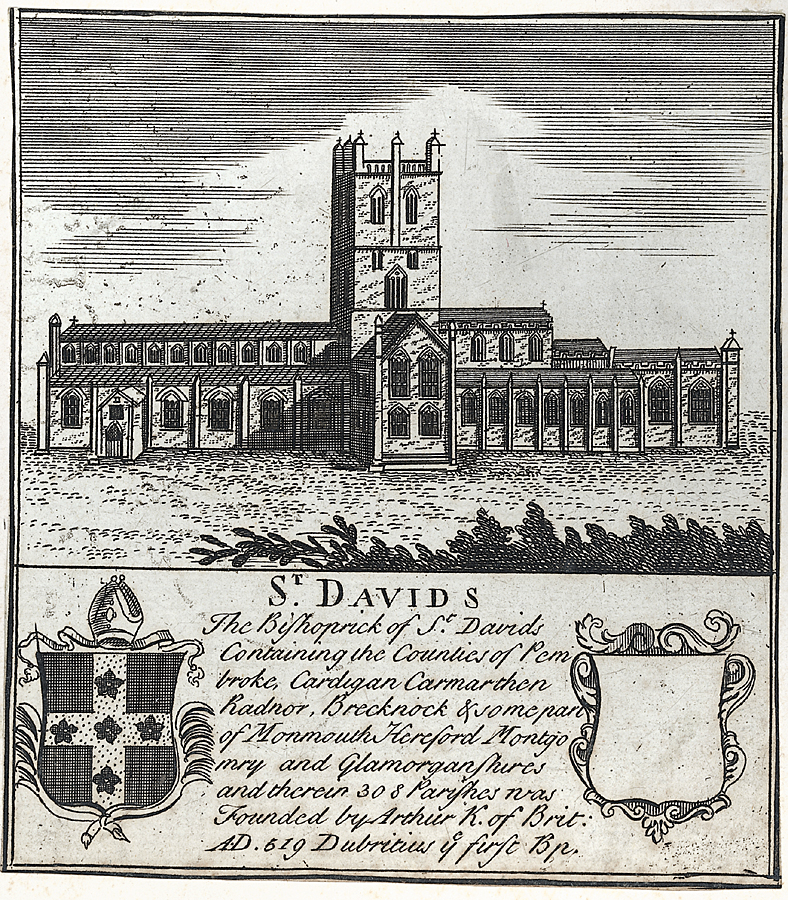
An engraving of St David's Cathedral c.1790 with an account of its history

The history of the diocese of St Davids is traditionally traced to that saint (Dewi) in the latter half of the 6th century. Records of the history of the diocese before Norman times are very fragmentary, however, consisting of a few chance references in old chronicles, such as Annales Cambriae and Brut y Tywysogion (Rolls Series).

Originally corresponding with the boundaries of Dyfed (Demetia), St Davids eventually comprised all the country south of the River Dyfi and west of the English border, with the exception of the greater part of Glamorganshire, in all some 3,500 square miles (9,100 km^{2}). Until 1852 the diocese also included some parishes in Herefordshire.

The diocese assumed its current extent in 1923, when the Diocese of Swansea and Brecon was created from the eastern part of the diocese.

The office of Bishop of St Davids has existed since the founding of the cathedral. The See was led in 2016-2023 by Joanna Penberthy, who was the first woman ordained a bishop in the Church in Wales. On 17 October 2023, Dorrien Davies, Archdeacon of Carmarthen, was elected to become the next Bishop; the confirmation of his election (by which he legally became Bishop) was on 29 November and his episcopal consecration took place on 27 January 2024 at Bangor Cathedral.

In 2019 the diocese began to reorganise its churches into 23 Ministry Areas, plus the Cathedral. This process was completed in 2021 and the ministry areas are now coterminous with the deaneries.

== Archdeaconries and deaneries ==
Archdeaconry	Deanery/mission area	Churches	Population	People/church
Cardigan	Aberystwyth	5	14,581	2,916
Cardigan	Bro Aeron Mydr	12	5,379	448
Cardigan	Bro Padarn	14	17,003	1,215
Cardigan	Bro Teifi	18	16,698	928
Cardigan	Bro Wyre	8	4,403	550
Cardigan	Dyffryn Teifi	17	13,695	806
Cardigan	Glyn Aeron	10	8,181	818
Cardigan	Lampeter	22	14,120	642
Carmarthen	Bro Aman	11	28,464	2,588
Carmarthen	Bro Caerfyrddin	11	20,755	1,887
Carmarthen	Bro Cydweli	10	11,262	1,126
Carmarthen	Bro Dinefwr	11	4,863	442
Carmarthen	Bro Dyfri	18	9,119	507
Carmarthen	Bro Gwendraeth	14	35,641	2,546
Carmarthen	Bro Lliedi	6	50,258	8,376
Carmarthen	Bro Sancler	11	8,400	764
St Davids	Daugleddau	13	20,319	1,563
St Davids	East Landsker	14	8,513	608
St Davids	Greater Dewisland	13	5,527	425
St Davids	Narberth and Tenby	19	21,978	1,157
St Davids	Roose	22	27,896	1,268
St Davids	South West Pembrokeshire	14	22,385	1,599
St Davids	The Cathedral	1	1,841	1,841
St Davids	West Cemaes	17	11,616	683
Total/average		317	387,550	1,223

On 12 August 2018, Mones Farah was collated as an extra archdeacon without a territorial archdeaconry: the Archdeacon for New Church Communities; on 1 March 2024, he was re-licensed with the new title "Archdeacon Missioner".

Mones Anton Farah (born 1964) is a Palestinian-born Anglican priest. He trained for the ministry at Trinity College, Bristol before receiving ordination in the Church in Wales: he was deaconed on 26 June 1988 and priested on 25 June 1989. Farah served his title as assistant curate at Aberystwyth before becoming Chaplain to the University of Wales, Lampeter in 1991. He moved to England in 1998 to become a Team Vicar in Great Baddow, returning to Aberystwyth in 2014 as priest-in-charge. Alongside his current role as archdeacon, he is also a Canon of St Davids Cathedral.

== List of churches ==
=== Archdeaconry of Cardigan ===
==== Aberystwyth Ministry Area ====
This was formed by the union of the parishes of Aberystwyth Holy Trinity, Aberystwyth St Anne, Aberystwyth St Mary, Aberystwyth St Michael and Llanychaearn. It is named after Aberystwyth. It has an estimated population of 12,795. As of September 2024 it was served by three Priests in Charge and one Assistant Curate.

Church	Founded (building)
St Michael & All Angels, Aberystwyth	C15th (1787) (1832) (1890)
Holy Trinity, Aberystwyth	1886
St Anne, Penparcau	1910
St Mary, Aberystwyth	1866
St Hychan, Llanychaearn	APC (1878)

==== Bro Aeron Mydr Ministry Area ====
This was formed by the union of the parishes of Capel Cynon, Cilcennin, Ciliau Aeron, Cribyn, Dihewyd, Gwenlli, Llanarth St David, Llanarth St Teilo, Llanerch Aeron, Llanfihangel Ystrad, Mydroilyn, Talgarreg and Trefilan. It is named after the River Aeron and its tributary the Afon Mydr. It has an estimated population of 5,321. As of September 2024 it was served by one Priest in Charge.

Church	Founded (building)	
St Cynon, Capel Cynon	MC (1820)	
St David, Llanarth	APC	
St David, Talgarreg	1899	
St Mark, Gwenlli	1897	
St Non, Llanerch Aeron	APC (1798)	
St Vitalis, Dihewyd	APC (1828)	
Holy Trinity, Mydroilyn	1890 (1991)	
St Michael, Ciliau Aeron	APC (C18th)	
St Michael, Llanfihangel Ystrad	APC (1878)	
St Silin, Cribyn	1894	
St Hilary, Trefilan^{2}	APC (1882)	
Holy Trinity, Cilcennin^{1}	APC/MC (early C19th)	
Former churches	Founded (build)	Closed
St Cynllo, Nantcwnlle	APC (C19th?)	

^{1}original dedication to St Cannen ^{2}original dedication to St Mary

==== Bro Padarn Ministry Area ====
This was formed by the union of the parishes of Borth, Capel Bangor, Comins Coch, Eglwysfach, Eglwys Newydd, Elerch, Llanafan-Y-Trawscoed, Llanbadarn Fawr, Llandre, Llanfihangel-Y-Creuddyn, Llangynfelyn, Llantrisant, Penrhyncoch, Pontarfynach, Ponterwyd, Ysbyty Cynfyn and Ysbyty Ystwyth. It is named after St Padarn, to whom the church of Llanbadarn Fawr is dedicated. It has an estimated population of 15,503. As of September 2024 it was served by two Priests in Charge, one Associate Priest/Focal Minister and one Active Retired Non-Stipendiary Minister.

Church	Founded (building)	
St Matthew, Borth	1879	
St Michael, Eglwysfach	c. 1623 (1833)	
St Michael, Hafod, Eglwys Newydd	1620 (1803)	
St Afan, Llanafan	APC (1860)	
St Michael, Llanfihangel y Creuddyn	APC	
St John the Baptist, Ysbyty Cynfyn	MC (1827)	
SS David, Teilo & Padarn, Llantrisant	MC (C19th)	
St Padarn, Llanbadarn Fawr	APC	
St David, Capel Bangor	1839	
St Peter, Elerch	1868	
St John the Divine, Penrhyncoch	1882	
St Michael, Llanfihangel-Genau'r-Glyn	APC (1885)	
All Saints, Llangorwen	1841	
Former churches	Founded (build)	Closed
St Cynfelyn, Llangynfelyn	APC	
St Matthew, Goginan	1871	pre-2011
St Iago, Pontarfynach	1896	pre-2012
St David, Talybont	1909	2017
(Old) St John the Baptist, Ysbyty Ystwyth	APC (c. 1825)	c. 2020
(New) St John the Baptist, Ysbyty Ystwyth	1876	2007

==== Bro Teifi Ministry Area ====
This was formed by the union of the parishes of Aber-Porth, Blaenporth, Bridell, Capel Colman, Cardigan, Castellan, Cilgerran, Eglwyswrw, Llandygwydd, Llanfair Nant-Gwyn, Llanfihangel Penbedw, Llangoedmor, Llechryd, Maenordeifi, Monington, Mwnt, Nevern, Penrhydd, St Dogmael's and Y Ferwig. It is named after the River Teifi. It has an estimated population of 16,468. As of September 2024 it was served by two Priests in Charge and two Associate Priests.

Church	Founded (building)	
St Cynwyl, Aberporth	APC (1857)	
St David, Blaenporth	APC (1859)	
St John, Betws Ifan	APC (1870)	
St Cristiolus, Eglwyswrw	APC (1829)	
St David, Bridell	APC (1887)	
St Llawddog, Cilgerran	APC (1855)	
St Mary, Llanfair Nant-Gwyn	APC (1855)	
St Tygwydd, Llandygwydd^{2}	APC (1857)	
St Tydfil, Llechryd	1878	
St Colman, Capel Colman	MC (1837)	
St David, Carreg-wen, Manordeifi	1898	
St Mary, Cardigan	APC	
St Cynllo, Llangoedmor	APC (1832)	
Holy Cross, Y Mwnt	MC	
St Pedrog, Y Ferwig	APC (1854)	
St Nicholas, Monington	APC (1860)	
St Thomas the Martyr, St Dogmaels^{3}	APC (1847)	
St Brynach, Nevern	APC	
Former churches	Founded (build)	Closed
St Andrew, Bayvil	APC (early C19th)	pre-1983
Holy Cross, Llechryd	APC	c. 1994
St Michael, Tremain	APC (1848)	2008
Old St David's, Manordeifi^{1}	APC	1899
St Dogfael, Meline	APC (1865)	2017
SS Mynno, David & Andrew, Moylegrove^{4}	APC (1866)	C21st
St Michael, Whitechurch	APC (1873)	1999
St Michael, Llanfihangel Penbedw	APC	late C20th
St Illtyd, Llantood	APC (1883)	
Capel Tygwydd Mission Church	1890	C20th
St Mary, Cilgwyn	MC	C20th/21st

^{1}original dedication to St Llawddog ^{2}church demolished 2000, services continue in a converted schoolroom. 3original dedication to St Dogmael, then St Mary ^{4}original dedication to St Andrew

==== Bro Wyre Ministry Area ====
This was formed by the union of the parishes of Llanddeiniol, Llanfihangel Lledrod, Llangwyryfon, Llanilar, Llanrhystud, Llansantffraed, Llanwnnws, Nebo and Rhostie. It is named after the Afon Wyre. It has an estimated population of 5,125. As of September 2024 it was served by one Priest in Charge.

Church	Founded (building)	
St Deiniol, Llanddeiniol	APC (1835)	
St Rhystyd, Llanrhystyd	APC (1854)	
St David, Nebo	c. 1913	
St Bridget, Llansantffraed	APC	
St Gwnnws, Llanwnnws	APC	
St Michael, Llanfihangel Lledrod	APC (1827)	
St Ursula, Llangwyryfon	APC (1880)	
St Hilary, Llanilar	APC	
Former churches	Founded (build)	Closed
St Michael, Llanfihangel Rhostie	APC (1882)	

==== Dyffryn Teifi Ministry Area ====
This was formed by the union of the parishes of Bangor Teifi, Capel Dewi, Capel Mair, Cenarth, Felindre, Llandyfriog, Llandysul, Llanfihangel-ar-Arth, Llangeler, Llangynllo, Newcastle Emlyn, Pen-Boyr, Pencader, Pontsian, Rhos, Tregroes and Troedyraur. It is named after the valley of the River Teifi. It has an estimated population of 13,728. As of September 2024 it was served by three Priests in Charge.

Church	Founded (building)	
St David, Bangor Teifi	APC (1932)	
St Ffraid, Llanfraed, Tregroes	MC (1858)	
St John, Pontsian	1885	
St Tysul, Llandysul	APC	
St Cynllo, Llangynllo	APC (1870)	
St Mary, Pencader	MC (1881)	
St Michael, Llanfihangel-ar-Arth	APC	
St David, Capel Dewi	MC (1835)	
St Mary, Bancyffordd	1899	
St Celer, Llangeler	APC (1858)	
St James, Rhos	1903	
St Barnabas, Felindre	1862	
St Llawddog, Penboyr	APC (1809)	
St Tyfriog, Llandyfriog	APC (1888)	
Holy Trinity, Newcastle Emlyn	1842	
St Michael, Troedyraur, Brongest	APC (1851)	
St Llawddog, Cenarth	APC (1872)	
Former churches	Founded (build)	Closed
St David, Henllan	APC (c. 1849)	
St Mary, Llanfair Orllwyn	APC (c. 1820)	
St Mary, Llanfair Treflygen	APC	c. 1800
St Mary, Brongwyn	APC	
St Teilo, Cilrhedyn	APC (C19th)	C20th
St Silfed/Sylvester, Llandyssulfed, Pontsian	MC	C18th

==== Glyn Aeron Ministry Area ====
This was formed by the union of the parishes of Aberaeron, Cross Inn, Henfynyw, Llanbadarn Trefeglwys, Llanddewi Aberarth, Llandysiliogogo, Llangrannog, Llanina, Newquay and Penbryn. It is named after the valley of the River Aeron. It has an estimated population of 7,734. As of September 2024 it was served by two Priests in Charge, one Associate Priest and one Curate.

Church	Founded (building)	
St Padarn, Llanbadarn Trefeglwys	APC (1650)	
Holy Trinity, Aberaeron	1835 (1872)	
St David, Henfynyw	APC (1866)	
St David, Llanddewi Aberarth	APC (1862)	
St Tysilio, Llandysiliogogo	APC (1825)	
St Carannog, Llangrannog	APC (1884)	
St Michael, Penbryn	APC	
St Llwchaiarn, Llanllwchaiarn, Newquay	APC (1865)	
Holy Trinity, Cross Inn	1871	
St Ina, Llanina	MC (c. 1810)	
Former churches	Founded (build)	Closed
St David, Blaencelyn	1894	2002
St John, Sarnau	1889	pre-1984

==== Lampeter Ministry Area ====
This was formed by the union of the parishes of Betws Bledrws, Betws Leucu, Blaenpennal, Cellan, Cwmann, Gartheli, Lampeter, Llanbadarn Odwyn, Llanddewi Brefi, Llanfair Clydogau, Llangeitho, Llangybi, Llanllwni, Llanwenog, Llanwnnen, Llanybydder, Llanycrwys, Maestir, Pencarreg, Pontrhydfendigaid, Silian, Strata Florida, Tregaron and Ystrad Meurig. It is named after Lampeter, the principal town. It has an estimated population of 13,668. As of September 2024 it was served by three Priests in Charge and two Associate Priests.

Church	Founded (building)	
St Bledrws, Betws Bledrws	APC (1831)	
St Peter, Lampeter	APC (1870)	
St Mary, Maestir	1880	
St Cybi, Llangybi	APC	
St Lucia, Betws Leucu	MC (1875)	
St Gartheli, Gartheli	MC (1875)	
St Ceitho, Llangeitho	APC (1821)	
All Saints, Cellan^{4}	APC	
St David, Llanddewi Brefi	APC	
St Padarn, Llanbadarn Odwyn	APC	
St Mary, Llanfair Clydogau	APC	
St Gwenog, Llanwenog	APC	
St Luke, Maesycrugiau, Llanllwni^{1}	APC	
St Peter, Llanybydder	APC	
St Lucia, Llanwnnen^{3}	APC	
St David, Llanycrwys	APC	
St James, Cwmann	1890	
St Patrick, Pencarreg^{2}	APC	
St Mary, Strata Florida	C16th (1815)	
St Caron, Tregaron	APC	
St John the Baptist, Ystrad Meurig	APC (1898)	
St David, Blaenpenal	MC (1903)	
Former churches	Founded (build)	Closed
St David, Pontrhydfendigaid	1900	2017
St Sulien, Silian	APC (1873)	

^{1}original dedication to St Llonio ^{2}original dedication to St Michael ^{3}original dedication to St Gwynin or Gwnnen ^{4}original dedication to St Callwen

=== Archdeaconry of Carmarthen ===
==== Bro Aman Ministry Area ====
This was formed by the union of the parishes of Ammanford All Saints, Ammanford St Michael, Betws, Brynaman, Cwmaman, Cwm-Coch, Cwmllynfell, Llandybie, Llandyfan, Pont Aman and Tai'rgwaith. It is named after the River Amman. It has an estimated population of 28,888. As of September 2024 it was served by two Priests in Charge and one Assistant Curate.

Church	Founded (building)	
All Saints', Ammanford	1915	
St David, Betws, Ammanford	APC	
St Michael, Ammanford	1882 (1885)	
St Catherine, Brynaman	1878 (1881)	
St Margaret, Cwmllynfell	1905	
Christ Church, Garnant, Cwmaman	1842	
St Mary, Cwmgors, Gwauncaegurwen	1886	
St Dyfan, Llandyfan	MC (1865)	
St Mark, Cwm-Coch	?	
St Tybie, Llandybie	APC	
Former churches	Founded (build)	Closed
St David, Tairgwaith	1913	2010s
St Margaret, Glanaman	1907 (1933)	2008
St Thomas, Pontaman	1890 (1995)	c. 2020
St John, Tirydail	1911	1974

==== Bro Caerfyrddin Ministry Area ====
This was formed by the union of the parishes of Abergwili, Bronwydd, Capel y Groes, Carmarthen Christ Church, Carmarthen St John, Carmarthen St Peter, Cwmduad, Cynwyl Elfed, Llangynnwr, Llanllawddog, Llanpumsaint and Llannewydd. It is named after Carmarthen. It has an estimated population of 22,021. As of September 2024 it was served by two Priests in Charge and one Assistant Curate.

Church	Founded (building)	
St Peter, Carmarthen	APC	
St David, Abergwili	APC (1843)	
Christ Church, Carmarthen	1869	
St Cynwyl, Cynwyl Elfed	APC	
St Michael, Llannewydd	APC (1829)	
St Cynyr, Llangunnor	APC	
St Llawddog, Llanllawddog	MC (1849)	
Five Saints, Llanpumsaint^{1}	MC	
St Celynnin, Bronwydd	1894	
Former churches	Founded (build)	Closed
St John the Evangelist, Carmarthen	1890	c. 2020
St Alban's Mission Church, Cwmduad	?	c. 2021
St David, Carmarthen	1837	2003
St Mary, Carmarthen	APC	C16th/17th
St Michael, Llanfihangel Croesfeini	MC	C19th
Holy Cross, Peniel	C19th (1887)	2012

^{1}dedication to SS Celynin, Ceitho, Gwyn, Gwyno, and Gwynoro

==== Bro Cydweli Ministry Area ====
This was formed by the union of the parishes of Cwmffrwd, Cydweli St Mary, Cydweli St Teilo, Ferryside, Llanarthne, Llanddarog, Llandyfaelog, Llangyndeyrn, Llansaint and St Ishmael's. It is named after Kidwelly, the principal town. It has an estimated population of 9,213. As of September 2024 it was served by two Priests in Charge.

Church	Founded (building)
St Anne, Cwmffrwd	1866
St Twrog, Llanddarog	APC (1860)
St Arthen, Llanarthney	APC
St Mary, Kidwelly	APC
St Teilo, Mynyddygarreg	c. 1890
St Maelog, Llandyfaelog	APC
All Saints, Llansaint	MC
St Ishmael, St Ishmaels	APC
St Thomas, Ferryside	1828 (1876)
St Cyndeyrn, Llangyndeyrn	APC

==== Bro Dinefwr Ministry Area ====
This was formed by the union of the parishes of Brechfa, Carmel, Cwrt-Henri, Felin-Gwm, Llandeilo Fawr, Llanegwad, Llanfihangel Aberbythych, Llanfihangel Rhos-Y-Corn, Llanfihangel-Uwch-Gwili, Llanfynydd, Llangathen, Maesteilo, Pontargothi and Taliaris. (Llandeilo, Maesteilo and Taliaris were originally part of a separate grouping and joined the Ministry Area later.) It is named after Dinefwr Castle. It has an estimated population of 7,152. As of September 2024 it was served by two Priests in Charge and two Assistant Curates.

Church	Founded (building)	
St Teilo, Brechfa	APC (1893)	
St Michael, Llanfihangel Rhos-y-corn	APC	
St Egwad, Llanfynydd	APC	
St Cathen, Llangathen	APC	
St Mary, Cwrt-Henri^{1}	1832	
St Michael, Llanfihangel Aberbythych / Golden Grove	APC (1850)	
St Mary's Memorial Church, Carmel	C19th???	
St John the Evangelist, Felin-gwm	1896	
Holy Trinity, Pontargothi	1865	
St Egwad, Llanegwad	APC (1849)	
St Michael, Llanfihangel-Uwch-Gwili	MC	
Holy Trinity, Taliaris	C17th (1892)	
St John, Maesteilo	1903	
St Teilo, Llandeilo	APC (1851)	
Former churches	Founded (build)	Closed
St Tyfei, Llandyfeisant	APC (C19th)	1960s
St Michael, Llanfihangel Cilfargen	APC (1822)	

^{1}originally a private church and transferred to the Church in Wales in the 1930s

==== Bro Dyfri Ministry Area ====
This was formed by the union of the parishes of Abergorlech, Capel Dewi Sant, Cilycwm, Cynwyl Gaeo, Gwynfe, Llanddeusant, Llandingat, Llanfair (?), Llanfair-Ar-Y-Bryn, Llangadog, Llansadwrn, Llansawel, Llanwrda, Manordeilo, Myddfai, Rhandirmwyn, Talley and Ystrad-Ffin. It is named after Llandovery, the principal town. It has an estimated population of 8,518. As of September 2024 it was served by two Priests in Charge and two Associate Priests.

Church	Founded (building)	
St Michael, Cilycwm	APC	
St Mary, Cynghordy, Llanfair-ar-y-bryn	1883	
St Barnabas, Rhandirmwyn	1877	
St Paulinus, Ystrad Ffin	MC (1821)	
St David, Abergorlech	MC (1834)	
St Sawyl, Llansawel	APC	
St Cynwyl, Cynwyl Caio	APC	
St Michael, Talley	c. 1550 (1772)	
St Dingat, Llandovery	APC	
St Mary, Llanfair-ar-y-bryn	APC	
St Michael, Myddfai	APC	
St Cwrdaf, Llanwrda	APC (1812)	
St Sadwrn, Llansadwrn	APC	
St Paul, Cwmifor	1854	
All Saints, Capel Gwynfe	MC (1899)	
SS Simon & Jude, Llanddeusant^{1}	APC	
St Cadog, Llangadog	APC	
Former churches	Founded (build)	Closed
St David's Chapel, Llanwrda	1904	c. 2020

^{1}original dedication to SS Potolius & Notolius

==== Bro Glannau Tywyn Ministry Area ====
This was formed by the union of the parishes of Burry Port, Llandyry, Pen-Bre and Pwll. These parishes were originally part of Bro Gwendraeth but split off in. It is named after. It has an estimated population of. As of September 2024 it was served by two Priests in Charge.

Church	Founded (building)
St Mary, Burry Port	1877
St Illtyd, Pembrey	APC
Llandyry Parish Church	MC
Holy Trinity, Pwll	1903

==== Bro Gwendraeth Ministry Area ====
This was formed by the union of the parishes of Capel Ifan, Cross Hands, Gors-Las, Llanedi, Llannon, Pont-Iets, Pontyberem, Saron, Tumble and Tycroes. It is named after the River Gwendraeth. It has an estimated population, together with Bro Glannau Tywyn (which split off later) of 43,785. As of September 2024 it was served by one Priest in Charge and two Associate Priests.

Church	Founded (building)	
St David, Tumble^{1}	1888 (1927)	
St Anne, Cross Hands	1939	
St David, Saron	c. 1911	
St Edi or Edith, Llanedi	APC (c. 1800)	
St Edmund, Tycroes	1914	
St John, Capel Ifan / Pontyberem	MC (1894)	
St Lleian, Gorslas	1879	
St Mary, Pontyates	1911	
St Non, Llannon	APC	
Former churches	Founded (build)	Closed
St David, Hendy, Pontarddulais	C19th (1980)	

^{1}original dedication to St Sulien

==== Bro Lliedi Ministry Area ====
This was formed by the union of the parishes of Dafen, Felin-Foel, Hendy, Llanelli St Elli, Llanelli St Peter, Llangennech and Llwynhendy. It is named after the River Lliedi. It has an estimated population of 47,843. As of September 2024 it was served by one Priest in Charge and one Associate Priest.

Church	Founded (building)	
St Ellyw, Llanelli	APC	
St Peter, Llanelli	1869	
St David, Llwynhendy	1882	
St Cennych or Gwynog, Llangennech	APC (1908)	
St Michael & All Angels, Dafen	1874	
Holy Trinity, Felinfoel	1857	
Former churches	Founded (build)	Closed
All Saints, Llanelli	1872	2011
St Alban, Llanelli	1915	2011
St Paul, Llanelli	1851	1980s
Christ Church, Llanelli	1887	
St John, Llanelli	1887	c. 2010
St David, Llanelli	1892	C20th
St Barnabas, Llanelli	1872	1976

==== Bro Sancler Ministry Area ====
This was formed by the union of the parishes of Abernant, Laugharne, Llanboidy, Llanddowror, Llanfihangel Abercywyn, Llangynin, Llangynog, Llan-Llwch, Llansteffan, Meidrim, Merthyr, St Clears and Tre-Lech A'r Betws. It is named after St Clears. It has an estimated population of 9,101. As of September 2024 it was served by three Priests in Charge, one Associate Priest and one Assistant Curate.

Church	Founded (building)	
St Cynin, Llangynin	APC	
St Cynog, Llangynog	APC	
St David, Meidrim	APC	
St Lucia, Abernant	APC	
St Martin, Laugharne	APC^{1}	
St Martin, Merthyr	APC (1873)	
St Mary, Llanllwch	MC (1710)	
St Mary Magdalene, St Clears	APC	
(New) St Michael, Llanfihangel Abercywyn	1848	
St Sadwrnen, Llansadwrnen	APC (1859)	
St Stephen, Llansteffan	APC	
St Teilo, Llanddowror	APC	
St Teilo, Trelech a'r Betws	APC (1835)	
Former churches	Founded (build)	Closed
St Odoceus, Llandawke	APC	2006
St Teilo, Llandeilo Abercywyn	APC	1950s
(Old) St Michael, Llanfihangel Abercywyn	APC	1848
St Mary, Llanybri	MC	C18th
Holy Trinity, Llanybri	1851	2013
St Cain or Keyne, Llangain	APC (1871)	2017

^{1}original dedication to St Michael

=== Archdeaconry of St Davids ===
==== Daugleddau Ministry Area ====
This was formed by the union of the parishes of Ambleston, Bletherston, Camrose, Haverfordwest St Martin, Haverfordwest St Mary, Llawhaden, Prendergast, Rudbaxton, Spittal, St Dogwells, Trefgarn, Uzmaston, Walton East and Wiston. It is named after the River Cleddau. It has an estimated population of 21,119. As of September 2024 it was served by four Priests in Charge, one Pioneer Priest and one Active Retired Non-Stipendiary Minister.

Church	Founded (building)	
St Ismael, Camrose	APC	
St Martin of Tours, Haverfordwest	APC	
St Mary the Virgin, Haverfordwest	APC	
St Ishmael, Uzmaston	APC (1873)	
St Aidan, Llawhaden	APC	
St Mary, Bletherston	APC	
St Mary, Walton East	APC (C19th)	
St Mary Magdalene, Wiston	APC	
St David, Prendergast, Haverfordwest	APC (1868)	
St Michael, Rudbaxton	APC	
St Mary, Spittal	APC	
Former churches	Founded (build)	Closed
St Thomas a Becket, Haverfordwest	APC	2012
St Dogfael, St Dogwells, Sealyham	APC	c. 2020
St Michael, Treffgarne	APC (1881)	c. 2020
St Ishmael, Boulston	APC (1843)	1950s
(Old) St John the Baptist, Slebech	APC	early C19th
(New) St John the Baptist, Slebech	1840	1990
St Non, Llanycefn	APC	C21st
St Mary, Ambleston	APC	c. 2013
St Ishmael, Lambston	APC	
St Martin of Tours, Clarbeston	APC	
St Issell, Haroldston St Issells	APC	

==== East Landsker Ministry Area ====
This was formed by the union of the parishes of Clunderwen, Clydau, Cyffig, Eglwys Gymyn, Lampeter Velfrey, Llanboidy, Llanddewi Velfrey, Llandysilio, Llanfyrnach, Llanglydwen, Llanmiloe, Llanwinio, Mynachlogddu, Narberth St Catherine and Whitland. It is named after the Landsker Line. It has an estimated population of 11,217. As of September 2024 it was served by five Priests in Charge.

Church	Founded (building)	
St Cyffig, Cyffig	APC	
St Brynach, Llanboidy	APC	
St Brynach, Llanfyrnach	APC (1842)	
St Catherine, Princes Gate	1888	
St Clydwen, Llanglydwen	APC	
St Clydai, Clydey	APC	
St David, Clunderwen	1860	
St David, Llanddewi Velfrey	APC	
St Dogmael, Llandre, Mynachlogddu	APC	
St Gwynno, Llanwinio	APC (1845)	
St Margaret Marloes, Eglwyscummin	APC	
St Margaret (Marloes), Pendine	APC	
St Mary, Whitland	1853	
St Peter, Lampeter Velfrey	APC	
St Tysilio, Llandysilio	APC	
Former churches	Founded (build)	Closed
Castelldwyran Church	MC (1856)	C20th
St Canna, Llangan	APC (1820)	?
St Cristiolus, Penrydd	APC	C20th
St David, Henllan Amgoed	APC	2010
St Mallteg, Llanfallteg West	APC	pre-1998
SS Mary & Curig, Llanboidy	MC (C18th)	
St Michael, Llandre-Egremont	APC (1839)	C20th
SS Philip & James, Cilymaenllwyd	APC (1843)	2007
St Barbara, Llanmiloe	c. 1930s	c. 2015
Capel Castellan	MC	C17th

==== Greater Dewisland Ministry Area ====
This was formed in 2017 by the union of the parishes of Brawdy, Grandston, Hayscastle, Jordanston, Llanhywel, Llanrhian, Mathry, Nolton, Roch, Solva, St Elvis, St Lawrence, St Nicholas and Whitchurch. It is named after the historical area of Dewisland. It has an estimated population of 5,747. As of September 2024 it was served by three Priests in Charge and three Associate Priests.

Church	Founded (building)	
St David, Brawdy	APC	
St Hywel, Llanhowel	APC	
St Aidan, Solva	1879	
St David, Whitchurch	APC	
St Mary, Hayscastle	APC	
St Madoc, Nolton	APC	
St Mary, Roch	APC	
St Lawrence, St Lawrence/Welsh Hook	APC	
St Catherine, Granston	APC (1877)	
St Nicholas, St Nicholas	APC	
St Cawrda, Jordanston	APC (1797)	
Holy Martyrs, Mathry	APC (1869)	
St Rhian, Llanrhian	APC (1836)	
Former churches	Founded (build)	Closed
St Margaret, Ford	1627	c. 2010
St Teilo, Llandeloy	APC (1927)	2002
St Edrin, Llanedren	APC (1846)	1987
St Reithan, Llanrheithan	APC (1858)	C20th/21st
St Elvis, St Elvis	APC	c. 1900

==== Narberth and Tenby Ministry Area ====
This was formed by the union of the parishes of Amroth, Begelly, Gumfreston, Jeffreyston, Lawrenny, Loveston, Ludchurch, Manorbier, Minwear, Narberth St Andrew, New Hedges, Penally, Reynoldston, Robeston Wathen, St Florence, St Issell's, Templeton, Tenby St Julian, Tenby St Mary and East Williamston. It is named after Narberth and Tenby, the two major towns. It has an estimated population of 21,599. As of September 2024 it was served by three Priests in Charge, one Assistant Curate and one Active Retired Non-Stipendiary Minister.

Church	Founded (building)	
St Elidyr, East Williamston	MC (1880s)	
St James the Great, Manorbier	APC	
SS Nicholas & Teilo, Penally^{1}	APC	
St Florentius, St Florence	APC	
St Mary, Begelly	APC	
St Elidyr, Ludchurch	APC	
St Caradog, Lawrenny	APC	
St James, Reynalton	APC	
SS Jeffrey & Oswald, Jeffreston	APC	
St Womar, Minwear	APC	
St Leonard, Loveston	APC	
Robeston Wathen Parish Church	APC (1875)	
St Andrew, Narberth	APC	
St John, Templeton	1862	
St Elidyr, Amroth	APC	
St Mary, Tenby	APC	
St Anne, New Hedges	1854 (1928)	
St Julian's Chapel, Tenby	MC (1878)	
Former churches	Founded (build)	Closed
St Issell or Usyllt, St Issells	APC	c. 2021
St Lawrence, Gumfreston	APC	2020
St Lawrence, Marros	APC	C21st
St Teilo, Crinow	APC	C21st
Newton North Parish Church	APC	C19th
St Marcellus, Martletwy	APC	2011
St Mary, Coedcanlas	APC (C17th)	C19th?
St Elidyr, Crunwere	APC	C21st
St Michael, Mounton	APC	1948
St Lawrence, Yerbeston	APC	

^{1}original dedication to St Nicholas

==== Roose Ministry Area ====
This was formed by the union of the parishes of Burton, Dale, Freystrop, Hakin, Haroldston West, Herbrandston, Hubberston Holy Spirit, Hubberston St David, Johnston, Llangwm, Llanstadwel, Marloes, Milford Haven St Katherine, Milford Haven St Peter, Neyland, Robeston West, Rosemarket, St Brides, St Ishmael's, Steynton, Talbenny, Walton West and Walwyn Castle. It is named after the historical area of Roose. It has an estimated population of 29,405. As of September 2024 it was served by five Priests in Charge and two Associate Priests.

Church	Founded (building)	
St James, Dale	APC (1761)	
St Peter, Marloes	APC	
St Bridget, St Brides	APC	
St Ishmael, St Ishmaels	APC	
St Mary the Virgin, Herbrandston	APC	
St David, Hubberston	APC	
St Mary, Hakin	c. 1890	
Holy Spirit, Hubberston	1971	
St Justinian, Freystrop	APC	
St Peter, Johnston	APC	
St Jerome, Llangwm	APC	
St Clement, Neyland	1899 (1930)	
St Tudwall, Llanstadwell	APC	
St Mary, Burton	APC	
St Ishmael, Rosemarket	APC	
SS Katharine & Peter, Milford Haven	1808	
SS Cewydd & Peter, Steynton	APC	
St Mary, Talbenny	APC (1869)	
All Saints, Walton West	APC	
St Andrew, Robeston West	APC	
St James the Great, Walwyn's Castle	APC (1878)	
Former churches	Founded (build)	Closed
St Madog of Ferns, Haroldston West	APC	2022
St Thomas à Becket, Milford Haven	MC/1938	C17th/2012
St Peter, Hasguard	APC	1979

==== South West Pembrokeshire Ministry Area ====
This was formed by the union of the parishes of Angle, Bosherston, Carew, Cosheston, Hundleton, Lamphey, Monkton, Nash, Pembroke, Pembroke Dock St John, Pembroke Dock St Patrick, Pembroke Dock St Teilo, Redberth, St Twynnells and Stackpole Elidor. It has an estimated population of 22,718. As of September 2024 it was served by four Priests in Charge and one Associate Priest.

Church	Founded (building)	
St Mary, Carew Cheriton^{4}	APC	
St Michael, Cosheston	APC	
St Mary, Nash	APC (1842)	
St Mary, Redberth	APC (1841)	
SS James & Elidyr, Stackpole^{3}	APC	
St David, Hundleton	1908 (1933)	
SS Faith & Tyfei, Lamphey^{1}	APC	
SS Nicholas & John, Monkton^{2}	APC	
St Mary the Virgin, Pembroke	APC	
St Mary, Angle	APC	
St Michael, Bosherston	APC	
St Gwynog, St Twynnells	APC	
St John the Evangelist, Pembroke Dock	1848	
St Teilo, Pembroke Dock	1903	
Former churches	Founded (build)	Closed
St Patrick, Pennar, Pembroke Dock	1895	2020
St Michael & All Angels, Castlemartin	APC	C21st
St Deiniol, Pembroke	MC	C19th
St Decuman, Rhoscrowther	APC	C20th
Hodgeston Parish Church	APC	2000
St Michael, Pembroke	APC (1835)	2013
St Petroc, St Petrox	APC (1854)	C21st
St Mary, Warren	APC	1970
St Mary, Pwllcrochan	APC	1982
St Giles, Upton	APC	C20th

^{1}original dedication to St Tyfei ^{2}original dedication to St Nicholas ^{3}original dedication to St James ^{4}original dedication to St John the Baptist

==== The Cathedral Ministry Area ====
This was formed from the parish of St Davids. It has an estimated population of 1,772. As of September 2024 it was served by one Dean, one Sub-Dean and one Canon Pastor.

Church	Founded (building)	
Cathedral of (St Andrew &) St David, St Davids	APC	
Former churches	Founded (build)	Closed
St Justinian's Chapel	MC (C16th)	?
St Tyfanog's Chapel, Ramsey Island	MC	C17th

==== West Cemaes Ministry Area ====
This was formed by the union of the parishes of Castle Bythe, Dinas, Fishguard, Henry's Moat, Letterston, Little Newcastle, Llanfair Nant-Y-Gof, Llangolman, Llanllawer, Llanwnda, Llanychar, Llanychlwydog, Llys-Y-Fran, Maenclochog, Manorowen, Morfil, New Moat, Newport, Pontfaen and Puncheston. It is named after the historical area of Cemais. It has an estimated population of 12,033. As of September 2024 it was served by.

Church	Founded (building)	
St David, Llanychaer	APC	
St Mary, Fishguard	APC (1857)	
St Brynach, Pontfaen	APC	
St Mary, Manorowen	APC (1872)	
St Meilyr, Llys-y-Fran	APC	
St Nicholas, New Moat	APC	
St Mary, Maenclochog	APC	
St Mary, Puncheston	APC (1895)	
St Gwyndaf, Llanwnda	APC	
St Peter, Little Newcastle	APC	
St Mary, Llanfair Nant-y-Gof, Trecwn	APC (1855)	
St Giles, Letterston^{1}	APC (1845)	
St Brynach, Dinas Cross	1861	
St Mary, Newport	APC	
Former churches	Founded (build)	Closed
St Colman, Llangolman	APC (C19th)	c. 2020
St Brynach, Henry's Moat	APC	c. 2020
St Peter, Goodwick	1874 (1911)	2017
St David, Llanllawer	APC (1860)	late C20th
St Brynach, Cwm-yr-Eglwys, Dinas Cross	APC	1859
St Justinian, Llanstinian	APC	c. 2010
St David, Llanychlwydog	APC (1864)	C20th
St John the Baptist, Morvil	APC (C19th)	pre-2004
St Teilo, Llandeilo Llwydiarth	APC	C19th
St Michael, Castlebythe	APC (1875)	C20th

^{1}original dedication to St Sulien

== Dedications ==
=== Medieval churches ===
- All Saints: Capelgwynfe, Llansaint, Walton West
- Holy Cross: Llechryd, Y Mwnt
- Holy Martyrs of Mathry: Mathry
- St Afan: Llanafan
- St Aidan: Llawhaden
- St Ailbe: St Elvis
- St Andrew: Bayvil, Moylegrove, Narberth, Robeston West
- St Arthen: Llanarthney
- St Bledrws: Betwsbledrws
- St Bridget: Llanfraed, Llansantffraed, St Brides
- St Brynach: Cwmyreglwys, Henry's Moat, Llanboidy, Llanfyrnach, Nevern, Pontfaen
- St Cadog: Llangadog
- St Callwen: Cellan
- St Canna: Llangan
- St Cannen: Cilcennin
- St Caradog: Lawrenny
- St Carannog: Llangrannog
- St Caron: Tregaron
- St Cathen: Llangathen
- St Catherine: Granston
- St Cawrdaf: Jordanston
- St Ceitho: Llangeitho
- SS Celynin, Ceitho, Gwyn, Gwyno, and Gwynoro: Llanpumsaint
- St Cennych: Llangennech
- SS Cewydd & Peter: Steynton
- St Clydai: Clydey
- St Clydwyn: Llanglydwen
- St Colman: Capelcolman, Llangolman
- St Cristiolus: Eglwyswrw, Penrydd
- St Cwrdaf: Llanwrda
- St Cybi: Llangybi
- St Cyffig: Cyffig
- St Cynfelyn: Llangynfelyn
- St Cynin: Llangynin
- St Cynllo: Llangoedmor, Llangynllo, Nantcwnlle
- St Cynog: Llangynog
- St Cynon: Capelcynon
- St Cynwyl: Aberporth, Cynwylcaio, Cynwylelfed
- St Cynyr: Llangunnor
- St David: Abergorlech, Abergwili, Bangorteifi, Betws, Blaenpenal, Blaenporth, Brawdy, Bridell, Capeldewi, Henfynyw, Henllan, Henllanamgoed, Hubberston, Llanarth, Llanddewiaberarth, Llanddewibrefi, Llanddewiefelffre, Llanllawer, Llanychaer, Llanychlwydog, Llanycrwys, Manordeifi, Meidrim, Prendergast, St Davids, Whitchurch
- SS David, Teilo & Padarn: Llantrisant
- St Decuman: Rhoscrowther
- St Deiniol: Llanddeiniol, Pembroke
- St Dingat: Llandovery
- St Dogmael or Dogfael: Meline, Mynachlogddu, St Dogmaels, St Dogwells
- St Dyfan: Llandyfan
- St Edi or Edith: Llanedi
- St Edrin: Llanedren
- St Egwad: Llanegwad, Llanfynydd
- St Elidyr: Amroth, Crunwere, East Williamston, Ludchurch
- St Ellyw: Llanelli
- St Florentius: St Florence
- St Gelert: Llangeler
- St Giles: Upton
- St Gwenog or Gwynog: Llanwenog, St Twynnells
- St Gwnnen or Gwynin: Llanwnnen
- St Gwnnws: Llanwnnws
- St Gwrddelw: Gartheli
- St Gwyndaf: Llanwnda
- St Gwynno: Llanwinio
- St Hilary or St Ilar: Llanilar
- St Hychan: Llanychaearn
- St Hywel: Llanhowel
- St Illtud: Llantood, Pembrey
- St Ina: Llanina
- St Isfael: Boulston, Camrose, Lambston, Rosemarket, St Ishmaels (Carmarthenshire), St Ishmaels (Pembrokeshire), Uzmaston
- St Issel: Haroldston St Issells, St Issells
- St James: Dale, Manorbier, Reynalton, Stackpole, Walwyn's Castle
- SS Jeffrey & Oswald: Jeffreyston
- St Jerome: Llangwm
- St John the Baptist: Betwsifan, Capelifan, Carew Cheriton, Morvil, Slebech, Ysbytycynfyn, Ysbytyystwyth, Ystradmeurig
- St Julian: Tenby
- St Justinian: Freystrop, Llanstinian, St Davids
- St Kentigern: Llangyndeyrn
- St Keyne: Llangain
- St Lawrence: Gumfreston, Marros, Wolfscastle, Yerbeston
- St Leonard: Loveston
- St Llawddog: Cenarth, Cilgerran, Felindre, Llanllawddog, Manordeifi
- St Llonio: Llanllwni
- St Llwchaiarn: Newquay
- St Lucy: Abernant, Betwsleucu
- St Maedoc: Haroldston West, Nolton
- St Maelog: Llandyfaelog
- St Mallteg: Llanfallteg
- St Marcellus: Martletwy
- St Margaret Marloes: Eglwyscummin, Pendine
- St Martin: Clarbeston, Haverfordwest, Merthyr
- St Mary: Ambleston, Angle, Begelly, Bletherston, Brongwyn, Burton, Cardigan, Carmarthen, Cilgwyn, Coedcanlas, Fishguard, Haverfordwest, Hayscastle, Herbrandston, Kidwelly, Llanfairarybryn, Llanfairclydogau, Llanfairnantgwyn, Llanfairnantygof, Llanfairorllwyn, Llanfairtreflygen, Llanllwch, Llanybri, Maenclochog, Manorowen, Nash, Newport, Pembroke, Pencader, Puncheston, Pwllcrochan, Redberth, Roch, Spittal, Talbenny, Tenby, Trefilan, Walton East, Warren
- SS Mary & Curig: Llanboidy
- St Mary Magdalene: St Clears, Wiston
- St Meilyr: Llysyfran
- St Michael: Bosherston, Castlebythe, Castlemartin, Ciliauaeron, Cilycwm, Cosheston, Laugharne, Llandre-egremont, Llanfihangelaberbythych, Llanfihangelabercywyn, Llanfihangelararth, Llanfihangelcilfargen, Llanfigangelcroesfeini, Llanfihangelgenaurglyn, Llanfihangellledrod, Llanfihangelpenbedw, Llanfihangelrhostie, Llanfihangelrhosycorn, Llanfihangeluwchgwili, Llanfihangelycreuddyn, Llanfihangelystrad, Llannewydd, Mounton, Myddfai, Pembroke, Penbryn, Pencarreg, Rudbaxton, Treffgarne, Tremain, Troedyraur, Whitechurch
- St Nicholas: Monington, Monkton, New Moat, Penally, St Nicholas
- St Non: Llanerchaeron, Llannon, Llanycefn
- St Oudoceus: Llandawke
- St Padarn: Llanbadarnfawr, Llanbadarnodwyn, Llanbadarntrefeglwys
- St Paulinus: Ystradffin
- St Peter: Carmarthen, Hasguard, Johnston, Lampeter, Lampeter Velfrey, Little Newcastle, Llanybydder, Marloes
- St Petroc: St Petrox, Y Ferwig
- SS Philip & James (the Less): Cilymaenllwyd
- SS Potolius & Notolius: Llanddeusant
- St Reithan: Llanrheithan
- St Rhian: Llanrhian
- St Rhystyd: Llanrhystyd
- St Sadwrn: Llansadwrn
- St Saturnin: Llansadwrnen
- St Sawyl: Llansawel
- St Stephen: Llansteffan
- St Sulien: Letterston, Silian
- St Sylvester: Llandyssulfed
- St Teilo: Brechfa, Cilrhedyn, Crinow, Llanddowror, Llandeilo, Llandeiloabercywyn, Llandeilollwydiarth, Llandeloy, Trelecharbetws
- St Thomas Becket: Haverfordwest, Milford Haven, St Dogmaels
- St Tudwal: Llanstadwell
- St Twrog: Llanddarog
- St Tybie: Llandybie
- St Tyfanog: Ramsey Island
- St Tyfei: Lamphey, Llandyfeisant
- St Tyfriog: Llandyfriog
- St Tygwydd: Llandygwydd
- St Tysilio: Llandysilio, Llandysiliogogo
- St Tysul: Llandysul
- St Ursula: Llangwyryfon
- St Vitalis: Dihewyd
- St Womar: Minwear
- No dedication/dedication unknown: Castellan, Castelldwyran, Hodgeston, Llandyry, Newton North, Robeston Wathen

=== Post-medieval churches ===
- All Saints: Ammanford (1915), Llanelli (1872), Llangorwen (1841)
- Christ Church: Carmarthen (1869), Garnant (1842), Llanelli (1887)
- Holy Cross: Peniel (1887)
- Holy Spirit: Hubberston (1971)
- Holy Trinity: Aberaeron (1835), Aberystwyth (1886), Cross Inn (1871), Felinfoel (1857), Llanybri (1851), Mydroilyn (1890), Newcastle Emlyn (1842), Pontargothi (1865), Pwll (1903), Taliaris (C17th)
- St Aidan: Solva (1879)
- St Alban: Cwmduad (C19th/20th), Llanelli (1915)
- St Anne: Cross Hands (1939), Cwmffrwd (1866), New Hedges (1854), Penparcau (1910)
- St Barbara: Llanmiloe (1930s)
- St Barnabas: Felindre (1862), Llanelli (1872), Rhandirmwyn (1877)
- St Brynach: Dinas Cross (1861)
- St Catherine: Brynaman (1881), Princes Gate (1888)
- SS Catherine & Peter: Milford Haven (1808)
- St Celynnin: Bronwydd (1894)
- St Clement: Neyland (1899)
- St David: Blaencelyn (1894), Capelbangor (1839), Carmarthen (1837), Carregwen (1898), Clunderwen (1860), Hendy (C19th), Hundleton (1908), Llanelli (1892), Llanwrda (1904), Llwynhendy (1882), Nebo (1913), Pontrhydfendigaid (1900), Saron (1939), Tairgwaith (1913), Talgarreg (1899), Talybont (1909)
- St Edmund: Tycroes (1914)
- St James (or Iago): Cwmann (1890), Pontarfynach (1896), Rhos (1903)
- St John the Baptist: Slebech (1840), Ysbytyystwyth (1876)
- St John the Evangelist: Carmarthen (1890), Felingwm (1896), Llanelli (1887), Maesteilo (1903), Pembroke Dock (1848), Penrhyncoch (1882), Pontsian (1885), Sarnau (1889), Templeton (1862), Tirydail (1911)
- St Lleian: Gorslas (1879)
- St Margaret: Cwmllynfell (1905), Ford (1627), Glanaman (1907)
- St Mark: Cwmcoch (C19th/20th), Gwenlli (1897)
- St Mary: Aberystwyth (1866), Bancyffordd (1899), Burry Port (1877), Carmel (C19th), Cwmgors (1886), Cwrthenri (1832/1930s), Cynghordy (1883), Hakin (1890), Maestir (1880), Pontyates (1911), Strata Florida (C16th), Whitland (1853)
- St Matthew: Borth (1879), Goginan (1871)
- St Michael: Aberystwyth (1787), Ammanford (1882), Dafen (1874), Eglwysfach (1623), Eglwysnewydd (1620), Llanfihangelabercywyn (1848), Talley (1550)
- St Patrick: Pennar (1895)
- St Paul: Cwmifor (1854), Llanelli (1851)
- St Peter: Elerch (1868), Goodwick (1874), Llanelli (1869)
- St Sulien: Cribyn (1894), Tumble (1888)
- St Teilo: Mynyddygarreg (1890), Pembroke Dock (1903)
- St Thomas: Ferryside (1828), Pontaman (1890)
- St Tydfil: Llechryd (1878)
- No dedication/dedication unknown: Capeltygwydd (1890)

== See also ==
- Bishop of St Davids
