= St Mary's Church, Maestir =

Church in Ceredigion, Wales

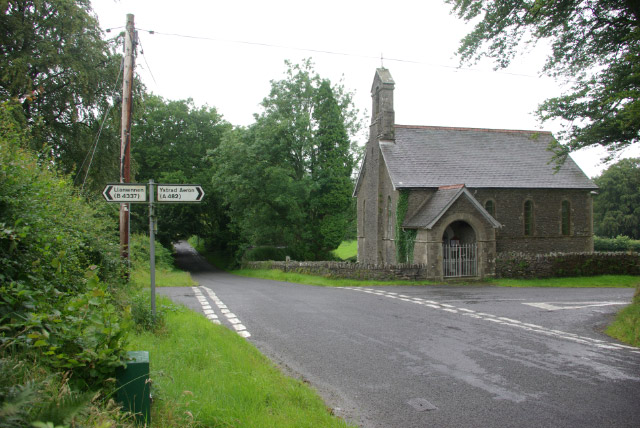
St Mary's Church, Maestir (2007).

St Mary's Church, Maestir, is one of the Church in Wales churches belonging to the United Benefice of Lampeter. It stands two miles north-west of the university town of Lampeter on what was once the Falcondale Estate.

== History ==
St Mary's Church was built in 1880 as an estate church for John Battersby Harford of Falcondale, ancestor of the Harford Baronets. The church also served as a chapel of ease for St Peter's Church, Lampeter. It contains a twelfth-century square-bowled font featuring carvings of the Four Evangelists that is originally from nearby Lampeter Church. It is one of a number of twelfth-century fonts - including those at Llanwenog and Llanfair Clydogau - that are distinctively Celtic Romanesque in style.

== Description ==
St Mary's is a small church, consisting of a nave and round apse, north-east vestry, west bellcote, and south porch. It has been described as "minimally Romanesque." In the apse are three windows made by Charles Eamer Kempe, dating to 1906. They depict the Virgin and Child, Saint Luke, and Saint John, and were installed in memory of Blanche, the wife of John Charles Harford of Falcondale.

== Services ==
Today, St Mary's has a service on the second Sunday of each month.
