= Glyntawe =

Coordinates: 51.835°N 3.678°W

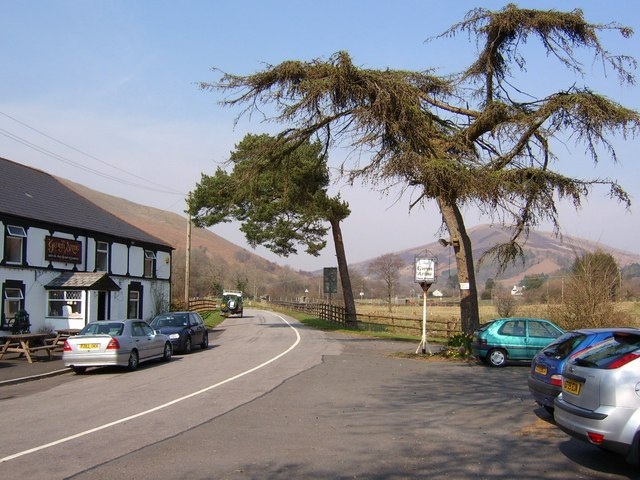
- View north from the Gwyn Arms, Glyntawe, in the Brecon Beacons National Park

- Location within Powys
- OS grid reference: SN 84472 16362
- Community: Glyntawe
- Principal area: Powys
- Preserved county: Powys
- Country: Wales
- Sovereign state: United Kingdom
- Dialling code: 01874
- Police: Dyfed-Powys
- Fire: Mid and West Wales
- Ambulance: Welsh
- UK Parliament: Brecon, Radnor and Cwm Tawe
- Senedd Cymru – Welsh Parliament: Brecon & Radnorshire

Glyntawe is a hamlet and parish on the upper reaches of the River Tawe in Powys, Wales, in the community of Tawe-Uchaf. It has always been sparsely populated. Today it attracts tourists for outdoor activities in the Brecon Beacons National Park and for caving. Glyntawe was also a community until 1986.

== Location ==
A Topographical Dictionary of Wales (1849) describes Glyntawe as, "a chapelry, attached to the parish of Devynock, in the hundred of Devynock, union and county of Brecknock, South Wales, 15 miles (W. S. W.) from Brecknock. It is situated at the south-western extremity of the extensive parish of Devynock, in a vale between elevated and dreary mountains, not far from the source of the river Tawe." Theophilus Jones in 1809 wrote of Devynock parish that,

The third chapel in this parish, in the vale of Tawe, is sometimes called Capel Glyntawe and sometimes Capel Callwen, a corruption of Cellwen, Fairwood chapel, or the chapel in the fair wood, descriptive no doubt of its early appearance; but so rude has been the hand of time and the equally denuding industry of man, so changed are the habiliments of nature in the course of ages, that she has here been disrobed of her verdant livery, which has been succeeded by a comfortless and slight russet mantle, incumbered by large stones and pebbles, and where the oak formerly grew in luxuriancy, the lichen at present barely vegetates."

== Prehistory ==
A prehistoric site at Waun Fignen Felen, Glyntawe, has been carefully studied by paleo-ecologists and archaeologists. During the Mesolithic the area contained a small open lake that was gradually choked by weeds. At first it was surrounded by open country, but later this gradually changed to woodland. Stone tools and debris from knapping from the early and late Mesolithic were found in different locations around the lake. They seem to have been occupied only for short periods, and perhaps were hunting camps. Tools at the site are made of stones from some distance away, perhaps acquired by trade.

The Ogof yr Esgyrn cave at the source of the Afon Llynfell, part of a very large system of solution caves under the Cribarth plateau to the west of the upper Tawe, was discovered in 1922 and excavated between 1923 and 1950. Finds date from the post-glacial period through the Roman era to historic times. The cave was used for habitation and for burial. The strata from different eras were mixed together, and included a bronze rapier, bronze razor, bronze awl, gold bead, bone awl and weaving comb, as well as pottery sherds from the Bronze Age.

== History ==
In the Tudor period the Lord of Brecon owned several corn mills, including one in Glyntawe, called Melin Gaeth in Welsh, the villain's mill, where the villeins had to grind their corn. When Edward Stafford, 3rd Duke of Buckingham, was convicted of treason they became the property of the crown. Queen Elizabeth I of England granted the mills to one of the Herberts of Crickadarn for sixty years. In 1633 a decree of court established the right to compel tenants of the manor to bring their corn to the mills to be ground.

In 1836 a chapel in the parish of Defynnog, Brecknockshire, was dedicated to Saint Callwen. (Note: But see above for Jones' theory that the name "Callwen" is a corruption of "Cellwen", meaning Fairwood.) Capel Colwyn or St Colwen's in Callwen, Glyntawe, was a chapel of ease to Defynnog until around 1868, when Glyntawe became a separate parish. The Imperial Gazetteer of England and Wales (1870–72) described Glyntawe as "a hamlet-chapelry in Devynnock parish, Breconshire; 7½ miles W of Brecon town and r. station. Post town, Brecon. Pop., 99. Houses, 20. The living is a p. curacy in the diocese of St. David's. Value, £80. Patron, the Vicar of Devynnock." On 1 July 1893 a new Church of Saint Callwen was substituted for the older building in the parish of Glyntawe by Basil Jones, bishop of St David's. Historical census figures for the hamlet of Glyntawe are:

- 1841 - 118 people
- 1851 - 107
- 1861 - 99
- 1871 - 102
- 1881 - 133
- 1891 - 144
- 1901 - 147

The community was never industrialised. The people of Glyntawe would have farmed, worked in the quarries or in Penwyllt brickworks, or perhaps worked at Craig-y-Nos Castle. The church was rededicated to St John the Baptist in 1964–65, although it is still called Callwen Church locally. The school in Callwen closed in 1970.

== Today ==
The rural community of Glyntawe, which includes the hamlet of Callwen, is part of the Community of Trecastle. The school is now the Glyntawe Outdoor Centre, an activity centre run by Dulwich College. Also called the Dulwich College Field Centre, this is a hostel that can sleep up to 40 people, and makes a base for outdoor activities such as hiking, mountain biking, caving or fishing. Glyntawe contains the National Showcaves of Wales at Dan yr Ogof, a major tourist attraction. This is part of a large system of caves which includes the Ogof yr Esgyrn. Craig-y-Nos Castle is very close to Glyntawe.

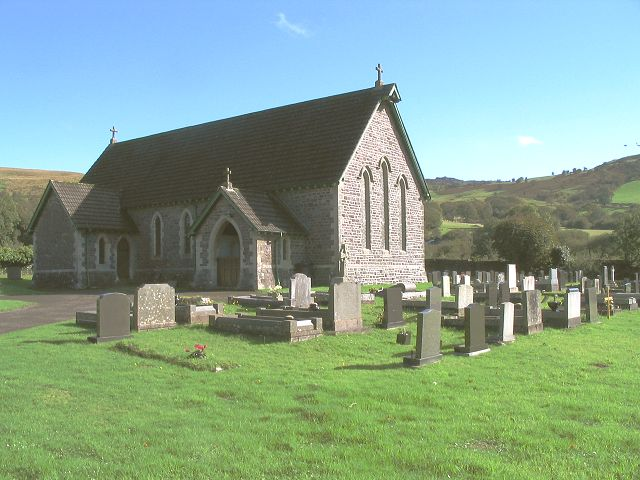
St. John the Baptist, Glyntawe

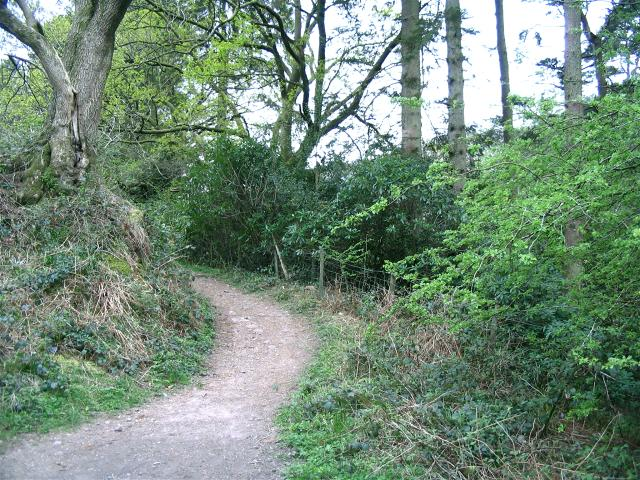
Bridle path adjacent to Craig-y-nos Country Park

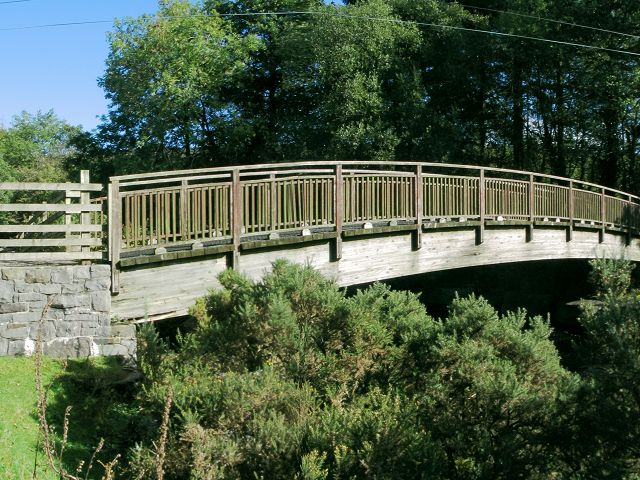
Footbridge over the river Tawe

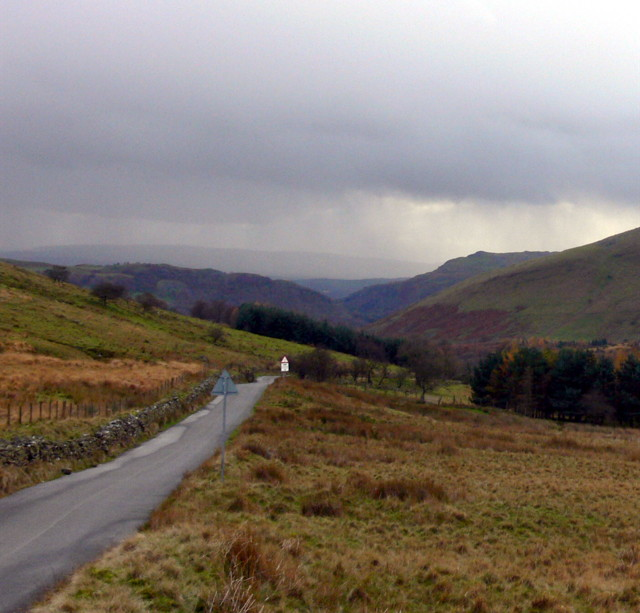
Upper Tawe Valley: mountain road from Trecastle to Glyntawe

== Sources ==
- Ball, John (18 March 2007), St John's Church, Callwen, Glyntawe, Breconshire
- Basil, William (29 August 1893), "Instrument" (PDF), The London Gazette
- Burrow, Stephen (2003), Catalogue of the Mesolithic and Neolithic Collections at the National Museums and Galleries of Wales, National Museum Wales, ISBN 978-0-7200-0516-5
- "Census figures for Glyntawe hamlet", Powys Digital History Project, Powys County Archives
- Dulwich College Field Centre, Glyntawe, Penycae, Swansea, Long Distance Walkers Association
- Glyntawe and Callwen, Trecastle Community, archived from the original on 13 May 2016
- Jones, Theophilus (1809), A History of the County of Brecknock ..., W. & G. North, for the author
- Lewis, Samuel A. (1849), "CAPEL-CALLWEN, or BLAEN-GLYNTAWE", A Topographical Dictionary of Wales
- Rees, Rice (1836), An Essay on the Welsh Saints Or the Primitive Christians, Usually Considered to Have Been the Founders of the Churches in Wales, Longman, Rees, Orme, Brown, Green, and Longman
- Royal Commission on the Ancient and Historical Monuments of Wales (1986), An Inventory of the Ancient Monuments in Brecknock (Brycheiniog): Later prehistoric monuments and unenclosed settlements to 1000 A.D, Royal Commission on the Ancient and Historical Monuments of Wales, ISBN 978-1-871184-19-8
- Wilson, John Marius (1870–1872), "Glyntawe", Imperial Gazetteer of England and Wales – via GB Historical GIS / University of Portsmouth, History of Glyntawe, in Powys and Brecknockshire : Map and description, A Vision of Britain through Time
