= St David's Church, Hubberston =

Church in Pembrokeshire, Wales

Coordinates: 51.715284°N 5.055685°W

St David's Church
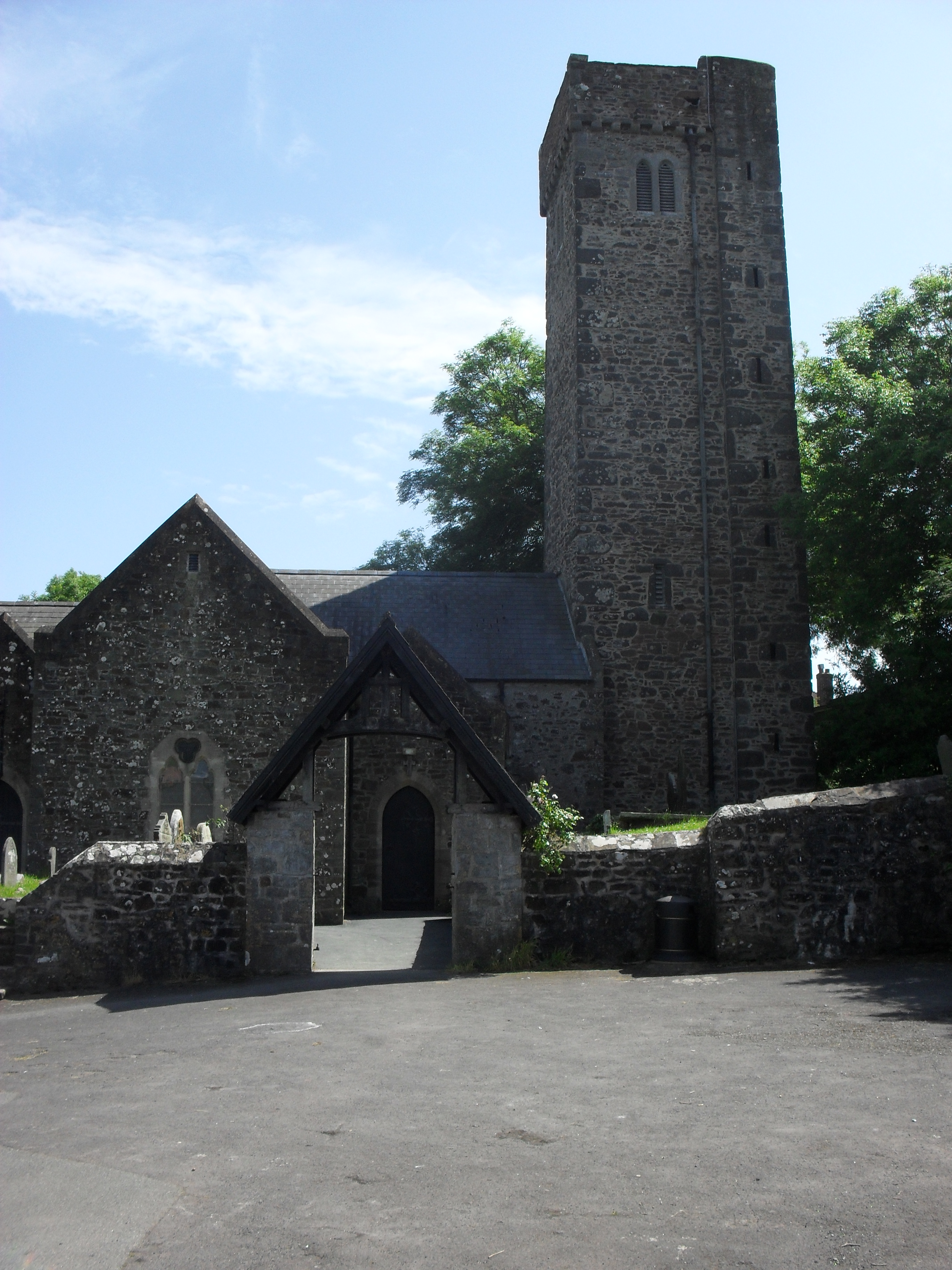

- Location in Pembrokeshire
- Country: Wales
- Denomination: Church in Wales

History
- Dedication: St David

Architecture
- Heritage designation: Grade I
- Architectural type: Church

St David's Church, Hubberston is the parish church of Hubberston, a village on the north bank of the Milford Haven Waterway, in south Pembrokeshire, Wales. The church has 15th century (or earlier) origins, was subsequently renovated and restored, and is a Grade I listed building.

== Location ==
The church is in the centre of the village of Hubberston, which is in the community of Milford Haven, the town to the east of Hubberston. To the south is the settlement of Hakin.

== Description ==
The small 15th century church is built in the south Pembrokeshire style of low, stone-vaulted nave and chancel and west tower. It is constructed of rubble stone with ashlar tracery and slate roofs. The north transept has an attached porch and vestry, and the south transept has an organ chamber. In the chancel there is a tomb recess and 15th century triple elaborate sedilia (seating for the clergy). The chancel screen is triple-arched, with delicate tracery. Further internal and structural details are described in the listing.

The tower has 1930s tracery to a small west window, a stair projection to the northwest, a corbelled parapet and a pyramid recessed cap. There are bell-openings.

=== Tombs and memorials ===
Under the altar there are early 18th century tomb slabs to the Allen family of Gelliswick.

== History ==
The church is 15th century, possibly built on an earlier structure. The font is 13th century. In the early 1800s, the population of the parish was about 1,000.

It was repaired in 1866–7. In 1929-31 it was restored and enlarged by J B Fletcher of Cardiff, including alterations to windows and doors. Some of the stained glass is 20th century. The church was listed Grade I in 1951.

The parish is in the United Benefice of Roose, generally referred to as the Roose Local Ministry Area, in the Diocese of St Davids. It is part of the Church in Wales, which is part of the Anglican Communion.
