= Brynhoffnant =

Village in Ceredigion, Wales

Coordinates: 52.134538°N 4.438301°W

- Location within Ceredigion
- OS grid reference: SN 3321 5127
  - Cardiff: 70.4 mi (113.3 km)
  - London: 189.1 mi (304.3 km)
- Community: Penbryn
- Principal area: Ceredigion
- Country: Wales
- Sovereign state: United Kingdom
- Post town: Llandysul
- Postcode district: SA44
- Police: Dyfed-Powys
- Fire: Mid and West Wales
- Ambulance: Welsh
- UK Parliament: Ceredigion Preseli
- Senedd Cymru – Welsh Parliament: Ceredigion

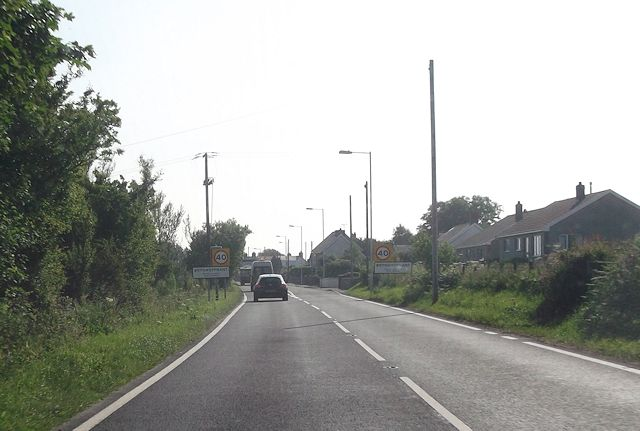

Brynhoffnant is a small village in the community of Penbryn, Ceredigion, Wales, which is 70.4 miles (113.3 km) from Cardiff and 189.1 miles (304.3 km) from London. Brynhoffnant is represented in the Senedd by Elin Jones (Plaid Cymru) and the Member of Parliament is Ben Lake (Plaid Cymru) .

== See also ==
- List of localities in Wales by population
