= St Michael's Church, Penbryn =

Church in Ceredigion, Wales

St Michael's Church
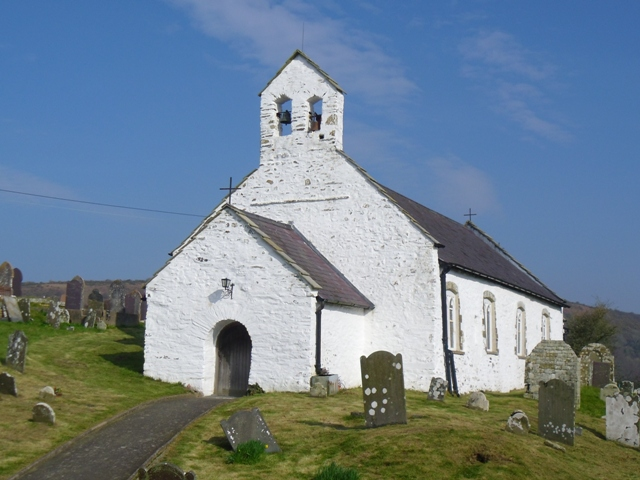

- Location in Ceredigion Location in Wales
- 52°8′39″N 4°29′35″W
- Location: Penbryn
- Country: Wales
- Denomination: Church in Wales

History
- Founded: 12th century

Architecture
- Heritage designation: Grade I
- Architectural type: Church
- Style: Medieval

The Church of St Michael at present (October 2023) holds services every Sunday at 11.15am. It is a Grade I listed church in Penbryn, Ceredigion, Wales. It is situated on a hillside on the western side of the Hoffnant Valley, approximately 0.5 kilometres (0.31 mi) inland from Penbryn beach. The precise date that the church was completed is unknown, but there is believed to have been an earlier church on the site during medieval times. The Church in Wales states that it is of 12th-century origin, making it the oldest in the diocese of St Davids. The roof is likely to be as old as the 15th century, though the porch is believed to have been added much later in the early 17th century. The windows were added in the early 19th century.

In 1887 the church was extensively renovated by D. Davies of Penrhiwllan, and it underwent another renovation 70 years later in 1957, possibly under A. D. R. Caroe. The interior is whitewashed, and features slate floors. The Royal Commission on the Ancient and Historical Monuments of Wales notes that the limestone square in the interior dates to the original building of the 12th century, and that the square font and font in the porch also date to the medieval period. The church became a Grade I listed building on 21 September 1964.

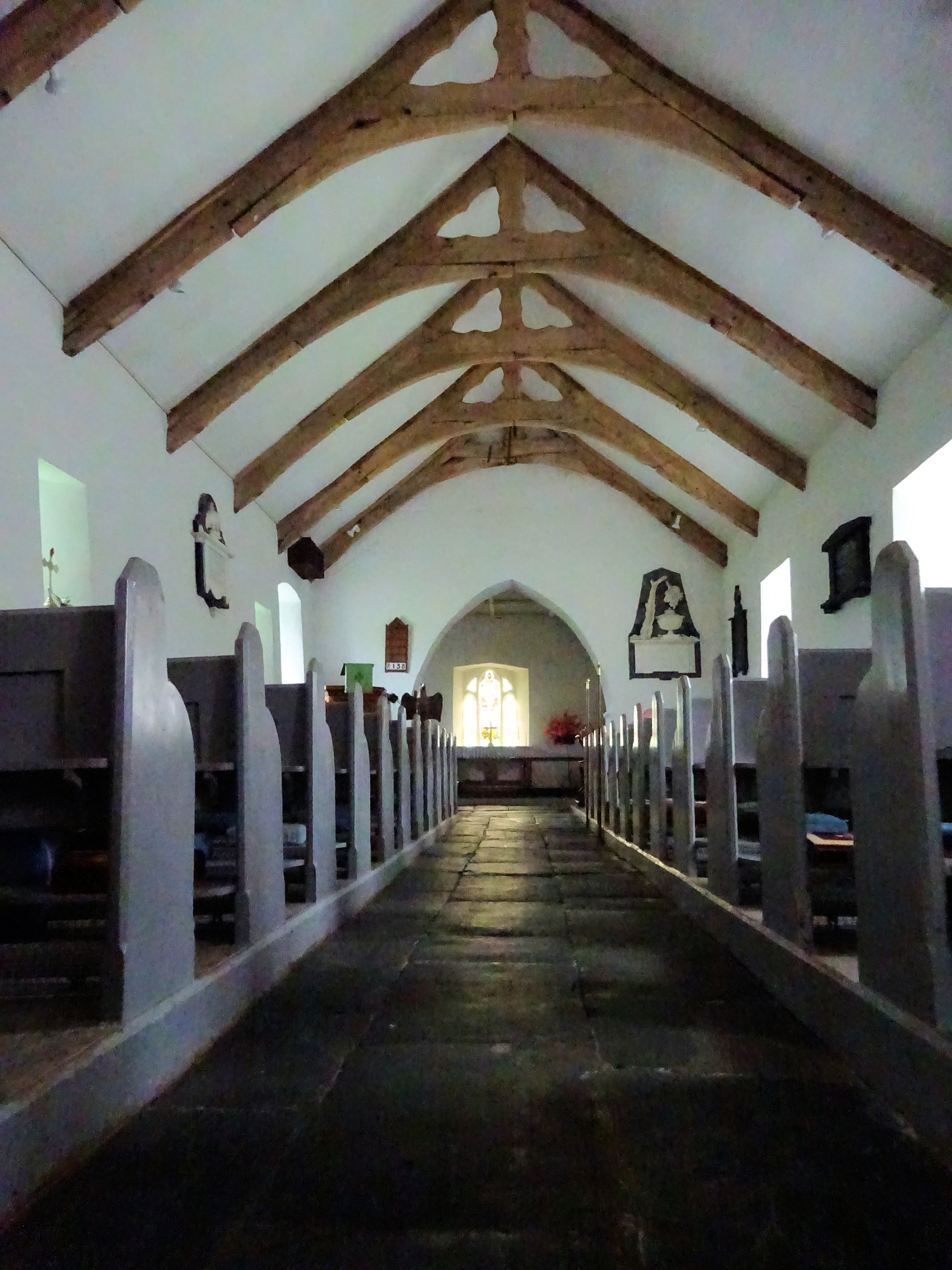
Interior

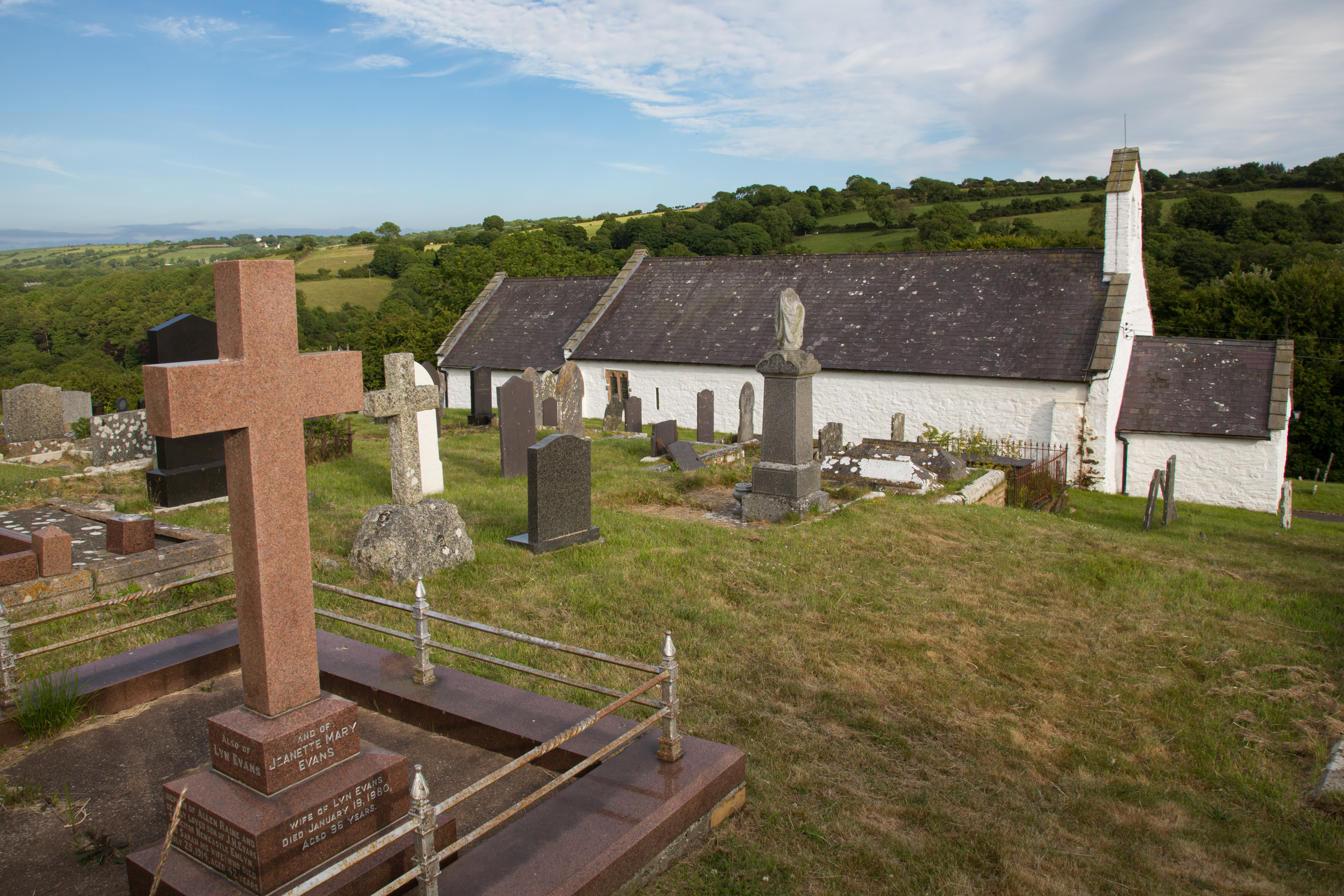
The grave of the novelist Allen Raine in the churchyard
