= St David's Church, Carmarthen =

Church in Carmarthenshire, Wales

Coordinates: 51.8567°N 4.3169°W

St David's Church
- Eglwys Dewi Sant (Welsh)
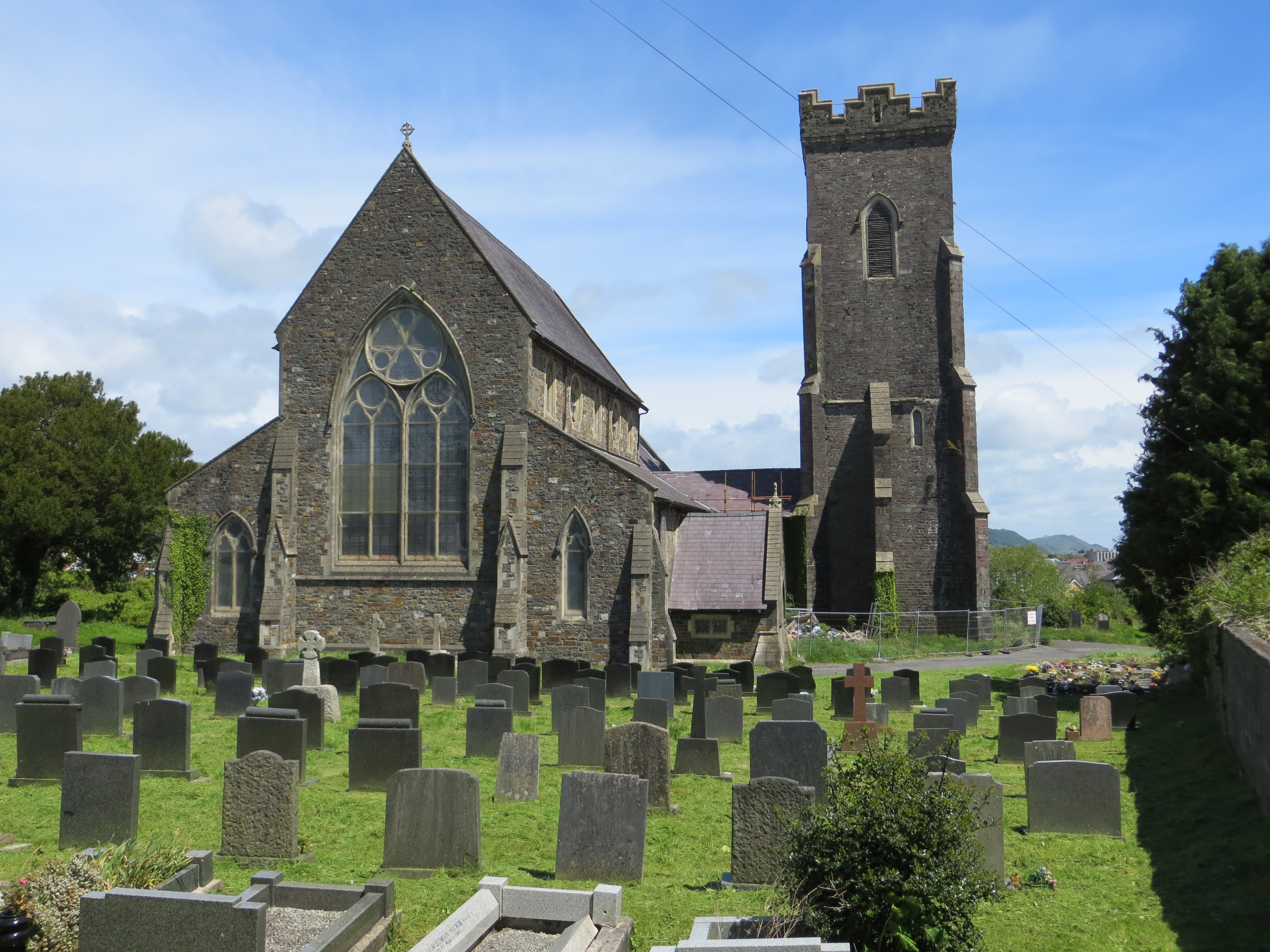
- St David's Church
- Location: Picton Terrace, Carmarthen
- Country: Wales
- Denomination: Anglican

History
- Founded: 1835

Architecture
- Heritage designation: Grade II
- Designated: 19 May 1981
- Architectural type: Church
- Style: Early nineteenth century
- Closed: 2003

St David's Church, or Eglwys Dewi Sant in Welsh, was an Anglican parish church in the town of Carmarthen, Carmarthenshire, Wales. Built in the 1830s and briefly considered as a possible replacement cathedral for the dioceses of St David's, the church eventually became the home of Carmarthen's main Welsh-speaking Anglican congregation. The church closed in 2003 after the building became unsafe.

== Early history ==
St David's was established as a result of an increase in the population of the town in the early nineteenth century, and at a time when adherents of the Church of England believed that worshipers were obliged to attend nonconformist chapels due to the lack of space at St Peter's, the only Anglican church in the town. Originally, the church was intended to be located on Lammas Street and to be known as St Paul's, on the site later occupied by Christ Church. A foundation stone was laid at this location on 27 November 1824. However, the owner of the land was not invited to the ceremony and subsequently withdrew his intended donation of land.

By the mid 1830s a new site for the church was obtained on Picton Terrace, Carmarthen. A foundation stone was laid at the site in May 1835. The weather on that morning was said to be unusually fine and John Jenkinson, the bishop of St David's was accompanied by Dr Llewellin, Principal of St David's College, Lampeter, his deputy Alfred Ollivant, later bishop of Llandaff, and numerous other clergy. By the time the ceremony had taken place a thunderstorm ensued and "the usual ceremonies were obliged to be hurried over in the midst of the peltings of the pitiless storm".

The church was built between 1835 and 1837 by Thomas Rowlands of Haverfordwest, following the designs drawn up by Edward Haycock. The first services were held on 19 January 1837. The church was formally consecrated by Bishop Connop Thirlwall on 3 February 1841. Prior to the service, the Mayor of Carmarthen, members of the corporation together with followers of local friendly societies formed a procession through the town to the new church. In the evening, John Griffiths, vicar of Llangeler, preached a sermon in Welsh.

After the church was opened, a long-running debate occurred in the town in relation to the language of services at St David's. These were held in both Welsh and English, despite the fact that the main reason for building a new church was to enable more services to be held in the Welsh language, and as a result to attract residents who would otherwise be attend nonconformist chapels. This matter was not resolved for nearly thirty years. Eventually, another parish church, Christ Church, Carmarthen, was built in 1867 to cater for the English members of the congregation of this expanding parish so that St David's could concentrate on providing Welsh services for Welsh-speaking parishioners.

== A new cathedral? ==
The church was originally a rectangular building on a north–south axis with a tower at the front. In 1853–55, a new nave was added on an east–west axis, built by John James of Narberth to designs by Richard Kyrke Penson. As a result, the interior of the church was rearranged with the altar and organ in different positions. These alterations were inspired by David Archard Williams, Archdeacon of Carmarthen. Williams envisaged that this development would become the nave of a new cathedral, to replace what was then a decayed cathedral church at St David's. However, Bishop Thirlwall had embarked upon the restoration of the old cathedral and Williams's vision never materialized.

== Twentieth century ==
In 1912-13 a major restoration was carried out, and the large West Window was largely re-built. This work was carried out by E.V. Collier. The church's re-opened with a service attended by the Bishop of St David's in March 1913.

Further alteration were carried out in 1938 by W.E. Anderson, when the north transept was removed and the south transept replaced by a much smaller vestry.

The church was designated a Grade II-listed building on 19 May 1981, being "a prominent C19 suburban church with landmark tower. The establishment and subsequent history of enlargement, trace the growing importance of suburban development in this area".

== Closure ==
Storm damage in November 2003 caused the closure of the church. In 2011 the building was sold for £1. Concerns about the condition of the church and graveyard led to calls in 2015 for the Church in Wales to take responsibility for the upkeep of the latter.

Planning permission was granted in 2020 for the church to be fitted out as a climbing centre.

The graveyard and grounds are now maintained by a charity which has been responsible for the restoration of the grounds and memorials. Its website describes the history of notable burials.
