= Llain-wen =

Village in Ceredigion, Wales

Coordinates: 52.113418°N 4.512606°W

- Location within Ceredigion
- OS grid reference: SN 2805 4910
  - Cardiff: 71.9 mi (115.7 km)
  - London: 191.9 mi (308.8 km)
- Community: Penbryn
- Principal area: Ceredigion
- Country: Wales
- Sovereign state: United Kingdom
- Post town: Cardigan
- Postcode district: SA43
- Police: Dyfed-Powys
- Fire: Mid and West Wales
- Ambulance: Welsh
- UK Parliament: Ceredigion Preseli
- Senedd Cymru – Welsh Parliament: Ceredigion

Llain-wen is a hamlet in the community of Penbryn, Ceredigion, Wales, which is 71.9 miles (115.7 km) from Cardiff and 191.9 miles (308.8 km) from London. Llain-wen is represented in the Senedd by Elin Jones (Plaid Cymru) and is part of the Ceredigion Preseli constituency in the House of Commons.

== See also ==
- List of localities in Wales by population
