= Gwenfyl =

6th-century Welsh Christian saint

Saint Gwenfyl
- Born: 6th century
- Residence: Wales
- Died: 6th century
- Feast: 1 November
- Tradition or genre: Christian

Saint Gwenfyl was an early Welsh Christian saint from the Brychan family. Little is known of her life.

== Life ==
Saint Gwenfyl was one of the children or descendants of Brychan. She founded a chapel named Capel Gwenvyl, which no longer exists, subordinate to Llanddewi Brefi in Ceredigion. Other chapels at Llanddewi Brefi were Blaenpennal chapel (Saint David), Capel Bettws Lleicu (Saint Lucia) and Capel Gartheli (Saint Gartheli). She shares a festival on 1 November with her sister, Saint Callwen. As with Callwen, her name is only mentioned briefly in the Welsh calendars or genealogies. Callwen and Gwenful were added to the number of children of Brychan in a short list of saints published in the Cambrian Register, but it would be wrong to assume they were more than descendants in some degree.

== Sources ==
- Cartwright, Jane (2008), Feminine Sanctity and Spirituality in Medieval Wales, University of Wales, ISBN 978-0-7083-1999-4
- Rees, Rice (1836), An Essay on the Welsh Saints Or the Primitive Christians, Usually Considered to Have Been the Founders of the Churches in Wales, Longman, Rees, Orme, Brown, Green, and Longman
- Smith, William; Wace, Henry (1880), A Dictionary of Christian Biography, Literature, Sects and Doctrines: Being a Continuation of 'The Dictionary of the Bible', Little, Brown & Company
