= Llanllwch =

Village in Carmarthenshire, Wales

Coordinates: 51°51′N 4°21′W

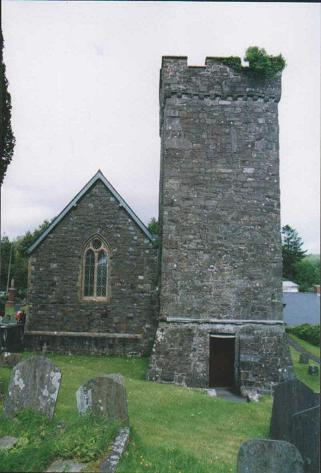
St Mary's Church.

Llanllwch is a hamlet in Carmarthenshire, Wales approximately 2 miles (3.2 km) west of Carmarthen.

== History ==
The name Llanllwch derives from a lake or pool nearby, the site of which is now a tract of boggy land west of Llanllwch known as Llanllwch bog.

=== The Parish of Llanllwch ===
The Parish of Llanllwch was originally a part of the historic Parish of St. Peter, which was divided into three districts by an Order of the Queen in Council dated 10 November 1843. In July 1857, they became separate parishes. The Borough of Carmarthen ceased to exist after the local government reorganization of 1974, but Llanllwch still remains within the authority of Carmarthen Town Council.

=== The Manor of Llanllwch ===
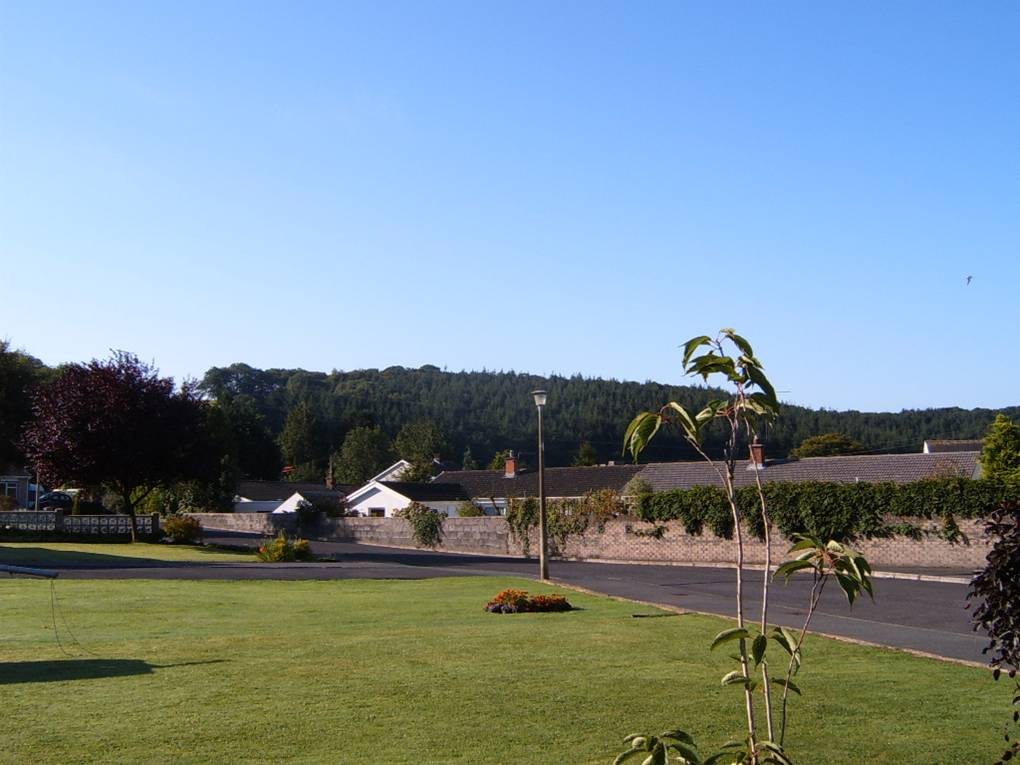
Manor Crescent

The Llanllwch area formed part of the royal demesne manor of Carmarthen Castle between Norman times and the late thirteenth century when they were farmed out for rent to 'customary' tenants called "gabblers" (gabularii) or "gafol-men", who were still tied to the castle. Other areas were let to local landowners. Eleven of the twelve gafol-men died from the Black Death between 1349 and 1350 and the other tenants abandoned their land, leaving the area uncultivated. There were also several water mills for grinding corn, one of which was documented in 1300. According to accounts of 1407–09, the hamlet and the mills were "totally destroyed and devastated" during the Welsh Revolt of Owain Glyndŵr.

== Cors Goch ==
West of Llanllwch lies Cors Goch, a lowland raised mire and one of the last six large raised bogs in Wales, and a Site of Special Scientific Interest (SSSI).

== See also ==
- St Mary's Church, Llanllwch
