= Callwen =

Saint Callwen
- Born: 6th century
- Residence: Wales
- Died: 6th century
- Feast: 1 November
- Tradition or genre: Christian

Saint Callwen was an early Welsh Christian saint from the Brychan family. There is some doubt about whether she existed. A church was dedicated to her in Defynnog, Brecknockshire.

== Life ==
Saint Callwen was a member of the Brychan family of Wales who embraced a single life and dedicated herself to serving God and her fellow men. Her feast date is on 1 November. She was one of the children or descendants of Brychan and shares the festival on 1 November with her sister, Saint Gwenfyl. In one list of saints she was said to have been Brychan's daughter, so would have been the sister of Cynog ap Brychan. The origin of the name and the spelling are both dubious, and early sources do not collaborate Callwen as a saint.

== Legacy ==
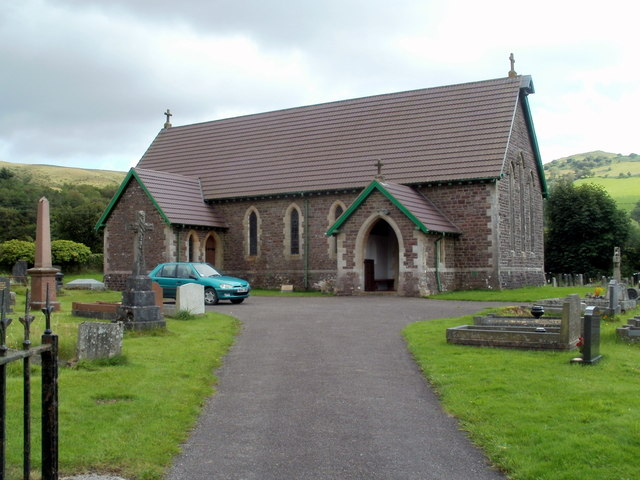
Front view of St John the Baptist church, Callwen, Glyntawe

Theophilus Jones wrote in 1809 that a chapel in the vale of Tawe in the parish of Defynnog, Brecknockshire, was "sometimes called Cael Glyntawe and sometimes Capel Callwen, a corruption of Cellwen, Fairwood chapel, or the chapel in the fair wood, descriptive no doubt of its early appearance." However, Rice Rees stated in 1836 that the chapel was dedicated to Saint Callwen. Capel Colwyn or St Colwen's in Callwen, Glyntawe, Breconshire was a chapel of ease to Defynnog until around 1868, when Glyntawe became a separate parish.

On 1 July 1893 a new Church of Saint Callwen was substituted for the older building in the parish of Glyntawe by Basil Jones, bishop of St David's. The bishop, Ellen Elizabeth Gwyn, widow and patron of the parish and Reverend David Hughes, vicar, certified that the change would be convenient. The church was rededicated to St John the Baptist in 1964–65. The local people of the village of Callwen continue to call it Callwen Church.

John Thomas Evans wrote in 1914 of All Saints church in Cellan, "Cellan means a little cell. The supposed female saint, Callwen, to whom the church is generally ascribed, is not very well authenticated. Her name does not seem to appear in any ancient list or calendar. It is true that Edward Lhwyd mentions a spring near the church, called Ffynnon Callwen, from which he says that it is supposed that Cellan takes its name. Sir Edward Anwyl, however, informs me that he does not think that Cellan and Callwen can possibly be the same word."

== Sources ==
- Ball, John (18 March 2007), St John's Church, Callwen, Glyntawe, Breconshire
- Basil, William (29 August 1893), "Instrument" (PDF), The London Gazette
- Evans, John Thomas. (1914), The Church Plate of Cardiganshire, London, archived from the original on 19 April 2016 – via Forgotten Books
- Glyntawe and Callwen, Trecastle Community, archived from the original on 13 May 2016
- Jones, Theophilus (1809), A History of the County of Brecknock ..., W. & G. North, for the author
- Powell, R.F. Pete (1990–1992), "The place-names of Devynock hundred", Brycheiniog, 24
- Rees, Rice (1836), An Essay on the Welsh Saints Or the Primitive Christians, Usually Considered to Have Been the Founders of the Churches in Wales, Longman, Rees, Orme, Brown, Green, and Longman
- Sheehan, Thomas W. (2001), Dictionary of Patron Saints' Names, Our Sunday Visitor Publishing, ISBN 978-0-87973-539-5
