= St Daniel's Church, Pembroke =

Church in Pembroke, Wales

Coordinates: 51.66673°N 4.91931°W

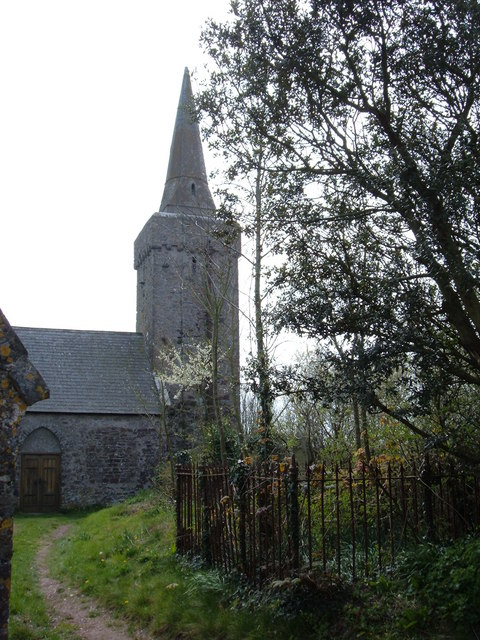
St Daniel's Church

St Daniel's Church is a Grade I-listed disused church in Pembroke, Wales, situated on a hill approximately 1.1 kilometres (0.68 mi) south of Pembroke Castle. One of the oldest churches in the area, it is located on an ancient, pre-Norman site associated with Saint Deiniol throughout the 6th century. The saint to whom it is dedicated is Deiniol, who according to tradition was the first Bishop of Bangor. It is claimed that Deiniol had a hermit's cell on the site, pre-dating the church, and the site has also been linked to Saint David. The site gained a reputation for miraculous healing, and became a shrine for pilgrims who would drink from the well. The current structure dates to the 14th or 15th century. It underwent repair in 1780, and again in 1849 and 1893. It became a Grade I-listed building on 10 February 1951. Today, the church, a small structure built of rubble stone with a slate roof, is disused and overgrown but the graveyard still has a public footpath running through it to and from the Windmill Farm Caravan park and Campsite. It has a nave, a chancel, and a spire, with a tower on the western side.

By 1832 the building was in private hands and it was being bought and sold along with the land on which it was built. At the end of the 19th century it was in use only as a cemetery chapel.
