= Hubberston =

Village and parish in Pembrokeshire, Wales

Coordinates: 51.715284°N 5.055685°W

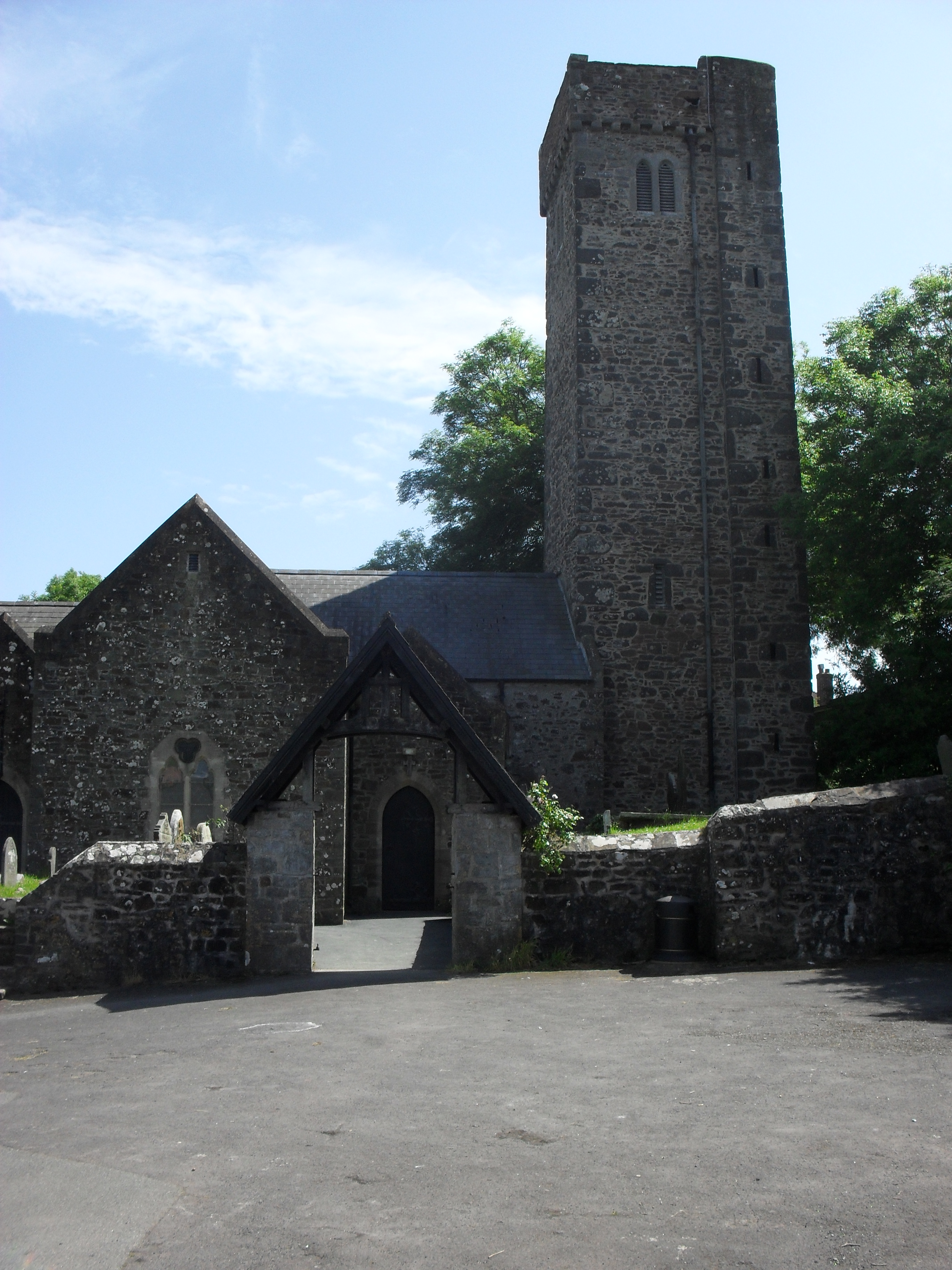
- St David's Church, Hubberston

- Location within Pembrokeshire
- Population: 2,313
- OS grid reference: SM899061
- Community: Milford Haven
- Principal area: Pembrokeshire
- Country: Wales
- Sovereign state: United Kingdom
- Post town: MILFORD HAVEN
- Postcode district: SA73
- Dialling code: 01646
- Police: Dyfed-Powys
- Fire: Mid and West Wales
- Ambulance: Welsh

Hubberston is a coastal village in Pembrokeshire, Wales. It belongs to the parish of Hubberston in the historical hundred of Roose. It is located directly to the west of the larger town of Milford Haven, and is a district of the community of Milford Haven. It is adjacent to the village of Hakin. It had a population of 2,390 inhabitants in 2001. It is mainly residential in nature.

== Etymology ==
The name does not have Scandinavian roots; it was first recorded in the thirteenth century as Hobertiston and Villa Huberti, meaning "Hubert's Farm" and "Hubert's manor" respectively, and has only been known as Huberston since the late fifteenth century. The earliest forms of the place name reveal that the town's eponym bore a Norman-French personal name.

== History ==
The village was built around the 15th century church, St David's, a Grade I listed building. By 1800, a mail coach was operating between London and Hubberston, arriving in the evening and returning the following day. Fort Hubberstone is a large battery located in the village. The fort was abandoned after World War I, but during World War II was in use once again as an air raid shelter and army camp for American military personnel.

== Transport ==
Hubberston is separated from Milford Haven by Hubberston Pill, a once tidal estuary. Access is via Victoria Bridge, which is reached via the A4076 through Milford Haven. A circular bus service operates, providing access to Milford Haven. The village is served by Milford Haven railway station.
