= Tyfanog =

Tyfanog also known as Tauannauc is a Pre-Congregational Saint of Wales. He was a preacher of the Gospel who arrived in Briton in AD 186 and ended his days on Ramsey Island. He established a community during the Roman era on Ramsey Island. He is said to have been murdered by the natives of Ramsey Island and that his body swam across to where the chapel was built. A feast day celebrates his life November 25.
