= Manordeilo =

Village in Carmarthenshire, Wales

Coordinates: 51°54′59″N 3°56′12″W

- Village
- Location within Carmarthenshire
- Principal area: Carmarthenshire
- Country: Wales
- Sovereign state: United Kingdom
- Police: Dyfed-Powys
- Fire: Mid and West Wales
- Ambulance: Welsh
- UK Parliament: Caerfyrddin

Manordeilo is a village in Carmarthenshire, Wales, near the River Tywi.
