= Church of All Saints, Llanelli =

Coordinates: 51.6847°N 4.1623°W

Church of All Saints
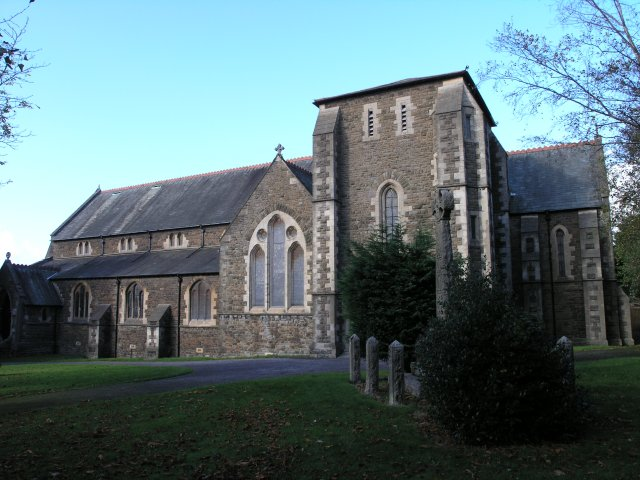
- Church of All Saints
- Location: Heol Goring, Llanelli
- Country: Wales
- Denomination: Anglican

History
- Founded: 1872

Architecture
- Heritage designation: Grade II
- Designated: 3 December 1992
- Architectural type: Church
- Style: Victorian
- Closed: 2011

The Church of All Saints is a former Anglican parish church in the town of Llanelli, Carmarthenshire, Wales. It was built in 1872 and is located in Heol Goring. It was designated a Grade II-listed building on 3 December 1992, and was reported to be closed in March 2011 due to electrical defects.

At the time this church was built, the amount of funds available was the determining factor when deciding on the architectural style to be used when building a new place of worship; the richer the congregation, the more ornate the church. Most churches cost somewhere between £1000 and £2000 to erect, but the Church of All Saints, Llanelli was estimated to cost £4,800 when it was built in 1872, the architect being George Edmund Street of London. Additional sums were spent in 1887 when the west end was completed according to the original plans. The exterior is built with brown rock-faced rubble-stone with Bath stone dressings, and the roof is clad with green slates and terracotta ridge tiles. Besides the "exceptionally fine 5-light stained-glass east window" there is another fine window in the south aisle.

The church was designated a Grade II listed building on 3 December 1992, and has a richly decorated interior with heavily carved reredos, and fine stained-glass windows. The Royal Commission on the Ancient and Historical Monuments of Wales curates the archaeological, architectural and historic records for this church. These include digital photographs of the exterior and interior, colour transparencies and black and white postcards. In March 2011, the church was closed because of electrical problems. The Church in Wales took the decision not to repair the electrics but instead to sell the church and invest the proceeds in other churches in the town.
