= Christ Church, Carmarthen =

Church in Carmarthenshire, Wales

Coordinates: 51.8562°N 4.3138°W

Christ Church
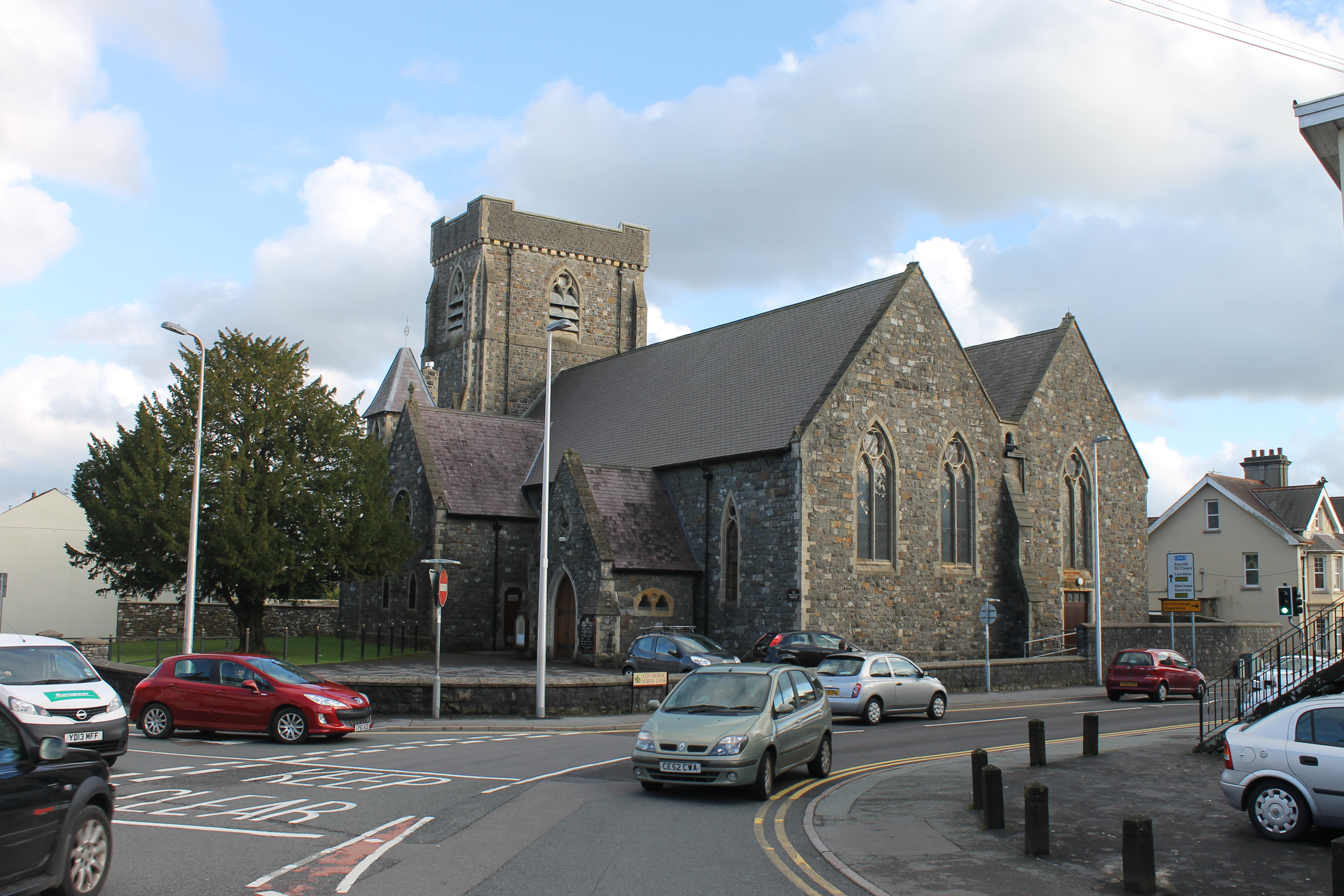
- Christ Church
- Location: Friar's Park, Carmarthen
- Country: Wales
- Denomination: Anglican

History
- Founded: 1869

Architecture
- Heritage designation: Grade II
- Designated: 19 May 1981
- Architectural type: Church
- Style: Victorian

Christ Church is an Anglican parish church in the town of Carmarthen, Carmarthenshire, Wales. The building dates from 1869 and is located at Friar's Park, Carmarthen.

The parish church of Christ Church, Carmarthen was commenced by R. K. Penson in 1867. It was officially opened in September 1869, during the National Eisteddfod, by the Bishop of St David's, Connop Thirlwall. It was designed to be the English-language church for this expanding parish while St David's Church was designed to cater for Welsh-speaking parishioners. The organ was added in 1873 and renovations took place in 1891. The church has an unusual central tower with clasping buttresses and gables halfway up.

The church was designated as a Grade II listed building on 19 May 1981, being "a prominent mid-Victorian church with crossing tower, a landmark in distant views".
