= St Mary's Church, Llanllwch =

Coordinates: 51.8442°N 4.3446°W

St Mary's Church
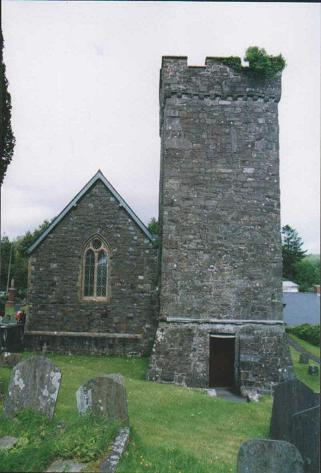
- St Mary's Church
- Location: 1 Manor Way, Llanllwch
- Country: Wales
- Denomination: Anglican

History
- Founded: Medieval

Architecture
- Heritage designation: Grade II*
- Designated: 19 May 1981
- Architectural type: Church

[[

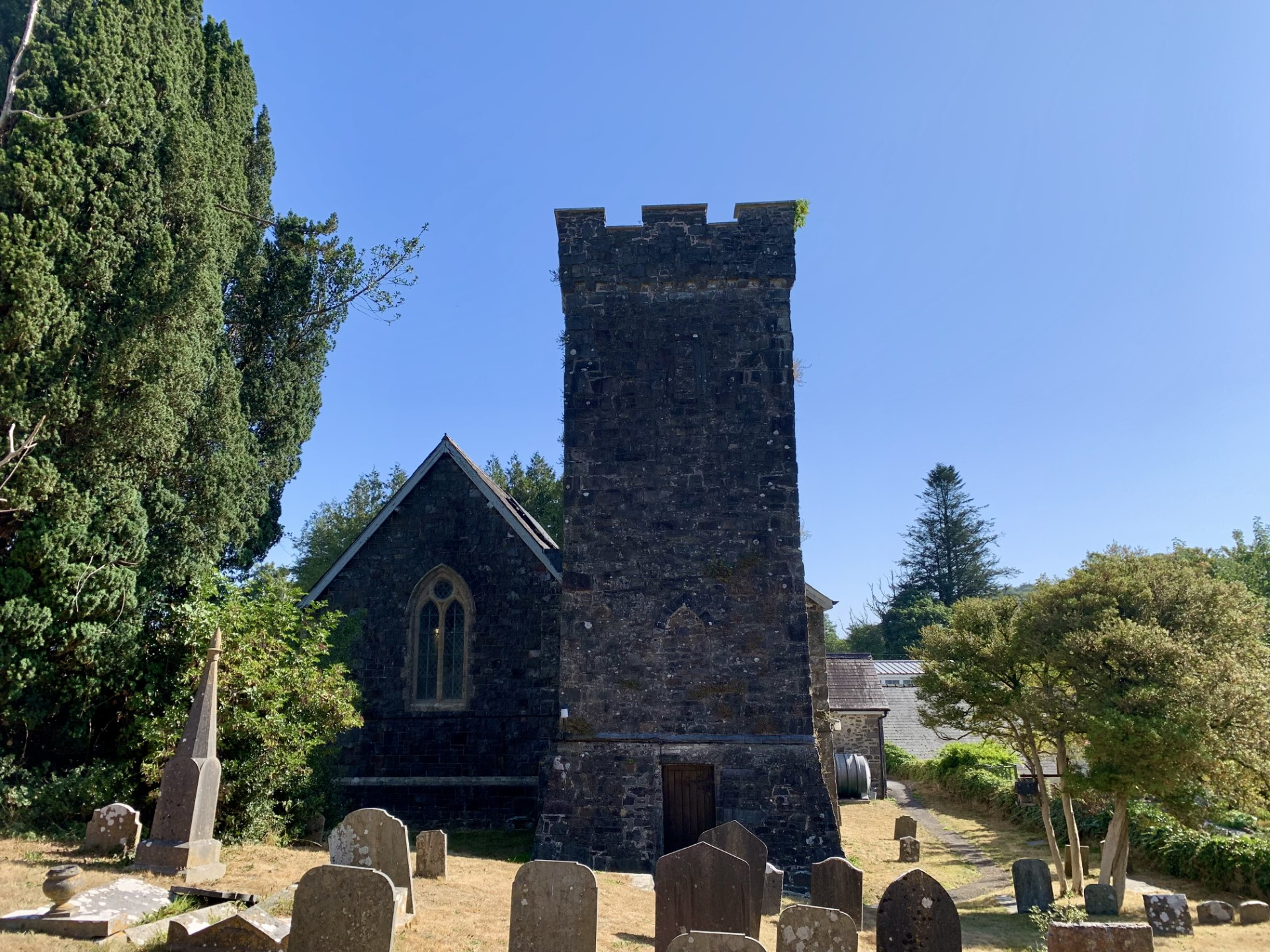
Front of church

|thumb]]

St Mary's Church is an Anglican parish church in the hamlet of Llanllwch, Carmarthenshire, Wales. It was originally a chapel attached to St Peter's Church, Carmarthen, both of which were conferred on the Priory of St. John the Evangelist at Carmarthen in the Early Middle Ages. The building has medieval origins and was rebuilt in the early eighteenth century. It is located in the centre of Llanllwch at the street address 1 Manor Way.

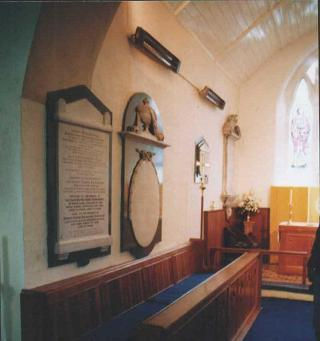
Monuments to the Edwardes family inside the church

The church was originally a medieval building dating back to the 15th century or earlier. It is built from stone rubble and the nave and chancel are partially whitewashed. The north aisle was added later and is built of rock-faced stone in courses with ashlar quoins and a plinth. The slate roofs overhang the walls at the gables. The short tower is supported by battlements. By 1710 the church was in a state of disrepair and had no roof. It was rebuilt by John Vaughan of Derllys Court. Further repair and restoration took place in 1827–1829 and again in 1869–1870.

The church was designated a Grade II*-listed building on 19 May 1981, as "a church of medieval origins early fabric. Memorials include one fine early C18 example." The Royal Commission on the Ancient and Historical Monuments of Wales curates the archaeological, architectural and historic records for this church. These include a photographic survey and several black and white negatives on glass.
