= Eglwys Newydd Church =

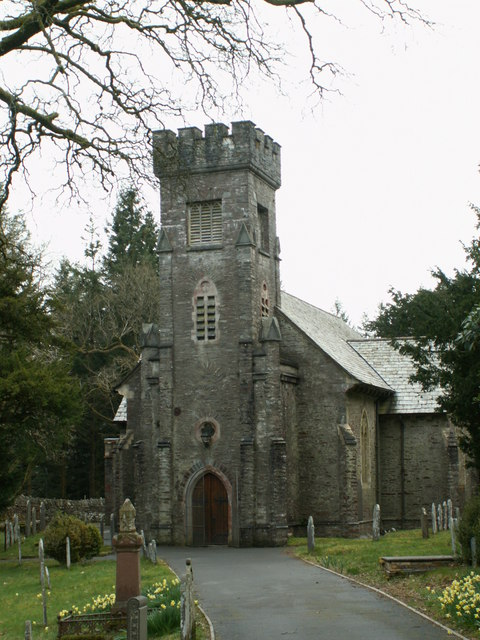

- Location within Ceredigion
- 52.3470°N 3.8091°W
- Type: Church
- Location: Ceredigion, Wales
- OS grid reference: SN 7686 7364

History
- Built: 1803

Listed Building – Grade II*
- Official name: Eglwys Newydd Church
- Designated: 21 January 1964
- Reference no.: 9867
- Community: Pontarfynach

Eglwys Newydd Church (also known as St Michael's Church, Hafod) is an early 19th-century church which replaced a previous chapel of ease. The chapel of ease was originally at Trisant but was moved to this site around 1620 by the Herbert family, owners of the Hafod estate. The church was designated as a Grade II* listed building in 1964 for its historical connects with the Hafod estate and the quality of work of the remodelling in the 1930s.

The 1803 building, designed by James Wyatt, was extensively remodelled in 1840 and 1887. The church was gutted by fire in 1932 and reconstructed by W. D. Caroe. A cross-shaped font, thought to be medieval, was stolen from the church in 1989.
