= Church of St Michael, Cilycwm =

Coordinates: 52°02′39″N 3°49′05″W

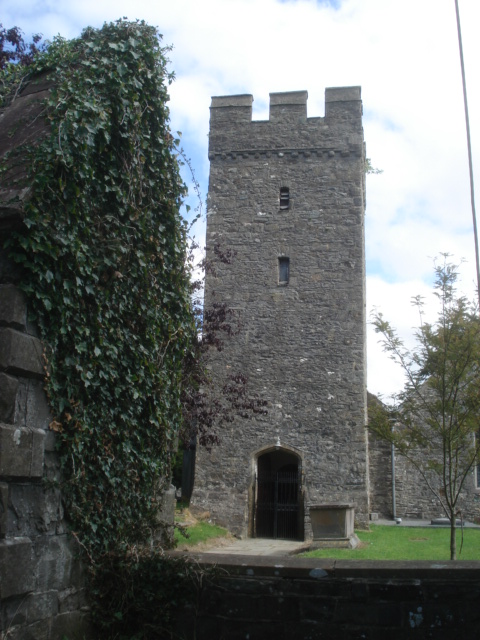
- Church of St Michael, Cilycwm
- Location: Cilycwm, Llandovery
- Country: Wales
- Denomination: Anglican

History
- Founded: Medieval

Architecture
- Heritage designation: Grade I
- Designated: 7 August 1966
- Architectural type: Church

The Church of St Michael, Cilycwm is the Church in Wales parish church for the parish of Cilycwm, near Llandovery, Wales. The rubble building with pink stone dressings dates to the 14th and 15th century, with restoration work being undertaken between 1905 and 1909. The church is located in the centre of the village of Cilycwm.

== Description and history ==
The church is an imposing building with a double nave, twin parallel roofs and fine tower. The north nave is the oldest part of the church and dates to the fourteenth century. The south nave was built in the fifteenth century and has its original wagon roof with moulded longitudinal ribs, and the tower is of much the same date. The pews, stalls and screens are plain, the pulpit has five sides and the altar rail has tapering columns. Several windows have stained glass and there are some notable monuments, but the most important feature of the church are the wall paintings in the south aisle dating to 1724 and 1795.

== Significance ==
The church was designated as a Grade I listed building on 7 August 1966, being a fine example of "a large medieval church, with a fine fifteenth century roof and rare series of wall-paintings".
