= St Peter's Church, Lampeter =

St Peter's Church
- Eglwys San Pedr
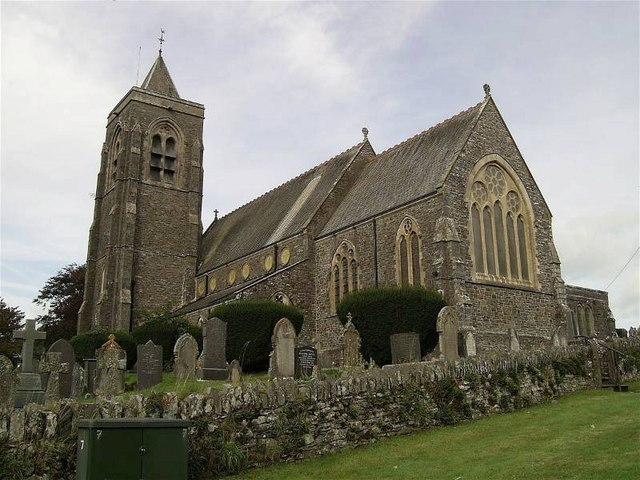
- St Peter's Church (2007)
- St Peter's Church
- 52°06′54″N 4°04′55″W
- Location: Lampeter
- Country: Wales
- Denomination: Church in Wales

Architecture
- Heritage designation: Grade II
- Designated: 11 March 1992
- Architect: R. J. Withers
- Architectural type: High Victorian Gothic
- Years built: 1867-70
- Construction cost: £3,554 17s. 4d.

Administration
- Diocese: St Davids
- Archdeaconry: Cardigan

St Peter's Church, Lampeter, is the Church in Wales parish church for the University town of Lampeter. It is a Grade II listed building, and has been described as "the best Victorian church in the county [of Ceredigion]". Though a church has stood on the site since the medieval period, the present building dates to the latter half of the nineteenth century.

== History ==
A Church dedicated to Saint Peter was first recorded on the site in 1291, from which the town partly took its name. This was replaced by a new and poorly built church by W. Wittington of Neath during the years 1836–8. This building, in turn, was replaced by the current church, designed by the English ecclesiastical architect R. J. Withers, and built during the years 1867–70.

== Description ==
The church consists of a nave, three-bay south aisle, chancel, north vestry, and south-west tower over the porch. It was built in the High Victorian Gothic style, and constructed of "grey-brown snecked rubble stone with ashlar dressings." The church's windows are worth noting - especially the west window by Wilhelmina Geddes. Made during the years 1938-45 and installed in 1946, the west window was commissioned as a memorial to Sir John Charles Harford of Falcondale House. In the porch are several monuments - survivals from the earlier church that include a Baroque stone panel in memory of Lady Jane Lloyd of Maesyfelin, who died in 1706.

== Churchyard ==
In the south-west section of the churchyard are the graves of the paupers who lived at Lampeter Workhouse. In the north section are the graves of many of the Polish people who, during and after the Second World War, made a home for themselves in Lampeter.
