= Gwrddelw =

6th Century Welsh saint

Gwrddlew or Gwrtheli, Gartheli
- Born: 5th century
- Residence: Wales
- Died: 6th century
- Feast: 1 November
- Tradition or genre: Christian

Saint Gwrddlew or Gwrtheli, Gartheli, was a pre-congregational saint of 5th century medieval Wales.

== Life ==
Gwrddlew was born about 480 AD at Twrcelyn commote, Anglesey, Wales. He was the son of Caw of Strathclyde. His father had moved from southern Scotland with his family after being deposed in the turbulence caused by the Anglo-Saxon settlement of Britain. He founded churches at Llanddewi Brefi, Cardiganshire, Anglesea and Caerleon

== Legacy ==
Gwrtheli or Gartheli is entered as patron of Capel Gartheli in the Myvyrian Archaiology. This was formerly a chapelry within the parish of Llanddewi Brefi, Cardiganshire, but as of 1907 was a separate benefice. Other chapels in Llanddewi Brefi were Blaenpennal chapel (Saint David), Capel Bettws Lleicu (Saint Lucia) and Capel Gwenfyl (Saint Gwenfyl). Nicholas Roscarrock lists 7 January as the festival of Gwrthelu, who may be identified with Gwrddelw.

Sir John Rhys in his Celtic Folklore, page 537, writes of the chapelry in Llanddewi Vrevi, "The ascription of this church to a Saint called Gartheli is more than doubtful, as Gartheli is simply garth Eli, that is, Eli's enclosure. If, therefore, the name of the place involves that of a saint, it must be an otherwise unknown Eli. In the account of the hunting of the boar Twrch Trwyth, in the Welsh romance of Culhwch and Olwen, there is a huntsman of Arthur's called Eli, who pursues Grugyn, one of the Twrch's offspring, to Garth Grugyn in Ceredigion. Garth Grugyn is supposed to be near Llanilar. Possibly the original story located at Garth Eli the death of Eli, or some other incident in which Eli was concerned, just as Garth Grugyn is for some reason associated with Grugyn."

== Etymology of his name ==
The etymology of the name is Vehemently Brave.

== Sources ==
- Baring-Gould (1907), The Lives of the British Saints, vol. 3, archived from the original on 4 March 2016 – via Forgotten Books, 2013
- Bartrum, Peter C. (1966), Bonedd y Saint, Cardiff: University of Wales Press
- Evans, John Thomas (1914), The Church Plate of Cardiganshire, archived from the original on 20 April 2016 – via London: Forgotten Books, 2013
- Jones, D.D. (2010), The early Cymry and their church, Nabu Press, ISBN 9781171608318
- Pughe, William Owen (1803), The Cambrian Biography: Or, Historical Notices of Celebrated Men Among the Ancient Britons
- Pughe, William Owen (1832), A Dictionary of the Welsh language, 2: explained in English; with numerous illustrations, from the literary remains and from the living speech of the Cymmry : to which is prefixed, the Welsh grammar, T. Gee
- Rees, Rice (1836), An Essay on the Welsh Saints Or the Primitive Christians, Usually Considered to Have Been the Founders of the Churches in Wales, Longman, Rees, Orme, Brown, Green, and Longman
