= Falcondale House =

Grade II listed building in Ceredigion, Wales, UK

Coordinates: 52.1213°N 4.0960°W

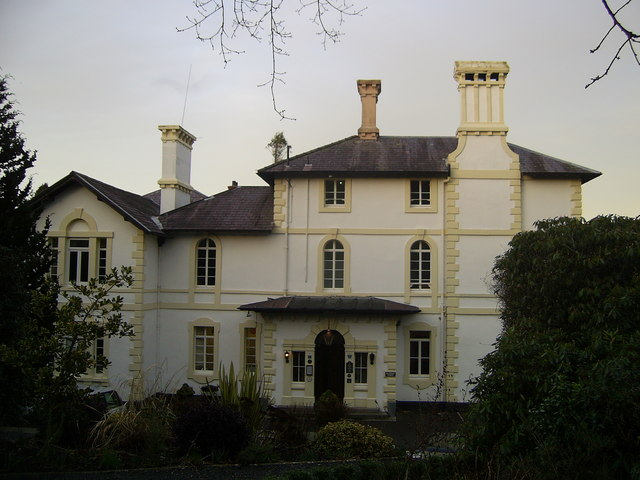
Falcondale Mansion Hotel, Lampeter

Falcondale House is a Grade II listed former country house, now the Falcondale Mansion Hotel, which is situated some 1 mile north-west of Lampeter, Ceredigion, in south west Wales.

== History ==
From the 1600s, the Peterswell estate had been owned by the Evans and then the Lloyd families, but due to financial problems and absentee owners the house was left empty and became derelict.

The estate was acquired in 1812 by Richard Hart-Davis, who planted several hundred thousand trees and possibly rebuilt the house. His daughter Louisa married John Scandrett Harford, author and art collector, and when Hart-Davis ran into financial difficulties, the estate passed to his son-in-law (and the latter's brother, Abraham Grey Harford-Battersby) in 1819 and subsequently to John Scandrett's nephew, John Battersby Harford. John Battersby commissioned architect Talbot Bury to redesign the house in an Italianate style in 1859 and lived there with his wife Charlotte de Bunsen, the daughter of Baron de Bunsen. On his death in 1875, the property passed to his son John Charles Harford, who, like his father, was appointed High Sheriff of Cardiganshire. He was created a baronet in 1934 but died soon afterwards. His eldest son, John Henry, had been killed at Thiepval during the First World War and so the property passed to his younger son, George Arthur, the second baronet.

In 1951, the house was sold to Cardiganshire County Council for use as a retirement home and most of the land disposed of. Around 1975 the building was sold to H. L. Smith to be converted into a hotel. In July 1994, Stafford Beer gave a series of 9 talks at the hotel. They were recorded to provide a video learning resource which are collectively known as the Falcondale Collection. They are available online at the Data Repository of Liverpool John Moores University. Since 2000 it has been owned and run as a hotel by Chris and Lisa Hutton.

== The coach house ==
The coach house was built in the nineteenth century, probably in 1859, at the time the house was rebuilt. It consists of a yard with a two-storey coach house on one side flanked by single storey wings and is listed as being a fine example of estate buildings of the period. The coach house, North Lodge and Falcondale Home Farm are Grade II listed buildings.
