= Penbryn =

Village and community in Ceredigion, Wales

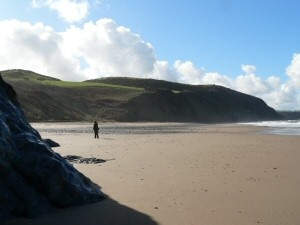
- Penbryn beach

- Location within Ceredigion
- Population: 1,270 (2011)
- OS grid reference: SN294520
- Principal area: Ceredigion
- Preserved county: Dyfed
- Country: Wales
- Sovereign state: United Kingdom
- Post town: LLANDYSUL
- Postcode district: SA44
- Post town: CARDIGAN
- Postcode district: SA43
- Dialling code: 01269
- Police: Dyfed-Powys
- Fire: Mid and West Wales
- Ambulance: Welsh
- UK Parliament: Ceredigion Preseli
- Senedd Cymru – Welsh Parliament: Ceredigion Penfro
- List of places UK Wales Ceredigion 52.13988°N 4.49436°W Community map: Map of the community

Penbryn (grid reference SN296520) is a small coastal village and community in Ceredigion, Wales, about 8 miles (13 km) from Cardigan.

== History ==
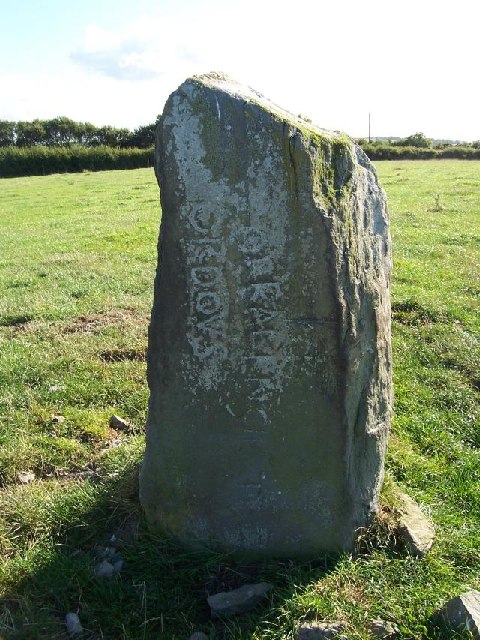
The Corbalengi Stone

=== Corbalengi Stone ===
Standing in a field between Penbryn and Tresaith (grid reference SN28905137) is the 6th century Corbalengi Stone. This 1.4 metre high monolith is believed to date from the post-Roman period and carries the inscription "CORBALENGI IACIT ORDOVS". The stone was first noted by Edward Lhywd in 1695 who described it as being in a field near the church. It was originally associated with a cairn of smaller stones beneath which was discovered an urn of ashes and a Roman gold coin dating to AD 69 along with silver and bronze coins. The final word 'Ordovs' of the inscription (after IACIT, "lies") is believed to refer to the Ordovices tribe of North Wales, with the suggestion that the stone was carved by local tribes in honour of a member of the Ordovices who had settled in the area.

Other readings and interpretations are: "Cor Balenci jacit Ordous", interpreted as: "The Heart of Balengus the Ordovician lies here", and "CORBALENGI LACIT ORDOVS" ("Lacit" = "thrashed", rather than "Iacit" = lies), in which case it would refer to a tribal battle between the Ordovices and the "Corbalengi". Although the Ordovices are reasonably well known, no other record of a Corbalengi tribe is known.

=== Church ===
The Grade I listed church of St. Michael is of particular interest due to its medieval slate roof. The location of the church on a promontory above the sea is said to be from where Penbryn, meaning "Hill Head", derives its name. The church stands in a circular churchyard, suggesting its construction on a previous Druidical site, tradition being that this would leave nowhere for the devil to hide. The church is built of local stone, with a 13th-century nave, a 14th-century chancel and a 17th-century porch. The church was renovated in 1887 and 1957.

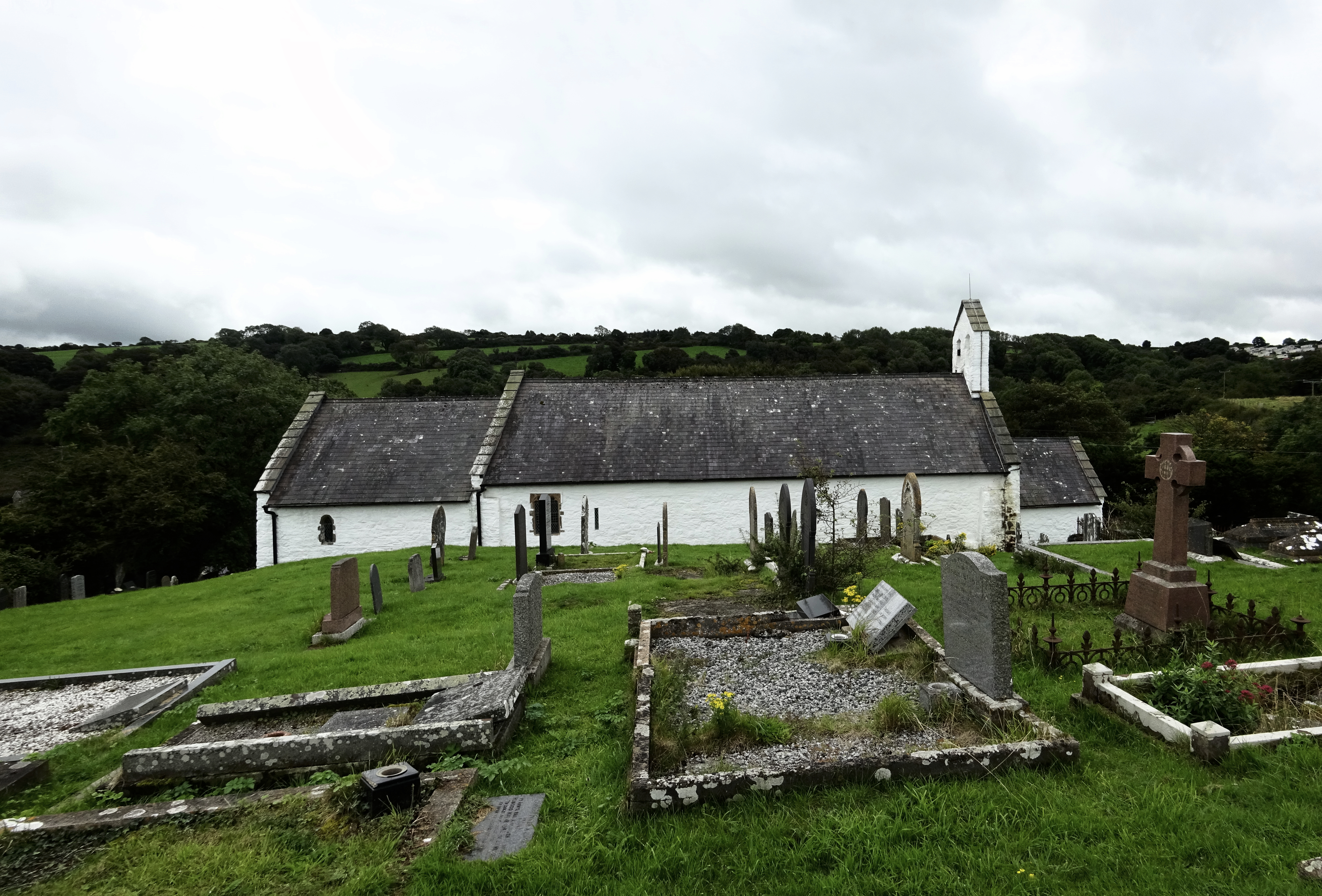
The church of St. Michael

The ancient Llanborth mansion, owned by the Vaughan family, was on the site of the current farmhouse next to the beach car park, whilst the Tudor mansion of Duffryn Hownant lay inland, higher up the valley. No evidence of either now remains. In the 18th century, Penbryn was well known as a landing place for smuggled goods, being described as a "dark country" by the Methodist leader Howell Harries on a visit to the area in the 1740s. The wooded valley through which the river Hoffnant flows to the beach is known as Cwm Lladron ("Robbers' Valley") to reflect this. During the 18th century the beach was also used as a landing place for fishing boats and trading vessels, including those bringing lime from south Pembrokeshire for use as fertiliser on the acidic soils of Ceredigion. This trade had ceased by the 1860s due to the exposed and hazardous shoreline.

During the 19th century the Penbryn area was predominantly Nonconformist in religious persuasion, and in June 1843 during the Rebecca Riots, the vicar of the parish received a letter from "Rebecca" threatening to "cut off your arm and your leg and ....burn all that you have" should he refuse to return a family bible taken from a poor parishioner who was unable to pay his tithes.

Discontentment with the church and the tithe system continued throughout the 19th and early 20th centuries, and there was anti-tithe rioting in the 1880s and 1890s. This resulted in regular requests by bailiffs visiting the area to collect tithe monies for police protection against attack. One such incident occurred on 19 March 1889, when police and bailiffs were set upon by an angry crowd wielding pitchforks and a knife.

== Geography ==
Penbryn is in the valley of the River Hoffnant, close to its mouth at Traeth Penbryn.

The community of Penbryn also includes the villages of Tre-saith, Brynhoffnant, Glynarthen, Penmorfa, Sarnau and Tan-y-groes, and the hamlet Llain-wen.

== Traeth Penbryn ==
Traeth Penbryn is a popular 1 1/2 miles (2.4 km) long sandy beach with a car park. It is owned by the National Trust, and was a location in the James Bond film Die Another Day. There are several caves at the north end of the beach and at low tide a further large sandy bay can be accessed along the beach to the north and Tresaith can be reached to the west. Penbryn lies on the Ceredigion Coast Path with steep routes along the cliff tops.

== Population and Governance ==
At the 2011 census the population of the community of Penbryn was 1,270, of whom 49.7% were able to speak Welsh. This was a fall in Welsh speakers of 3.8% from the 2001 census. There is an electoral ward of Penbryn (for Ceredigion council) which extends beyond the Penbryn community and has a total population of 2,045.
