= George Morgan & Son =

Welsh architectural firm

- Industry: Architecture
- Founder: George Morgan
- Headquarters: 24 King Street, Carmarthen, Wales

George Morgan & Son (or G. Morgan & Son) was an architect company at 24 King Street in Carmarthen, South Wales during the late 19th century and early 20th century.

It consisted of George Morgan and his son John Howard Morgan. One of George Morgan's other sons, William Vincent Morgan, also trained at the company. They built a large number of churches in South West Wales, including English Baptist Church, Carmarthen, as well as many other buildings.

== History ==
George Morgan designed his first building in 1870. He established George Morgan & Son, alongside his son, J. Howard Morgan. They built chapels, banks, churches, schools, commercial buildings, houses, and farms. George's son W. V. Morgan designed schools.

=== George Morgan ===
George Morgan (1834–1915) was an architect who established the company George Morgan & Son. He lived at 24 King Street in Carmarthen. He designed 80 schools, as well as chapels, commercial properties, and private homes.

The first building of his career was the English Baptist Church on Lammas Street in Carmarthen, which was built 1869–1870 in the High Classical style. He was also a deacon of the chapel. After 1875, he then moved into the Italian Romanesque style, designing a series of Baptist chapels that may echo the Central Baptist Church on Shaftesbury Avenue, beginning with Y Priordy Independent Chapel in Carmarthen (built in 1875–1876) and including Salem Baptist Chapel in Ferryside (built in 1877–1878).

He designed other churches in Carmarthen, including Bethania Calvinistic Methodist Chapel (a branch of Capel Heol Dŵr built in 1902; designed alongside his son), as well as adaptations, including adding a schoolroom, to Tabernacle Baptist Chapel on Waterloo Terrace (schoolroom built in 1883–1884 and other changes in 1900). He also designed the schoolroom attached to Heol Awst Independent Chapel on Lammas Street (built in 1888–1889), and the one attached to Penuel Baptist Chapel on Penuel Street (built in 1886).

Outside of Carmarthen, he designed Deer Park Baptist Church in Tenby (built 1884–1885), Mount Pleasant Baptist Chapel in Swansea (enlarged in 1874–1876), Ebenezer Baptist Chapel in Llandeilo (built in 1877), Moriah Congregational Chapel in Blaenwaun (built in 1883), North Road Baptist Chapel in Milford Haven (built in 1878), Newtown Baptist Church (built in 1881), Ebenezer Chapel in Port Talbot (rebuilt in 1880), Ebenezer Baptist Chapel in Llandovery (renewed in 1884–1885), Abergavenny Baptist Church (built in 1877), Mount Zion Chapel on Priory Street, Cardigan (built in 1878), Bethesda Baptist Church, Haverfordwest (rebuilt in 1878), and Merchants Hill Baptist Church in Pontypool (built in 1888).

In addition to churches, in Carmarthen, he designed the Carmarthen School of Art (built in 1891–1892); 9–10 Guildhall Square (built in 1900–1903; currently the Barclays Bank building in Carmarthen; formerly London and Provincial Bank); Towy Works (built in 1907–1909); houses at Penllwyn Park (built in 1893–1897), including Gwynfryn at 16 Penllwyn Park (built c. 1900 for Charles William Jones); The Boys' Grammar School at Parc Myrddin, Richmond Terrace (built in c. 1894); and extensions to Carmarthen Workhouse (extended in the 1880s and 1890s). He also built Bradford House in the Maesgwynne estate in Llanboidy (built in c. 1880), and both Rhydgarnwen (built in c. 1890) and Rhosygilwen (rebuilt in 1885–1887) in Cilgerran.

Examples of George Morgan's buildings
English Baptist Church, Carmarthen in 2018; built 1869–1870

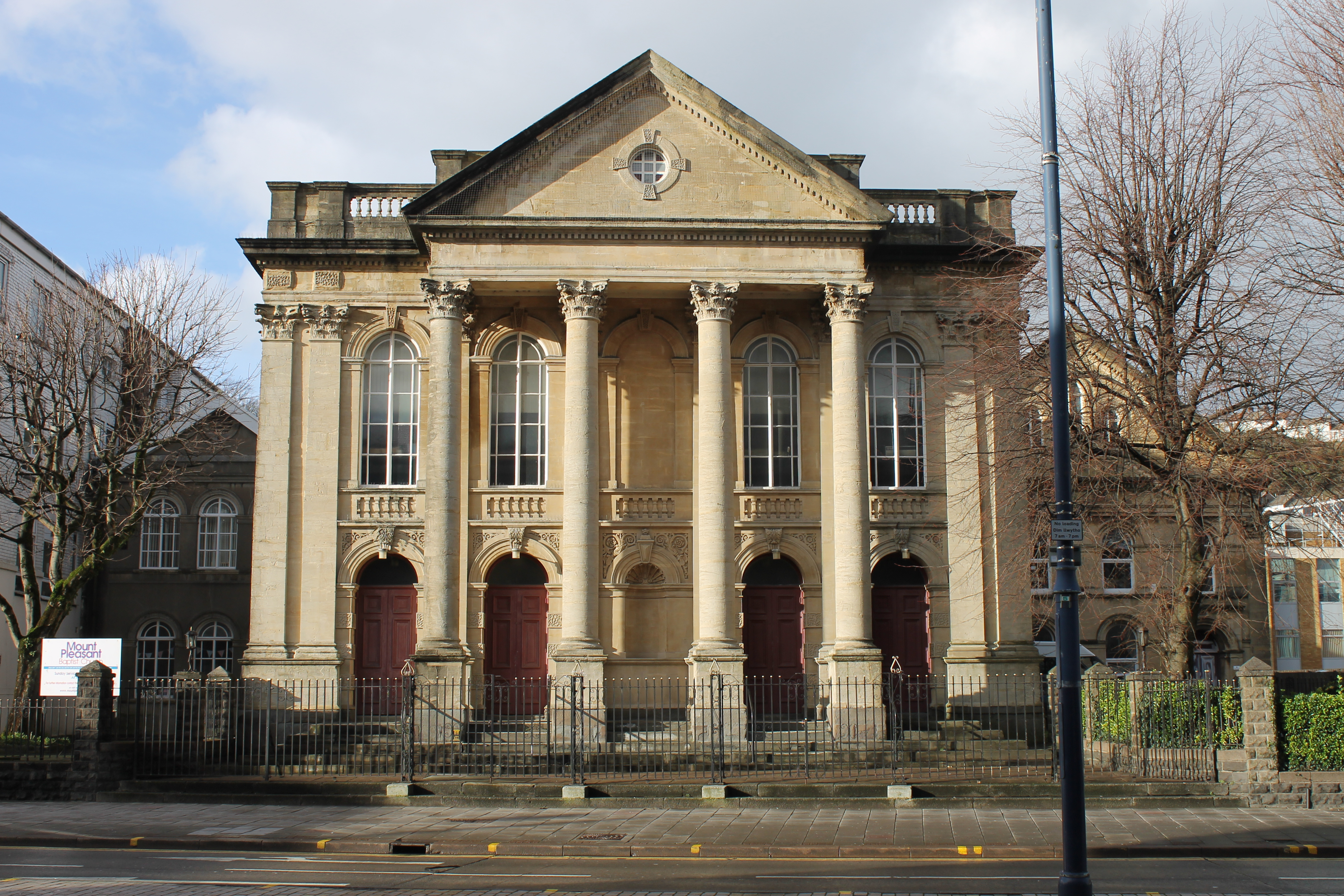
Mount Pleasant Baptist Chapel, Swansea in 2014; enlarged 1874–1876

Abergavenny Baptist Church in 2018; built 1877

Salem Baptist Chapel, Ferryside in 2015; built in 1877–1878

Bethesda Baptist Church, Haverfordwest in 2007; rebuilt 1878

Mount Zion Chapel, Cardigan in 2016; built 1878

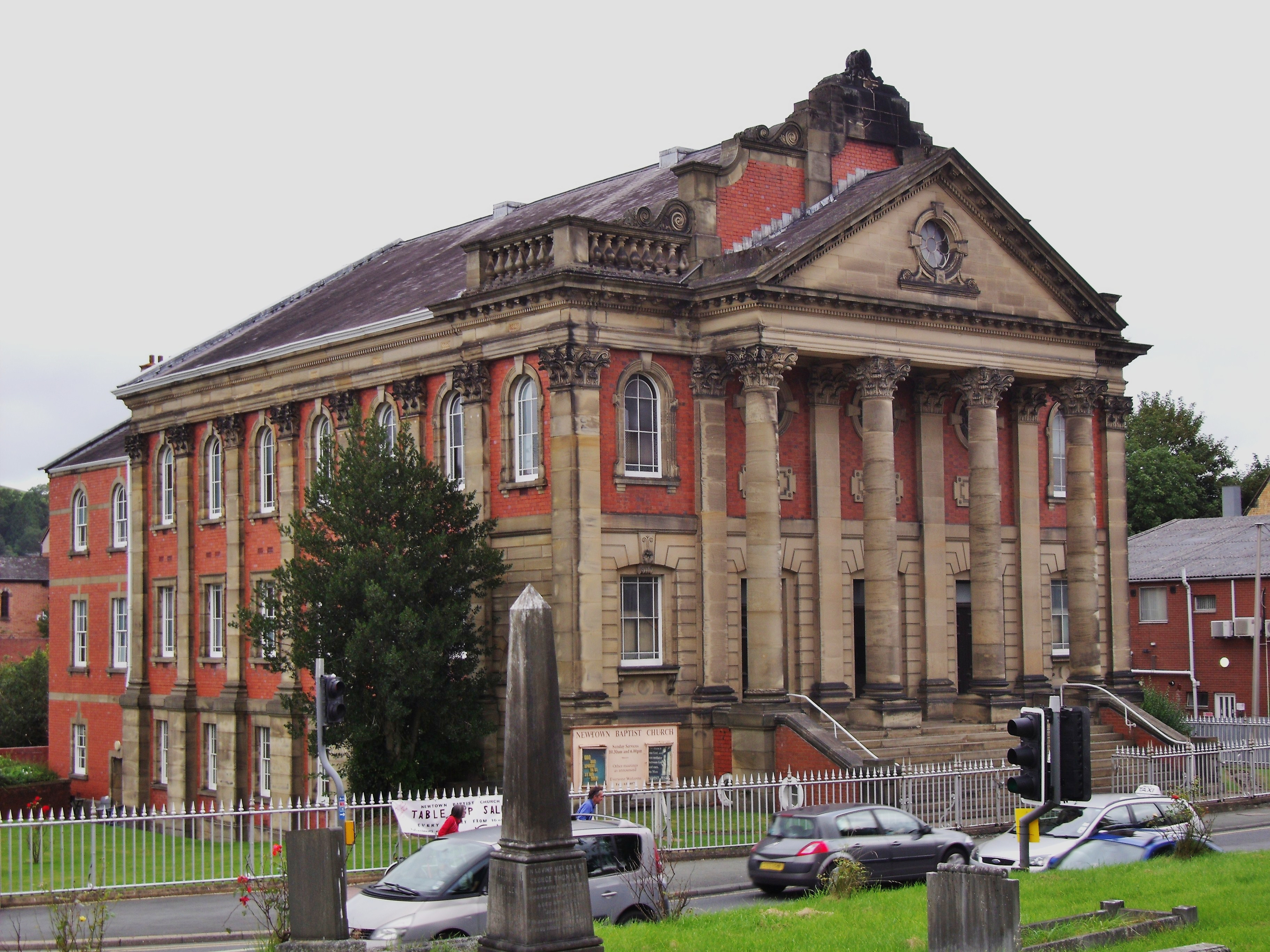
Zion Baptist Tabernacle, Newtown in 2012; built 1881

The Carmarthen School of Art in 2011; built 1891–1892

Barclays Bank building on Guildhall Square, Carmarthen in 2008; built 1900–1903

=== John Howard Morgan ===
John Howard Morgan (1865–1931) was George Morgan's son, and they worked together at George Morgan & Son.

He was born in Carmarthen in 1865. He studied under Thomas Charles Sorby in London and attended University College, London and the Architectural Association Schools. He worked as an assistant to his father in 1884, and, in 1885, he commenced practice as an independent architect at G. Morgan & Son. He was elected a Fellow of the Royal Institute of British Architects in 1906. He lived and worked at 24 King Street until his death on 11 February 1931.

He designed country houses in Pembrokeshire and Cardiganshire, including Bush House in Pembroke for Sir Thomas Meyrick (rebuilt in c. 1906), as well as bank premises and schools in Carmarthen and Cardigan, and masonic halls, parsonages and churches.

He specialised in Free Style, with examples at Bethania Calvinistic Methodist Chapel, Carmarthen (a branch of Capel Heol Dŵr built in 1902; designed alongside his father) and Gosen Chapel, Llangadog (remodelled in 1906–1907). He also built Penuel Baptist Chapel, Priory Street, Carmarthen (rebuilt in 1909–10), Babell Calvinistic Methodist Chapel at Pensarn (built in 1906), and Ramoth Baptist Chapel at Cwmfelin Mynach (built in 1907). He later modernised, building Bethania Welsh Presbyterian Church in Ferryside (built in 1911-1913), Smyrna Independent Chapel in Llangain (enlarged in 1915), and Capel y Drewen in Cwn Cou, Beulah (built in 1920–1921).

As well as churches, he designed Barclays Bank at 35 Main Street, Pembroke (remodelled in 1925), and the Masonic Hall at 37 Spilman Street, Carmarthen (built in 1911).

Examples of J. H. Morgan's buildings
Bush House, Pembroke in 2008; rebuilt c. 1906

Gosen Chapel, Llangadog in 2011; remodelled 1906–1907

Ramoth Chapel, Cwmfelin Mynach in 2024; built 1907

Masonic Hall, Carmarthen in 2021; built 1911

Smyrna Chapel, Llangain in 2021; enlarged 1915

=== William Vincent Morgan ===
William Vincent Morgan (1875–1957) was George Morgan's son. He articled at George Morgan & Son.

He was born in Carmarthen in 1875. He studied under his father and brother, J. H. Morgan, at George Morgan & Son between 1893 and 1898 and attended the Architectural Association Schools. He worked as an assistant to Alfred Burnell Burnell (c. 1860–1910) in 1898 and to Alexander Paul McAlister (1870–1937) in 1899, until he qualified as an architect in 1900. In 1901, he was elected an Associate of the Royal Institute of British Architects and began working as an independent architect in Carmarthen. At this time, he lived at 24 King Street, but he moved elsewhere in Carmarthen before 1920. In 1907, he was appointed as architect to Carmarthenshire County Council. He died in Tenby on 6 March 1957.

He designed schools and small holdings in Carmarthenshire. In 1908–1909, he altered the interior of Carmarthen Guildhall, including entirely remodelling the courtroom.

== Offices ==
24 King Street, Carmarthen in 2018

George Morgan & Son was based at 24 King Street, Carmarthen. The building was built in the earlier 19th century. It was a public house called Seren Cymru (transl. Star of Wales). By 1884, it was being used as the office of George Morgan, and, in 1926, it was being used by his son, J. Howard Morgan. In 2002, it was an antique shop with offices above. It is a grade II listed building.

== Legacy ==
The Carmarthen Civic Society put up blue plaques to honour George Morgan on the English Baptist Church and Oriel Myrddin.
