= David Thomas (Dafydd Ddu Eryri) =

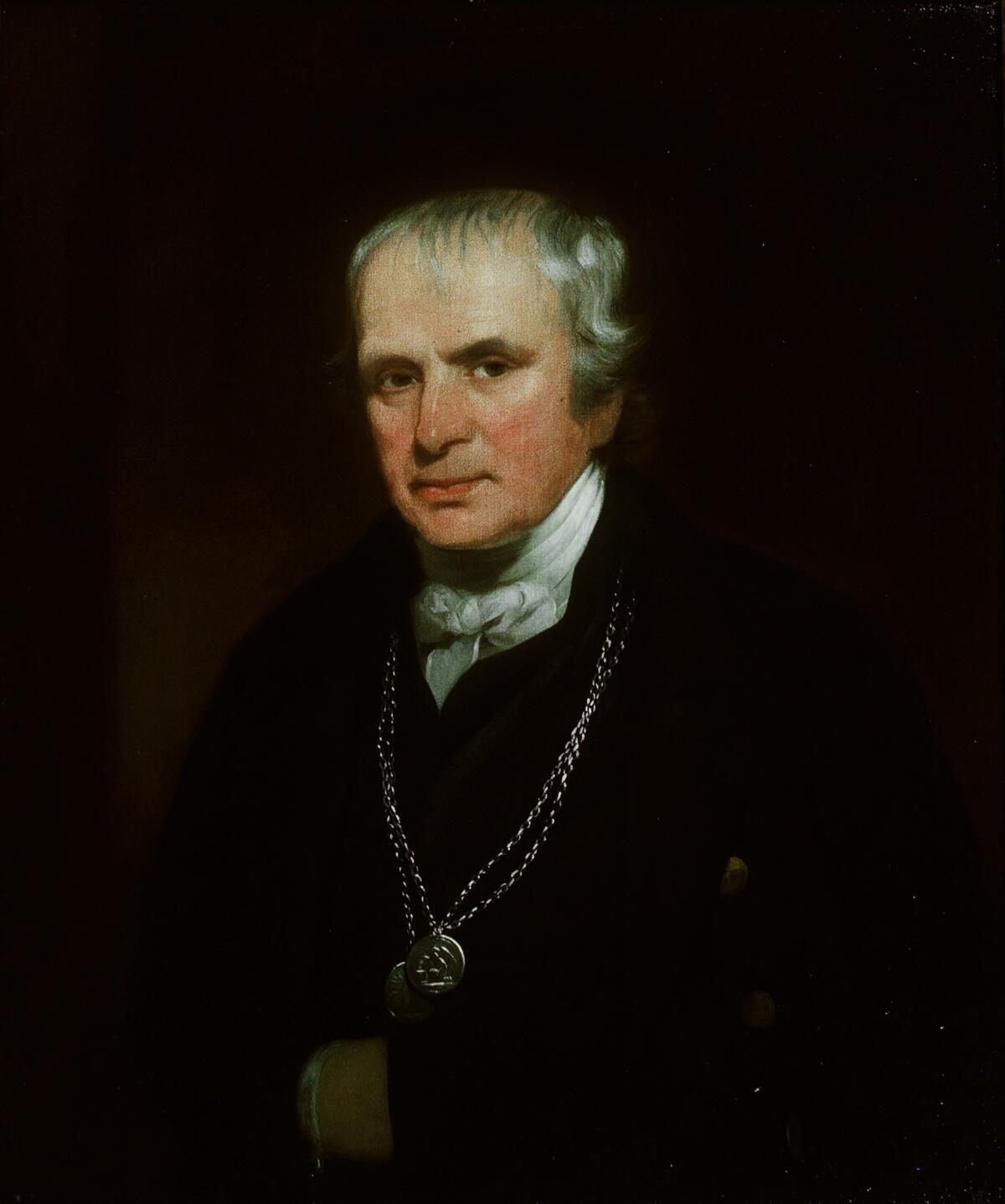
- Born: April 1759; Waunfawr
- Died: 30 March 1822 (aged 62); Afon Cegin
- Resting place: Llanrug
- Occupation: Poet
- Relatives: Humphrey Thomas

David Thomas, better known by his bardic name Dafydd Ddu Eryri, (April 1759 – 30 March 1822) was a Welsh poet and teacher of poets.

== Early life ==
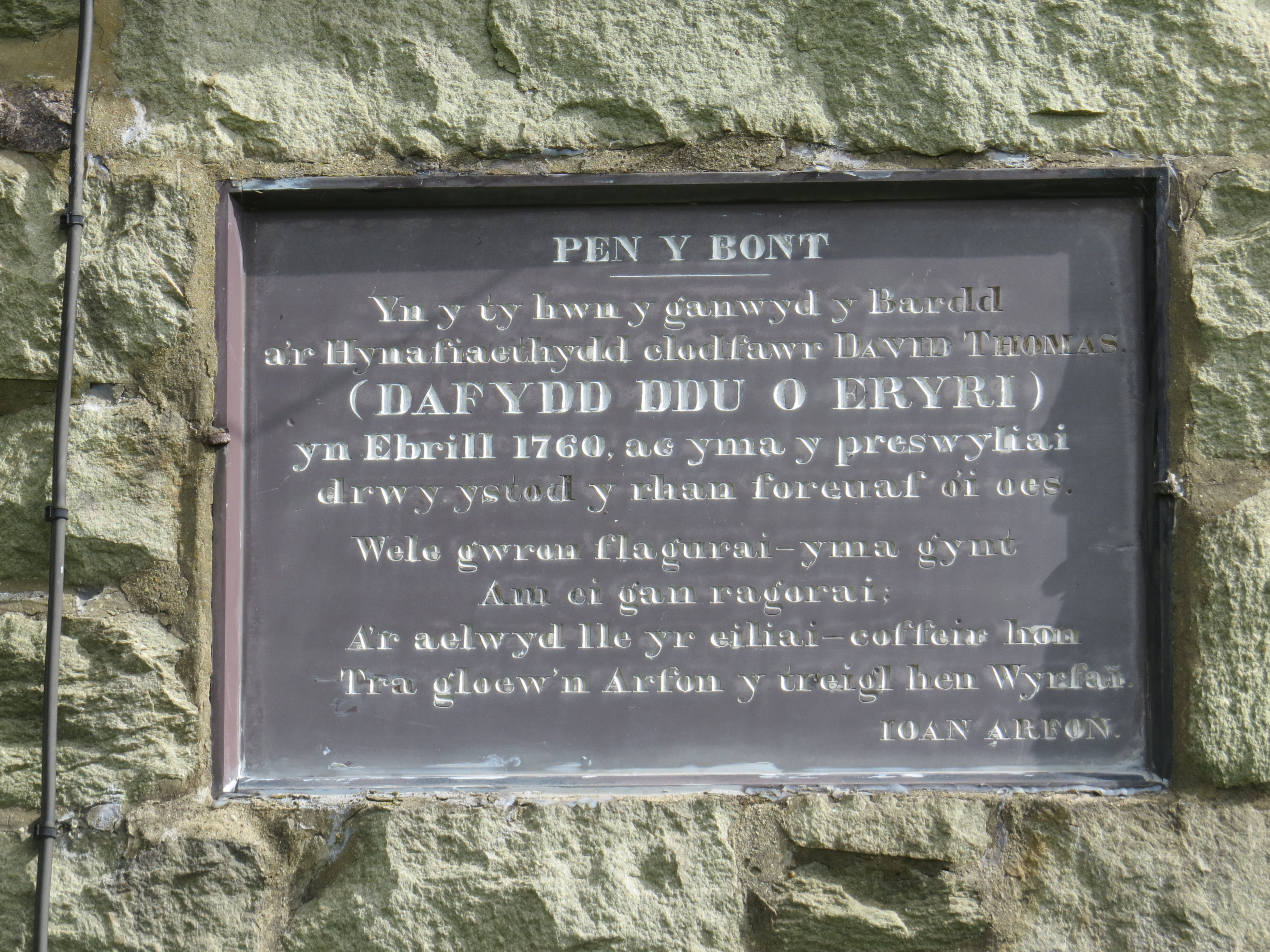
Plaque on the home of Dafydd Du in Waunfawr

Thomas was born in April 1759 in Waunfawr. He received a little basic education from a local cleric, who introduced him to the study of Welsh poetry. His father, Thomas Griffith, was a weaver and Calvinistic Methodist. After leaving school, David Thomas also became a weaver.

== Career ==
In 1787, he retired from weaving and became a schoolteacher in Llanddeiniolen. Through the rest of his life, he worked at many different schools in the area, including Llanrug where he spent the last part of his life. As a teacher, he was strict and sometimes angry.

== Literary work ==
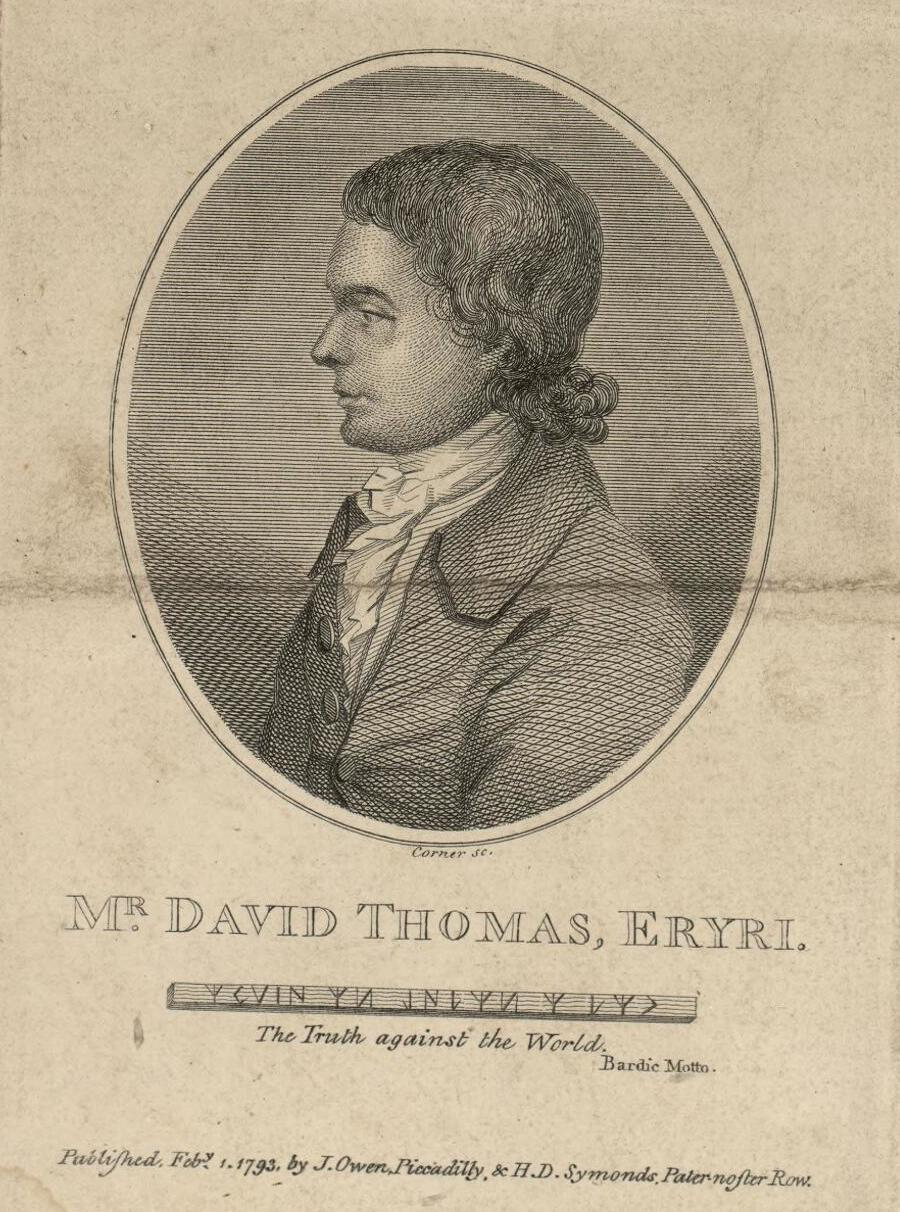
Portrait of David Thomas (Dafydd Ddu), Eryri

Thomas was well-known in his day for his odes, carols, and moral and religious poems. He became an important figure in the culture of his area, upholding the standards of poetry and teaching many local poets.

In 1783 he established literary societies in different parts of Arfon to promote poetry and raise the literary standards of his region, including the Cymdeithas yr Eryron, which met at the Tafarn y Bull in Pontnewydd.

He won the silver medal for his ode Rhyddid (English: Freedom) at the eisteddfod of the Gwyneddigion in St Asaph, 1790. Although of little literary value, it expresses a strong opposition to slavery. He won another prize at the Gwyneddigion eisteddfod in Llanrwst, 1791.

Although he spent some time in the circle of the Gwyneddigion, he could not reconcile with the radicalism of the movement and the strange ideas of William Owen Pughe about the Welsh language and its spelling.

He wrote 17 articles for Morgan John Rhys' radical periodical Cylchgrawn Cymraeg which was printed between 1793 and 1794.

In 1795, he organized an eisteddfod in Penmorfa.

He became a Bard of the Gorsedd on Dinorwig Hill in October 1799.

A selection of the poet's work was published in the volume Corff y Gainc in 1810.

He created a circle of students that included Griffith Williams (Gutyn Peris), known as the Cywion Dafydd Ddu. Although there isn't a lot of brilliance in their work by today's critical standards, these local poets, many of whom were quarrymen or smallholders, played an important role in maintaining the tradition of the eisteddfod and the rules of cerdd dafod in the quarry and farming communities in Eryri in the 19th century, especially in the Dyffryn Nantlle and Llanberis areas.

== Death ==
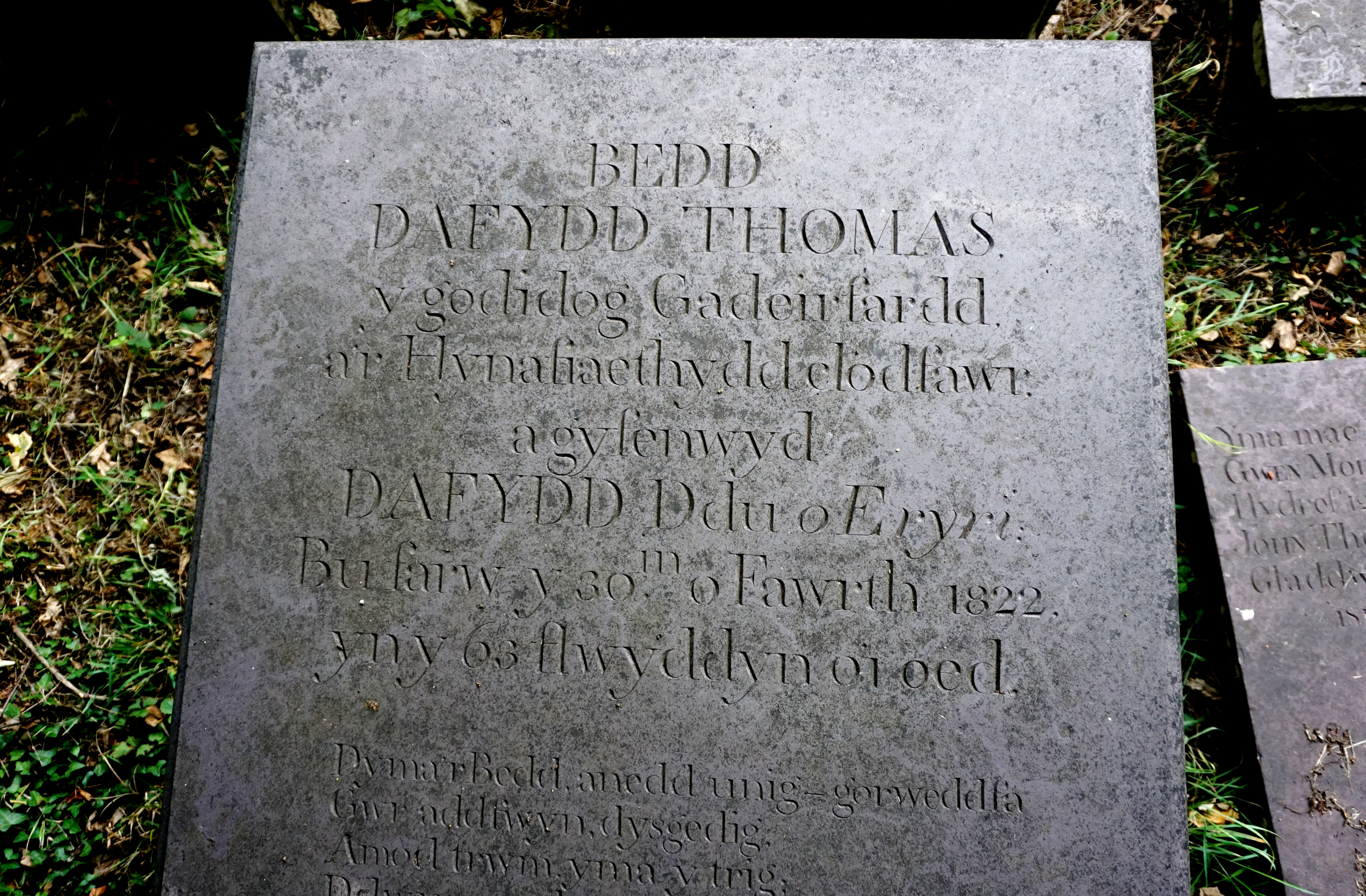
Grave of Dafydd Ddu Eryri in St Michael's Churchyard, Llanrug, Gwynedd

On the night of 30 March 1822, a stormy night, Thomas walked home to Llanrug from Bangor after visiting some literary clerics of Anglesey. While trying to cross the River Cegin near Pentir, he fell and drowned in a few feet of water. His body was found the following day near the causeway he had been trying to cross.

He was buried in the cemetery of Llanrug, and a memorial column was erected there by his benefactor Peter Bailey Williams, a local of the parish, to mark his grave.

The following was written to mark his death:

Hon ydyw'r afon, ond nid hwn yw'r dŵr
A foddodd Ddafydd Ddu.
This is the river, but this is not the water
That drowned Dafydd Ddu.

— Ymson Ynghylch Amser (1938) by R. Williams Parry
