= Cylchgrawn Cymraeg =

Y Cylchgrawn Cymraeg
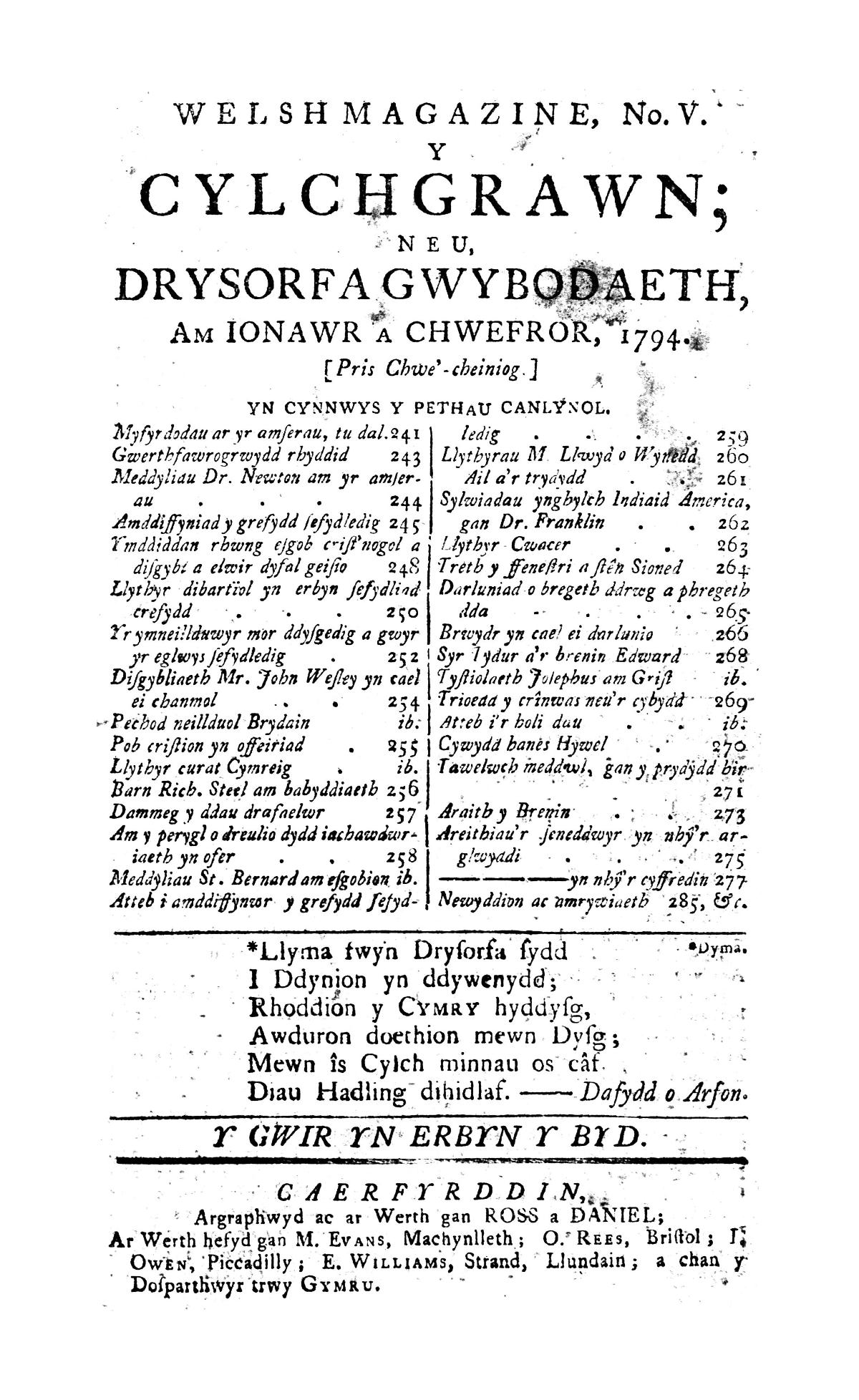
- Editor: Morgan John Rhys
- Categories: religion, politics, history, poetry, biographies, news
- Frequency: quarterly in 1793; bimonthly in 1794
- First issue: February 1793
- Final issue: 1794
- Country: Wales, United Kingdom
- Language: Welsh

Y Cylchgrawn Cymraeg; neu Drysorfa Gwybodaeth (also known as Cylch-grawn Cynmraeg; English: The Welsh Magazine; or Treasury of Information) was an 18th-century Welsh-language magazine, first produced by Morgan John Rhys in 1793. It was the first Welsh-language political magazine, and contained articles on religious and political subjects, as well as poetry, biographies and some general news. Amongst its contributors was poet David Thomas (Dafydd Ddu Eryri).

This magazine should not be confused with the 19th-century religious magazine Y Cylchgrawn published in Swansea from 1844–1894.

== History ==
The magazine was started by Baptist minister Morgan John Rhys in February 1793. He used it to share his ideas on controversial political issues on the slave trade, the missionary movement and the French Revolution, as well as abolishing the class system and pacifism.

The magazine was originally published in Trefeca, with later issues being published by other printers due to fear of persecution, including Evans of Machynlleth. The fifth issue (dated January and February 1794) was published by Ross and Daniel of Carmarthen.

Only five issues were published, with Rhys leaving for America in August 1794, possibly fleeing due to ideas shared in the magazine.
