= John Ross (printer) =

Welsh printer (c. 1729 – 1807)

- Born: c. 1729
- Died: October 1807 (aged 77–78)
- Occupation: Printer, publisher

John Ross (c. 1729 – 1 October 1807) was a Welsh publisher and printer, originally from Scotland. He was one of the busiest printers in Wales during his working life and published three editions of Peter Williams' Bible.

== Early life ==
Ross was born in Scotland around 1729.

== Career ==
Ross apprenticed as a printer in London and started printing in Carmarthen in 1763, working for a couple of years with Rhys Thomas. He was the first trained printer in Wales.

Between 1764 and 1772, he worked on Lammas Street, then moved to Priory Street. In 1781, he returned to Lammas Street.

Ross published the first edition of Beibl Peter Williams (English: Peter Williams' Bible) in 1770. It was the first Bible to be published in Wales.

In 1771, he published the medical book Pob Dyn ei Physygwr ei Hun, a Welsh translation of the book Every Man his Own Physician by John Theobald.

In the late 18th century, he co-published a few books with his former-apprentice John Daniel, including issue no. 3 of the periodical Cylchgrawn Cymraeg in 1793.

Ross continued working until the year of his death.

== Personal life ==
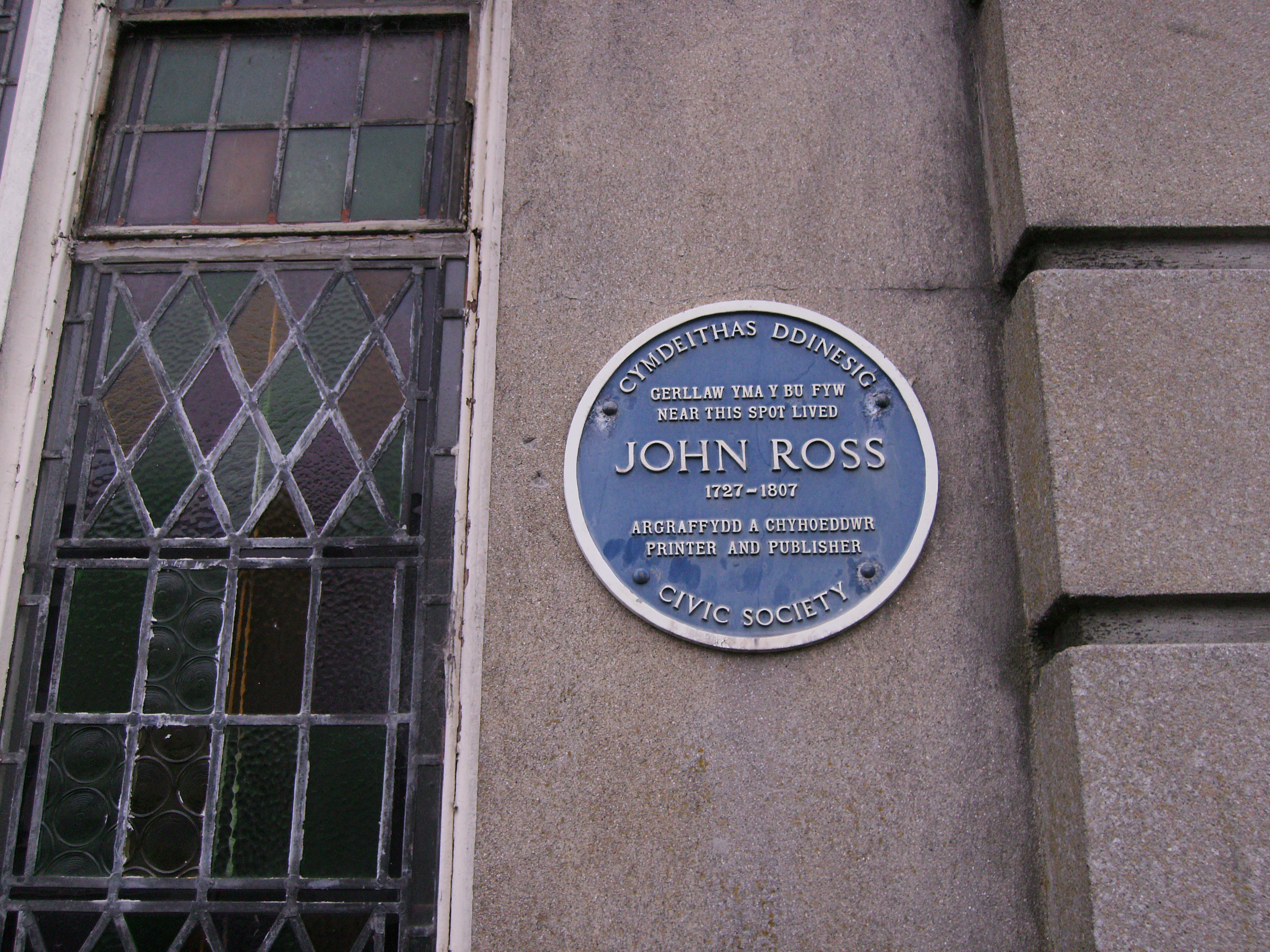
Blue plaque for John Ross on the wall of Capel Heol Awst on Lammas Street, Carmarthen

Ross was a dissenter and one of the trustees of Capel Heol Awst in 1781.

In 1785, he was one of the two sheriffs of Carmarthen.

== Death ==
John Ross died in Carmarthen in the last week of October 1807, aged 78. His daughter (or sister), Ann Scott, kept the business going for a while after Ross' death; she died on 24 September 1842, aged 107.
