= Penuel Baptist Chapel, Carmarthen =

Church in Carmarthenshire, Wales

Penuel Baptist Chapel
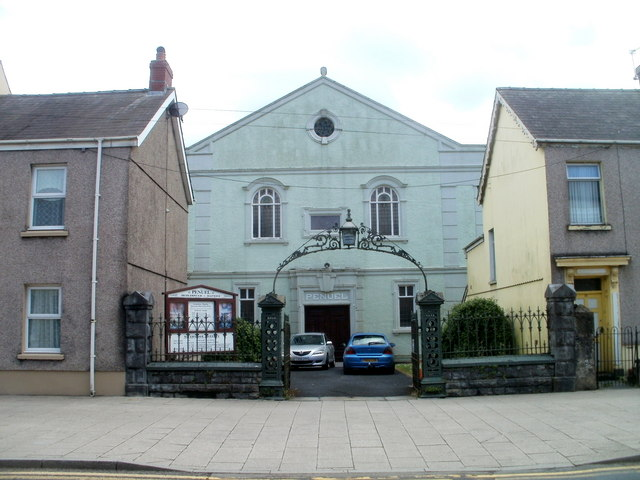
- Penuel Baptist Chapel
- 51.8599°N 4.2992°W
- Location: Priory Street, Carmarthen
- Country: Wales
- Denomination: Baptist (no longer active)
- Website: rowtonsmuseum.co.uk

Architecture
- Heritage designation: Grade II
- Designated: 9 February 1999
- Architectural type: Chapel

Penuel Baptist Chapel, Carmarthen is a Baptist chapel and attached schoolroom in the town of Carmarthen, Carmarthenshire, Wales. The building dates from 1786 and is located on Priory Street, Carmarthen. It ceased being a Baptist chapel in July 2024.

In October 2024, the chapel reopened to the public as Rowtons' Museum, a museum of the paranormal and spirituality owned and operated by the researchers Erik and Laura Rowton. Penuel also serves as an independent and multi-faith place of spiritual and religious worship, rooted in Spiritualist and Hermetic traditions. Gatherings focused on contemplative meditation and spiritual discussion are hosted at the chapel once a week.

== History ==
Penuel Baptist Chapel can trace its origin to 1757, when linen-draper and part-time preacher Stephen Davies founded the first chapel on the opposite side of the road to Penuel's current location. Situated in Old Chapel Yard, the congregation was granted formal incorporation by the Baptist Association in 1778, with Davies as their pastor. Over the next several years, monies were raised for the building of a new chapel, which allowed the site to be purchased in 1786. The building was extended in 1797, before being rebuilt in 1817 and again in 1851–52.

An adjoining schoolroom was added in 1886, built by the celebrated architect George Morgan of Carmarthen. The schoolroom hosted a variety of activities, including Temperance Society meetings, debates hosted by the Young People's Guild, and, in 1896, a two-hour lecture on "The Science of Phrenology".

In 1909–10, Penuel Chapel was fully renovated, to such an extent that only the walls and roof remained from the previous building. Much of its current interior, including the organ and exceptional Canadian redwood pews and galleries, date from that time.

=== Supernatural occurrences ===
Under Rev. William Samuel Jones, who moved from the United States to Carmarthen in 1897 in order to head the congregation at Penuel, the chapel is said to have witnessed many supernatural "manifestations" and instances of "divine healing". Jones is also described as having experienced an ecstatic "baptism of power" during his time at Penuel. Miracles and supernatural manifestations were reported as having often been witnessed by the congregation at the chapel, so much so that by 1904 it was "common knowledge that they regarded medicine and surgery with contempt" in favour of mysticism and faith healing.

According to writer and preacher Michael Marcel of Wells UK, Rev. Jones would have been "transformed" by his two "baptism of power" experiences, with Marcel noting that, historically, those who had experienced such "went from being an ordinary preacher to an extraordinary one". Jones' supernatural experiences and personal claim of "divine healing" from a medical condition are credited as contributing to the Welsh Revival of 1904-5, a movement which relied primarily on alleged supernatural phenomena, exemplified by the visions of the Welsh evangelist prophet Evan Roberts.

== Architecture ==
Penuel Baptist Chapel is set back from the road by a stout iron railing fence. The chapel has a broad gabled facade and a large, uncluttered interior in a classical style. It has galleries on all four sides, the downward-pointing timber posts creating quasi-aisles. The corners of the galleries are curved and the fronts of the galleries have panels with balustrades. The organ is in a recess on one of the galleries and underneath this there is a free classical arcaded pulpit behind which is a curved and panelled back with pediments.

The church was designated as a Grade II listed building on 9 February 1999, being "a chapel of early origins with exceptional early C20 interior, unusual for the 2-storey arcades". At the time of its renovation in 1910 it was stated that the chapel could accommodate 800 people and was designed in such a way that the occupiers of any pew on the ground and gallery floors have a full view of the pulpit and organ.
