= Oriel Myrddin Gallery =

Art gallery in Carmarthen, Wales

Coordinates: 51°51′28″N 4°18′12″W

Oriel Myrddin
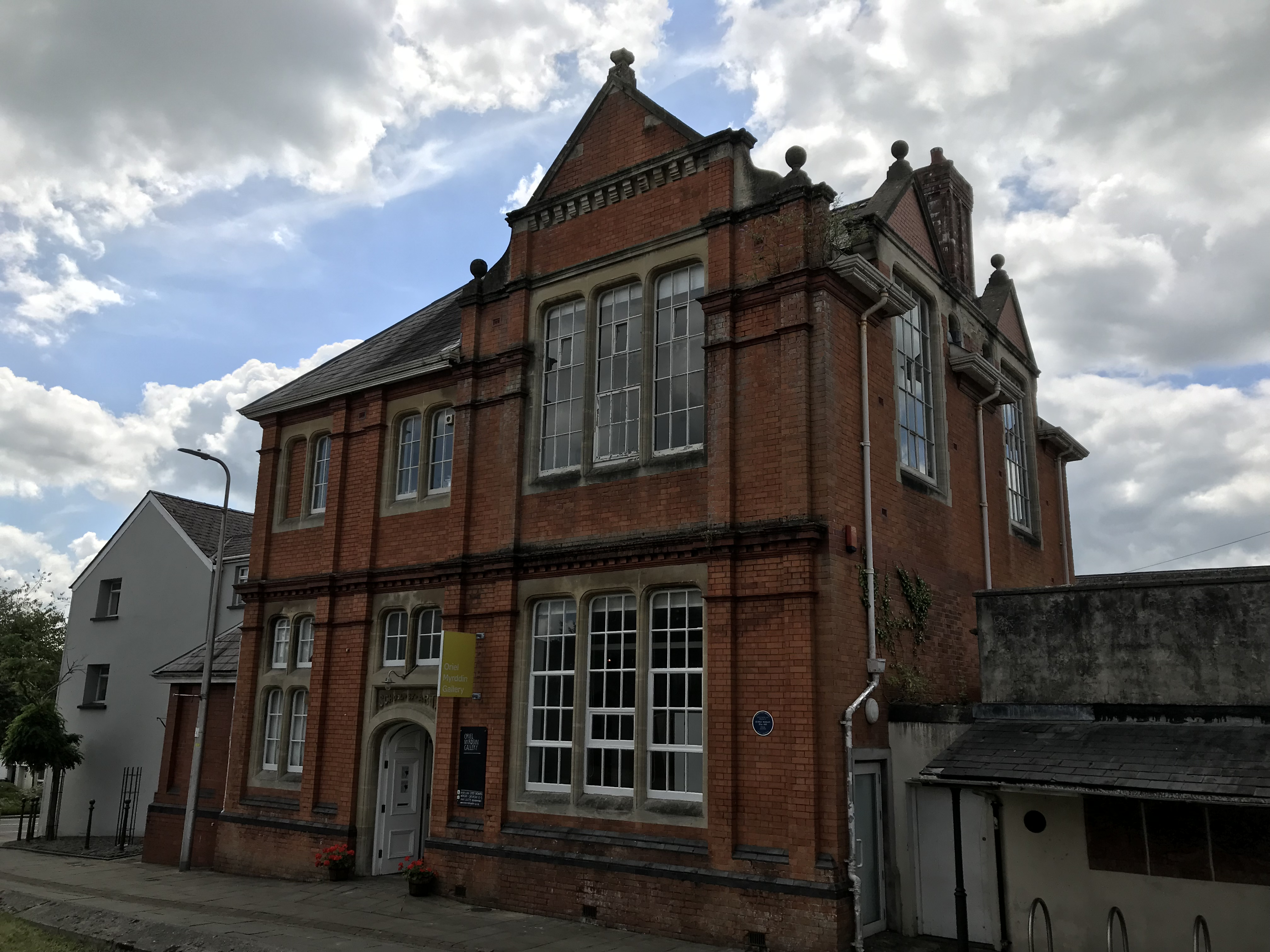
- The Oriel Myrddin building viewed from Church Lane in 2018
- Former names: Carmarthen Art School

General information
- Location: 26-27 King Street, Carmarthen, SA31 1LH
- Groundbreaking: 1891
- Completed: 1892
- Renovated: 1991, 2025

Design and construction
- Architecture firm: George Morgan & Son, 24 King Street
- Main contractor: Thomas Morris, Water Street

Listed Building – Grade II
- Official name: Oriel Myrddin (The Old Art School)
- Designated: 21 August 1984
- Reference no.: 9734

Oriel Myrddin Gallery is an art gallery in Carmarthen, Wales. Its building previously housed the Carmarthen School of Art.

== History ==
=== Carmarthen School of Art ===
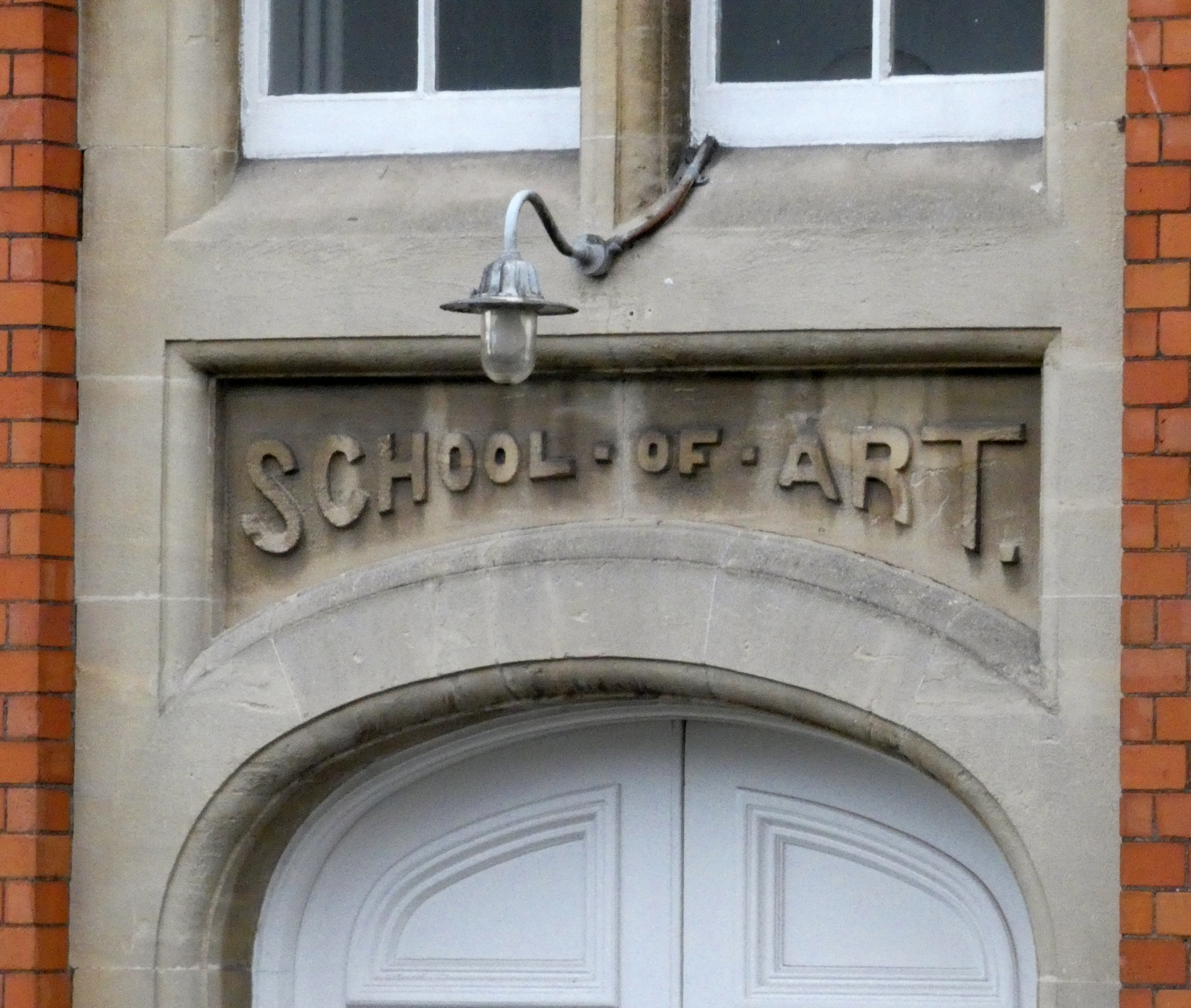
"School of Art" engraving on the Oriel Myrddin building in 2021

The Carmarthen School of Art was founded in 1854. It closed briefly in the 1870s but reopened in 1880. A new building in Church Lane was first proposed in 1888, and the school moved to the building that now houses Oriel Myrddin on 22 September 1892.

The building was included in a project to photograph the most notable buildings in Carmarthen in case they became damaged during World War II.

In the 1950s, the Art School moved to College Road and, in 1971, Carmarthen School of Art became the Dyfed College of Art.

=== Oriel Myrddin Art Gallery ===
The building that now houses Oriel Myrddin opened as a gallery in December 1991.

The building was renovated between July 2022 and November 2025, moving its entrance from Church Lane to King Street.

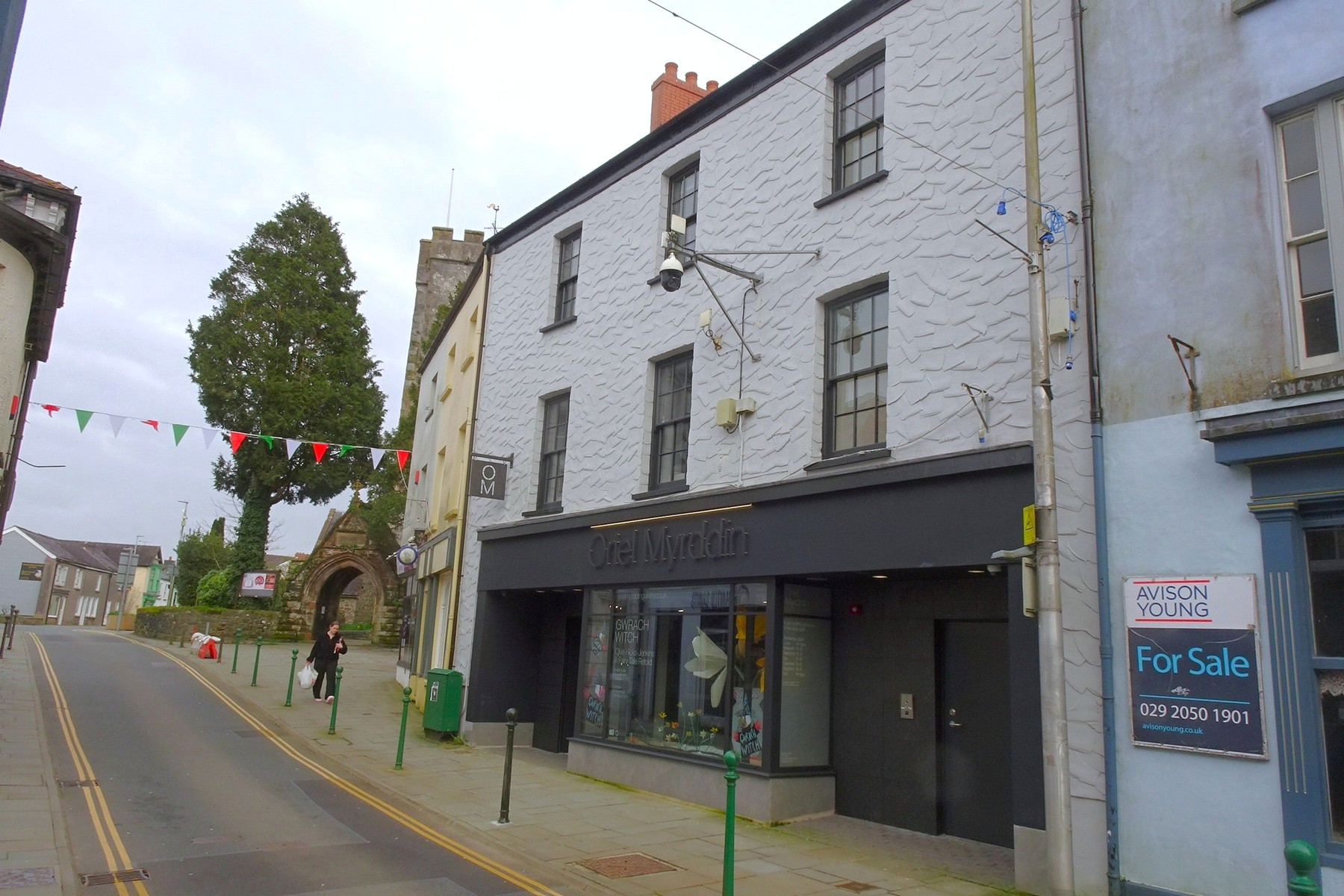
New entrance to Oriel Myrddin on King Street in 2026

== Building ==
The building housing Oriel Myrddin is a Grade II listed building built between 1891 and 1892.

George Morgan & Son of 24 King Street was the architect, and Thomas Morris of Water Street was the builder. It was the first purpose-built art school in Wales and built in the modern Renaissance style.

== Present day ==
The gallery was chosen to contribute to the Cymru yn Fenis / Wales in Venice exhibition at Venice Biennale 2026.
