= Carmarthen Workhouse =

Workhouse in Carmarthen attacked during the Rebecca Riots

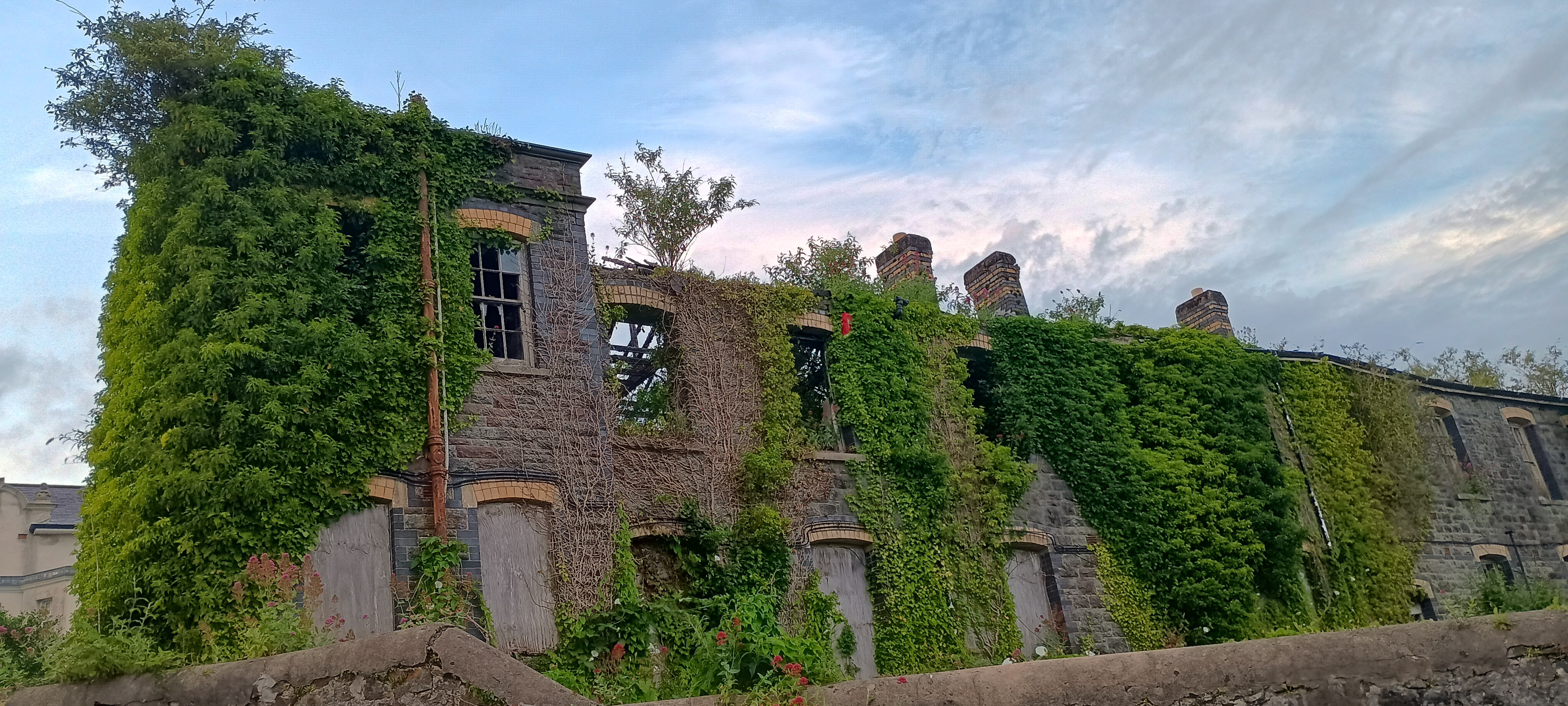
- Interactive map of the Carmarthen Workhouse area
- Alternative names: Carmarthen Union Workhouse

General information
- Location: 1 Penlan Road, Carmarthen, Wales
- Coordinates: 51.860851°N 4.308924°W
- Year built: originally built in 1805; enlarged in 1837
- Renovated: extended in 1839-1840; extended in 1879-1890s; rebuilt in 1907-1908

Design and construction
- Architect: Thomas Evans

Renovating team
- Architects: J. L. Collard (1839-1840); George Morgan (1879-1890s); Arthur I. Jones (1907-1908)
- Main contractor: Mr. Rees Davies (1907-1908)

Carmarthen Workhouse (also known as Carmarthen Union Workhouse) was a workhouse in Carmarthen, South Wales, UK. It was attacked during the Rebecca Riots in 1843.

== History ==
A poorhouse was opened in Carmarthen in 1805. It was renamed as a workhouse in 1821. The Carmarthen Poor Law Union was formed on 2 July 1836. In October 1836, plans were made to enlarge the 1805 building, keeping the gatehouse from the earlier building. The workhouse building was built in the 1830s, in response to the Poor Law Act 1834, requiring parishes to look after their own poor. The enlarged workhouse was opened in 1837.

=== Rebecca Riots ===
The workhouse was stormed by protesters during the Rebecca Riots to protest against the New Poor Law of 1834. This was a turning point in the riots, as previous attacks had been on tollgates. On 19 June 1843, rioters forced the workhouse master to hand over his keys. The protesters wrecked the workhouse, smashing furniture and windows. There were 500 protesters on horses and 2000 on foot.

Five troops of the 4th (Queen's Own) Light Dragoons were ordered to march into South Wales from Exeter to control the Rebecca Riots. They marched to Carmarthen from Cardiff. The dragoons used a cavalry charge to end the riot. This was the last cavalry action in Britain. As a result, 60 protesters were taken prisoner.

=== 20th century ===
At the start of the 20th century, the workhouse became more commonly known as No. 1 Penlan Road. Birth certificates used this address to avoid future disadvantage to those born at the workhouse. The workhouse's buildings were used as an Auxiliary Military Red Cross Hospital during World War I. During the war, rationing meant residents at the workhouse received less bread, substituted by porridge at breakfast and rice at dinner.

The building stopped being used as a workhouse in the 1930s. It became a Public Assistance Institute. Troops were stationed at the workhouse during World War II.

The building was used as a hospital, known as Penlan Hospital, which had 38 beds for the elderly and chronically sick. It closed in 1972 when Carmarthen Infirmary reopened for geriatric patients.

Towards the end of the 20th century, the building was used by Carmarthenshire Council, the BBC and local charities.

=== Fires ===
- In February 1844, there was a fire at the Carmarthen Workhouse. It was extinguished by a party of the 76th Regiment stationed at the workhouse before the Carmarthen fire engines could arrive. It was believed to have been caused by a builder placing a rafter too close to a chimney.
- There was another fire at the workhouse on 26 March 1906. It broke out in the main building in the quarters of the master and matron, possibly caused by an inmate stirring the fire. At the time, the workhouse housed 103 inmates, but there were no casualties. An old chaplain's book from the days of the Rebecca Riots was saved from the fire.
- Yet another fire at the workhouse, on 2 March 2018, was extinguished by 20 firefighters. The fire heavily damaged the building. It was believed that the fire was started maliciously by two youths.

== Life at the workhouse ==
Inmates at the workhouse were required to wear a uniform and follow a repetitive routine. Men, women and children were confined to different parts of the building, which resulted in families being split up. Inmates were usually served a Christmas dinner of roast beef and plum pudding. However, in 1865, inmates were not given Christmas dinner. In 1868, a report stated that the accommodation at the workhouse was insufficient, with a lack of light and ventilation, particularly to the water-closet system. Inmates had straw beds. At the time, there was no infirmary, and sick inmates were treated on various wards in the main building.

=== Number of residents ===
When the workhouse was opened in 1837, it could house 140 inmates. In 1869, there were 92 "paupers" in the workhouse. In 1906, there were 88 residents. After the workhouse was rebuilt in 1908, it could accommodate 115 people.

== Staff ==
Masters and Matrons of Carmarthen Workhouse
Year	Master	Matron
1846	Henry Winchcombe	
1852	Mr Johns	Mrs Johns
1865	Thomas Furlong	
1868	Benjamin Jones	
1869	John Canton	Mrs Canton
1881-1901	Edwin Price	Margaret Price
1908-1913	Mr Rees Price	Mrs Rees Price

== Building ==
The workhouse building is located where Penlan Road meets Brewery Road. The foundation stone was laid in 1837 with Thomas Evans as the contractor. At the time, workhouse buildings were designed to look imposing and unpleasant. The building was extended in 1839-40 by J. L. Collard. In 1879, a new children's block was built, designed by George Morgan. The building was further extended by George Morgan through the 1880s and 1890s.

The main block building had to be demolished after the fire in 1906, as the existing walls were deemed unsafe to use. While removing debris from the site in preparation for rebuilding, a wall fell on a labourer, causing serious scalp injuries. The main block building was rebuilt in 1907-08 in a new layout. Mr. Rees Davies was the builder and Arthur I. Jones was the architect.

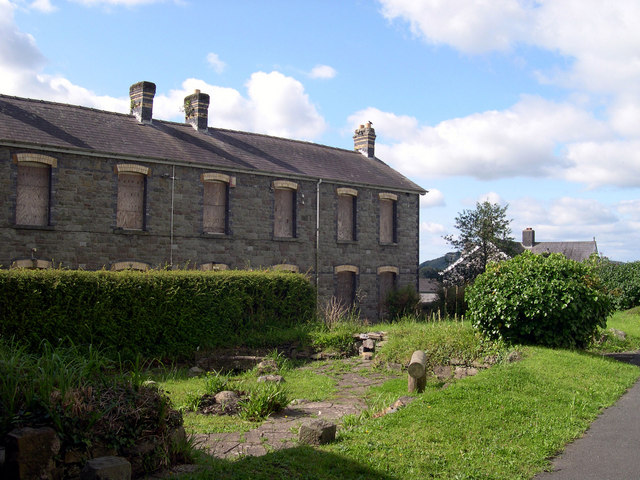
Disused buildings at the old Carmarthen Workhouse in 2009

Edgar and Jonathan Stephens took ownership in 2007 and obtained planning permission to turn the buildings into flats. They planned to sell to a developer but struggled to find one. Carmarthen Workhouse was on the market in 2015, with planning permission to convert into flats. It hadn't sold by 2019. By 2017, the buildings of Carmarthen Workhouse had fallen into disrepair.

After a fire in 2018, the state of the building was further degraded. The owners (still Edgar and Jonathan Stephens) were ordered to carry out repair works, but the building was still deteriorating in 2019, with worries that people walking near the building may be injured by failing tiles or masonry. An enforcement notice required them to fix the roof, chimneys and walls damaged by fire and reglaze windows by February 2020.

The building has a blue plaque from Carmarthen Civil Society to mark the Rebecca Riots attack on the workhouse. The gatehouse, possibly dating from the original 1805 poorhouse, is a Grade II listed building.

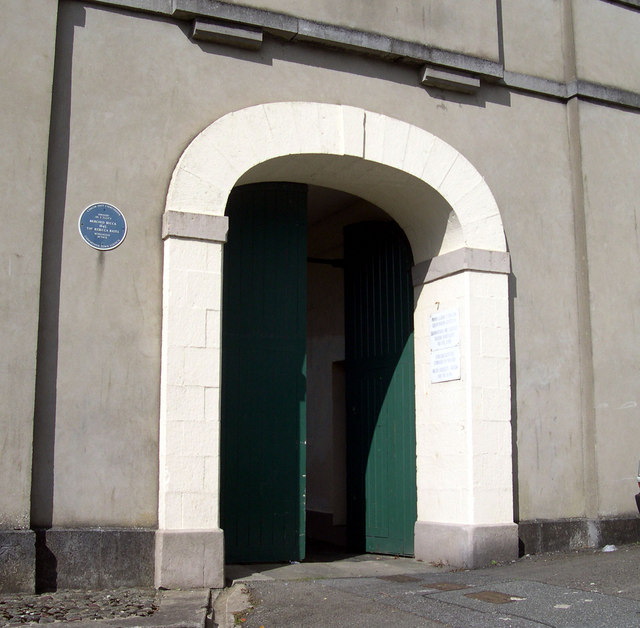
The Carmarthen Workhouse gatehouse, possibly dating from the original poorhouse, showing its blue plaque commemorating the attack on the workhouse during the Rebecca Riots in 2009
