= Beula, Pennsylvania =

Welsh ghost town in Pennsylvania, USA

Coordinates: 40°28′36″N 78°46′19″W

Beulah
- Ghost Town
- Beula
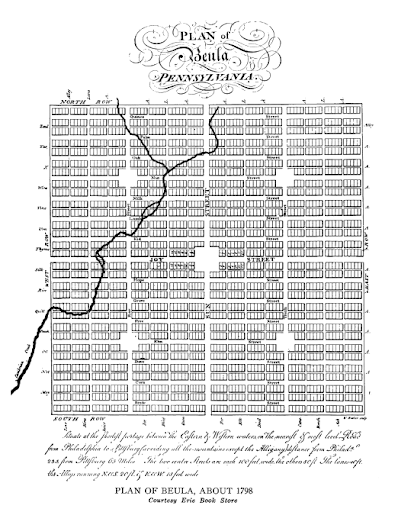
- Interactive map of Beulah
- Country: United States
- State: Pennsylvania
- County: Cambria County
- Settled: 1796
- Founder: Morgan John Rhys

Beula, or Beulah, Pennsylvania was a town that existed between 1796 and 1804 in Cambria County, Pennsylvania, founded by Welsh Minister Morgan John Rhys. The original settlers under the guidance of Rhys had bought the land from Dr. Benjamin Rush, in search of a home in the countryside. They originally planned on settling in western Ohio, but it took too long to secure land in that region, so the Pennsylvania tract was settled upon. Two members of Rhys's party would go on to found Paddy's Run, Ohio. Rhys intended for Beula to be a cattle range. The Welsh were inspired to settle down in America by their religion (being Welsh Dissenters), the politics of the era, and as well as the Prince Madoc myth - that a Welsh Prince had discovered America in the 1100s. It is one of the few ghost towns mentioned as a part of Pennsylvania's Ghost Town Trail.

== History ==
Welsh Baptist Minister Morgan John Rhys founded Beula in 1796. His vision was to establish a "gwladfa" (Welsh-speaking colony) for nonconformist sects of the time, such as Quakers and Baptists, where religion could be practiced in Welsh. In order to do this Rhys founded the Cambrian Company and purchased 17,400 acres (70 km^{2}) of land, 250 miles (400 km) west of Philadelphia from Dr. Benjamin Rush for £ 9,450. The land was thought to be well located between the Blacklick and Conemaugh rivers. It was the first Welsh settlement in the United States.

Arriving just a few months prior to the main party under Morgan John Rhys, was Rev. Rees Lloyd who would soon settle Ebensburg (then spelled Ebensburgh) some 3 miles (4.8 km) to the east. Lloyd's settlement was, for a time, part of Beula until land was sold on the fringes of the plot back to Benjamin Rush, subsequently purchased by Lloyd. Harsh winters made things difficult in the Allegheny wilderness, with many lacking appropriate equipment and poor diets. To make matters worse, the saw and grist mills failed, and not only once, but twice over the course of the coming winters. In a July 1798 letter to Dr. Rush, Rhys wrote:

What shall I say? I am charged not to write unless I scribble something that may appear in the print - but I must declare to you that we are not yet prepared to appear before the public. Our roads are yet to be cut, mills to be built, and many other improvements, which if not requisite to our existence are necessary to out existing comfortably. The freezing hand of winter has chilled and blasted many of our enterprises.

He mentions as well that he spent at least 1,000 dollars to repair the damaged mills. Interestingly, he makes reference in the letter that the men of the town have been so preoccupied with their work and harvesting "that your house has not yet begun," implying that Dr. Rush was getting a house in Beula. It is known that he owned three lots of land for donating glass for the local meeting house and books for the library, as well as Elias Boudinot who made various contributions. But this small reference to "your house" would certainly be a hint that Dr. Rush had perhaps intended to use Beula as a summer stay or cottage away from Philadelphia.

== Beula after its decline ==
Beula was a spot that locals often frequented for day trips, picnics, or walks. Known to them as "The Old Welsh Village" it kept up appearances until the 1850s, the local church operated until that point. However, there were little to no houses left and it was left in disarray and abandonment.

=== The Beula Ghost ===
The abandoned ghost town, in its long period of being left uninhabited sparked the infamous "Beula Ghost" story. Many locals claimed to have ghostly experiences, a number of which ended up in the papers of nearby Ebensburg. The Alleghenian ran a lengthy story about the ghost in February 1861. The writer penned that he was out hunting late into the evening before stopping to rest in one of the last abandoned houses in Beula. After some time, he felt an icy hand on his head, following which he saw "a form clad in a flowing... garment, with long waving hair, of snowy whiteness, and a face as calm and pale as death!" Then it spoke to him, saying "'Mortal, be not afraid, I seek not to harm thee nor trouble thy spirit. I am lonely and weary." After explaining that it was cursed to haunt Beula for loving "gold more than God", the spirit is apparently set free from its torment, or simply vanishes after lamenting its misery to a mortal being. Other incarnations of the haunting exist. An older news article claims that a man fishing on the Blacklick Creek which ran through Beula fell asleep and awoke to find his basket of fish empty and tipped over. He chalked it up to a spirit.

== Gallery ==
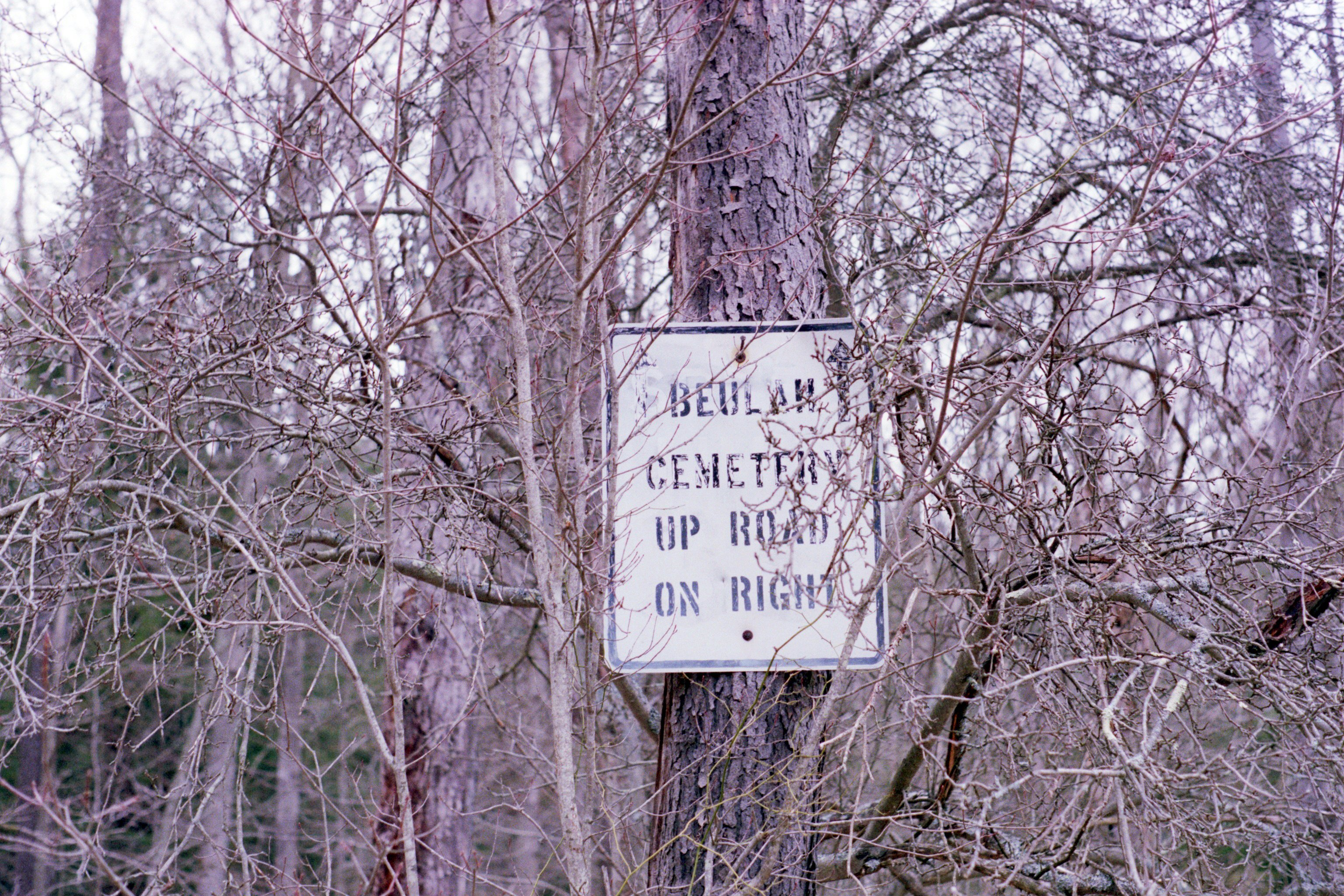

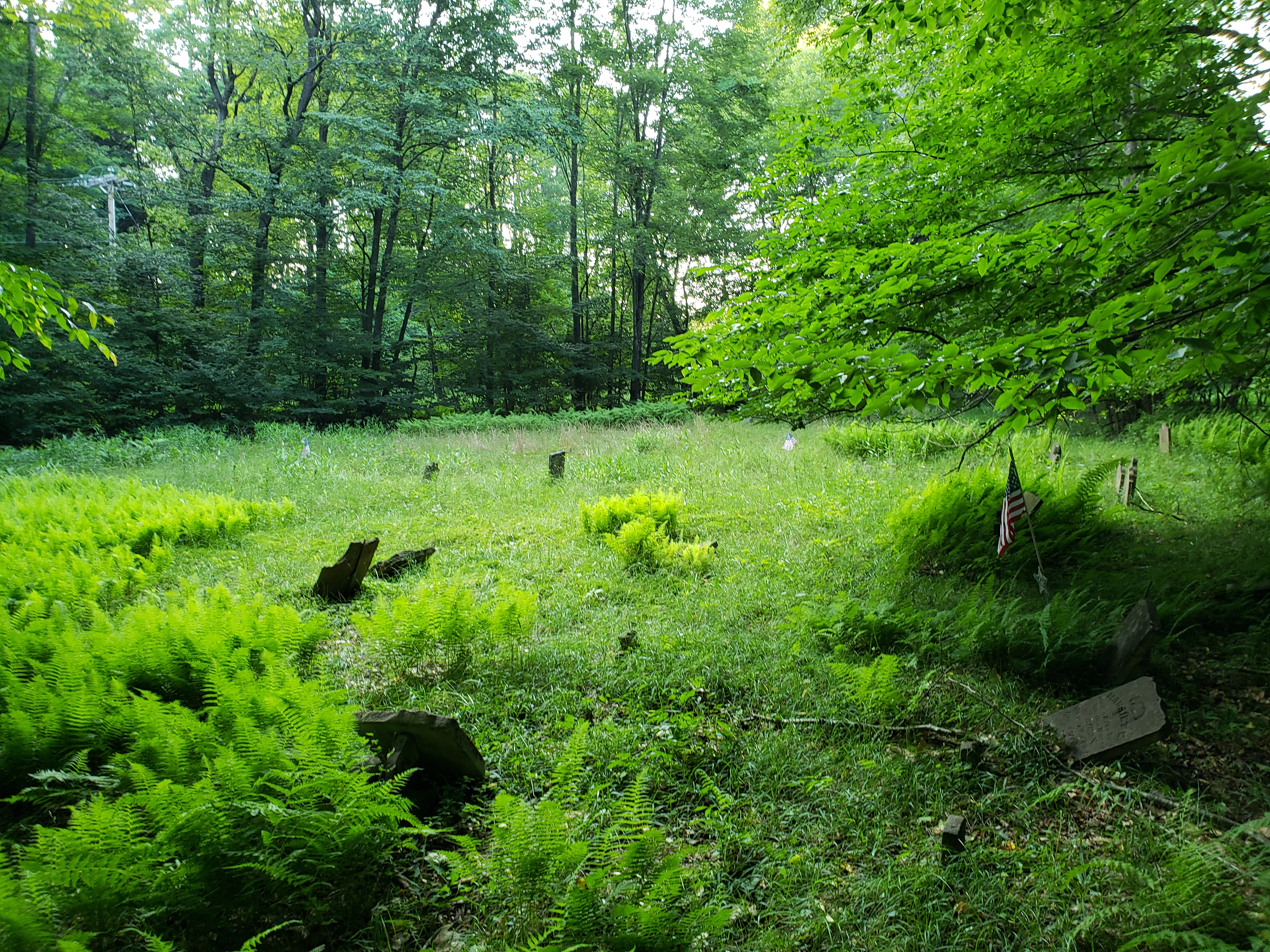

== See also ==
- List of ghost towns in Pennsylvania
- Ghost Town Trail
