= Carmarthen Infirmary =

Hospital in Carmarthen, Wales, operational 1847–1996

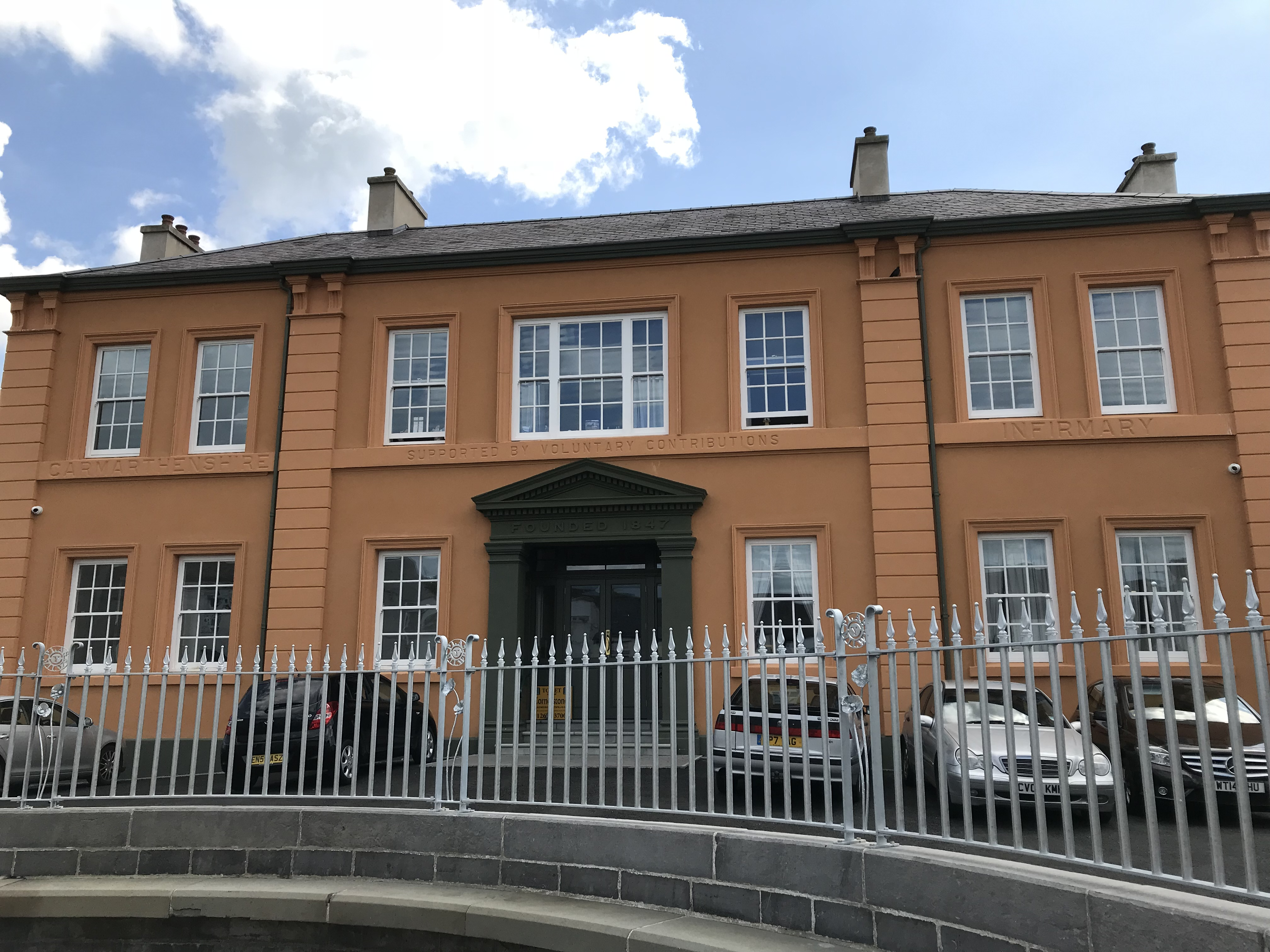
- Site of Carmarthen Infirmary after renovation into apartments in 2018

Geography
- Location: Priory Street, Carmarthen, Wales
- Coordinates: 51.8588°N 4.3007°W

History
- Former names: Priory Street Hospital; County and Borough of Carmarthen Infirmary; Carmarthen County Infirmary; Carmarthenshire Infirmary
- Founded: 25 December 1847
- Opened: 1 July 1858
- Closed: 31 March 1996

Links

Listed Building – Grade II
- Official name: Former Carmarthenshire Infirmary
- Designated: 19 May 1981
- Reference no.: 9542

Carmarthen Infirmary (also known as Priory Street Hospital and Carmarthenshire Infirmary; Welsh: Ysbyty Gaerfyrddin) was a hospital in Carmarthen, Wales, between 1847 and 1996. Originally housed in Carmarthen Jail, the infirmary moved to a new building on Priory Street in 1858. This building is one of the few remaining examples of a Victorian former infirmary and along with its gatepiers, it is protected as a listed building.

The hospital ran on voluntary contributions for almost a century until it was adopted into the National Health Service (NHS) in 1948. Between 1955 and 1968, the building was gradually retired as its services were moved to the newly redeveloped West Wales General Hospital. Priory Street Hospital reopened for geriatric patients in 1972 before closing in 1996. The site then became derelict and has since been redeveloped into housing.

== History ==
The creation of an infirmary intended to provide the sick poor with medical treatment in Carmarthen was proposed in 1841. This idea was considered again in the wake of the Rebecca Riots and particularly the rioters' attack on the Carmarthen Workhouse in 1843. The county administrators began discussions to provide an infirmary in 1846. Colonel Rice-Trevor proposed plans to temporarily house an infirmary in the Carmarthen Borough Gaol.

The use of the Borough Gaol, free of rent, be granted to the infirmary subscribers until more suitable premises be obtained and that notice be given to the Officers of the Gaol that their further services be discontinued and the salaries paid up to 25 December 1847.

— Carmarthen Town Council, Minutes of a meeting held 10 May 1847

Carmarthen Infirmary was founded on 25 December 1847 and was originally housed inside Carmarthen Jail with space for 12 patients. They were cared for by a house surgeon, matron, nurse and servant. Overcrowding was a common problem.

In 1855, plans were made to fix the overcrowding problem by building a new 30-bed infirmary on a site in Priory Street that had been occupied for the prior 250 years by Queen Elizabeth's Endowed Grammar School.

The purpose-built infirmary was opened on 1 July 1858, designed by William Wesley Jenkins. In that year, the hospital cost £601 to run.

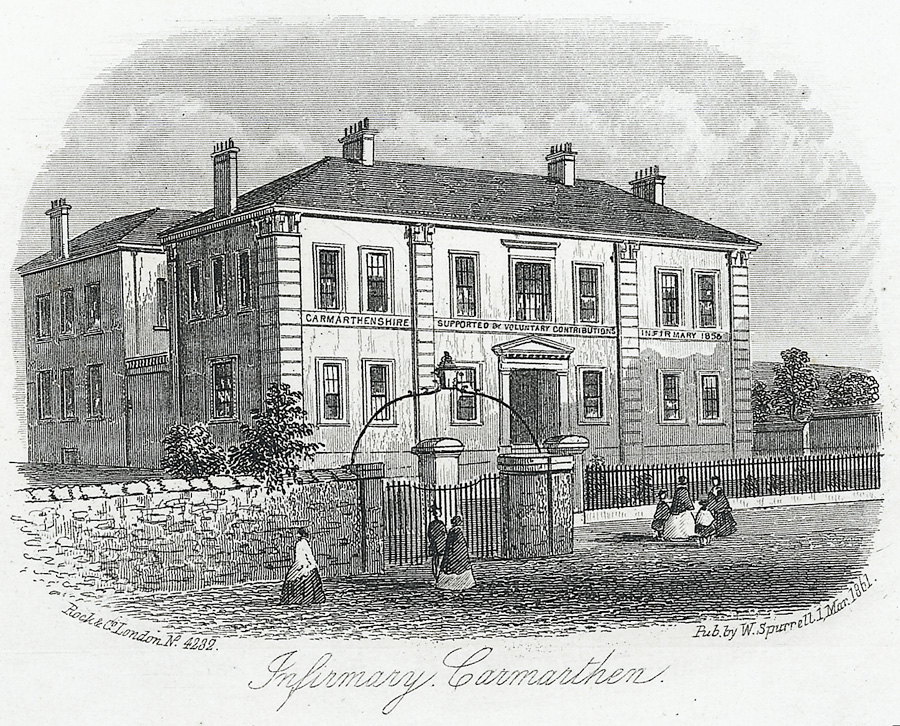
Carmarthen Infirmary in 1861

Rules in the new infirmary were strict, with patients not allowed to leave the infirmary and no swearing, smoking or card-playing allowed. Patients who were able to work were required to help with cleaning, laundry and caring for other patients.

Before 1912, visiting time was between 9 am and 4 pm on Wednesdays and Saturdays only. The visiting times changed to between 2 pm and 4 pm, with only two visitors per patient and a maximum visitation time of 30 minutes.

The hospital was taken over by the National Health Service upon its creation in 1948.

The NHS also purchased the old American Military Hospital at Glangwili to create the West Wales General Hospital. Carmarthen Infirmary became known as Priory Street Hospital. Instruments and equipment were shared between the two hospitals.

The West Wales General Hospital began redevelopment, with a new building built for a general theatre in 1954, and services transferred over from Priory Street Hospital as they became available at Glangwili. The Casualty Department at Carmarthen Infirmary was replaced by the new Accident and Emergency Department in Glangwili in 1960. The final departments to relocate were obstetrics and gynaecology and some general surgery. The West Wales General Hospital was fully operational by December 1968.

Priory Street Hospital was remodelled and reopened in 1972 for long-stay geriatric patients, allowing the Penlan Hospital in the Carmarthen Workhouse building to close.

In 1986, the planned closure of Priory Street Hospital was delayed due to structural defects at the West Wales General Hospital. The required major reconstruction work continued until 1995.

On 25 February 1996, all patients were transferred from Priory Street Hospital to the West Wales General Hospital. Priory Street Hospital was formally closed on 31 March 1996.

The site was sold to developers in October 1998 for £50,000. This resulted in a loss to the NHS of £120,000 due to security and other costs.

== Development and current status ==
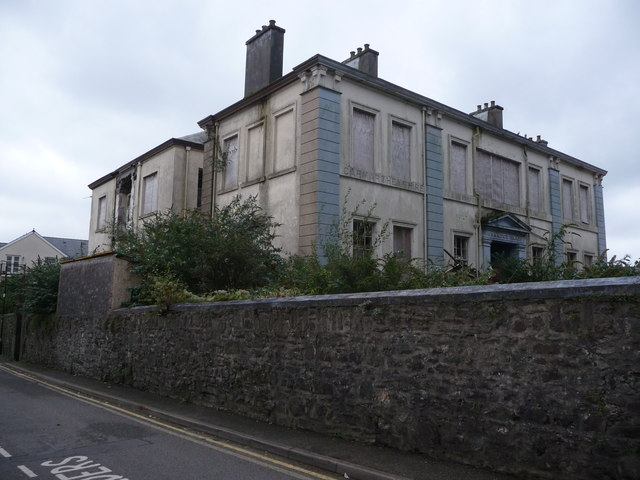
The derelict buildings of Carmarthen Infirmary in 2011

Carmarthen Infirmary was located on Priory Street, Carmarthen. It was built in 1857–1858 by architect William Wesley Jenkins, London, for the cost of £3,260. The foundation stone was laid by Bishop Connop Thirwall on 14 May 1857. The building is in the Italianate style and bears the inscriptions "Carmarthenshire Infirmary Supported by Voluntary Contributions", "Founded 1847" and "Built 1858". The building was Grade II listed in 1981. The gatepiers at the entrance to the infirmary are also listed, along with the World War I memorial in front of the building.

Extensions were added to the rear from 1899 to 1934. These were demolished in 2002.

The building was left vacant after the hospital's closure and had fallen into a state of disrepair by 2007, when heritage campaigners attempted to recruit a buyer to restore it. In 2013, it was derelict when plans to convert it into 19 flats were approved.

In 2017, the building was converted into apartments for those over 50. The site is now known as Plas y Milwr.

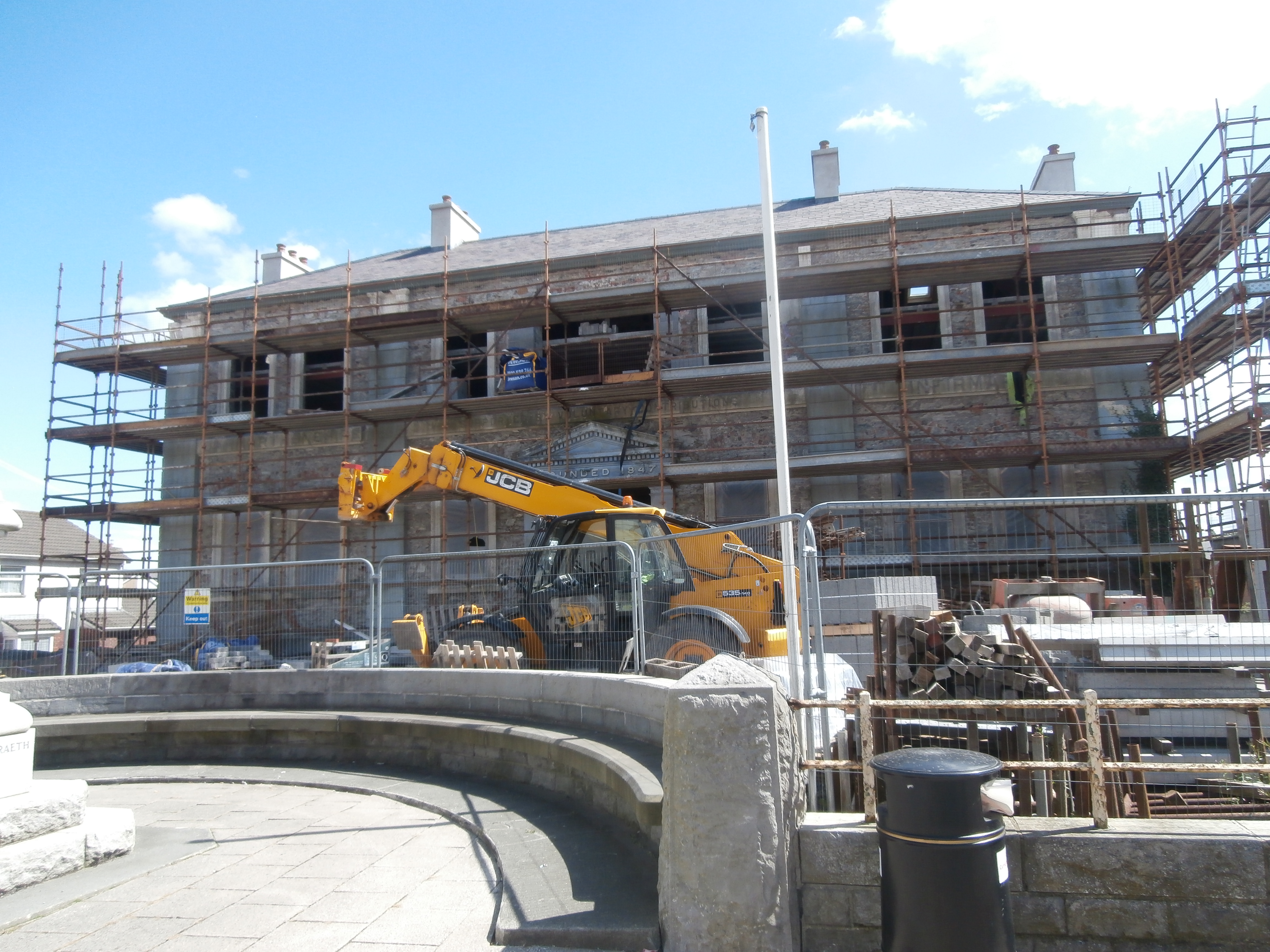
Site of the old Carmarthen Infirmary during renovation into apartments in 2016

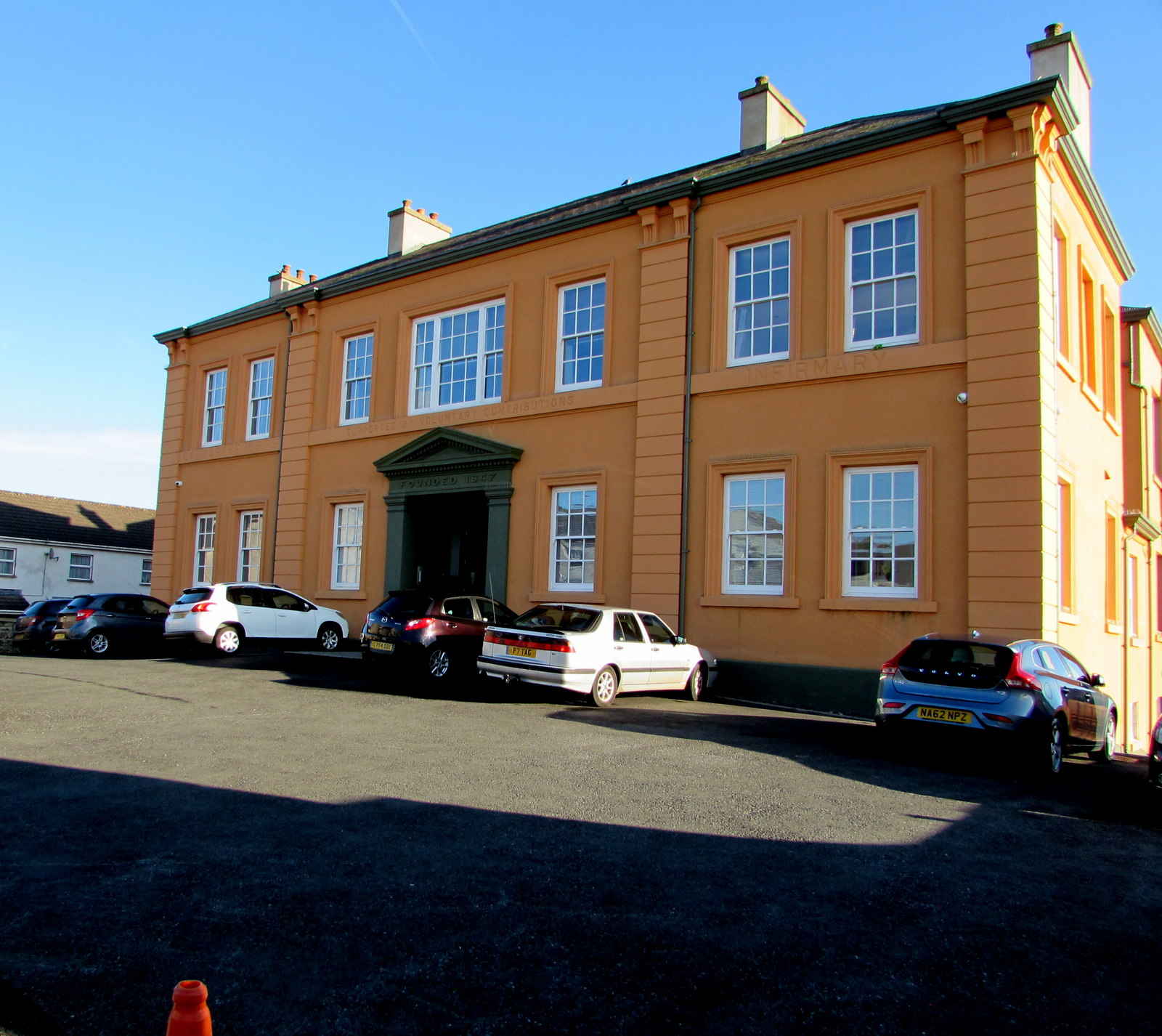
Site of Carmarthen Infirmary after renovation into apartments in 2019
