= Cwmfelin Mynach =

Village in Carmarthenshire, Wales

Coordinates: 51°54′N 4°35′W

Cwmfelin Mynach is a village in Carmarthenshire, Wales. It has a population of only 64 residents. Cwmfelin Mynach means Valley (cwm) of the Monks' (Mynach) Mill (Felin). It was founded in the 6th century by the Cistercian monks, or Whitefriars, who had a monastery in nearby Whitland.

The river Gronw which starts at Blaenwaun (one of the highest inhabited villages in the West Wales peninsula) runs through Cwmfelin Mynach. In the medieval period the river was used to drive a corn mill. The river was also used for Baptisms.

== Facilities ==
The village has no public house or post office. A Welsh-speaking chapel has regular services in the village, Llanwinio community Council have held meetings in the Chapel flat.

Some of the cottages in the village date back to the 19th century. They are built with the same form of slate that is reminiscent of the underlying geology, a blue 'Llandovery slate. The stone for cottage building came from three, now dis-used, quarries in the village.

The village has had underground fibre-optic cables laid. There is no mains gas in the village or sewage treatment; every home uses septic tanks. The water is pumped to the village from the reservoir underneath the Preseli Mountains.

== Flora and fauna ==
Local fauna include red kites, buzzards, tawny owls and sparrowhawks. Wood pigeons, rock doves, herons and jackdaws are common. Grey wagtail can be seen fishing by the river.

The caraway is the county flower of Carmarthenshire and is similar in appearance to the lady's smock, or cuckoo flower. The dominant trees are beech and ash, and sycamore and oaks to a lesser degree.
