= David Charles (hymn-writer) =

British hymn writer (1762–1834)

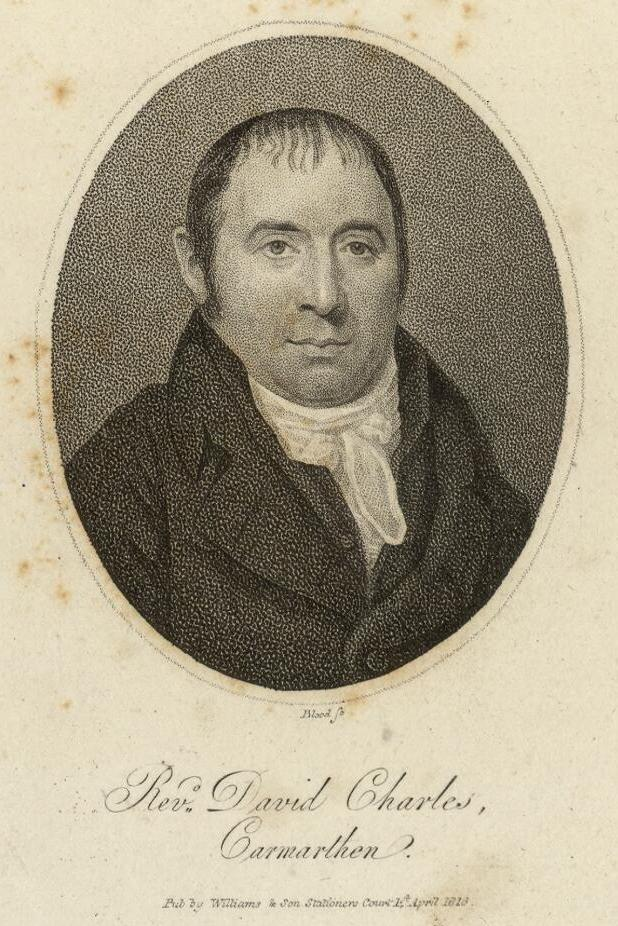
David Charles

David Charles (11 October 1762 – 2 September 1834) was a Welsh hymn-writer.

== Life ==
David Charles was born at Llanfihangel Abercywyn, near St Clears in Carmarthenshire, the son of Rees and Jael Charles, and the younger brother of the Methodist leader Thomas Charles, later of Bala.

He was apprenticed to a flax-dresser and rope-maker at Carmarthen and afterwards spent three years at Bristol. He returned to Carmarthen when he married Sarah, the daughter of Samuel Levi Phillips, a Haverfordwest banker, and set himself up as a tradesman. Long connected with the Calvinistic Methodists, he joined the congregation at Water Street Chapel and became an elder. Charles began to preach at the age of forty-six, and was one of the first lay-preachers ordained ministers in South Wales in 1811.

He helped to establish the "Home Mission", but was forced to retire in 1828 after suffering a stroke. He died on 2 September 1834, and was buried at Llangunnor. There is a memorial to Charles, by Daniel Mainwaring, at Water Street Chapel.

His best-known hymns include "O fryniau Caersalem ceir gweled" ("From the Hills of Jerusalem are Seen").

== Sources ==
=== Books and Journals ===
- E. Wyn James, ‘David Charles (1762–1834), Caerfyrddin: Diwinydd, Pregethwr, Emynydd’, Cylchgrawn Hanes (Cymdeithas Hanes y Methodistiaid Calfinaidd)/Journal of the Historical Society of the Presbyterian Church of Wales, 36 (2012), 13–56. ISSN 0141-5255.

=== Online ===
- Roberts, Gomer M. (1959). "David Charles, Calvinistic Methodist minister, and hymn-writer.". Dictionary of Welsh Biography. National Library of Wales.
