= Peter Williams (Welsh Methodist) =

Welsh biblical commentator (1723–1796)

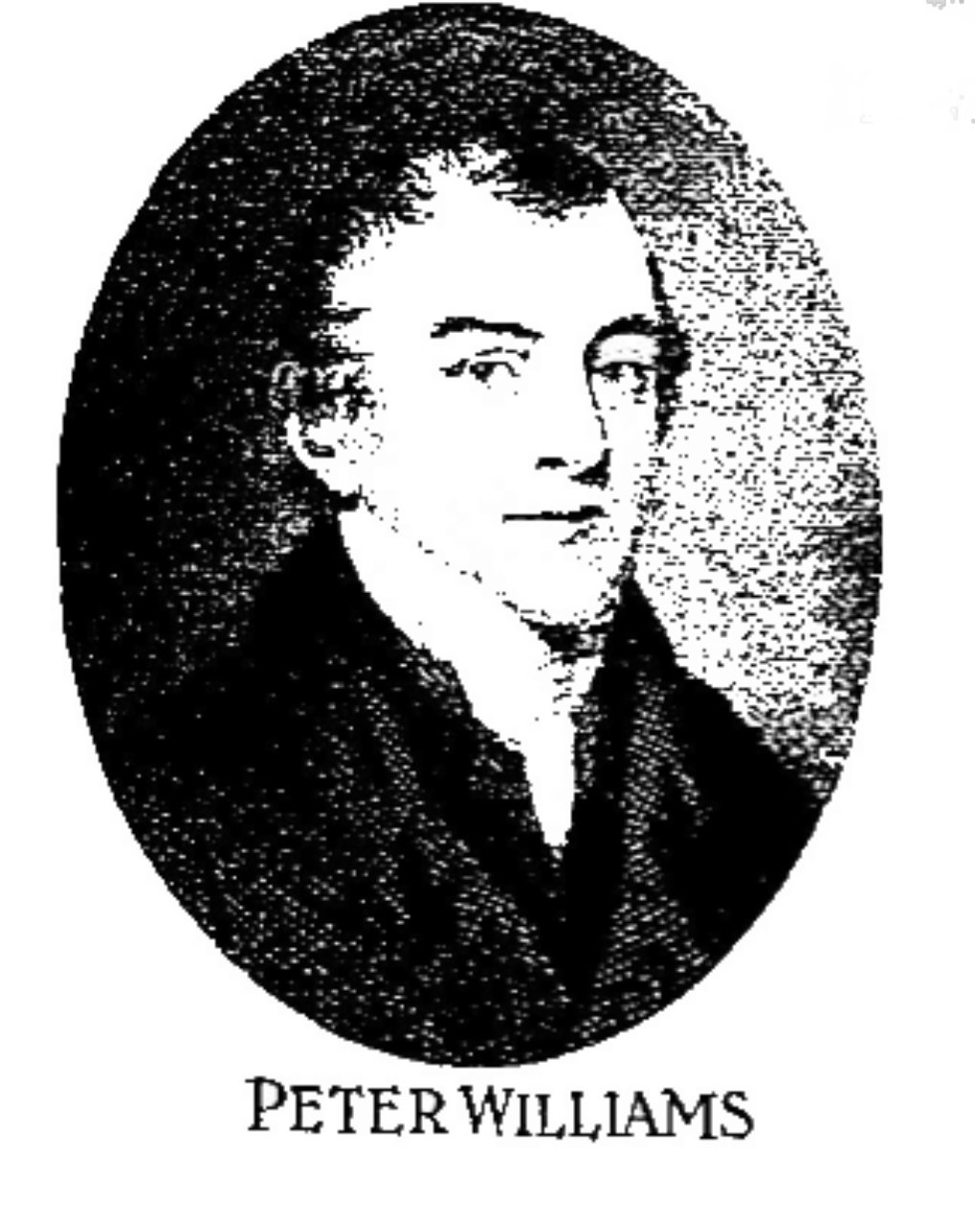
- Born: 15 January 1723
- Died: 8 August 1796 (aged 73)
- Spouse: Mary Jenkins
- Children: Eliezer Williams (1754-1820), Peter Bailey Williams (1763-1836)

Peter Williams (15 January 1723 – 8 August 1796) was a prominent leader of Welsh Calvinistic Methodism in the eighteenth century, best known for publishing Welsh-language bibles and bible commentary.

== Personal life ==
Williams was born on 15 January 1723 at West Marsh Farm in Laugharne in Carmarthenshire, the son of Owen and Elizabeth Williams. In 1748, he married Mary Jenkins and settled at Llandyfaelog in Carmarthenshire.

== Career ==
While a student at Carmarthen Grammar School in 1743, Williams was converted after hearing a sermon by George Whitefield. For a short time, he was a schoolmaster at Cynwyl Elfed. He was ordained a deacon in 1745 and briefly held curacies in the diocese of St Davids, at Eglwys Gymyn, Swansea, and at Llangrannog and Llandysilio Gogo in Ceredigion. He was dismissed from his curacies and refused ordination as a priest due to his Methodist sympathies and became associated with Water Street Chapel Carmarthen.

Williams joined the Methodists in 1747 and began to tour the country preaching. He became one of the outstanding leaders of the first generation of Welsh Calvinistic Methodists, together with Howell Harris, Daniel Rowlands, the hymn writer William Williams Pantycelyn and Howel Davies, the 'Apostle of Pembrokeshire'.

In 1770 Williams began to publish copies of Welsh language bibles at an affordable price, with commentaries on each chapter. The commentaries assisted in avoiding the claim to a monopoly over the right to publish the Welsh Bible which was asserted by the Royal Printer and the Universities of Oxford and Cambridge. The first edition of Williams' Bible was printed by John Ross and published in Carmarthen in 1770. It was the first ever publication in Wales of the Welsh Bible. It sold out in the same year. There was a demand for many more editions. In due course Williams produced thousands of copies of Welsh language bibles and Beibl Peter Williams remained popular in Wales throughout the nineteenth century.

In 1773 Williams published a biblical concordance in the Welsh language (the Mynegeir Ysgrythurol) which greatly assisted study of the Welsh Bible.

Williams was also a writer and a poet. He edited a volume of Welsh hymns in 1759 and published Hymns on Various Subjects in 1771. In 1771 he was the first translator into English of the popular hymn 'Guide me, O Thou Great Jehovah' from the original Welsh of Williams Pantycelyn: the first verse of Peter Williams' English translation is still sung today.

Williams' commentary on John i.1 led to suggestions that he sympathized with Sabellianism. The controversy sharpened in 1790 when Williams published a Welsh language bible with a Welsh translation of the biblical annotations first published in 1647 by the English Puritan minister John Canne. In 1791, the matter came to a head at a Methodist 'Sasiwn' (Association meeting) at Llandeilo and Williams was expelled.

== Death ==
His last years were spent in conflict with the Methodists. At this time Williams denied them use of the chapel in Water Street. Williams died at Llandyfaelog on 8 August 1796 and is buried in Llandyfaelog churchyard.

== Careers of his sons ==
During Peter Williams' own life, the Welsh Calvinistic Methodists remained within the Established Church. They did not break formally with the Established Church until 1811.

Two of Peter Williams' sons became clergymen in the Established Church : Eliezer Williams (1754–1820) and Peter Bailey Williams (1763–1836). Both were educated at Carmarthen grammar school and Jesus College, Oxford.

Eliezer Williams was Vicar of Lampeter (1805 to 1820). He founded and supervised for 14 years Lampeter grammar school, which prepared young men for ordination in the Established Church. He was also known as a genealogist and antiquary.

Peter Bailey Williams was Rector of Llanberis and Llanrug (1792–1836). In 1793 he founded in Llanrug one of the first Sunday schools in Caernarvonshire. In 1798 he led the first recorded rock climb in Britain. His son, Henry Bailey Williams (1805–1879) followed his father as rector of Llanberis (1836–43) and of Llanrug (1843–79).

== Sources ==
- Roberts, Gomer M. "Peter Williams, Methodist cleric, author, and Biblical commentator". Dictionary of Welsh Biography.
