= John Daniel (printer) =

Welsh printer (c. 1755 – 1823)

- Born: c. 1755; Carmarthenshire
- Died: 10 January 1823 (aged 67–68)
- Resting place: Llangunnor
- Occupation: Printer, bookseller, bookbinder, librarian

John Daniel (c. 1755 – 10 January 1823) was a Welsh printer in Carmarthen.

== Early life ==
Daniel was from the south Carmarthenshire area, the only son of his father, who was a farmer.

== Career ==
He apprenticed with John Ross of Carmarthen, then moved to London to work for the King's printers.

He returned to Carmarthen in 1784 and, in December, set up a very successful printing business, working with John Ross on the production of some books in the early 1790s. The business operated initially in King Street before moving to Lower Market Street (now known as Hall Street) in 1792.

In 1792, Daniel published an anti-slavery pamphlet written by Morgan John Rhys encouraging readers to boycott sugar, as well as a 12-verse poem called Achwynion Dynion Duon, mewn Caethiwed Truenus yn Ynysoedd y Suwgr (English: The Complaints of Black Men, in Wretched Captivity in the Sugar Islands), which was likely the first anti-slavery publication in Welsh.

He was the first printer in Wales to print music in staff notation when he produced Cyfaill mewn Llogell by John Williams (c. 1750 – 1807) in 1797.

In March 1810, he began printing The Carmarthen Journal.

John Daniel was described as a quick compositor and skilled typographer.

== Personal life ==
Daniel married Ann in London prior to 1784. They had a daughter.

He was made a freeman of the borough of Carmarthen in 1800.

== Death ==
John Daniel died on 10 January 1823 and is buried, along with his wife, Ann, in Llangunnor churchyard.
