= English Baptist Church, Carmarthen =

Church in Carmarthenshire, Wales

Coordinates: 51.8568°N 4.3092°W

English Baptist Church
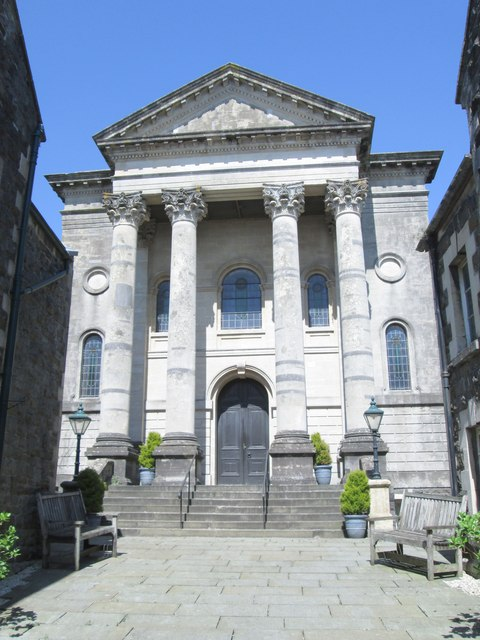
- English Baptist Church
- Location: 9 Dark Gate, Carmarthen
- Country: Wales
- Denomination: Baptist chapel

Architecture
- Heritage designation: Grade II*
- Designated: 19 May 1981
- Architectural type: Chapel
- Style: Neoclassical

The English Baptist Church is a Baptist church in the town of Carmarthen, Carmarthenshire, Wales. The building dates from 1869 and is located at the street address 9 Dark Gate in Lammas Street. The church was designated a Grade II* listed building on 19 May 1981.

The church is set back from the road in a courtyard where the Black Horse Inn had previously stood. It was built between 1869 and 1870 by the Carmarthen architect George Morgan, his first major undertaking. Records show that the church cost £1,400 to build. The façade is built in temple-style from Bath stone, with four tall columns supporting the portico. There is a flight of wide stone steps leading to the entrance. The interior has a single raked gallery, behind which is an arch with painted foliage and fluted decoration. The edge of the gallery is bounded by a cast iron band and is supported by cast iron columns. The lower parts of the walls are panelled and the original furnishings are still in place; the great seat has a simple balustrade. The organ has a purpose-built gallery but was not installed until 1887.

The church was designated a Grade II* listed building on 19 May 1981, as "one of the most architecturally-ambitious classical chapels in Wales". The Royal Commission on the Ancient and Historical Monuments of Wales curates the archaeological, architectural and historic records for this church. These include digital photographs and colour transparencies of the exterior and interior of the building, and a leaflet containing a short history of the church.

== Community canteen ==
In 2022 the church started a community kitchen and canteen, Cegin Hedyn, in the former Cellar Cafe of the church. It was run on a 'pay what you can' basis. In the first year they served more than 3,000 meals.
