= Capel Heol Dŵr, Carmarthen =

Church in Carmarthenshire, Wales

Coordinates: 51.8571°N 4.3116°W

Capel Heol Dŵr
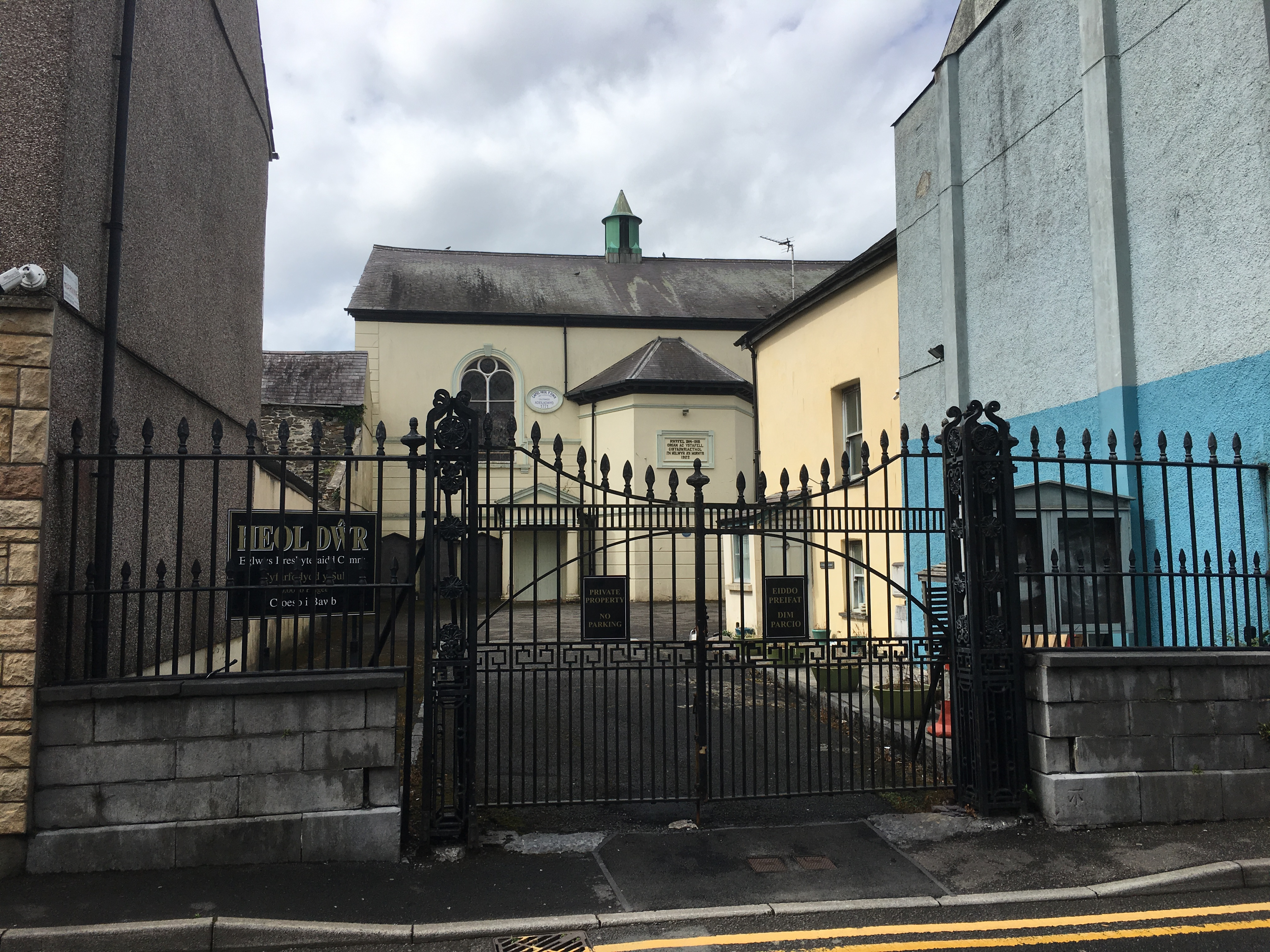
- Capel Heol Dŵr
- Location: Water Street, Carmarthen
- Country: Wales
- Denomination: Calvinistic Methodist chapel

Architecture
- Heritage designation: Grade II
- Designated: 19 May 1981
- Architectural type: Chapel
- Style: Early 19th century
- Closed: 2016

Capel Heol Dŵr was a Calvinistic Methodist chapel in the town of Carmarthen, Carmarthenshire, Wales. The building dates from 1831 and is located at Water St, Carmarthen. It was designated as a Grade II listed building on 19 May 1981.

== Origins ==
Calvinistic Methodists were active in Carmarthen from around 1740, and a group met at a house in Goose Street (later known as St Catherine Street). The key figure in the establishment of the cause at Water Street was Peter Williams, a native of the area who had been converted to Methodism in 1743 under the influence of George Whitfield. Williams served as a curate in several parishes but was refused ordination because of his Methodist sympathies. The first chapel was built in the garden of a house that he leased in Water Street.

David Charles (1762–1834), brother of Thomas Charles of Bala was associated with the chapel, and was one of the 11 ministers ordained in 1811 against the wishes of the Anglican church, thus bringing the Calvinistic Methodist denomination in Wales into being.

== Description ==
Capel Heol Dŵr was therefore an early Methodist chapel, and the present building dates from 1831. The long-wall frontage has a pair of pedimented porches on Tuscan columns, each having a large arched window above. The interior has a five-sided gallery. The box pews are neatly fitted, radiating to match the gallery. There is a most unusual pulpit; this is shaped like a wine-glass with a curved flight of steps. A similar pulpit is to be found in the nearby Capel Heol Awst, Carmarthen which was built in 1826, but these pulpits are rare elsewhere having disappeared when alterations and enlargements were made to chapels. The ceilings are boarded and ribbed and have a large plaster rose. There is fine stained glass and several noteworthy monuments. The chapel was refurbished in 1891 and again in 1922, when additions included a new stucco front, a new ceiling and a new organ bay at the middle of the front facade.

The chapel was designated as a Grade II listed building on 19 May 1981, being an example of a fine "earlier C19 chapel with surviving interior fittings including gallery of 1831". The Royal Commission on the Ancient and Historical Monuments of Wales curates the archaeological, architectural and historic records for this church. These include digital photographs and colour transparencies of the exterior and interior of the building, from the Rosser Collection and the Robert Scourfield Collection.

== Later history ==
Three churches were established in later years as branches of Heol Dwr, namely Babell, Pensarn (1849); Zion, Carmarthen (1850) and Bethania, Carmarthen (1902).

The Rev. J. Lewis was inducted as minister in 1871, with the congregation of 2000 people said to be present.

In 1903, the Rev M.H. Jones of Abercynon was inducted as minister. He remained for three years.

In 2016 it was announced that the chapel would close due to rising costs and a decreasing membership. Broadcaster Huw Edwards supported a campaign to maintain the building. Like Heol Dwr, the causes at Zion and Bethania came to an end in 2014/15.

== Sources ==
- Lodwick, Joyce and Victor (1994). The Story of Carmarthen (third (updated) ed.). Carmarthen: St Peter's Press. ISBN 0-9517962-0-8.
