= Capel Heol Awst, Carmarthen =

Church in Carmarthenshire, Wales

Coordinates: 51.8561°N 4.3115°W

Capel Heol Awst
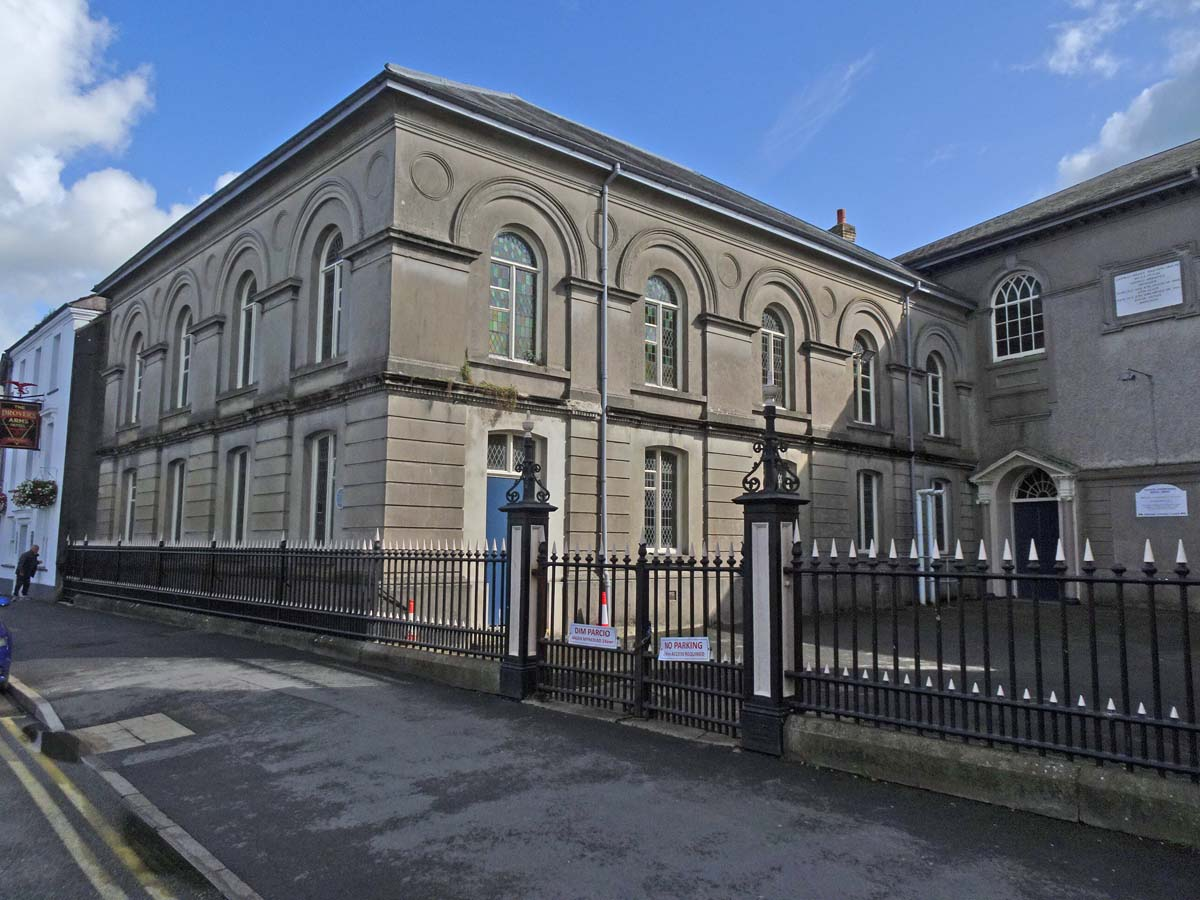
- Capel Heol Awst
- Location: Lammas Street, Carmarthen
- Country: Wales
- Denomination: Independent chapel

Architecture
- Heritage designation: Grade II*
- Designated: 19 May 1981
- Architectural type: Chapel
- Style: Early 19th century

Capel Heol Awst is an Independent Welsh chapel in the town of Carmarthen, Carmarthenshire, Wales. The present building dates from 1826 to 1827, replacing a 1726 building which itself had been enlarged in 1802 and again in 1826 to seat a congregation of 1000. It is located on Lammas Street (Heol Awst), Carmarthen. It was designated as a Grade II* listed building on 19 May 1981.

== Early history ==
The cause dates from 1726 but its origins are earlier and connected to the Puritan, Stephen Hughes (1622–88), known as the "Apostle of Carmarthenshire", who is said to have established a meeting house for Congregationalists in Lammas Street. After his death, William Evans of Pencader took over as the leading figure and he was followed by Thomas Perrott of Llanybri after this death in 1718. It was Perrott who instigated the building a meeting house where the chapel was later built. Around this time, a Presbyterian Academy was established in Carmarthen, and until 1840 the minister at Lammas Street was also senior tutor, or principal of the academy.

David Peter, minister at Lammas Street from 1792 until his retirement in 1835, presided over the rebuilding of the chapel in 1802. By 1826 the building was considered too small so was rebuilt and enlarged again, resulting in the emergence of a structure recognisable as the present building.

== Description ==
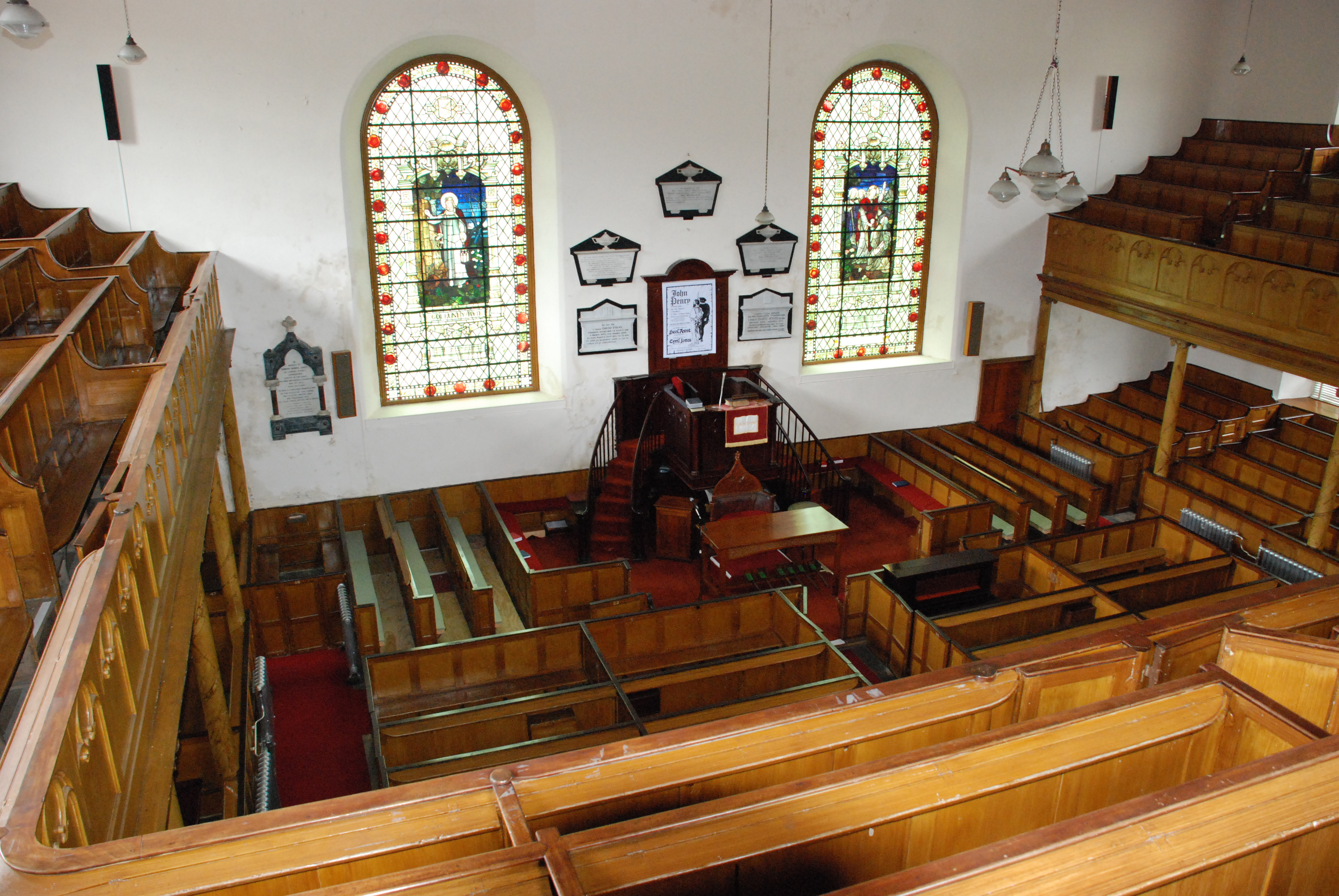
Interior

The chapel was built in 1826 and 1827 by William Owen of Haverfordwest and is considered the finest chapel of its kind in the area. The exterior is plain with a big, hipped roof. There are two arched windows above two Iconic doorways. The interior is spacious, broad and well-fitted, with a single deep gallery. The box pews are neatly fitted and there is a most unusual pulpit; this is shaped like a wine-glass with a curved flight of steps. A similar pulpit is to be found in the nearby Capel Heol Dŵr, which was built in 1831, but they are rare elsewhere having disappeared when alterations and enlargements were made to chapels. Tabernacle Chapel, Llandovery, built in 1836, has a similar broad interior but differs in having large Gothic windows and a gabled roof.

Capel Heol Awst was designated as a Grade II*-listed building on 19 May 1981, being an example of one of the outstanding early 19th century chapels in Wales, with "strong external architectural character and a good interior". The Royal Commission on the Ancient and Historical Monuments of Wales curates the archaeological, architectural and historic records for this church. These include digital photographs and colour transparencies of the exterior and interior of the building.

== Recent history ==
In 1948, the Rev. Emrys Jones, minister of Tabernacle, Cwmgors, and described as one of the rising stats of the denomination, received a unanimous invitation to become pastor of Heol Awst.

== Sources ==
- Lodwick, Joyce and Victor (1994). The Story of Carmarthen (third (updated) ed.). Carmarthen: St Peter's Press. ISBN 0-9517962-0-8.
