= Blaenwaun =

Village in Carmarthenshire, Wales

Coordinates: 51°54′54″N 4°33′55″W

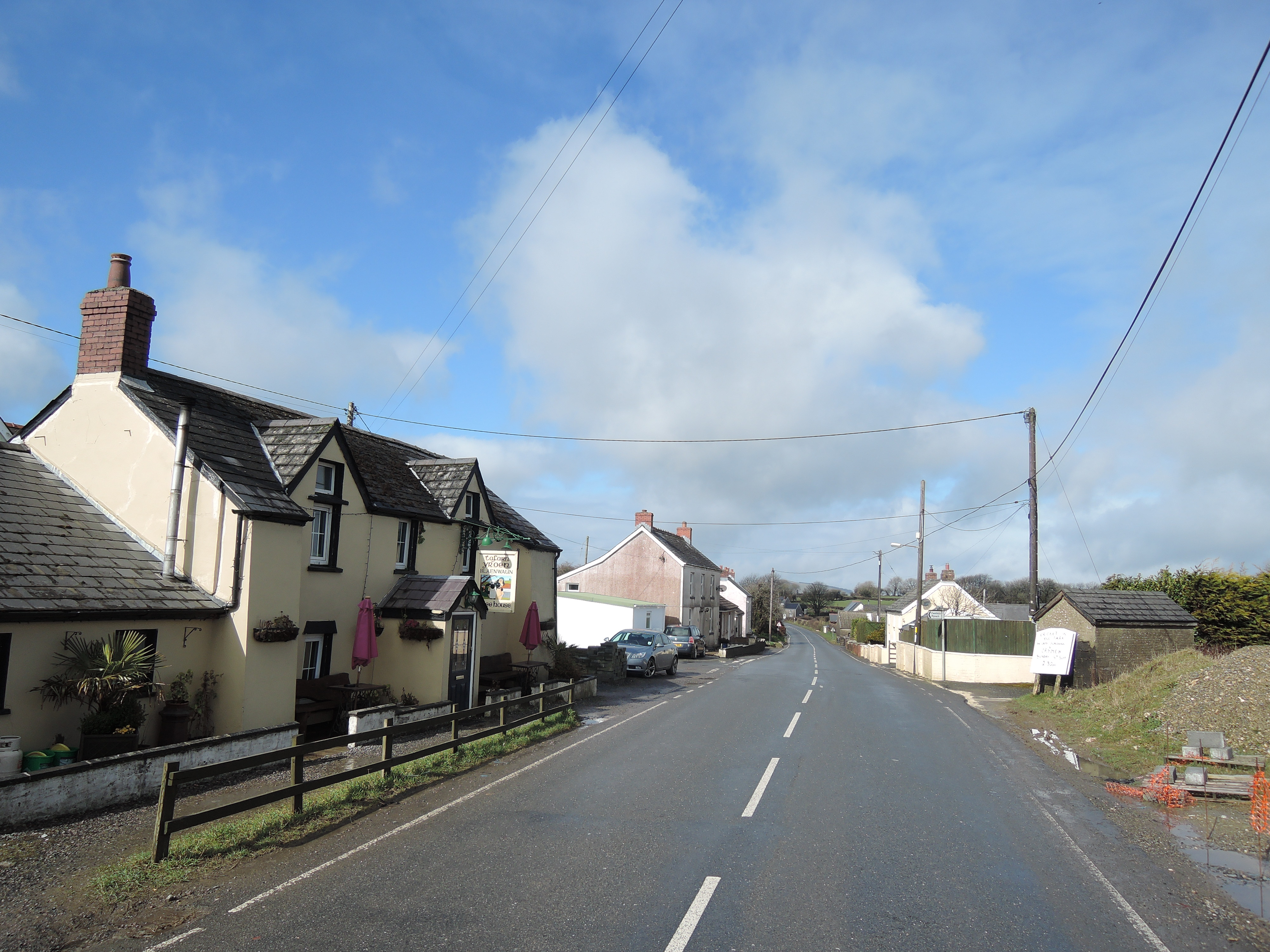
Looking north in Blaenwaun along the main road with Tafarn Yr Oen on the left hand side

Blaenwaun (standardised spelling: Blaen-waun) is a small village in Carmarthenshire, Wales, 11 km (7 mi) north of Whitland. It is one of the five villages of Llanwinio parish, in the Diocese of St Davids. It lies 220 m (720 ft) above sea level, making it one of the highest villages in the West Wales peninsula.

The village features a pub named Tafarn Yr Oen (The Lamb Inn). There is a phone box and a children's play area owned by Llanwinio Community Council. Moreia Welsh Independent Chapel was built in 1828 and remodelled in 1885.

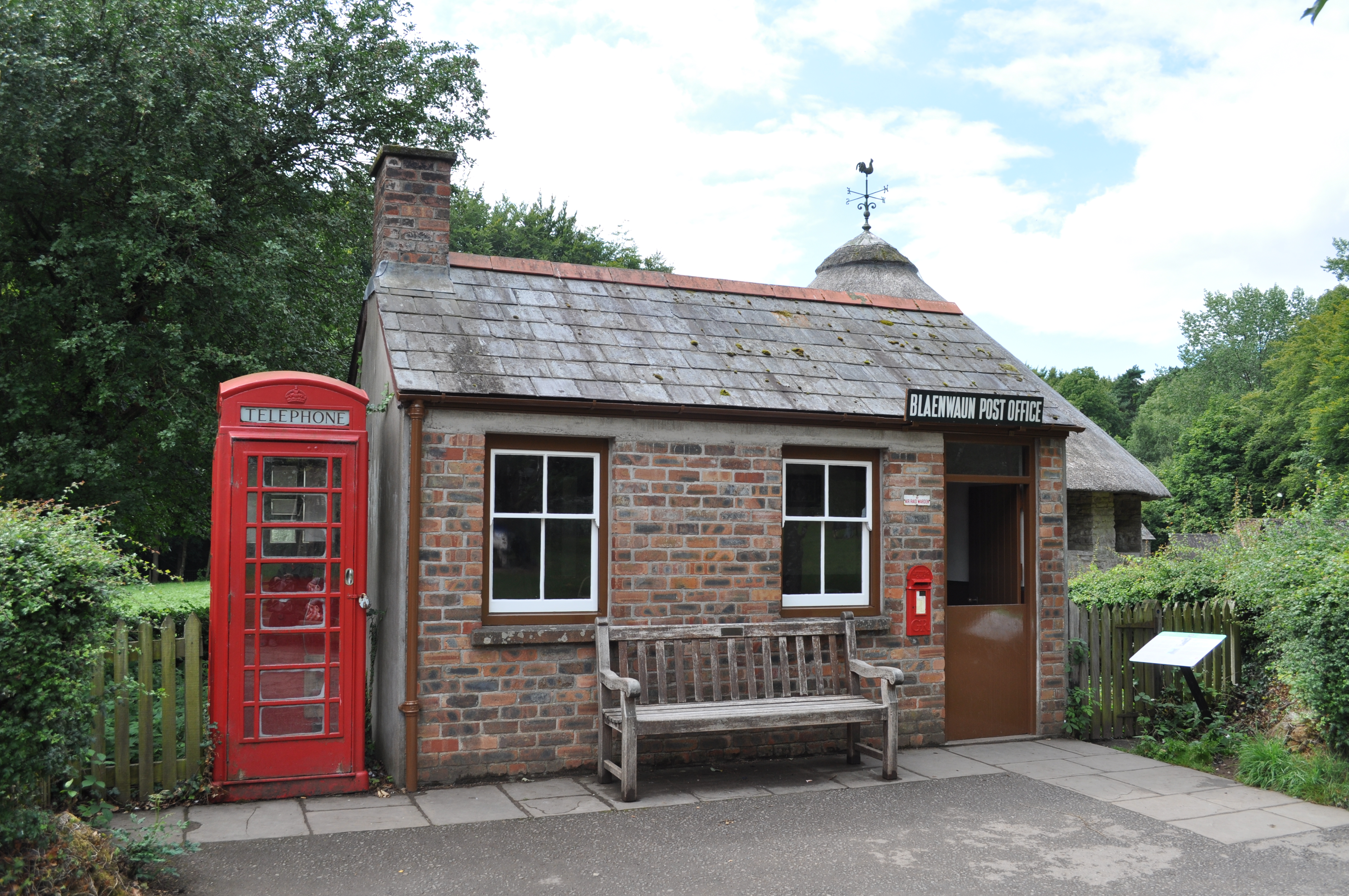
Blaenwaun post office, relocated to St Fagans National Museum of History, Cardiff

It was previously home to the smallest post office in Wales, a 5 by 2.9 m (16 by 10 ft) brick structure built in 1936 which was moved to St Fagans National Museum of History, near Cardiff, in 1992. As of 2022, a mobile post office visits the village twice a week.

Dyffryn Brodyn, a 5.5 MW 11-turbine wind farm built in 1994, is adjacent to the village.
