= Morgan John Rhys =

Welsh radical evangelical Baptist minister

Morgan John Rhys, also Rhees (8 December 1760 – 7 December 1804) was a Welsh radical evangelical Baptist minister. He preached the principles of the French Revolution, against slavery, and in favour of the reform of parliament.

== Life ==
Morgan John Rhys was a Welsh radical evangelical Baptist minister. He preached the principles of the French Revolution, against slavery, and in favor of the reform of parliament. He founded the magazine Cylchgrawn Cymraeg to share these ideas.

In 1794 he grew tired of the repression in Britain and emigrated to America where he established a Welsh colony, Cambria. He bought land in the Allegheny Mountains of Pennsylvania from Dr. Benjamin Rush and founded the town of Beula, which to his dismay, never became a fully realized endeavor and died promptly within a decade of its founding (1796–1804). Despite the town's short lifespan, while it was in full bloom in the early years, Rhys established his own religious denomination and a newspaper, The Western Sky. After emigrating to America he changed his surname to Rhees. He vied desperately to the state and even federal government that there be a county in Pennsylvania called Cambria, and that his town of Beula ought to be the county seat. When in 1804 the Pennsylvania state government carved out Cambria County, Beula lost the vote to become its seat by one, instead, the nearby town of Ebensburg – originally part of Beula – became the county seat. Rhys died two weeks after the verdict was released.

He moved to Somerset County in 1799 and died there in 1804.

== Descendants ==
Morgan Rhees' second son, via his wife Anne Loxley (a daughter of Benjamin Loxley), Benjamin Rush Rhees (1798 –1831) was named after Morgan's friend and benefactor Benjamin Rush. He would become a prominent physician and one of the founders and first faculty members of Jefferson Medical College.

He was also the great-grandfather of (Benjamin) Rush Rhees (1860–1939), the third president of the University of Rochester and, in turn, great-great-grandfather of Wittgensteinian philosopher Rush Rhees. Morgan Rhees was also the great-grandfather of Nicholas Murray Butler, President of Columbia University.
