= 1922 Carmarthen Rural District Council election =

Election held in Wales in April 1922

An election to the Carmarthen Rural District Council in Wales was held in April 1922. It was preceded by the 1919 election, and was followed by the 1925 election. Ten members were returned unopposed. The successful candidates were also elected to the Carmarthen Board of Guardians.

== Overview of the results ==
The election was fought on non-political lines, in contrast to the county election the previous month.

== Ward results ==
=== Abergwili (two seats) ===
Abergwili 1922
Party	Candidate	Votes	%	±%
Independent	David Davies	167		
Independent	Thomas Duncan Dempster	154		
Independent	Evan Griffiths	141		
Independent	T. Alfred Jarman	105		
Independent	John George Davies	90		
Independent	Richard Davies	78		
Independent	Evan Evans	75		
Independent	Daniel Davies	65		
Independent	David Davies	38		
Independent hold		Swing		
Independent hold		Swing		

=== Abernant (one seat) ===
Abernant 1922
Party	Candidate	Votes	%	±%
Independent	David Jones*	108		
Independent	Thomas Phillips	41		
Independent hold		Swing		

=== Conwil (two seats) ===
Conwil 1922
Party	Candidate	Votes	%	±%
Independent	John Jones Evans*	250		
Independent	David Jones	215		
Independent	John Davies	162		
Independent hold		Swing		
Independent hold		Swing		

=== Laugharne Parish (one seat) ===
Laugharne Parish 1922
Party	Candidate	Votes	%	±%
Independent	Thomas Jenkins*	Unopposed		
Independent hold		Swing		

=== Laugharne Township (one seat) ===
Laugharne Township 1922
Party	Candidate	Votes	%	±%
Independent	Benjamin Edwards	213		
Independent	J. Lloyd	142		
Independent hold		Swing		

=== Llanarthney (two seats) ===
Llanarthney 1922
Party	Candidate	Votes	%	±%
Independent	William Brazell*	634		
Labour	Thomas Thomas	519		
Independent	David Evans	413		
Labour	John Thomas	231		
Independent hold		Swing		
Labour gain from Independent		Swing		

=== Llandawke and Llansadurnen (one seat) ===
Llandawke and Llansadurnen 1922
Party	Candidate	Votes	%	±%
Independent	William Richard Rees*	36		
Independent	George Alfred Lewis	23		
Independent hold		Swing		

=== Llanddarog (one seat) ===
Llanddarog 1922
Party	Candidate	Votes	%	±%
Independent	James William Lewis*	Unopposed		
Independent hold		Swing		

=== Llandeilo Abercowyn and Llangynog (one seat) ===
Llandeilo Abercowyn and Llangynog 1922
Party	Candidate	Votes	%	±%
Independent	John Griffiths*	Unopposed		
Independent hold		Swing		

=== Llanddowror (one seat) ===
Llanddowror 1919
Party	Candidate	Votes	%	±%
Independent	Benjamin Thomas*	36		
Independent	T.H. David	33		
Independent hold		Swing		

=== Llandyfaelog (one seat) ===
Llandyfaelog 1919
Party	Candidate	Votes	%	±%
Independent	William Bowen	220		
Independent	Edgar Stephens	112		
Independent hold		Swing		

=== Llanfihangel Abercowin (one seat) ===
Llanfihangel Abercowin 1922
Party	Candidate	Votes	%	±%
Independent	John Evans	Unopposed		
Independent hold		Swing		

=== Llangain (one seat) ===
Llangain 1919
Party	Candidate	Votes	%	±%
Independent	Rev Evan Jones	Unopposed		
Independent hold		Swing		

=== Llangendeirne (two seats) ===
Llangendeirne 1922
Party	Candidate	Votes	%	±%
Labour	Richard Williams*	450		
Independent	Rees Thomas	311		
Independent	David Rees	132		
Labour hold		Swing		
Independent hold		Swing		

=== Llangunnor (one seat) ===
Llangunnor 1922
Party	Candidate	Votes	%	±%
Independent	Thomas Roberts*	182		
Independent	John Moses	169		
Independent hold		Swing		

=== Llangynin (one seat) ===
Llangynin 1922
Party	Candidate	Votes	%	±%
Independent	John Thomas Williams*	55		
Independent	John Lewis Davies	53		
Independent hold		Swing		

=== Llanllawddog (one seat) ===
Llanllawddog 1919
Party	Candidate	Votes	%	±%
Independent	Evan Jones	103		
Independent	John Jones	67		
Independent hold		Swing		

=== Llanpumsaint (one seat) ===
Llanpumsaint 1922
Party	Candidate	Votes	%	±%
Independent	John James	Unopposed		
Independent hold		Swing		

=== Llanstephan (one seat) ===
Llanstephan 1922
Party	Candidate	Votes	%	±%
Independent	John Llewelyn Richards*	Unopposed		
Independent hold		Swing		

=== Llanwinio (one seat) ===
Llanwinio 1919
Party	Candidate	Votes	%	±%
Independent	William Williams	127		
Independent	George R. Thomas	72		
Independent hold		Swing		

=== Merthyr (one seat) ===
Merthyr 1922
Party	Candidate	Votes	%	±%
Independent	William James Davies*	Unopposed		
Independent hold		Swing		

=== Mydrim (one seat) ===
Mydrim 1922
Party	Candidate	Votes	%	±%
Independent	William Calvin Lewis*	Unopposed		
Independent hold		Swing		

=== Newchurch (one seat) ===
Newchurch 1922
Party	Candidate	Votes	%	±%
Independent	David Davies	Unopposed		
Independent hold		Swing		

=== St Clears (one seat) ===
St Clears 1919
Party	Candidate	Votes	%	±%
Independent	Benjamin Salmon*	Unopposed		
Independent hold		Swing		

=== St Ishmaels (one seat) ===
St Ishmaels 1922
Party	Candidate	Votes	%	±%
Independent	John Beynon*	299		
Independent	Rev Henry R. Charles	183		
Independent hold		Swing		

=== Trelech a'r Betws (two seats) ===
Trelech a'r Betws 1922
Party	Candidate	Votes	%	±%
Independent	Simon Owen Thomas	Unopposed		
Independent	Richard Emmett Rees*	Unopposed		
Independent	Davey George Bowen	96		
Independent hold		Swing		
Independent hold		Swing		

== Carmarthen Board of Guardians ==
All members of the District Council also served as members of Carmarthen Board of Guardians. In addition six members were elected to represent the borough of Carmarthen. All six sitting members were returned unopposed.

=== Carmarthen (six seats) ===
Carmarthen 1922
Party	Candidate	Votes	%	±%
Independent	Miss S.A. Evans*	Unopposed		
Independent	Andrew Fuller-Mills*	Unopposed		
Independent	David Hinds*	Unopposed		
Independent	John Dyfnallt Owen*	Unopposed		
Independent	Georgina M.E. White*	Unopposed		
Independent	Thomas Williams	Unopposed		
Independent hold				
Independent hold				
Independent hold				
Independent hold				
Independent hold				
Independent hold				
