= 1928 Carmarthen Rural District Council election =

Local election in Wales

An election to the Carmarthen Rural District Council in Wales was held in April 1928. It was preceded by the 1925 election and was followed by the 1931 election. A large number of candidates had been returned unopposed. The successful candidates were also elected to the Carmarthen Board of Guardians.

== Boundary changes ==
There were no boundary changes but an additional seat had been created at St Ishmaels. In addition, the number of guardians representing the Carmarthen town were increased from six to eight and the four county council wards were adopted in place of electing six members for the whole town.

== Overview of the results ==
23 Independent candidates (well over half the membership of the council) were returned unopposed and only two of wards were contested by Labour candidates, one of whom was returned unopposed at Llanarthne.

== Ward results ==
=== Abergwili (two seats) ===
Abergwili 1928
Party	Candidate	Votes	%	±%
Independent	Thomas Duncan Dempster*	429		
Independent	Evan Griffiths*	361		
Independent	Evan Morgan	89		
Independent hold		Swing		
Independent hold		Swing		

=== Abernant (one seat) ===
Abernant 1928
Party	Candidate	Votes	%	±%
Independent	David Jones*	Unopposed		
Independent hold		Swing		

=== Conwil (two seats) ===
Conwil 1928
Party	Candidate	Votes	%	±%
Independent	John Jones Evans*	Unopposed		
Independent	J.W.L. Harries	Unopposed		
Independent hold		Swing		
Independent hold		Swing		

=== Laugharne Parish (one seat) ===
Laugharne Parish 1928
Party	Candidate	Votes	%	±%
Independent	David James*	Unopposed		
Independent hold		Swing		

=== Laugharne Township (one seat) ===
Laugharne Township 1928
Party	Candidate	Votes	%	±%
Independent	Benjamin Edmunds*	Unopposed		
Independent hold		Swing		

=== Llanarthney North Ward (one seat) ===
Llanarthney North Ward 1928
Party	Candidate	Votes	%	±%
Independent	William Williams*	178		
Independent	John Davies	117		
Independent hold		Swing		

=== Llanarthney South Ward (two seats) ===
Llanarthney South Ward 1928
Party	Candidate	Votes	%	±%
Independent	William Brazell*	Unopposed		
Labour	Thomas Thomas*	Unopposed		
Independent hold		Swing		
Labour hold		Swing		

=== Llandawke and Llansadurnen (one seat) ===
Llandawke and Llansadurnen 1928
Party	Candidate	Votes	%	±%
Independent	George Alfred Lewis*	Unopposed		
Independent hold		Swing		

=== Llanddarog (one seat) ===
Llanddarog 1928
Party	Candidate	Votes	%	±%
Independent	James William Lewis*	Unopposed		
Independent hold		Swing		

=== Llandeilo Abercowyn and Llangynog (one seat) ===
Llandeilo Abercowyn and Llangynog 1928
Party	Candidate	Votes	%	±%
Independent	William Lewis	Unopposed		
Independent hold		Swing		

=== Llanddowror (one seat) ===
Llanddowror 1928
Party	Candidate	Votes	%	±%
Independent	Thomas Henry David*	Unopposed		
Independent hold		Swing		

=== Llandyfaelog (one seat) ===
Llandyfaelog 1928
Party	Candidate	Votes	%	±%
Independent	Morris Davies*	195		
Independent	David Jones	124		
Independent	Edgar Harries Stephens	98		
Independent hold		Swing		

=== Llanfihangel Abercowin (one seat) ===
Llanfihangel Abercowin 1928
Party	Candidate	Votes	%	±%
Independent	Joseph Thomas	215		
Independent	John Walters	61		
Independent	William Lewis	78		
Independent hold		Swing		

=== Llangain (one seat) ===
Llangain 1928
Party	Candidate	Votes	%	±%
Independent	John Lewis*	Unopposed		
Independent hold		Swing		

=== Llangendeirne (two seats) ===
Llangendeirne 1928
Party	Candidate	Votes	%	±%
Labour	Richard Williams*	717		
Independent	William Thomas	623		
Independent	Ebenezer Jones	305		
Labour hold		Swing		
Independent hold		Swing		

=== Llangunnor (one seat) ===
Llangunnor 1928
Party	Candidate	Votes	%	±%
Independent	John Moses*	Unopposed		
Independent hold		Swing		

=== Llangynin (one seat) ===
Llangynin 1928
Party	Candidate	Votes	%	±%
Independent	John Thomas Williams*	Unopposed		
Independent hold		Swing		

=== Llanllawddog (one seat) ===
Llanllawddog 1928
Party	Candidate	Votes	%	±%
Independent	Ll.P.Ll. Lloyd*	Unopposed		
Independent hold		Swing		

=== Llanpumsaint (one seat) ===
Llanpumsaint 1928
Party	Candidate	Votes	%	±%
Independent	John Johns	151		
Independent	Thomas John Thomas	134		
Independent hold		Swing		

=== Llanstephan (one seat) ===
Llanstephan 1928
Party	Candidate	Votes	%	±%
Independent	John Llewelyn Richards*	Unopposed		
Independent hold		Swing		

=== Llanwinio (one seat) ===
Llanwinio 1928
Party	Candidate	Votes	%	±%
Independent	John Morris*	Unopposed		
Independent hold		Swing		

=== Merthyr (one seat) ===
Merthyr 1928
Party	Candidate	Votes	%	±%
Independent	John Lloyd Thomas*	Unopposed		
Independent hold		Swing		

=== Mydrim (one seat) ===
Mydrim 1928
Party	Candidate	Votes	%	±%
Independent	Henry Daniel Jenkins	101		
Independent	David Henry Lewis	94		
Independent	William Calvin Lewis	81		
Independent hold		Swing		

=== Newchurch (one seat) ===
Newchurch 1928
Party	Candidate	Votes	%	±%
Independent	William Hughes	Unopposed		
Independent hold		Swing		

=== St Clears (one seat) ===
St Clears 1928
Party	Candidate	Votes	%	±%
Independent	John Thomas Davies*	Unopposed		
Independent hold		Swing		

=== St Ishmaels (two seats) ===
St Ishmaels 1928
Party	Candidate	Votes	%	±%
Independent	Thomas Harries*	Unopposed		
Independent	Evan Wilkins*	Unopposed		
Independent hold		Swing		
Independent hold		Swing		

=== Trelech a'r Betws (two seats) ===
Trelech a'r Betws 1928
Party	Candidate	Votes	%	±%
Independent	David John Davies*	Unopposed		
Independent	S.O. Thomas	Unopposed		
Independent hold		Swing		
Independent hold		Swing		

== Carmarthen Board of Guardians ==
All members of the District Council also served as members of Carmarthen Board of Guardians. In addition six members were elected to represent the borough of Carmarthen. All six sitting members were returned unopposed.

=== Carmarthen (six seats) ===
Carmarthen 1919
Party	Candidate	Votes	%	±%
Independent	David Hinds	Unopposed		
Independent	John Dyfnallt Owen	Unopposed		
Independent	Andrew Fuller-Mills*	Unopposed		
Independent	Thomas Williams	Unopposed		
Independent	G.W. Whicher	Unopposed		
Independent	Georgina M.E. White*	Unopposed		
Independent hold		Swing		
Independent hold		Swing		
Independent hold		Swing		
Independent hold		Swing		
Independent hold		Swing		
Independent hold		Swing		
