= 1935 Carmarthen Rural District Council election =

Council election in Wales

An election to the Carmarthen Rural District Council in Wales was held on 1 April 1935. The election was held following the merger of the Carmarthen and Whitland rural districts and the need to reduce the total number of members on the new authority from 53 to 35. Following a recommendation made in 1932, it was decided that the rural districts of Carmarthen and Whitland would be merged. A more drastic proposal to combine the rural districts of Carmarthen, Llanybydder, Newcastle Emlyn and Whitland, together with Newcastle Emlyn UDC, was rejected. Elections were held in wards that had been amalgamated and also in wards where the number of councillors had been reduced.

It was preceded by the 1934 election and followed by the 1937 election which would be the first time that a whole council would be elected for the merged authority.

== Boundary changes ==
A number of boundary changes resulted from the amalgamation of Whitland RDC into Carmarthen RDC.

- The number of councillors representing the following parishes was reduced from two to One: Abergwili, Conwil Elvet, St Ishmaels and Trelech a'r Betws.
- The parishes of Laugharne, Llandawke and Llansadurnen, and Llanddowror were merged to form a two-member ward to be known as Llanddowror
- The parishes of Newchurch and Merthyr were merged to form a single ward electing one councillor
- The parishes of Llangynin and Llanwinio were merged to form a single ward electing one councillor

In addition the whole of the Whitland RDC area was amalgamated with Carmarthen RDC. There were twenty members on the former Whitland RDC but following the amalgamation of parishes this was reduced to nine members of the new authority.

== Candidates ==
Most of the candidates who contested the election were sitting members. There were unopposed returns in eight wards.

== Outcome ==
There was no change to the political composition of the authority as a result of the election. A woman member was elected to the council for the first time.

== Ward results (Carmarthen RDC wards) ==
=== Abergwili (one seat) ===
Abergwili 1935
Party	Candidate	Votes	%	±%
Independent	Thomas Duncan Dempster*	Unopposed		
Independent win (new seat)				

=== Conwil (one seat) ===
Conwil 1935
Party	Candidate	Votes	%	±%
Independent	John Walter Lloyd Harries*	357		
Independent	George Sidney Cole	79		
Independent win (new seat)				

=== Llanddowror (two seats) ===
Llanddowror 1935
Party	Candidate	Votes	%	±%
Independent	Henry Rhys Jones*	187		
Independent	George Alfred Lewis*	91		
Independent	Evan Morris Williams	61		
Independent win (new seat)				
Independent win (new seat)				

=== Newchurch (one seat) ===
Newchurch 1935
Party	Candidate	Votes	%	±%
Independent	William David Lewis*	Unopposed		
Independent win (new seat)				

=== Llangynin and Llanwinio (one seat) ===
Llangynin and Llanwinio 1935
Party	Candidate	Votes	%	±%
Independent	John Jones	Unopposed		
Independent win (new seat)				

=== St Ishmaels (one seat) ===
St Ishmaels 1935
Party	Candidate	Votes	%	±%
Independent	Evan Wilkins*	303		
Independent	William Morgan*	207		
Independent win (new seat)				

=== Trelech a'r Betws (one seat) ===
Trelech a'r Betws 1935
Party	Candidate	Votes	%	±%
Independent	Simon Owen Thomas*	Unopposed		
Independent hold		Swing		

== Ward Results (Whitland RDC wards) ==
=== Cilymaenllwyd (one seat) ===
Cilymaenllwyd 1935
Party	Candidate	Votes	%	±%
Independent	David Garrick Protheroe*	Unopposed		
Independent win (new seat)				

=== Eglwyscummin (one seat) ===
Eglwyscummin 1935
Party	Candidate	Votes	%	±%
Independent	Joseph Howells*	Unopposed		
Independent win (new seat)				

=== Henllanfallteg (one seat) ===
Henllanfallteg 1935
Party	Candidate	Votes	%	±%
Independent	James Howells	95		
Independent	Benjamin E. Williams	63		
Independent win (new seat)				

=== Llanboidy Ward No.1 (one seat) ===
Llanboidy Ward No.1 1935
Party	Candidate	Votes	%	±%
Independent		Unopposed		
Independent hold		Swing		

=== Llanboidy Ward No.2 (one seat) ===
Llanboidy Ward No.2 1935
Party	Candidate	Votes	%	±%
Independent	John Jones*	Unopposed		
Independent win (new seat)				

=== Llandissilio East (one seat) ===
Llandissilio East 1935
Party	Candidate	Votes	%	±%
Independent	John Devonald Williams*	Unopposed		
Independent win (new seat)				

=== Whitland (two seats) ===
Whitland 1935
Party	Candidate	Votes	%	±%
Independent	Hannah Mary Rees*	330		
Independent	William Hughes Mathias*	270		
Independent	William Sandbrook Cole*	250		
Independent	Joseph R. Thomas	152		
Independent win (new seat)				
Independent win (new seat)				
