= 1925 Carmarthen Rural District Council election =

Welsh local election

An election to the Carmarthen Rural District Council in Wales was held in April 1925. It was preceded by the 1922 election and was followed by the 1928 election. The successful candidates were also elected to the Carmarthen Board of Guardians.

== Overview of the results ==
Many Independent candidates were returned unopposed and only a small number of wards were contested by Labour candidates.

== Ward results ==
=== Abergwili (two seats) ===
Abergwili 1925
| Party | Candidate | Votes | % | ±% |
|---|---|---|---|---|
| Independent | Thomas Duncan Dempster* | 289 | | |
| Independent | Evan Griffiths | 236 | | |
| Independent | David Phillips | 232 | | |
| Labour | David Davies | 149 | | |
| Independent | Richard Davies | 88 | | |
| Independent hold | | Swing | | |
| Independent hold | | Swing | | |

=== Abernant (one seat) ===
Abernant 1925
| Party | Candidate | Votes | % | ±% |
|---|---|---|---|---|
| Independent | David Jones* | Unopposed | | |
| Independent hold | | Swing | | |

=== Conwil (two seats) ===
Conwil 1925
| Party | Candidate | Votes | % | ±% |
|---|---|---|---|---|
| Independent | David Jones* | 281 | | |
| Independent | John Jones Evans* | 248 | | |
| Independent | Thomas Davies | 213 | | |
| Independent hold | | Swing | | |
| Independent hold | | Swing | | |

=== Laugharne Parish (one seat) ===
Laugharne Parish 1925
| Party | Candidate | Votes | % | ±% |
|---|---|---|---|---|
| Independent | David James | 95 | | |
| Independent | Thomas Jenkins* | 62 | | |
| Independent hold | | Swing | | |

=== Laugharne Township (one seat) ===
Laugharne Township 1925
| Party | Candidate | Votes | % | ±% |
|---|---|---|---|---|
| Independent | Benjamin Edmunds* | Unopposed | | |
| Independent hold | | Swing | | |

=== Llanarthney North Ward (one seat) ===
Llanarthney North Ward 1925
| Party | Candidate | Votes | % | ±% |
|---|---|---|---|---|
| Independent | William Williams* | Unopposed | | |
| Independent hold | | Swing | | |

=== Llanarthney South Ward (two seats) ===
Llanarthney South Ward 1925
| Party | Candidate | Votes | % | ±% |
|---|---|---|---|---|
| Independent | William Brazell* | Unopposed | | |
| Labour | Thomas Thomas* | Unopposed | | |
| Independent hold | | Swing | | |
| Labour hold | | Swing | | |

=== Llandawke and Llansadurnen (one seat) ===
Llandawke and Llansadurnen 1925
| Party | Candidate | Votes | % | ±% |
|---|---|---|---|---|
| Independent | George Alfred Lewis | 35 | | |
| Independent | Thomas James Howell | 27 | | |
| Independent hold | | Swing | | |

=== Llanddarog (one seat) ===
Llanddarog 1925
| Party | Candidate | Votes | % | ±% |
|---|---|---|---|---|
| Independent | James William Lewis* | 262 | | |
| Independent | William Walters | 102 | | |
| Independent hold | | Swing | | |

=== Llandeilo Abercowyn and Llangynog (one seat) ===
Llandeilo Abercowyn and Llangynog 1925
| Party | Candidate | Votes | % | ±% |
|---|---|---|---|---|
| Independent | John Griffiths* | Unopposed | | |
| Independent hold | | Swing | | |

=== Llanddowror (one seat) ===
Llanddowror 1925
| Party | Candidate | Votes | % | ±% |
|---|---|---|---|---|
| Independent | Thomas Henry David | Unopposed | | |
| Independent hold | | Swing | | |

=== Llandyfaelog (one seat) ===
Llandyfaelog 1925
| Party | Candidate | Votes | % | ±% |
|---|---|---|---|---|
| Independent | Morris Davies* | Unopposed | | |
| Independent hold | | Swing | | |

=== Llanfihangel Abercowin (one seat) ===
Llanfihangel Abercowin 1925
| Party | Candidate | Votes | % | ±% |
|---|---|---|---|---|
| Independent | John Evans* | Unopposed | | |
| Independent hold | | Swing | | |

=== Llangain (one seat) ===
Llangain 1925
| Party | Candidate | Votes | % | ±% |
|---|---|---|---|---|
| Independent | John Lewis* | Unopposed | | |
| Independent hold | | Swing | | |

=== Llangendeirne (two seats) ===
Llangendeirne 1925
| Party | Candidate | Votes | % | ±% |
|---|---|---|---|---|
| Independent | Thomas Rees | Unopposed | | |
| Labour | Richard Williams* | Unopposed | | |
| Independent hold | | Swing | | |
| Labour hold | | Swing | | |

=== Llangunnor (one seat) ===
Llangunnor 1925
| Party | Candidate | Votes | % | ±% |
|---|---|---|---|---|
| Independent | John Moses | Unopposed | | |
| Independent hold | | Swing | | |

=== Llangynin (one seat) ===
Llangynin 1925
| Party | Candidate | Votes | % | ±% |
|---|---|---|---|---|
| Independent | John Thomas Williams* | Unopposed | | |
| Independent hold | | Swing | | |

=== Llanllawddog (one seat) ===
Llanllawddog 1919
| Party | Candidate | Votes | % | ±% |
|---|---|---|---|---|
| Independent | Evan Jones | 103 | | |
| Independent | John Jones | 67 | | |
| Independent hold | | Swing | | |

=== Llanpumsaint (one seat) ===
Llanpumsaint 1919
| Party | Candidate | Votes | % | ±% |
|---|---|---|---|---|
| Independent | David Richards | 145 | | |
| Independent | John Jones | 127 | | |
| Independent hold | | Swing | | |

=== Llanstephan (one seat) ===
Llanstephan 1925
| Party | Candidate | Votes | % | ±% |
|---|---|---|---|---|
| Independent | John Llewelyn Richards* | Unopposed | | |
| Independent hold | | Swing | | |

=== Llanwinio (one seat) ===
Llanwinio 1925
| Party | Candidate | Votes | % | ±% |
|---|---|---|---|---|
| Independent | John Morris* | Unopposed | | |
| Independent hold | | Swing | | |

=== Merthyr (one seat) ===
Merthyr 1925
| Party | Candidate | Votes | % | ±% |
|---|---|---|---|---|
| Independent | John Lloyd Thomas* | Unopposed | | |
| Independent hold | | Swing | | |

=== Mydrim (one seat) ===
Mydrim 1925
| Party | Candidate | Votes | % | ±% |
|---|---|---|---|---|
| Independent | David Thomas | Unopposed | | |
| Independent hold | | Swing | | |

=== Newchurch (one seat) ===
Newchurch 1919
| Party | Candidate | Votes | % | ±% |
|---|---|---|---|---|
| Independent | Thomas Lewis | 108 | | |
| Independent | Richard Jeremy* | 100 | | |
| Independent hold | | Swing | | |

=== St Clears (one seat) ===
St Clears 1925
| Party | Candidate | Votes | % | ±% |
|---|---|---|---|---|
| Independent | John Thomas Davies* | Unopposed | | |
| Independent hold | | Swing | | |

=== St Ishmaels (one seat) ===
St Ishmaels 1925
| Party | Candidate | Votes | % | ±% |
|---|---|---|---|---|
| Independent | Evan Wilkins | Unopposed | | |
| Independent hold | | Swing | | |

=== Trelech a'r Betws (two seats) ===
Trelech a'r Betws 1925
| Party | Candidate | Votes | % | ±% |
|---|---|---|---|---|
| Independent | David John Davies | Unopposed | | |
| Independent | Richard Emment Rees* | Unopposed | | |
| Independent hold | | Swing | | |
| Independent hold | | Swing | | |

== Carmarthen Board of Guardians ==
All members of the District Council also served as members of Carmarthen Board of Guardians. In addition six members were elected to represent the borough of Carmarthen. All six sitting members were returned unopposed.

=== Carmarthen (six seats) ===
Carmarthen 1919
| Party | Candidate | Votes | % | ±% |
|---|---|---|---|---|
| Independent | David Hinds | Unopposed | | |
| Independent | John Dyfnallt Owen | Unopposed | | |
| Independent | Andrew Fuller-Mills* | Unopposed | | |
| Independent | Thomas Williams | Unopposed | | |
| Independent | G.W. Whicher | Unopposed | | |
| Independent | Georgina M.E. White* | Unopposed | | |
| Independent hold | | Swing | | |
| Independent hold | | Swing | | |
| Independent hold | | Swing | | |
| Independent hold | | Swing | | |
| Independent hold | | Swing | | |
| Independent hold | | Swing | | |
