= 1919 Carmarthen Rural District Council election =

Welsh local election

An election to the Carmarthen Rural District Council in Wales was held in April 1919. It was preceded by the 1913 election due to the scheduled 1916 election being postponed due to the First World War, and was followed by the 1922 election. Eleven members were returned unopposed and, in addition, the retiring member was returned for Llandawke and Llansadurnen after no nominations were received. The successful candidates were also elected to the Carmarthen Board of Guardians.

== Overview of the results ==
These were the first elections for six years and a number of sitting members were defeated. Labour candidates stood for the first time. In Llanarthney, both were heavily defeated but in Llangendeirne, Richard Williams defeated long-serving member D.T. Gilbert by two votes. In St Ishmaels, Rosina Davies, a prominent figure in the 1904-05 Religious Revival sought election but finished bottom of the poll.

== Ward results ==
=== Abergwili (two seats) ===
Abergwili 1919
| Party | Candidate | Votes | % | ±% |
|---|---|---|---|---|
| Independent | William Williams* | 313 | | |
| Independent | John Williams* | 267 | | |
| Independent | John Skyrme | 83 | | |
| Independent hold | | Swing | | |
| Independent hold | | Swing | | |

=== Abernant (one seat) ===
Abernant 1919
| Party | Candidate | Votes | % | ±% |
|---|---|---|---|---|
| Independent | David Jones | Unopposed | | |
| Independent hold | | Swing | | |

=== Conwil (two seats) ===
Conwil 1919
| Party | Candidate | Votes | % | ±% |
|---|---|---|---|---|
| Independent | J.J. Evans | 277 | | |
| Independent | John Evans* | 245 | | |
| Independent | John Davies | 153 | | |
| Independent hold | | Swing | | |
| Independent hold | | Swing | | |

=== Laugharne Parish (one seat) ===
Laugharne Parish 1919
| Party | Candidate | Votes | % | ±% |
|---|---|---|---|---|
| Independent | Thomas Jenkins | Unopposed | | |
| Independent hold | | Swing | | |

=== Laugharne Township (one seat) ===
Laugharne Township 1919
| Party | Candidate | Votes | % | ±% |
|---|---|---|---|---|
| Independent | John Jones* | Unopposed | | |
| Independent hold | | Swing | | |

=== Llanarthney (two seats) ===
Llanarthney 1919
| Party | Candidate | Votes | % | ±% |
|---|---|---|---|---|
| Independent | David Stephens* | 662 | | |
| Independent | William Brazell* | 546 | | |
| Labour | Thomas Thomas | 223 | | |
| Labour | Henry Davies | 115 | | |
| Independent hold | | Swing | | |
| Independent hold | | Swing | | |

=== Llandawke and Llansadurnen (one seat) ===
No nomination was received therefore the retiring member was returned unopposed.

Llandawke and Llansadurnen 1919
| Party | Candidate | Votes | % | ±% |
|---|---|---|---|---|
| Independent | W.R. Rees* | Unopposed | | |
| Independent hold | | Swing | | |

=== Llanddarog (one seat) ===
Llanddarog 1913
| Party | Candidate | Votes | % | ±% |
|---|---|---|---|---|
| Independent | James William Lewis* | 138 | | |
| Independent | John Grugos Williams | 95 | | |
| Independent hold | | Swing | | |

=== Llandeilo Abercowyn and Llangynog (one seat) ===
Llandeilo Abercowyn and Llangynog 1919
| Party | Candidate | Votes | % | ±% |
|---|---|---|---|---|
| Independent | John Griffiths | Unopposed | | |
| Independent hold | | Swing | | |

=== Llanddowror (one seat) ===
Llanddowror 1919
| Party | Candidate | Votes | % | ±% |
|---|---|---|---|---|
| Independent | Benjamin Thomas | 36 | | |
| Independent | T.H. David | 33 | | |
| Independent hold | | Swing | | |

=== Llandyfaelog (one seat) ===
Llandyfaelog 1919
| Party | Candidate | Votes | % | ±% |
|---|---|---|---|---|
| Independent | William Bowen | 220 | | |
| Independent | Edgar Stephens | 112 | | |
| Independent hold | | Swing | | |

=== Llanfihangel Abercowin (one seat) ===
Llanfihangel Abercowin 1919
| Party | Candidate | Votes | % | ±% |
|---|---|---|---|---|
| Independent | Benjamin Jones | Unopposed | | |
| Independent hold | | Swing | | |

=== Llangain (one seat) ===
Llangain 1919
| Party | Candidate | Votes | % | ±% |
|---|---|---|---|---|
| Independent | Rev Evan Jones | Unopposed | | |
| Independent hold | | Swing | | |

=== Llangendeirne (two seats) ===
Llangendeirne 1919
| Party | Candidate | Votes | % | ±% |
|---|---|---|---|---|
| Independent | Thomas Thomas | 484 | | |
| Labour | Richard Williams | 303 | | |
| Independent | D.T. Gilbert* | 301 | | |
| Labour | D. Williams | 209 | | |
| Independent hold | | Swing | | |
| Labour gain from Independent | | Swing | | |

=== Llangunnor (one seat) ===
Llangunnor 1919
| Party | Candidate | Votes | % | ±% |
|---|---|---|---|---|
| Independent | Thomas Roberts | 190 | | |
| Independent | John Moses | 134 | | |
| Independent hold | | Swing | | |

=== Llangynin (one seat) ===
Llangynin 1919
| Party | Candidate | Votes | % | ±% |
|---|---|---|---|---|
| Independent | John Thomas Williams* | Unopposed | | |
| Independent hold | | Swing | | |

=== Llanllawddog (one seat) ===
Llanllawddog 1919
| Party | Candidate | Votes | % | ±% |
|---|---|---|---|---|
| Independent | Evan Jones | 103 | | |
| Independent | John Jones | 67 | | |
| Independent hold | | Swing | | |

=== Llanpumsaint (one seat) ===
Llanpumsaint 1919
| Party | Candidate | Votes | % | ±% |
|---|---|---|---|---|
| Independent | David Richards | 145 | | |
| Independent | John Jones | 127 | | |
| Independent hold | | Swing | | |

=== Llanstephan (one seat) ===
Llanstephan 1919
| Party | Candidate | Votes | % | ±% |
|---|---|---|---|---|
| Independent | John Llewelyn Richards* | Unopposed | | |
| Independent hold | | Swing | | |

=== Llanwinio (one seat) ===
Llanwinio 1919
| Party | Candidate | Votes | % | ±% |
|---|---|---|---|---|
| Independent | William Williams | 127 | | |
| Independent | George R. Thomas | 72 | | |
| Independent hold | | Swing | | |

=== Merthyr (one seat) ===
Merthyr 1919
| Party | Candidate | Votes | % | ±% |
|---|---|---|---|---|
| Independent | William J. Davies | 65 | | |
| Independent | Thomas Davies* | 30 | | |
| Independent hold | | Swing | | |

=== Mydrim (one seat) ===
Mydrim 1919
| Party | Candidate | Votes | % | ±% |
|---|---|---|---|---|
| Independent | Thomas O. Harries | 127 | | |
| Independent | Morris J. Evans* | 117 | | |
| Independent hold | | Swing | | |

=== Newchurch (one seat) ===
Newchurch 1919
| Party | Candidate | Votes | % | ±% |
|---|---|---|---|---|
| Independent | Thomas Lewis | 108 | | |
| Independent | Richard Jeremy* | 100 | | |
| Independent hold | | Swing | | |

=== St Clears (one seat) ===
St Clears 1919
| Party | Candidate | Votes | % | ±% |
|---|---|---|---|---|
| Independent | Benjamin Salmon* | Unopposed | | |
| Independent hold | | Swing | | |

=== St Ishmaels (one seat) ===
St Ishmaels 1919
| Party | Candidate | Votes | % | ±% |
|---|---|---|---|---|
| Independent | John Beynon | 182 | | |
| Independent | Rev Henry R. Charles | 143 | | |
| Independent | David Lewis | 69 | | |
| Independent | Rosina Davies | 25 | | |
| Independent hold | | Swing | | |

=== Trelech a'r Betws (two seats) ===
Trelech a'r Betws 1919
| Party | Candidate | Votes | % | ±% |
|---|---|---|---|---|
| Independent | Lewis Lodwick Bowen | Unopposed | | |
| Independent | R.E. Rees | Unopposed | | |
| Independent hold | | Swing | | |
| Independent hold | | Swing | | |

== Carmarthen Board of Guardians ==
All members of the District Council also served as members of Carmarthen Board of Guardians. In addition six members were elected to represent the borough of Carmarthen. All six sitting members were returned unopposed.

=== Carmarthen (six seats) ===
Carmarthen 1919
| Party | Candidate | Votes | % | ±% |
|---|---|---|---|---|
| Independent | David Hinds | Unopposed | | |
| Independent | John Dyfnallt Owen | Unopposed | | |
| Independent | Andrew Fuller-Mills* | Unopposed | | |
| Independent | Thomas Williams | Unopposed | | |
| Independent | G.W. Whicher | Unopposed | | |
| Independent | Georgina M.E. White* | Unopposed | | |
| Independent hold | | | | |
| Independent hold | | | | |
| Independent hold | | | | |
| Independent hold | | | | |
| Independent hold | | | | |
| Independent hold | | | | |
