= 1934 Carmarthen Rural District Council election =

1934 Welsh local government election

An election to the Carmarthen Rural District Council in Wales was held on 26 March 1934. A large number of candidates had been returned unopposed with only six wards being contested.

It was preceded by the 1931 election and was the last election conducted prior to the implementation of a review into district boundaries in Carmarthenshire. Following a recommendation made in 1932, it was decided that the rural districts of Carmarthen and Whitland would be merged. A more drastic proposal to combine the rural districts of Carmarthen, Llanybydder, Newcastle Emlyn and Whitland, together with Newcastle Emlyn UDC, was rejected.

A partial election would be held in 1935 in seats where wards would be amalgamated or the number of seats reduced as a result of re-organization. Members unaffected by the changes would remain in post. The 1937 election would be the first time that a whole council would be elected for the merged authority.

== Boundary changes ==
There were no boundary changes at this election.

== Outcome ==
Once again, the vast majority of candidates were Independents and the majority were returned unopposed. However, Labour gained three seats, including two at Llanarthney, reversing the loss of a seat there in 1931. Labour also won the Llanddarog ward, defeating J.W. Lewis, the father of the Council who had represented the seat for 25 years.

== Ward results ==
=== Abergwili (two seats) ===
Abergwili 1934
Party	Candidate	Votes	%	±%
Independent	Thomas Duncan Dempster*	Unopposed		
Independent	Evan Griffiths*	Unopposed		
Independent hold		Swing		
Independent hold		Swing		

=== Abernant (one seat) ===
Abernant 1934
Party	Candidate	Votes	%	±%
Independent	David Jones*	Unopposed		
Independent hold		Swing		

=== Conwil (two seats) ===
Conwil 1934
Party	Candidate	Votes	%	±%
Independent	John Walter Lloyd Harries*	Unopposed		
Independent	William H. Phillips	Unopposed		
Independent hold		Swing		
Independent hold		Swing		

=== Laugharne Parish (one seat) ===
Laugharne Parish 1934
Party	Candidate	Votes	%	±%
Independent	Henry Rhys Jones	Unopposed		
Independent hold		Swing		

=== Laugharne Township (one seat) ===
Laugharne Township 1934
Party	Candidate	Votes	%	±%
Independent	John Evans Williams	Unopposed		
Independent hold		Swing		

=== Llanarthney North Ward (one seat) ===
Llanarthney North Ward 1934
Party	Candidate	Votes	%	±%
Independent	John Thomas	167		
Independent	Thomas Jones*	167		
Independent hold		Swing		

=== Llanarthney South Ward (two seats) ===
Llanarthney South Ward 1934
Party	Candidate	Votes	%	±%
Labour	William Evans	718		
Labour	David Morgan Davies	716		
Independent	Daniel Davies	411		
Labour gain from Independent		Swing		
Labour gain from Independent		Swing		

=== Llandawke and Llansadurnen (one seat) ===
Llandawke and Llansadurnen 1928
Party	Candidate	Votes	%	±%
Independent	George Alfred Lewis*	Unopposed		
Independent hold		Swing		

=== Llanddarog (one seat) ===
Llanddarog 1934
Party	Candidate	Votes	%	±%
Labour	Gwilym Rees	251		
Independent	James William Lewis*	198		
Labour gain from Independent		Swing		

=== Llandeilo Abercowyn and Llangynog (one seat) ===
Llandeilo Abercowyn and Llangynog 1934
Party	Candidate	Votes	%	±%
Independent	Joseph Thomas*	Unopposed		
Independent hold		Swing		

=== Llanddowror (one seat) ===
Llanddowror 1928
Party	Candidate	Votes	%	±%
Independent	Thomas Henry David*	Unopposed		
Independent hold		Swing		

=== Llandyfaelog (one seat) ===
Llandyfaelog 1934
Party	Candidate	Votes	%	±%
Independent	Morris Davies*	Unopposed		
Independent hold		Swing		

=== Llanfihangel Abercowin (one seat) ===
Llanfihangel Abercowin 1934
Party	Candidate	Votes	%	±%
Independent	Johnny Joshua	143		
Independent	John Thomas	121		
Independent hold		Swing		

=== Llangain (one seat) ===
Llangain 1934
Party	Candidate	Votes	%	±%
Independent	John Lewis*	Unopposed		
Independent hold		Swing		

=== Llangendeirne (two seats) ===
Llangendeirne 1934
Party	Candidate	Votes	%	±%
Independent	William Thomas*	Unopposed		
Labour	Richard Williams*	Unopposed		
Independent hold		Swing		
Labour hold		Swing		

=== Llangunnor (one seat) ===
Llangunnor 1934
Party	Candidate	Votes	%	±%
Independent	David John Jones*	Unopposed		
Independent hold		Swing		

=== Llangynin (one seat) ===
Llangynin 1934
Party	Candidate	Votes	%	±%
Independent	John Thomas Williams*	Unopposed		
Independent hold		Swing		

=== Llanllawddog (one seat) ===
Llanllawddog 1934
Party	Candidate	Votes	%	±%
Independent	George Dyer*	Unopposed		
Independent hold		Swing		

=== Llanpumsaint (one seat) ===
Llanpumsaint 1931
Party	Candidate	Votes	%	±%
Independent	Samuel Evans	Unopposed		
Independent hold		Swing		

=== Llanstephan (one seat) ===
Llanstephan 1934
Party	Candidate	Votes	%	±%
Independent	John Llewelyn Richards*	Unopposed		
Independent hold		Swing		

=== Llanwinio (one seat) ===
Llanwinio 1934
Party	Candidate	Votes	%	±%
Independent	David Thomas Davies	Unopposed		
Independent hold		Swing		

=== Merthyr (one seat) ===
Merthyr 1931
Party	Candidate	Votes	%	±%
Independent	David James Evans		50	
Independent	Evan Rees Evans		28	
Independent	Lewis Evans		27	
Independent	Thomas Evans		21	
Independent hold		Swing		

=== Mydrim (one seat) ===
Mydrim 1934
Party	Candidate	Votes	%	±%
Independent	Henry Daniel Jenkins*	Unopposed		
Independent hold		Swing		

=== Newchurch (one seat) ===
Newchurch 1934
Party	Candidate	Votes	%	±%
Independent	William Hughes*	Unopposed		
Independent hold		Swing		

=== St Clears (one seat) ===
St Clears 1934
Party	Candidate	Votes	%	±%
Independent	David Theophilus Davies	Unopposed		
Independent hold		Swing		

=== St Ishmaels (two seats) ===
St Ishmaels 1934
Party	Candidate	Votes	%	±%
Independent	William Morgan	Unopposed		
Independent	Evan Wilkins*	Unopposed		
Independent hold		Swing		
Independent hold		Swing		

=== Trelech a'r Betws (two seats) ===
Trelech a'r Betws 1934
Party	Candidate	Votes	%	±%
Independent	Simon Owen Thomas*	Unopposed		
Independent	Henry Trevor Williams*	Unopposed		
Independent hold		Swing		
Independent hold		Swing		
