= 1898 Carmarthen Rural District Council election =

Welsh local election

The second election to the Carmarthen Rural District Council was held in April 1898. It was preceded by the 1894 election and followed by the 1901 election. The successful candidates were also elected to the Carmarthen Board of Guardians.

There were unopposed returns in most wards at this election with some candidates withdrawing soon after nomination day to remove the need for a contest.

== Ward results ==
=== Abergwili (two seats) ===
Abergwili 1898
Party	Candidate	Votes	%	±%
Independent	David Davies*	Unopposed		
Independent	John Griffiths*	Unopposed		
Independent hold		Swing		
Independent hold		Swing		

=== Abernant (one seat) ===
Abernant 1898
Party	Candidate	Votes	%	±%
Independent	Thomas Pugh	Unopposed		
Independent hold		Swing		

=== Conwil (two seats) ===
Conwil 1898
Party	Candidate	Votes	%	±%
Independent	David Thomas*	Unopposed		
Independent	John Thomas	Unopposed		
Independent hold		Swing		
Independent hold		Swing		

=== Laugharne Parish (one seat) ===
Laugharne Parish 1898
Party	Candidate	Votes	%	±%
Independent	J.R. John*	Unopposed		
Independent hold		Swing		

=== Laugharne Township (one seat) ===
Laugharne Township 1898
Party	Candidate	Votes	%	±%
Independent	William Thomas*	unopposed		
Independent hold		Swing		

=== Llanarthney (two seats) ===
Llanarthney 1898
Party	Candidate	Votes	%	±%
Independent	Stephen Stephens*	Unopposed		
Independent	William J. Thomas*	Unopposed		
Independent hold		Swing		
Independent hold		Swing		

=== Llandawke and Llansadurnen (one seat) ===
Llandawke and Llansadurnen 1898
Party	Candidate	Votes	%	±%
Independent	William S. Morse	Unopposed		
Independent hold		Swing		

=== Llanddarog (one seat) ===
Llanddarog 1898
Party	Candidate	Votes	%	±%
Independent	John Davies	Unopposed		
Independent hold		Swing		

=== Llandeilo Abercowyn and Llangynog (one seat) ===
Llandeilo Abercowyn and Llangynog 1898
Party	Candidate	Votes	%	±%
Independent	David Harries	Unopposed		
Independent hold		Swing		

=== Llanddowror (one seat) ===
Llanddowror 1898
Party	Candidate	Votes	%	±%
Independent	Rev Thomas Jones*	Unopposed		
Independent hold		Swing		

=== Llandyfaelog (one seat) ===
Llandyfaelog 1898
Party	Candidate	Votes	%	±%
Independent	Thomas Rees*	Unopposed		
Independent hold		Swing		

=== Llanfihangel Abercowin (one seat) ===
Llanfihangel Abercowin 1898
Party	Candidate	Votes	%	±%
Independent	David Thomas*	Unopposed		
Independent hold		Swing		

=== Llangain (one seat) ===
Llangain 1898
Party	Candidate	Votes	%	±%
Independent	William Williams	Unopposed		
Independent hold		Swing		

=== Llangunnor (one seat) ===
Llangunnor 1898
Party	Candidate	Votes	%	±%
Independent	Herbert Griffiths	Unopposed		
Independent hold		Swing		

=== Llanllawddog (one seat) ===
Llanllawddog 1898
Party	Candidate	Votes	%	±%
Independent	Evan Daniel*	Unopposed		
Independent hold		Swing		

=== Llanpumsaint (one seat) ===
Llanpumsaint 1898
Party	Candidate	Votes	%	±%
Independent	Evan Jones	Unopposed		
Independent hold		Swing		

=== Llanstephan (one seat) ===
Llanstephan 1898
Party	Candidate	Votes	%	±%
Independent	Griffith Barrett Evans*	Unopposed		
Independent hold		Swing		

=== Llanwinio (one seat) ===
Llanwinio 1898
Party	Candidate	Votes	%	±%
Independent	John Phillips	Unopposed		
Independent hold		Swing		

=== Merthyr (one seat) ===
Merthyr 1898
Party	Candidate	Votes	%	±%
Independent	David Evans*	Unopposed		
Independent hold		Swing		

=== Mydrim (one seat) ===
Mydrim 1898
Party	Candidate	Votes	%	±%
Independent	John Anthony	Unopposed		
Independent hold		Swing		

=== Newchurch (one seat) ===
Newchurch 1898
Party	Candidate	Votes	%	±%
Independent	David Evans	Unopposed		
Independent hold		Swing		

=== St Clears (one seat) ===
St Clears 1898
Party	Candidate	Votes	%	±%
Independent	Philip Thomas	114		
Independent	Thomas Beynon	55		
Independent hold		Swing		

=== St Ishmaels (one seat) ===
St Ishmaels 1898
Party	Candidate	Votes	%	±%
Independent	Elizabeth Mary Gwyn*	Unopposed		
Independent hold		Swing		

=== Trelech a'r Betws (two seats) ===
Trelech a'r Betws 1898
Party	Candidate	Votes	%	±%
Independent	Theophilus Howells	Unopposed		
Independent	J. Sylvanus Williams	Unopposed		
Independent hold		Swing		
Independent hold		Swing		

== Carmarthen Board of Guardians ==
All members of the District Council also served as members of Carmarthen Board of Guardians. In addition six members were elected to represent the borough of Carmarthen. In 1898 all the sitting members were returned unopposed.

=== Carmarthen (six seats) ===
Carmarthen 1898
Party	Candidate	Votes	%	±%
Independent	Edith Mary Hancocke	Unopposed		
Independent	Jonah Davies	Unopposed		
Independent	Jonathan Phillips	Unopposed		
Independent	Isobel Gertrude Anne Thomas	Unopposed		
Independent	William Thomas	Unopposed		
Independent	Thomas Thomas	Unopposed		
Independent hold		Swing		
Independent hold		Swing		
Independent hold		Swing		
Independent hold		Swing		
Independent hold		Swing		
Independent hold		Swing		
