= 1901 Carmarthen Rural District Council election =

Welsh local election

The third election to the Carmarthen Rural District Council was held in March 1901. It was preceded by the 1898 election and followed by the 1904 election. The successful candidates were also elected to the Carmarthen Board of Guardians.

There were a number of unopposed returns in the rural parishes. All the contests were non-political.

== Ward results ==
=== Abergwili (two seats) ===
Abergwili 1901
Party	Candidate	Votes	%	±%
Independent	John George Davies	Unopposed		
Independent	John Griffiths*	Unopposed		
Independent hold		Swing		
Independent hold		Swing		

=== Abernant (one seat) ===
Abernant 1901
Party	Candidate	Votes	%	±%
Independent	Thomas Pugh*	Unopposed		
Independent hold		Swing		

=== Conwil (two seats) ===
Conwil 1901
Party	Candidate	Votes	%	±%
Independent	Thomas Phillips	124		
Independent	William Edmonds	114		
Independent	David Thomas*	108		
Independent	John Davies	74		
Independent hold		Swing		
Independent hold		Swing		

=== Laugharne Parish (one seat) ===
Laugharne Parish 1901
Party	Candidate	Votes	%	±%
Independent	John Rees John*	Unopposed		
Independent hold		Swing		

=== Laugharne Township (one seat) ===
Laugharne Township 1901
Party	Candidate	Votes	%	±%
Independent	William Thomas*	Unopposed		
Independent hold		Swing		

=== Llanarthney (two seats) ===
Llanarthney 1901
Party	Candidate	Votes	%	±%
Independent	Stephen Stephens*	Unopposed		
Independent	William J. Thomas*	Unopposed		
Independent hold		Swing		
Independent hold		Swing		

=== Llandawke and Llansadurnen (one seat) ===
Llandawke and Llansadurnen 1901
Party	Candidate	Votes	%	±%
Independent	William S. Morse*	Unopposed		
Independent hold		Swing		

=== Llanddarog (one seat) ===
Llanddarog 1901
Party	Candidate	Votes	%	±%
Independent	John Davies*	Unopposed		
Independent hold		Swing		

=== Llandeilo Abercowyn and Llangynog (one seat) ===
Llandeilo Abercowyn and Llangynog 1901
Party	Candidate	Votes	%	±%
Independent	Joseph Jones	Unopposed		
Independent hold		Swing		

=== Llanddowror (one seat) ===
Llanddowror 1901
Party	Candidate	Votes	%	±%
Independent	Rev Thomas Jones*	Unopposed		
Independent hold		Swing		

=== Llandyfaelog (one seat) ===
Llandyfaelog 1901
Party	Candidate	Votes	%	±%
Independent	Thomas Rees*	Unopposed		
Independent hold		Swing		

=== Llanfihangel Abercowin (one seat) ===
Llanfihangel Abercowin 1901
Party	Candidate	Votes	%	±%
Independent	David Thomas*	Unopposed		
Independent hold		Swing		

=== Llangain (one seat) ===
Llangain 1901
Party	Candidate	Votes	%	±%
Independent	William Williams*	37		
Independent	David Thomas	23		
Independent hold		Swing		

=== Llangunnor (one seat) ===
Abernant 1901
Party	Candidate	Votes	%	±%
Independent	Herbert Griffiths*	Unopposed		
Independent hold		Swing		

=== Llanllawddog (one seat) ===
Llanllawddog 1901
Party	Candidate	Votes	%	±%
Independent	Winsor Lloyd Thomas	Unopposed		
Independent hold		Swing		

=== Llanpumsaint (one seat) ===
Llanpumsaint 1901
Party	Candidate	Votes	%	±%
Independent	Thomas Evans	86		
Independent	Thomas Davies	53		
Independent hold		Swing		

=== Llanstephan (one seat) ===
Llanstephan 1901
Party	Candidate	Votes	%	±%
Independent	Griffith Barrett Evans*	Unopposed		
Independent hold		Swing		

=== Llanwinio (one seat) ===
Llanwinio 1901
Party	Candidate	Votes	%	±%
Independent	John Phillips*	Unopposed		
Independent hold		Swing		

=== Merthyr (one seat) ===
Merthyr 1901
Party	Candidate	Votes	%	±%
Independent	David Evans*	Unopposed		
Independent hold		Swing		

=== Mydrim (one seat) ===
Mydrim 1901
Party	Candidate	Votes	%	±%
Independent	John Davies	Unopposed		
Independent hold		Swing		

=== Newchurch (one seat) ===
Newchurch 1901
Party	Candidate	Votes	%	±%
Independent	D.E. Stephens*	115		
Independent	David Edwards	22		
Independent hold		Swing		

=== St Clears (one seat) ===
St Clears 1901
Party	Candidate	Votes	%	±%
Independent	Joseph Morris	82		
Independent	David Evans	54		
Independent	John Jones	54		
Independent win (new seat)				

=== St Ishmaels (one seat) ===
St Ishmaels 1901
Party	Candidate	Votes	%	±%
Independent	Elizabeth Mary Gwyn*	138		
Independent	William Thomas	102		
Independent hold		Swing		

=== Trelech a'r Betws (two seats) ===
Trelech a'r Betws 1901
Party	Candidate	Votes	%	±%
Independent	Rev William Henry Jones	Unopposed		
Independent	William Thomas	Unopposed		
Independent hold		Swing		
Independent hold		Swing		

== Carmarthen Board of Guardians ==
All members of the District Council also served as members of Carmarthen Board of Guardians. In addition six members were elected to represent the borough of Carmarthen. As in 1898 all the sitting members were returned unopposed.

=== Carmarthen (six seats) ===
Carmarthen 1901
Party	Candidate	Votes	%	±%
Independent	Edith Mary Hancocke*	Unopposed		
Independent	Rev A. Fuller-Mills*	Unopposed		
Independent	Jonathan Phillips*	Unopposed		
Independent	Isobel Gertrude Anne Thomas*	Unopposed		
Independent	J.P. Lewis*	Unopposed		
Independent	Thomas Thomas*	Unopposed		
Independent hold		Swing		
Independent hold		Swing		
Independent hold		Swing		
Independent hold		Swing		
Independent hold		Swing		
Independent hold		Swing		
