= 1904 Carmarthen Rural District Council election =

Welsh local election

The fourth election to the Carmarthen Rural District Council was held in March 1904. It was preceded by the 1901 election and followed by the 1907 election. The successful candidates were also elected to the Carmarthen Board of Guardians.

There were a number of unopposed returns in the rural parishes.

== Ward results ==
=== Abergwili (two seats) ===
Abergwili 1904
Party	Candidate	Votes	%	±%
Independent	John George Davies*	Unopposed		
Independent	Benjamin Jeremy	Unopposed		
Independent hold		Swing		
Independent hold		Swing		

=== Abernant (one seat) ===
Abernant 1904
Party	Candidate	Votes	%	±%
Independent	Thomas Pugh*	Unopposed		
Independent hold		Swing		

=== Conwil (two seats) ===
Conwil 1904
Party	Candidate	Votes	%	±%
Independent	Thomas Phillips	106		
Independent	David Thomas*	100		
Independent	John Davies	84		
Independent	Benjamin Phillips	84		
Independent hold		Swing		
Independent hold		Swing		

=== Laugharne Parish (one seat) ===
Laugharne Parish 1904
Party	Candidate	Votes	%	±%
Independent	John Bedford	Unopposed		
Independent hold		Swing		

=== Laugharne Township (one seat) ===
Laugharne Township 1904
Party	Candidate	Votes	%	±%
Independent	Benjamin R. Thomas	115		
Independent	W.H. Dempster	79		
Independent hold		Swing		

=== Llanarthney (two seats) ===
Llanarthney 1904
Party	Candidate	Votes	%	±%
Independent	Stephen Stephens*	Unopposed		
Independent	William J. Thomas*	Unopposed		
Independent hold		Swing		
Independent hold		Swing		

=== Llandawke and Llansadurnen (one seat) ===
Llandawke and Llansadurnen 1904
Party	Candidate	Votes	%	±%
Independent	William S. Morse*	Unopposed		
Independent hold		Swing		

=== Llanddarog (one seat) ===
Llanddarog 1904
Party	Candidate	Votes	%	±%
Independent	John Davies*	Unopposed		
Independent hold		Swing		

=== Llandeilo Abercowyn and Llangynog (one seat) ===
Llandeilo Abercowyn and Llangynog 1904
Party	Candidate	Votes	%	±%
Independent	Evan Davies	68		
Independent	Joseph Jones*	39		
Independent hold		Swing		

=== Llanddowror (one seat) ===
Llanddowror 1904
Party	Candidate	Votes	%	±%
Independent	Benjamin Thomas	34		
Independent	Joseph Thomas	12		
Independent hold		Swing		

=== Llandyfaelog (one seat) ===
Llandyfaelog 1904
Party	Candidate	Votes	%	±%
Independent	John Bowen	Unopposed		
Independent hold		Swing		

=== Llanfihangel Abercowin (one seat) ===
David Thomas, the member since 1894, submitted a nomination but then withdrew.

Llanfihangel Abercowin 1904
Party	Candidate	Votes	%	±%
Independent	T. Howells	Unopposed		
Independent hold		Swing		

=== Llangain (one seat) ===
Llangain 1904
Party	Candidate	Votes	%	±%
Independent	William Williams*	Unopposed		
Independent hold		Swing		

=== Llangendeirne (two seats) ===
Llangendeirne 1904
Party	Candidate	Votes	%	±%
Independent	John Lewis	131		
Independent	Herbert Howells*	130		
Independent	David Thomas	111		
Independent	John Williams	94		
Independent hold		Swing		
Independent hold		Swing		

=== Llangunnor (one seat) ===
Llangunnor 1904
Party	Candidate	Votes	%	±%
Independent	J. Rees	Unopposed		
Independent hold		Swing		

=== Llangynin (one seat) ===
Llangynin 1904
Party	Candidate	Votes	%	±%
Independent	J.T. Williams*	Unopposed		
Independent hold		Swing		

=== Llanllawddog (one seat) ===
Llanllawddog 1904
Party	Candidate	Votes	%	±%
Independent	H.L. James	Unopposed		
Independent hold		Swing		

=== Llanpumsaint (one seat) ===
Llanpumsaint 1904
Party	Candidate	Votes	%	±%
Independent	J. Bowen	Unopposed		
Independent hold		Swing		

=== Llanstephan (one seat) ===
Llanstephan 1904
Party	Candidate	Votes	%	±%
Independent	Thomas Davies	134		
Independent	Robert Phillips	73		
Independent hold		Swing		

=== Llanwinio (one seat) ===
Llanwinio 1904
Party	Candidate	Votes	%	±%
Independent	John Phillips*	Unopposed		
Independent hold		Swing		

=== Merthyr (one seat) ===
Merthyr 1904
Party	Candidate	Votes	%	±%
Independent	J.B.P. Thomas	Unopposed		
Independent hold		Swing		

=== Mydrim (one seat) ===
Mydrim 1904
Party	Candidate	Votes	%	±%
Independent	W.H. Thomas	Unopposed		
Independent hold		Swing		

=== Newchurch (one seat) ===
Newchurch 1904
Party	Candidate	Votes	%	±%
Independent	J. Edwards	Unopposed		
Independent hold		Swing		

=== St Clears (one seat) ===
St Clears 1904
Party	Candidate	Votes	%	±%
Independent	David John	106		
Independent	Joseph Morris*	69		
Independent hold		Swing		

=== St Ishmaels (one seat) ===
St Ishmaels 1904
Party	Candidate	Votes	%	±%
Independent	George E. Bowen	189		
Independent	Richard M. Bright	30		
Independent	David A.W. Daniel	18		
Independent hold		Swing		

=== Trelech a'r Betws (two seats) ===
The vicar of Trelech, Rev William Henry Jones, a member of the previous council, submitted a nomination but withdrew.

Trelech a'r Betws 1904
Party	Candidate	Votes	%	±%
Independent	T. Howells	Unopposed		
Independent	J. Sylvanus Williams	Unopposed		
Independent hold		Swing		
Independent hold		Swing		

== Carmarthen Board of Guardians ==
All members of the District Council also served as members of Carmarthen Board of Guardians. In addition six members were elected to represent the borough of Carmarthen.

For the first time since 1894 there was a contested election and although the election was fought on denominational rather than party political lines, the two church candidates were also supported by the Conservative Association. At the recent county council election there had been a close contest between Fuller-Mills and David Davies.

=== Carmarthen (six seats) ===
Carmarthen 1904
Party	Candidate	Votes	%	±%
Independent	Jonathan Phillips	1,162		
Independent	Georgina M.E. White	986		
Independent	J. Patagonia Lewis*	843		
Independent	J.T. Lewis	737		
Independent	Andrew Fuller-Mills*	718		
Independent	D. Davies	710		
Independent	Mrs M.A. Blagdon Richards	698		
Independent	Mrs Thomas Thomas	655		
Independent	Mrs Annie Evans	570		
Independent	Thomas Thomas*	551		
Independent hold		Swing		
Independent hold		Swing		
Independent hold		Swing		
Independent hold		Swing		
Independent hold		Swing		
Independent hold		Swing		
