= 1931 Carmarthen Rural District Council election =

1931 Welsh local government election

An election to the Carmarthen Rural District Council in Wales was held in April 1931. It was preceded by the 1928 election and was followed by the 1934 election. A large number of candidates had been returned unopposed with only seven wards being contested. Initially, no nominations were received for the Llandawke and Llansadurnen ward, nor the Llanddowror ward.

== Boundary changes ==
There were no boundary changes. The Board of Guardians, of which all members were previously also member of, had been abolished in 1930.

== Overview of the results ==
As had been the pattern in recent elections the vast majority of candidates were Independents and the majority were returned unopposed. Thomas Thomas, one of the few Labour members, had served as chairman of the council in 1930-31, but was defeated at Llanarthey having a few weeks earlier unsuccessfully stood for election to Carmarthenshire County Council.

== Ward results ==
=== Abergwili (two seats) ===
Abergwili 1931
| Party | Candidate | Votes | % | ±% |
|---|---|---|---|---|
| Independent | Thomas Duncan Dempster* | Unopposed | | |
| Independent | Evan Griffiths* | Unopposed | | |
| Independent hold | | Swing | | |
| Independent hold | | Swing | | |

=== Abernant (one seat) ===
Abernant 1931
| Party | Candidate | Votes | % | ±% |
|---|---|---|---|---|
| Independent | David Jones* | Unopposed | | |
| Independent hold | | Swing | | |

=== Conwil (two seats) ===
Conwil 1931
| Party | Candidate | Votes | % | ±% |
|---|---|---|---|---|
| Independent | John Walter Lloyd Harries* | 320 | | |
| Independent | John Jones Evans* | 293 | | |
| Independent | William H. Phillips | 269 | | |
| Independent hold | | Swing | | |
| Independent hold | | Swing | | |

=== Laugharne Parish (one seat) ===
Laugharne Parish 1931
| Party | Candidate | Votes | % | ±% |
|---|---|---|---|---|
| Independent | David James* | Unopposed | | |
| Independent hold | | Swing | | |

=== Laugharne Township (one seat) ===
Laugharne Township 1931
| Party | Candidate | Votes | % | ±% |
|---|---|---|---|---|
| Independent | Benjamin Edmunds* | 262 | | |
| Independent | John Evans Williams | 143 | | |
| Independent hold | | Swing | | |

=== Llanarthney North Ward (one seat) ===
Llanarthney North Ward 1931
| Party | Candidate | Votes | % | ±% |
|---|---|---|---|---|
| Independent | William Williams* | Unopposed | | |
| Independent hold | | Swing | | |

=== Llanarthney South Ward (two seats) ===
Llanarthney South Ward 1931
| Party | Candidate | Votes | % | ±% |
|---|---|---|---|---|
| Independent | John Lewis | 633 | | |
| Independent | William Brazell* | 566 | | |
| Labour | Thomas Thomas* | 563 | | |
| Labour | David Morgan Davies | 350 | | |
| Independent gain from Labour | | Swing | | |
| Independent hold | | Swing | | |

=== Llandawke and Llansadurnen (one seat) ===
Llandawke and Llansadurnen 1928
| Party | Candidate | Votes | % | ±% |
|---|---|---|---|---|
| Independent | George Alfred Lewis* | Unopposed | | |
| Independent hold | | Swing | | |

=== Llanddarog (one seat) ===
Llanddarog 1931
| Party | Candidate | Votes | % | ±% |
|---|---|---|---|---|
| Independent | James William Lewis* | Unopposed | | |
| Independent hold | | Swing | | |

=== Llandeilo Abercowyn and Llangynog (one seat) ===
Llandeilo Abercowyn and Llangynog 1931
| Party | Candidate | Votes | % | ±% |
|---|---|---|---|---|
| Independent | Johnny Johns | Unopposed | | |
| Independent hold | | Swing | | |

=== Llanddowror (one seat) ===
Llanddowror 1928
| Party | Candidate | Votes | % | ±% |
|---|---|---|---|---|
| Independent | Thomas Henry David* | Unopposed | | |
| Independent hold | | Swing | | |

=== Llandyfaelog (one seat) ===
Llandyfaelog 1931
| Party | Candidate | Votes | % | ±% |
|---|---|---|---|---|
| Independent | Morris Davies* | Unopposed | | |
| Independent hold | | Swing | | |

=== Llanfihangel Abercowin (one seat) ===
Llanfihangel Abercowin 1931
| Party | Candidate | Votes | % | ±% |
|---|---|---|---|---|
| Independent | Joseph Thomas* | Unopposed | | |
| Independent hold | | Swing | | |

=== Llangain (one seat) ===
Llangain 1931
| Party | Candidate | Votes | % | ±% |
|---|---|---|---|---|
| Independent | John Lewis* | Unopposed | | |
| Independent hold | | Swing | | |

=== Llangendeirne (two seats) ===
Llangendeirne 1931
| Party | Candidate | Votes | % | ±% |
|---|---|---|---|---|
| Labour | Richard Williams* | 591 | | |
| Independent | William Thomas* | 495 | | |
| Independent | Thomas Lewis | 349 | | |
| Labour hold | | Swing | | |
| Independent hold | | Swing | | |

=== Llangunnor (one seat) ===
Llangunnor 1931
| Party | Candidate | Votes | % | ±% |
|---|---|---|---|---|
| Independent | David John Jones | 151 | | |
| Independent | Essex Morris | 149 | | |
| Independent | Henry Williams | 104 | | |
| Independent hold | | Swing | | |

=== Llangynin (one seat) ===
Llangynin 1931
| Party | Candidate | Votes | % | ±% |
|---|---|---|---|---|
| Independent | John Thomas Williams* | Unopposed | | |
| Independent hold | | Swing | | |

=== Llanllawddog (one seat) ===
Llanllawddog 1931
| Party | Candidate | Votes | % | ±% |
|---|---|---|---|---|
| Independent | George Dyer | Unopposed | | |
| Independent hold | | Swing | | |

=== Llanpumsaint (one seat) ===
Llanpumsaint 1931
| Party | Candidate | Votes | % | ±% |
|---|---|---|---|---|
| Independent | Samuel Evans | Unopposed | | |
| Independent hold | | Swing | | |

=== Llanstephan (one seat) ===
Llanstephan 1931
| Party | Candidate | Votes | % | ±% |
|---|---|---|---|---|
| Independent | John Llewelyn Richards* | 270 | | |
| Independent | Ambrose Myrddin Lloyd | 133 | | |
| Independent hold | | Swing | | |

=== Llanwinio (one seat) ===
Llanwinio 1931
| Party | Candidate | Votes | % | ±% |
|---|---|---|---|---|
| Independent | Daniel Thomas | Unopposed | | |
| Independent hold | | Swing | | |

=== Merthyr (one seat) ===
Merthyr 1931
| Party | Candidate | Votes | % | ±% |
|---|---|---|---|---|
| Independent | John Lloyd Thomas* | Unopposed | | |
| Independent hold | | Swing | | |

=== Mydrim (one seat) ===
Mydrim 1931
| Party | Candidate | Votes | % | ±% |
|---|---|---|---|---|
| Independent | Henry Daniel Jenkins* | Unopposed | | |
| Independent hold | | Swing | | |

=== Newchurch (one seat) ===
Newchurch 1931
| Party | Candidate | Votes | % | ±% |
|---|---|---|---|---|
| Independent | William Hughes* | Unopposed | | |
| Independent hold | | Swing | | |

=== St Clears (one seat) ===
St Clears 1931
| Party | Candidate | Votes | % | ±% |
|---|---|---|---|---|
| Independent | Theophilus John Morgan | Unopposed | | |
| Independent hold | | Swing | | |

=== St Ishmaels (two seats) ===
St Ishmaels 1931
| Party | Candidate | Votes | % | ±% |
|---|---|---|---|---|
| Independent | Evan Wilkins* | 331 | | |
| Independent | Thomas Harries* | 317 | | |
| Independent | Rev William Mydrim Davies | 278 | | |
| Independent hold | | Swing | | |
| Independent hold | | Swing | | |

=== Trelech a'r Betws (two seats) ===
Trelech a'r Betws 1931
| Party | Candidate | Votes | % | ±% |
|---|---|---|---|---|
| Independent | Simon Owen Thomas* | Unopposed | | |
| Independent | Henry Trevor Williams | Unopposed | | |
| Independent hold | | Swing | | |
| Independent hold | | Swing | | |
