= 1946 Carmarthen Rural District Council election =

1946 Welsh local government election

An election to the Carmarthen Rural District Council in Wales was held on 1 April 1946.

It was preceded by the 1937 election but, due to the Second World War, no further elections had taken place in 1940 or 1943. It was followed by the 1949 election.

== Boundary changes ==
There were no boundary changes at this election.

== Candidates ==
The election was largely fought on a non-political basis. Sixteen candidates were returned unopposed; all of whom were Independent candidates apart from Gwilym Rees (Lab, Llanddarog). The only other Labour candidates were successful at Llanarthney and Llangyndeyrn.

Two retiring members, S.O. Thomas (Trelech) and W.H. Phillips (Cynwyl Elfed) did not seek re-election havong recently won seats on Carmarthenshire County Council.

== Outcome ==
There were no significant changes, and most attention focused on the defeat of the outgoing chairman, Ambrose Lloyd, at Llansteffan, and a few close contests in other wards.

== Ward results ==
=== Abergwili (one seat) ===
Abergwili 1946
Party	Candidate	Votes	%	±%
Independent	Thomas Duncan Dempster*	Unopposed		
Independent hold		Swing		

=== Abernant (one seat) ===
Abernant 1946
Party	Candidate	Votes	%	±%
Independent	David Richard Williams*	Unopposed		
Independent hold		Swing		

=== Cilymaenllwyd (one seat) ===
Cilymaenllwyd 1946
Party	Candidate	Votes	%	±%
Independent	David Garrick Protheroe*	Unopposed		
Independent hold		Swing		

=== Conwil (one seat) ===
Conwil 1937
Party	Candidate	Votes	%	±%
Independent	Hery Howell Davies	309		
Independent	William George Davies	308		
Independent hold		Swing		

=== Eglwyscummin (one seat) ===
Eglwyscummin 1946
Party	Candidate	Votes	%	±%
Independent	George Llewellyn*	Unopposed		
Independent hold		Swing		

=== Henllanfallteg (one seat) ===
Henllanfallteg 1946
Party	Candidate	Votes	%	±%
Independent	William Llewelyn Morris	Unopposed		
Independent hold		Swing		

=== Laugharne Township (one seat) ===
Laugharne Township 1946
Party	Candidate	Votes	%	±%
Independent	Robert Henry Tyler*	Unopposed		
Independent hold		Swing		

=== Llanarthney North Ward (one seat) ===
Llanarthney North Ward 1946
Party	Candidate	Votes	%	±%
Independent	Thomas Jones	206		
Independent	William Edgar Thomas	148		
Independent	John Davies	88		
Independent hold		Swing		

=== Llanarthney South Ward (two seats) ===
Llanarthney South Ward 1946
Party	Candidate	Votes	%	±%
Labour	David Morgan Davies*	1,187		
Labour	Henry Thomas	865		
Independent	L.J. Griffiths	632		
Independent	Rees Vaughan	365		
Labour hold		Swing		
Labour hold		Swing		

=== Llanboidy Ward No. 1 (one seat) ===
Llanboidy Ward No. 1 1946
Party	Candidate	Votes	%	±%
Independent	John Ivor Davies*	Unopposed		
Independent hold		Swing		

=== Llanboidy Ward No. 2 (one seat) ===
Llanboidy Ward No. 2 1946
Party	Candidate	Votes	%	±%
Independent	John Jones*	Unopposed		
Independent hold		Swing		

=== Llandissilio East (one seat) ===
Llandissilio East 1946
Party	Candidate	Votes	%	±%
Independent	David Griffiths*	Unopposed		
Independent hold		Swing		

=== Llanddarog (one seat) ===
Llanddarog 1946
Party	Candidate	Votes	%	±%
Labour	Gwilym Rees	Unopposed		
Labour hold		Swing		

=== Llanddowror (two seats) ===
Llanddowror 1946
Party	Candidate	Votes	%	±%
Independent	Henry Rhys Jones*	210		
Independent	D.C. Rogers	196		
Independent	William Lewis	112		
Independent hold		Swing		
Independent hold		Swing		

=== Llandyfaelog (one seat) ===
Llandyfaelog 1946
Party	Candidate	Votes	%	±%
Independent	William Anthony*	303		
Independent	William Evans	210		
Independent hold		Swing		

=== Llanfihangel Abercowin (one seat) ===
Llanfihangel Abercowin 1946
Party	Candidate	Votes	%	±%
Independent	O.J. Williams	328		
Independent	David Williams*	244		
Independent hold		Swing		

=== Llangain (one seat) ===
Llangain 1946
Party	Candidate	Votes	%	±%
Independent	John Lewis*	Unopposed		
Independent hold		Swing		

=== Llangendeirne (two seats) ===
Llangendeirne 1946
Party	Candidate	Votes	%	±%
Labour	John Jones*	811		
Independent	William Thomas*	495		
Independent	T.T. Williams	712		
Labour hold		Swing		
Independent hold		Swing		

=== Llangunnor (one seat) ===
Llangunnor 1946
Party	Candidate	Votes	%	±%
Independent	David Thomas	Unopposed		
Independent hold		Swing		

=== Llangynin (one seat) ===
Llangynin 1946
Party	Candidate	Votes	%	±%
Independent	Stephen Davies*	Unopposed		
Independent hold		Swing		

=== Llangynog (one seat) ===
Llangynog 1946
Party	Candidate	Votes	%	±%
Independent	Isaac Evans*	176		
Independent	D.J. Evans	95		
Independent	I.J. Williams	61		
Independent hold		Swing		

=== Llanllawddog (one seat) ===
Llanllawddog 1946
Party	Candidate	Votes	%	±%
Independent	George Dyer*	Unopposed		
Independent hold		Swing		

=== Llanpumsaint (one seat) ===
Llanpumsaint 1946
Party	Candidate	Votes	%	±%
Independent	David John Richards*	Unopposed		
Independent hold		Swing		

=== Llanstephan (one seat) ===
Llanstephan 1946
Party	Candidate	Votes	%	±%
Independent	J.H. Davies	Unopposed		
Independent	Ambrose Myrddin Lloyd*	285		
Independent hold		Swing		

=== Mydrim (one seat) ===
Mydrim 1946
Party	Candidate	Votes	%	±%
Independent	Henry Daniel Jenkins*	Unopposed		
Independent	Harold Griffith Jones	165		
Independent hold		Swing		

=== Newchurch (one seat) ===
Newchurch 1946
Party	Candidate	Votes	%	±%
Independent	David Jones*	Unopposed		
Independent	Thomas J. Jones	257		
Independent hold		Swing		

=== Pendine (one seat) ===
Pendine 1946
Party	Candidate	Votes	%	±%
Independent	Tom Pomeroy*	Unopposed		
Independent hold		Swing		

=== St Clears (one seat) ===
St Clears 1946
Party	Candidate	Votes	%	±%
Independent	David Theophilus Davies*	Unopposed		
Independent hold		Swing		

=== St Ishmaels (one seat) ===
St Ishmaels 1946
Party	Candidate	Votes	%	±%
Independent	C.J. Burgess	Unopposed		
Independent	D.M. Thomas	261		
Independent hold		Swing		

=== Trelech a'r Betws (one seat) ===
Trelech a'r Betws 1946
Party	Candidate	Votes	%	±%
Independent	S. Jenkins	Unopposed		
Independent	D.J. Evans	191		
Independent	Edwin Williams	69		
Independent hold		Swing		

=== Whitland (two seats) ===
Whitland 1937
Party	Candidate	Votes	%	±%
Independent	Rev W.J. Bowen*	618		
Independent	William Sandbrook Cole*	433		
Independent	H.R. Morgan	230		
Independent hold		Swing		
Independent hold		Swing		
