= 1949 Carmarthen Rural District Council election =

Welsh district council election

An election to the Carmarthen Rural District Council in Wales was held on 10 May 1949. It was preceded by the 1946 election and followed by the 1952 election.

== Boundary changes ==
There were no boundary changes at this election.

== Candidates ==
The election was largely fought on a non-political basis. Seventeen candidates were returned unopposed, which was one more than three years previously. As was the case in 1946, the unopposed candidates were all Independents, apart from Gwilym Rees (Lab, Llanddarog), chairman-elect of the council. Labour candidates were successful at Llanarthney South but lost one seat at Llangyndeyrn to an Independent Labour candidate.

== Outcome ==
There were no significant changes, though Labour gained a seat at Whitland.

== Ward results ==
=== Abergwili (one seat) ===
Abergwili 1949
Party	Candidate	Votes	%	±%
Independent	Thomas Duncan Dempster*	Unopposed		
Independent hold		Swing		

=== Abernant (one seat) ===
Abernant 1949
Party	Candidate	Votes	%	±%
Independent	David Richard Williams*	183		
Independent	P.S. Richards	114		
Independent hold		Swing		

=== Cilymaenllwyd (one seat) ===
Cilymaenllwyd 1949
Party	Candidate	Votes	%	±%
Independent	David Garrick Protheroe*	Unopposed		
Independent hold		Swing		

=== Conwil (one seat) ===
Conwil 1949
Party	Candidate	Votes	%	±%
Independent	Henry Howell Davies*	Unopposed		
Independent hold		Swing		

=== Eglwyscummin (one seat) ===
Eglwyscummin 1949
Party	Candidate	Votes	%	±%
Independent	George Llewellyn*	Unopposed		
Independent hold		Swing		

=== Henllanfallteg (one seat) ===
Henllanfallteg 1949
Party	Candidate	Votes	%	±%
Independent	William Llewelyn Morris*	Unopposed		
Independent hold		Swing		

=== Laugharne Township (one seat) ===
Laugharne Township 1949
Party	Candidate	Votes	%	±%
Independent	Robert Henry Tyler*	Unopposed		
Independent hold		Swing		

=== Llanarthney North Ward (one seat) ===
Llanarthney North Ward 1949
Party	Candidate	Votes	%	±%
Independent	Thomas Jones*	241		
Labour	William Edgar Thomas	194		
Independent hold		Swing		

=== Llanarthney South Ward (two seats) ===
Llanarthney South Ward 1949
Party	Candidate	Votes	%	±%
Labour	David Morgan Davies*	1,235		
Labour	Henry Thomas*	1,007		
Independent	Gwilym Jones	732		
Labour hold		Swing		
Labour hold		Swing		

=== Llanboidy Ward No. 1 (one seat) ===
Llanboidy Ward No. 1 1949
Party	Candidate	Votes	%	±%
Independent	John Ivor Davies*	Unopposed		
Independent hold		Swing		

=== Llanboidy Ward No. 2 (one seat) ===
Llanboidy Ward No. 2 1949
Party	Candidate	Votes	%	±%
Independent	D.J. Davies*	Unopposed		
Independent hold		Swing		

=== Llandissilio East (one seat) ===
Llandissilio East 1949
Party	Candidate	Votes	%	±%
Independent	David Griffiths*	Unopposed		
Independent hold		Swing		

=== Llanddarog (one seat) ===
Llanddarog 1949
Party	Candidate	Votes	%	±%
Labour	Gwilym Rees	Unopposed		
Labour hold		Swing		

=== Llanddowror (two seats) ===
Llanddowror 1946
Party	Candidate	Votes	%	±%
Independent	D.C. Rogers*	245		
Independent	Henry Rhys Jones*	205		
Independent	William Lewis	161		
Independent hold		Swing		
Independent hold		Swing		

=== Llandyfaelog (one seat) ===
Llandyfaelog 1949
Party	Candidate	Votes	%	±%
Independent	William Anthony*	Unopposed		
Independent hold		Swing		

=== Llanfihangel Abercowin (one seat) ===
Llanfihangel Abercowin 1949
Party	Candidate	Votes	%	±%
Independent	O.J. Williams	382		
Independent	T.O. Jones	114		
Independent	David Davies	108		
Independent hold		Swing		

=== Llangain (one seat) ===
Llangain 1949
Party	Candidate	Votes	%	±%
Independent	A.V. Key*	Unopposed		
Independent hold		Swing		

=== Llangendeirne (two seats) ===
Llangendeirne 1949
Party	Candidate	Votes	%	±%
Labour	John Jones*	811		
Independent	William Thomas*			
Independent	T.T. Williams	712		
Labour hold		Swing		
Independent hold		Swing		

=== Llangunnor (one seat) ===
Llangunnor 1949
Party	Candidate	Votes	%	±%
Independent	David Thomas*	403		
Labour	A.J. Bowen	205		
Independent hold		Swing		

=== Llangynin (one seat) ===
Llangynin 1949
Party	Candidate	Votes	%	±%
Independent	Stephen Davies*	Unopposed		
Independent hold		Swing		

=== Llangynog (one seat) ===
Llangynog 1946
Party	Candidate	Votes	%	±%
Independent	I.J. Williams	160		
Independent	D.J. Evans	140		
Independent hold		Swing		

=== Llanllawddog (one seat) ===
No nominations received

=== Llanpumsaint (one seat) ===
Llanpumsaint 1949
Party	Candidate	Votes	%	±%
Independent	David John Richards*	Unopposed		
Independent hold		Swing		

=== Llanstephan (one seat) ===
Llanstephan 1949
Party	Candidate	Votes	%	±%
Independent	J.H. Davies*	Unopposed		
Independent hold		Swing		

=== Mydrim (one seat) ===
Mydrim 1949
Party	Candidate	Votes	%	±%
Independent	Henry Daniel Jenkins*	Unopposed		
Independent hold		Swing		

=== Newchurch (one seat) ===
Newchurch 1949
Party	Candidate	Votes	%	±%
Independent	David Jones*	Unopposed		
Independent	D.P. Evans	205		
Independent hold		Swing		

=== Pendine (one seat) ===
Pendine 1949
Party	Candidate	Votes	%	±%
Independent	Tom Pomeroy*	87		
Independent	Rev J.R. Williams	80		
Independent hold		Swing		

=== St Clears (one seat) ===
St Clears 1949
Party	Candidate	Votes	%	±%
Independent	David Theophilus Davies*	Unopposed		
Independent hold		Swing		

=== St Ishmaels (one seat) ===
St Ishmaels 1949
Party	Candidate	Votes	%	±%
Labour	C.J. Burgess	506		
Independent	T.A. Davies	253		
Labour gain from Independent		Swing		

=== Trelech a'r Betws (one seat) ===
Trelech a'r Betws 1949
Party	Candidate	Votes	%	±%
Independent	Samuel Jenkins	Unopposed		
Independent hold		Swing		

=== Whitland (two seats) ===
Whitland 1949
Party	Candidate	Votes	%	±%
Independent	William Sandbrook Cole*	470		
Labour	W.D. Cunnick	426		
Independent	W.S. Richards	375		
Independent	H.R. Morgan	87		
Independent hold		Swing		
Labour gain from Independent		Swing		
