= 1907 Carmarthen Rural District Council election =

Welsh local election

An election to the Carmarthen Rural District Council was held in March 1907. It was preceded by the 1904 election and followed by the 1910 election. The successful candidates were also elected to the Carmarthen Board of Guardians. Around half the members were returned unopposed.

== Ward results ==
=== Abergwili (two seats) ===
Abergwili 1907
Party	Candidate	Votes	%	±%
Independent	John Williams	163		
Independent	Benjamin Jeremy*	147		
Independent	Israel Evans	106		
Independent	David Davies	88		
Independent hold		Swing		
Independent hold		Swing		

=== Abernant (one seat) ===
Abernant 1907
Party	Candidate	Votes	%	±%
Independent	David Williams	73		
Independent	David Davies	38		
Independent hold		Swing		

=== Conwil (two seats) ===
Conwil 1907
Party	Candidate	Votes	%	±%
Independent	Benjamin Phillips	155		
Independent	John Davies	143		
Independent	David Thomas*	82		
Independent hold		Swing		
Independent hold		Swing		

=== Laugharne Parish (one seat) ===
Laugharne Parish 1907
Party	Candidate	Votes	%	±%
Independent	John Bedford*	Unopposed		
Independent hold		Swing		

=== Laugharne Township (one seat) ===
Laugharne Township 1907
Party	Candidate	Votes	%	±%
Independent	Benjamin R. Thomas*	Unopposed		
Independent hold		Swing		

=== Llanarthney (two seats) ===
Stephen Stephens, a member of the Council since its formation, was defeated.

Llanarthney 1907
Party	Candidate	Votes	%	±%
Independent	William J. Thomas*	330		
Independent	W. Brazell	182		
Independent	Stephen Stephens*	139		
Independent hold		Swing		
Independent hold		Swing		

=== Llandawke and Llansadurnen (one seat) ===
Llandawke and Llansadurnen 1907
Party	Candidate	Votes	%	±%
Independent	W.R. Rees	22		
Independent	J.H. Thomas	19		
Independent hold		Swing		

=== Llanddarog (one seat) ===
Llanddarog 1907
Party	Candidate	Votes	%	±%
Independent	John Davies*	Unopposed		
Independent hold		Swing		

=== Llandeilo Abercowyn and Llangynog (one seat) ===
Llandeilo Abercowyn and Llangynog 1907
Party	Candidate	Votes	%	±%
Independent	Evan Davies*	68		
Independent	W. Weeks	62		
Independent hold		Swing		

=== Llanddowror (one seat) ===
No candidate was nominated therefore the sitting member, Benjamin Thomas, was deemed to be re-elected.

Llanddowror 1907
Party	Candidate	Votes	%	±%
Independent	Benjamin Thomas*	Unopposed		
Independent hold		Swing		

=== Llandyfaelog (one seat) ===
Llandyfaelog 1907
Party	Candidate	Votes	%	±%
Independent	John Bowen*	Unopposed		
Independent hold		Swing		

=== Llanfihangel Abercowin (one seat) ===
Llanfihangel Abercowin 1907
Party	Candidate	Votes	%	±%
Independent	Evan Williams	Unopposed		
Independent hold		Swing		

=== Llangain (one seat) ===
Llangain 1907
Party	Candidate	Votes	%	±%
Independent	James Jones	Unopposed		
Independent hold		Swing		

=== Llangendeirne (two seats) ===
Llangendeirne 1907
Party	Candidate	Votes	%	±%
Independent	D.T. Gilbert	Unopposed		
Independent	John Lewis*	Unopposed		
Independent hold		Swing		
Independent hold		Swing		

=== Llangunnor (one seat) ===
Llangunnor 1910
Party	Candidate	Votes	%	±%
Independent	David Phillips*	Unopposed		
Independent hold		Swing		

=== Llangynin (one seat) ===
Llangynin 1907
Party	Candidate	Votes	%	±%
Independent	J.T. Williams*	Unopposed		
Independent hold		Swing		

=== Llanllawddog (one seat) ===
Llanllawddog 1907
Party	Candidate	Votes	%	±%
Independent	Pryse Lloyd	64		
Independent	Daniel Davies	49		
Independent hold		Swing		

=== Llanpumsaint (one seat) ===
Llanpumsaint 1907
Party	Candidate	Votes	%	±%
Independent	Griffith Morris	92		
Independent	David Thomas	67		
Independent hold		Swing		

=== Llanstephan (one seat) ===
Llanstephan 1907
Party	Candidate	Votes	%	±%
Independent	John Francis	150		
Independent	Thomas Davies*	71		
Independent hold		Swing		

=== Llanwinio (one seat) ===
Llanwinio 1907
Party	Candidate	Votes	%	±%
Independent	John Phillips*	Unopposed		
Independent hold		Swing		

=== Merthyr (one seat) ===
Merthyr 1907
Party	Candidate	Votes	%	±%
Independent	Thomas Davies	Unopposed		
Independent hold		Swing		

=== Mydrim (one seat) ===
Mydrim 1907
Party	Candidate	Votes	%	±%
Independent	W.H. Thomas*	Unopposed		
Independent hold		Swing		

=== Newchurch (one seat) ===
Newchurch 1907
Party	Candidate	Votes	%	±%
Independent	David Evans	Unopposed		
Independent hold		Swing		

=== St Clears (one seat) ===
St Clears 1907
Party	Candidate	Votes	%	±%
Independent	David John*	110		
Independent	Thomas Thomas Lloyd	95		
Independent hold		Swing		

=== St Ishmaels (one seat) ===
St Ishmaels 1907
Party	Candidate	Votes	%	±%
Independent	John Jones	190		
Independent	Owen Davies	78		
Independent hold		Swing		

=== Trelech a'r Betws (two seats) ===
Trelech a'r Betws 1907
Party	Candidate	Votes	%	±%
Independent	D.G. Bowen	Unopposed		
Independent	J. Sylvanus Williams*	Unopposed		
Independent hold		Swing		
Independent hold		Swing		

== Carmarthen Board of Guardians ==
All members of the District Council also served as members of Carmarthen Board of Guardians. In addition six members were elected to represent the borough of Carmarthen.

There was a contested election which saw the five retiring members re-elected.

=== Carmarthen (six seats) ===
Carmarthen 1904
Party	Candidate	Votes	%	±%
Independent	Jonathan Phillips*	1,331		
Independent	Georgina M.E. White*	1,183		
Independent	Andrew Fuller-Mills*	1,135		
Independent	J. Patagonia Lewis*	1,056		
Independent	J.T. Lewis*	1,056		
Independent	E.A Rogers	677		
Independent	David Davies	462		
Independent hold		Swing		
Independent hold		Swing		
Independent hold		Swing		
Independent hold		Swing		
Independent hold		Swing		
Independent hold		Swing		
