= 1913 Carmarthen Rural District Council election =

Welsh local election

An election to the Carmarthen Rural District Council in Wales was held in April 1913. It was preceded by the 1910 election and, due to the scheduled 1916 election being postponed due to the First World War, was followed by the 1919 election. The majority of members were returned unopposed. The successful candidates were also elected to the Carmarthen Board of Guardians.

== Ward results ==
=== Abergwili (two seats) ===
Abergwili 1910
Party	Candidate	Votes	%	±%
Independent	W. Williams	175		
Independent	John Williams	169		
Independent	D. Harries Davies	126		
Independent hold		Swing		
Independent hold		Swing		

=== Abernant (one seat) ===
Abernant 1913
Party	Candidate	Votes	%	±%
Independent	T. Davies*	Unopposed		
Independent hold		Swing		

=== Conwil (two seats) ===
Conwil 1913
Party	Candidate	Votes	%	±%
Independent	John Evans	166		
Independent	John Jones	123		
Independent	Benjamin Phillips*	102		
Independent	Thomas Griffiths	79		
Independent	John Thomas	22		
Independent hold		Swing		
Independent hold		Swing		

=== Laugharne Parish (one seat) ===
Laugharne Parish 1913
Party	Candidate	Votes	%	±%
Independent	James Lewis*	Unopposed		
Independent hold		Swing		

=== Laugharne Township (one seat) ===
Laugharne Township 1913
Party	Candidate	Votes	%	±%
Independent	John Jones	Unopposed		
Independent hold		Swing		

=== Llanarthney (two seats) ===
The two sitting members stood down and former William Brazell was returned in second place,

Llanarthney 1910
Party	Candidate	Votes	%	±%
Independent	David Stephens	267		
Independent	William Brazell	260		
Independent	Henry Davies		131	
Independent	John Jones	130		
Independent hold		Swing		
Independent hold		Swing		

=== Llandawke and Llansadurnen (one seat) ===
Llandawke and Llansadurnen 1913
Party	Candidate	Votes	%	±%
Independent	William Thomas	26		
Independent	W.R. Rees*	20		
Independent hold		Swing		

=== Llanddarog (one seat) ===
Llanddarog 1913
Party	Candidate	Votes	%	±%
Independent	James William Lewis*	138		
Independent	John Grugos Williams	95		
Independent hold		Swing		

=== Llandeilo Abercowyn and Llangynog (one seat) ===
Llandeilo Abercowyn and Llangynog 1913
Party	Candidate	Votes	%	±%
Independent	Johnny Bowen*	Unopposed		
Independent hold		Swing		

=== Llanddowror (one seat) ===
Llanddowror 1913
Party	Candidate	Votes	%	±%
Independent	Joseph Phillips	Unopposed		
Independent hold		Swing		

=== Llandyfaelog (one seat) ===
Llandyfaelog 1913
Party	Candidate	Votes	%	±%
Independent	Evan Bowen	108		
Independent	William Bowen	95		
Independent hold		Swing		

=== Llanfihangel Abercowin (one seat) ===
Llanfihangel Abercowin 1913
Party	Candidate	Votes	%	±%
Independent	M.W. Jenkins	Unopposed		
Independent hold		Swing		

=== Llangain (one seat) ===
Llangain 1913
Party	Candidate	Votes	%	±%
Independent	David Thomas	Unopposed		
Independent hold		Swing		

=== Llangendeirne (two seats) ===
Llangendeirne 1913
Party	Candidate	Votes	%	±%
Independent	D.T. Gilbert*	Unopposed		
Independent	John Lewis*	Unopposed		
Independent hold		Swing		
Independent hold		Swing		

=== Llangunnor (one seat) ===
Llangunnor 1913
Party	Candidate	Votes	%	±%
Independent	Herbert Griffiths*	Unopposed		
Independent hold		Swing		

=== Llangynin (one seat) ===
Llangynin 1913
Party	Candidate	Votes	%	±%
Independent	Llewellyn Morgan*	37		
Independent	William Phillips	34		
Independent hold		Swing		

=== Llanllawddog (one seat) ===
Llanllawddog 1910
Party	Candidate	Votes	%	±%
Independent	Rev John Herbert	87		
Independent	Windsor Lloyd Thomas	42		
Independent hold		Swing		

=== Llanpumsaint (one seat) ===
Llanpumsaint 1913
Party	Candidate	Votes	%	±%
Independent	Richard Howells	Unopposed		
Independent hold		Swing		

=== Llanstephan (one seat) ===
Llanstephan 1910
Party	Candidate	Votes	%	±%
Independent	John Francis*	Unopposed		
Independent hold		Swing		

=== Llanwinio (one seat) ===
Llanwinio 1910
Party	Candidate	Votes	%	±%
Independent	Richard Lewis	Unopposed		
Independent hold		Swing		

=== Merthyr (one seat) ===
Merthyr 1913
Party	Candidate	Votes	%	±%
Independent	Thomas Davies*	Unopposed		
Independent hold		Swing		

=== Mydrim (one seat) ===
Mydrim 1913
Party	Candidate	Votes	%	±%
Independent	Morris J. Evans*	Unopposed		
Independent hold		Swing		

=== Newchurch (one seat) ===
Newchurch 1913
Party	Candidate	Votes	%	±%
Independent	Richard Jeremy	Unopposed		
Independent hold		Swing		

=== St Clears (one seat) ===
St Clears 1910
Party	Candidate	Votes	%	±%
Independent	Benjamin Salmon	115		
Independent	William Charles Thomas	103		
Independent hold		Swing		

=== St Ishmaels (one seat) ===
St Ishmaels 1913
Party	Candidate	Votes	%	±%
Independent	John Jones*	Unopposed		
Independent hold		Swing		

=== Trelech a'r Betws (two seats) ===
Trelech a'r Betws 1913
Party	Candidate	Votes	%	±%
Independent	D.G. Bowen*	Unopposed		
Independent	J. Sylvanus Williams*	Unopposed		
Independent hold		Swing		
Independent hold		Swing		

== Carmarthen Board of Guardians ==
All members of the District Council also served as members of Carmarthen Board of Guardians. In addition six members were elected to represent the borough of Carmarthen. All six sitting members were returned unopposed.

=== Carmarthen (six seats) ===
Carmarthen 1913
Party	Candidate	Votes	%	±%
Independent	Georgina M.E. White*	Unopposed		
Independent	Miss Margaret A. Thomas*	Unopposed		
Independent	Andrew Fuller-Mills*	Unopposed		
Independent	Thomas Williams	Unopposed		
Independent	J. Patagonia Lewis*	Unopposed		
Independent	Thomas Thomas	Unopposed		
Independent hold		Swing		
Independent hold		Swing		
Independent hold		Swing		
Independent hold		Swing		
Independent hold		Swing		
Independent hold		Swing		
