= 1910 Carmarthen Rural District Council election =

Welsh local election

An election to the Carmarthen Rural District Council was held in April 1910. It was preceded by the 1907 election and followed by the 1913 election. The successful candidates were also elected to the Carmarthen Board of Guardians. A significant number of members were returned unopposed.

== Ward results ==
=== Abergwili (two seats) ===
Abergwili 1910
Party	Candidate	Votes	%	±%
Independent	D. Harries Davies	145		
Independent	W. Williams	138		
Independent	John Williams*	130		
Independent	David Davies	83		
Independent hold		Swing		
Independent hold		Swing		

=== Abernant (one seat) ===
Abernant 1910
Party	Candidate	Votes	%	±%
Independent	T. Davies	Unopposed		
Independent hold		Swing		

=== Conwil (two seats) ===
Conwil 1910
Party	Candidate	Votes	%	±%
Independent	Benjamin Phillips*	150		
Independent	Evan James	139		
Independent	Thomas Howell	136		
Independent	John Davies*	51		
Independent hold		Swing		
Independent hold		Swing		

=== Laugharne Parish (one seat) ===
Laugharne Parish 1910
Party	Candidate	Votes	%	±%
Independent	James Lewis	Unopposed		
Independent hold		Swing		

=== Laugharne Township (one seat) ===
Laugharne Township 1910
Party	Candidate	Votes	%	±%
Independent	W. Towers Smith	Unopposed		
Independent hold		Swing		

=== Llanarthney (two seats) ===
W.J. Thomas stood down having recently been elected to Carmarthenshire County Council. David Farr Davies, whom he defeated in that contest was elected unopposed after two candidates, including the other sitting member, William Brazell, withdrew.

Llanarthney 1910
Party	Candidate	Votes	%	±%
Independent	D. Farr Davies	Unopposed		
Independent	William Harries	Unopposed		
Independent hold		Swing		
Independent hold		Swing		

=== Llandawke and Llansadurnen (one seat) ===
Llandawke and Llansadurnen 1910
Party	Candidate	Votes	%	±%
Independent	W.R. Rees*	Unopposed		
Independent hold		Swing		

=== Llanddarog (one seat) ===
Llanddarog 1910
Party	Candidate	Votes	%	±%
Independent	James William Lewis	119		
Independent	Mrs Maria Morris	112		
Independent	John Grugos Williams	99		
Independent hold		Swing		

=== Llandeilo Abercowyn and Llangynog (one seat) ===
Llandeilo Abercowyn and Llangynog 1910
Party	Candidate	Votes	%	±%
Independent	Johnny Bowen	71		
Independent	J. Griffiths	62		
Independent hold		Swing		

=== Llanddowror (one seat) ===
Llanddowror 1910
Party	Candidate	Votes	%	±%
Independent	James Thomas	Unopposed		
Independent hold		Swing		

=== Llandyfaelog (one seat) ===
Llandyfaelog 1910
Party	Candidate	Votes	%	±%
Independent	Herbert Walters	Unopposed		
Independent hold		Swing		

=== Llanfihangel Abercowin (one seat) ===
Llanfihangel Abercowin 1910
Party	Candidate	Votes	%	±%
Independent	Evan Williams*	Unopposed		
Independent hold		Swing		

=== Llangain (one seat) ===
Llangain 1910
Party	Candidate	Votes	%	±%
Independent	David Thomas	Unopposed		
Independent hold		Swing		

=== Llangendeirne (two seats) ===
Llangendeirne 1910
Party	Candidate	Votes	%	±%
Independent	D.T. Gilbert*	235		
Independent	John Lewis*	208		
Independent	D.G. Jones	137		
Independent hold		Swing		
Independent hold		Swing		

=== Llangunnor (one seat) ===
Llangunnor 1910
Party	Candidate	Votes	%	±%
Independent	David Phillips	Unopposed		
Independent hold		Swing		

=== Llangynin (one seat) ===
Llangynin 1910
Party	Candidate	Votes	%	±%
Independent	Llewellyn Morgan	Unopposed		
Independent hold		Swing		

=== Llanllawddog (one seat) ===
Llanllawddog 1910
Party	Candidate	Votes	%	±%
Independent	Daniel Davies	Unopposed		
Independent hold		Swing		

=== Llanpumsaint (one seat) ===
Llanpumsaint 1910
Party	Candidate	Votes	%	±%
Independent	T. Davies	Unopposed		
Independent hold		Swing		

=== Llanstephan (one seat) ===
Llanstephan 1910
Party	Candidate	Votes	%	±%
Independent	John Francis*	Unopposed		
Independent hold		Swing		

=== Llanwinio (one seat) ===
Llanwinio 1910
Party	Candidate	Votes	%	±%
Independent	Richard Lewis	Unopposed		
Independent hold		Swing		

=== Merthyr (one seat) ===
Merthyr 1910
Party	Candidate	Votes	%	±%
Independent	Thomas Davies*	Unopposed		
Independent hold		Swing		

=== Mydrim (one seat) ===
Mydrim 1910
Party	Candidate	Votes	%	±%
Independent	Morris J. Evans	92		
Independent	David Thomas	40		
Independent hold		Swing		

=== Newchurch (one seat) ===
Newchurch 1910
Party	Candidate	Votes	%	±%
Independent	David Edwards	Unopposed		
Independent hold		Swing		

=== St Clears (one seat) ===
St Clears 1910
Party	Candidate	Votes	%	±%
Independent	David John*	110		
Independent	Thomas Thomas Lloyd	92		
Independent hold		Swing		

=== St Ishmaels (one seat) ===
St Ishmaels 1910
Party	Candidate	Votes	%	±%
Independent	John Jones*	Unopposed		
Independent hold		Swing		

=== Trelech a'r Betws (two seats) ===
Trelech a'r Betws 1910
Party	Candidate	Votes	%	±%
Independent	D.G. Bowen*	Unopposed		
Independent	J. Sylvanus Williams*	Unopposed		
Independent hold		Swing		
Independent hold		Swing		

== Carmarthen Board of Guardians ==
All members of the District Council also served as members of Carmarthen Board of Guardians. In addition six members were elected to represent the borough of Carmarthen.

There was a contested election which saw the five retiring members re-elected.

=== Carmarthen (six seats) ===
Carmarthen 1910
Party	Candidate	Votes	%	±%
Independent	Georgina M.E. White*	1,183		
Independent	Miss Margaret A. Thomas*	1,117		
Independent	Andrew Fuller-Mills*	1,068		
Independent	Thomas Williams	999		
Independent	J. Patagonia Lewis*	905		
Independent	Thomas Thomas	902		
Independent	J.T. Lewis*	846		
Independent	William Jones	629		
Independent hold		Swing		
Independent hold		Swing		
Independent hold		Swing		
Independent hold		Swing		
Independent hold		Swing		
Independent hold		Swing		
