= 1894 Carmarthen Rural District Council election =

Welsh local election

The first election to the Carmarthen Rural District Council in Carmarthenshire, Wales was held in December 1894. It was followed by the 1898 election. The successful candidates were also elected to the Carmarthen Board of Guardians. In rural parishes, many councillors were returned unopposed.

The rural district included the parishes of Abergwili, Abernant, Cynwyl Elfed, Laugharne, Llanarthney, Llanddarog, Llandyfaelog, Llanddowror, Llanfihangel Abercowyn, Llangain, Llangyndeyrn, Llangynog (with Llandeilo Abercywyn), Llangynin, Llangunnor, Llanllawddog, Llanpumsaint, Llansteffan, Llanwinio, Merthyr, Meidrym, Newchurch, St Clears, St Ishmaels, and Trelech a'r Betws.

== Outcome ==
The majority of those elected to the first Rural District Council were farmers. Women were eligible to stand in contests for district councils, and in St Ishmaels, Elizabeth Mary Gwyn was successful by a small majority. Political affiliations were generally not declared during the election.

Due to "a curious blunder" no councillor was elected to represent the Llandawke and Llansadurnen ward.

== The 1894-98 Council ==
The first meeting of the authority took place at the Shire Hall, Carmarthen on 29 December 1894. A vote was taken to elect a chairman, and John Phillips of Caerlleon, Llanwinio defeated David E. Stephens by sixteen votes to ten. Phillips was a prominent Liberal who was also a member of Carmarthenshire County Council. Stephens, in contrast, had stood unsuccessfully in county elections at Llangunnor in 1889 and Cynwyl Elfed in 1892.

== Ward results ==
=== Abergwili (two seats) ===
Abergwili 1894
Party	Candidate	Votes	%	±%
Independent	John Griffiths	195		
Independent	David Davies	146		
Independent	David Harries Davies	122		
Independent	E.H. Francis	111		
Independent win (new seat)				
Independent win (new seat)				

=== Abernant (one seat) ===
Abernant 1894
Party	Candidate	Votes	%	±%
Independent	David Bowen	Unopposed		
Independent win (new seat)				

=== Conwil (two seats) ===
Conwil 1894
Party	Candidate	Votes	%	±%
Independent	David Griffiths	Unopposed		
Independent	David Thomas	Unopposed		
Independent win (new seat)				
Independent win (new seat)				

=== Laugharne Parish (one seat) ===
Laugharne Parish 1894
Party	Candidate	Votes	%	±%
Independent	John Rees John	Unopposed		
Independent win (new seat)				

=== Laugharne Township (one seat) ===
Morse withdrew too late to avoid a poll.

Laugharne Township 1894
Party	Candidate	Votes	%	±%
Independent	William Thomas	120		
Independent	John D. Morse	8		
Independent win (new seat)				

=== Llanarthney (two seats) ===
Llanarthney 1894
Party	Candidate	Votes	%	±%
Independent	Stephen Stephens	Unopposed		
Independent	William Thomas	Unopposed		
Independent win (new seat)				
Independent win (new seat)				

=== Llandawke and Llansadurnen (one seat) ===
No nominations were received.

=== Llanddarog (one seat) ===
Llanddarog 1894
Party	Candidate	Votes	%	±%
Independent	John Davies	Unopposed		
Independent win (new seat)				

=== Llandeilo Abercowyn and Llangynog (one seat) ===
Llandeilo Abercowyn and Llangynog 1894
Party	Candidate	Votes	%	±%
Independent	David Harries	Unopposed		
Independent win (new seat)				

=== Llanddowror (one seat) ===
Llanddowror 1894
Party	Candidate	Votes	%	±%
Independent	Rev Thomas Jones	Unopposed		
Independent win (new seat)				

=== Llandyfaelog (one seat) ===
It was reported that the contest had been instigated after Rees defeated the local Independent minister, Evan Powell, at a parish meeting.

Llandyfaelog 1894
Party	Candidate	Votes	%	±%
Independent	Thomas Rees	127		
Independent	John Jones	49		
Independent hold		Swing		

=== Llanfihangel Abercowin (one seat) ===
Llanfihangel Abercowin 1894
Party	Candidate	Votes	%	±%
Independent	David Thomas	65		
Independent	David Walters	48		
Independent win (new seat)				

=== Llangain (one seat) ===
Llangain 1894
Party	Candidate	Votes	%	±%
Independent	John Lloyd Thomas	Unopposed		
Independent win (new seat)				

=== Llangendeirne (two seats) ===
Llangendeirne 1894
Party	Candidate	Votes	%	±%
Independent	William Thomas	Unopposed		
Independent	Thomas Williams	Unopposed		
Independent win (new seat)				
Independent win (new seat)				

=== Llangunnor (one seat) ===
Llangunnor 1894
Party	Candidate	Votes	%	±%
Independent	David Prosser	Unopposed		
Independent win (new seat)				

=== Llangynin (one seat) ===
Llangynin 1894
Party	Candidate	Votes	%	±%
Independent	Roger Davies			
Independent	John Thomas Williams			
Independent win (new seat)				

=== Llanllawddog (one seat) ===
Llanllawddog 1894
Party	Candidate	Votes	%	±%
Independent	Evan Daniel	Unopposed		
Independent win (new seat)				

=== Llanpumsaint (one seat) ===
Llanpumsaint 1894
Party	Candidate	Votes	%	±%
Independent	David Evans	87		
Independent	Henry Harries			
Independent	John Richards			
Independent win (new seat)				

=== Llanstephan (one seat) ===
Llanstephan 1894
Party	Candidate	Votes	%	±%
Independent	Griffith Barrett Evans	Unopposed		
Independent win (new seat)				

=== Llanwinio (one seat) ===
Llanwinio 1894
Party	Candidate	Votes	%	±%
Independent	John Phillips	Unopposed		
Independent win (new seat)				

=== Merthyr (one seat) ===
Merthyr 1894
Party	Candidate	Votes	%	±%
Independent	David Evans	Unopposed		
Independent win (new seat)				

=== Mydrim (one seat) ===
Mydrim 1894
Party	Candidate	Votes	%	±%
Independent	Howell Davies	Unopposed		
Independent win (new seat)				

=== Newchurch (one seat) ===
Newchurch 1894
Party	Candidate	Votes	%	±%
Independent	David Evan Stephens	Unopposed		
Independent win (new seat)				

=== St Clears (one seat) ===
St Clears 1894
Party	Candidate	Votes	%	±%
Independent	Philip Thomas	114		
Independent	Thomas Beynon	55		
Independent win (new seat)				

=== St Ishmaels (one seat) ===
St Ishmaels 1894
Party	Candidate	Votes	%	±%
Independent	Elizabeth Mary Gwyn	98		
Independent	William Thomas	95		
Independent win (new seat)				

== Carmarthen Board of Guardians ==
All members of the District Council also served as members of Carmarthen Board of Guardians. In addition, six members were elected to represent the borough of Carmarthen. Edith Hancock was a member of a prominent Carmarthen family, being the daughter of David Archard Williams, incumbent of St David's Church for 37 years until his death in 1879

=== Carmarthen (six seats) ===
Carmarthen 1894
Party	Candidate	Votes	%	±%
Independent	Edith Mary Hancock	892		
Independent	Jonah Davies	752		
Independent	Jonathan Phillips	705		
Independent	Isobel Gertrude Anne Thomas	692		
Independent	William Thomas	596		
Independent	Thomas Thomas	550		
Independent	Edward Lewis	550		
Independent	John Patagonia Lewis	509		
Independent	D. Parcell Rees	489		
Independent	James Phillips	396		
Independent	John Lewis	371		
Independent	Walter Jenkin Evans	274		
Independent	Andrew Fuller-Mills	269		
Independent	John Jeremy	135		
Independent hold		Swing		
Independent hold		Swing		
Independent hold		Swing		
Independent hold		Swing		
Independent hold		Swing		
Independent hold		Swing		
