= Rosina Davies =

Welsh evangelist

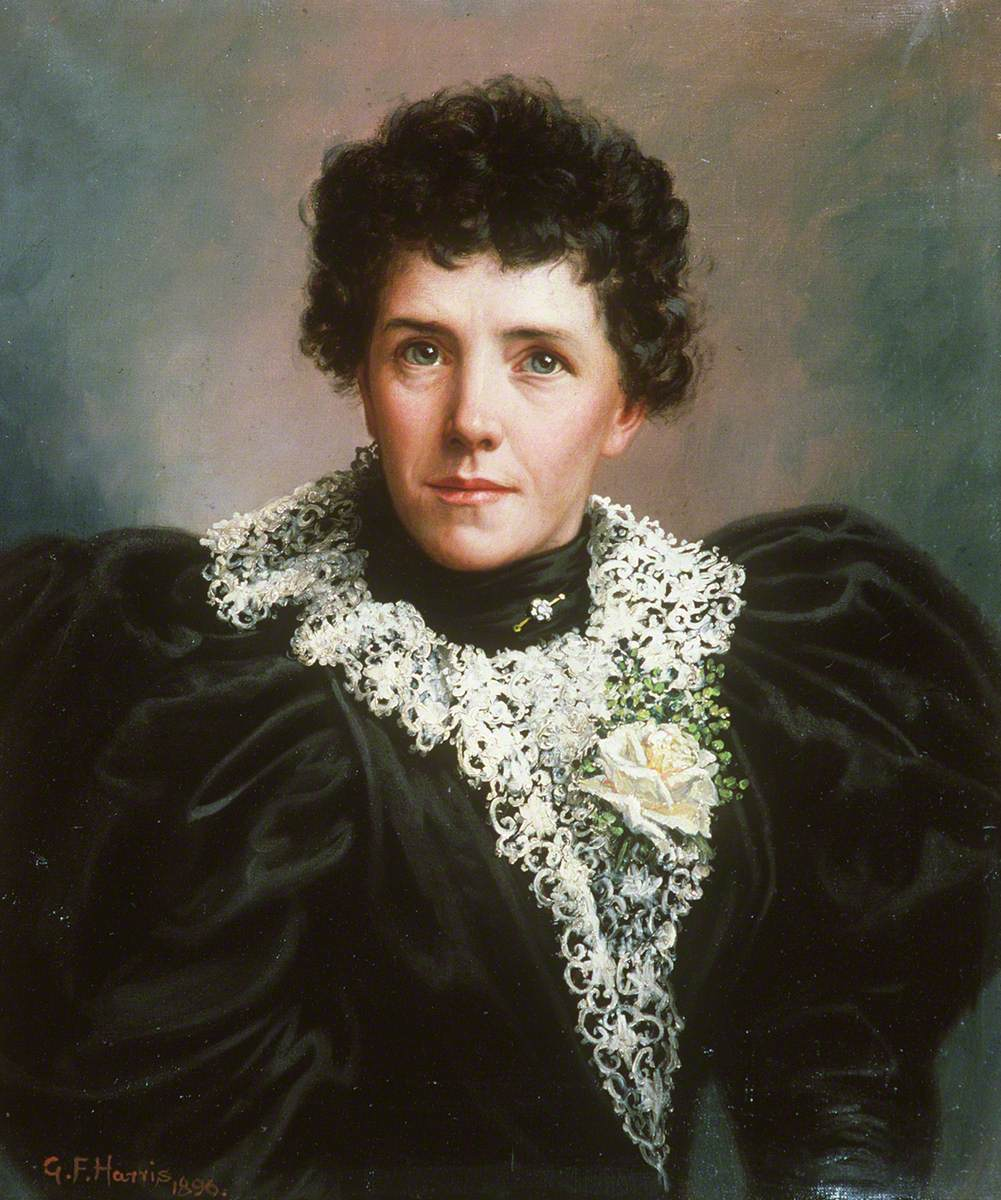
- Rosina Davies in 1896
- Born: Rosina Davies; 2 September 1863; Treherbert, Glamorgan, Wales
- Died: 21 October 1949 (aged 86)
- Occupation: Evangelist

Rosina Davies (2 September 1863 – 21 October 1949) was a Welsh evangelist during the 1904–1905 Welsh revival.

== Personal life ==
Davies was born in Treherbert, Glamorgan in 1863. She was the third of six children. She was homeschooled. Davies is the great aunt of Welsh author, actor and singer Siân Phillips. During her life, Davies was painted by George Frederick Harris, grandfather of Rolf Harris. Davies stood as an independent candidate for St Ishmaels in the 1919 Carmarthen Rural District Council election. She came last with 25 votes.

== Evangelism ==
Aged 14, Davies left home to join a Salvation Army mission in Maesteg. She started doing preaching tours in 1881. In 1893, she held a mission service for Welsh people living in Chicago, Illinois and in 1900, she held a mission service in Llangollen, Denbighshire. Davies was a free church evangelist during the 1904–1905 Welsh revival, appointed by the Union of Welsh Independents in 1904. Early in 1904, she held missions in Rhosllannerchrugog, and one mission that she held in autumn 1904 resulted in two hours of weeping and worship. She worked for the Union of Welsh Independents until 1916. From 1916 to 1930, she worked as a secretary of the South Wales Women's Temperance Union (Welsh: Undeb Dirwestol Merched y De. In 1930–31, she went on a preaching tour of the U.S. and Canada.

In 1942, Davies published her autobiography The Story of My Life. The book contained diary records as well as a detailed account of her life and insight into the social life and religious Wales from the late 19th century onward.
