= 1937 Carmarthen Rural District Council election =

1937 Welsh local government election

An election to the Carmarthen Rural District Council in Wales was held on 5 April 1937.

It was preceded by the 1934 election but some wards had been contested in 1935 following the amalgamation of Whitland RDC. Due to the Second World War it was followed by the 1946 election.

== Boundary changes ==
There were no boundary changes at this election.

== Candidates ==
As was usual in rural Wales during the inter-war period, the election was largely fought on a non-political basis. Twenty candidates were returned unopposed; nineteen of whom were Independent candidates. Gwilym Rees, who had won the Llanddarog ward for Labour in 1934 was also returned unopposed. The only other Labour candidates defended seats at Llanarthney and Llangyndeyrn.

== Outcome ==
The first election to the enlarged council, following the amalgamation of Whitland RDC provided few surprises. The most noted result was the defeat of Hannah Mary Rees, the only woman member, at Whitland. She was defeated by W.S. Cole, a past chairman of the Whitland RDC. At Llanarthney, Thomas Thomas, a former Labour chairman of the council, who had lost his seat in 1931, was returned at the head of the poll.

== Ward results ==
=== Abergwili (one seat) ===
Abergwili 1937
Party	Candidate	Votes	%	±%
Independent	Thomas Duncan Dempster*	Unopposed		
Independent hold		Swing		

=== Abernant (one seat) ===
Abernant 1937
Party	Candidate	Votes	%	±%
Independent	David Jones*	Unopposed		
Independent hold		Swing		

=== Cilymaenllwyd (one seat) ===
Cilymaenllwyd 1937
Party	Candidate	Votes	%	±%
Independent	David Garrick Protheroe*	Unopposed		
Independent hold		Swing		

=== Conwil (two seats) ===
Conwil 1937
Party	Candidate	Votes	%	±%
Independent	William Howell Phillips	263		
Independent	Glyn Evan Howells	207		
Independent hold		Swing		

=== Eglwyscummin (one seat) ===
Eglwyscummin 1937
Party	Candidate	Votes	%	±%
Independent	James Howells*	Unopposed		
Independent hold		Swing		

=== Henllanfallteg (one seat) ===
Henllanfallteg 1937
Party	Candidate	Votes	%	±%
Independent	{{{candidate}}}	Unopposed		
Independent hold		Swing		

=== Laugharne Township (one seat) ===
Laugharne Township 1937
Party	Candidate	Votes	%	±%
Independent	Robert Henry Tyler	Unopposed		
Independent hold		Swing		

=== Llanarthney North Ward (one seat) ===
Llanarthney North Ward 1937
Party	Candidate	Votes	%	±%
Independent	John Thomas*	Unopposed		
Independent hold		Swing		

=== Llanarthney South Ward (two seats) ===
Llanarthney South Ward 1937
Party	Candidate	Votes	%	±%
Labour	Thomas Thomas	869		
Labour	David Morgan Davies*	858		
Independent	David James	458		
Labour hold		Swing		
Labour hold		Swing		

=== Llanboidy Ward No. 1 (one seat) ===
Llanboidy Ward No. 1 1937
Party	Candidate	Votes	%	±%
Independent	John Jones*	Unopposed		
Independent hold		Swing		

=== Llanboidy Ward No. 2 (one seat) ===
Llanboidy Ward No. 2 1937
Party	Candidate	Votes	%	±%
Independent	John Ivor Davies*	141		
Independent	Daniel James Williams	59		
Independent hold		Swing		

=== Llandissilio East (one seat) ===
Llandissilio East 1937
Party	Candidate	Votes	%	±%
Independent	John Devonald Williams*	Unopposed		
Independent hold		Swing		

=== Llanddarog (one seat) ===
Llanddarog 1937
Party	Candidate	Votes	%	±%
Labour	Gwilym Rees	Unopposed		
Labour hold		Swing		

=== Llanddowror (two seats) ===
Llanddowror 1937
Party	Candidate	Votes	%	±%
Independent	Henry Rhys Jones*	Unopposed		
Independent	George Alfred Lewis*	Unopposed		
Independent hold		Swing		
Independent hold		Swing		

=== Llandyfaelog (one seat) ===
Llandyfaelog 1937
Party	Candidate	Votes	%	±%
Independent	William Anthony	Unopposed		
Independent hold		Swing		

=== Llanfihangel Abercowin (one seat) ===
Llanfihangel Abercowin 1937
Party	Candidate	Votes	%	±%
Independent	David Williams	264		
Independent	William Paul Lewis	163		
Independent hold		Swing		

=== Llangain (one seat) ===
Llangain 1937
Party	Candidate	Votes	%	±%
Independent	John Lewis*	Unopposed		
Independent hold		Swing		

=== Llangendeirne (two seats) ===
Llangendeirne 1937
Party	Candidate	Votes	%	±%
Labour	Richard Williams*	645		
Independent	William Thomas*	495		
Independent	David John Jeremy	410		
Labour hold		Swing		
Independent hold		Swing		

=== Llangunnor (one seat) ===
Llangunnor 1937
Party	Candidate	Votes	%	±%
Independent	John Jones	166		
Independent	Benjamin Evans	105		
Independent	David Thomas	105		
Independent	James Ellis Hughes	99		
Independent hold		Swing		

=== Llangynin (one seat) ===
Llangynin 1937
Party	Candidate	Votes	%	±%
Independent	Stephen Davies	Unopposed		
Independent hold		Swing		

=== Llangynog (one seat) ===
Llangynog 1937
Party	Candidate	Votes	%	±%
Independent	Isaac Evans	126		
Independent	Joseph Thomas*	125		
Independent hold		Swing		

=== Llanllawddog (one seat) ===
Llanllawddog 1937
Party	Candidate	Votes	%	±%
Independent	George Dyer*	Unopposed		
Independent hold		Swing		

=== Llanpumsaint (one seat) ===
Llanpumsaint 1931
Party	Candidate	Votes	%	±%
Independent	David John Richards	Unopposed		
Independent hold		Swing		

=== Llanstephan (one seat) ===
Llanstephan 1937
Party	Candidate	Votes	%	±%
Independent	Ambrose Myrddin Lloyd*	Unopposed		
Independent hold		Swing		

=== Mydrim (one seat) ===
Mydrim 1934
Party	Candidate	Votes	%	±%
Independent	Henry Daniel Jenkins*	Unopposed		
Independent	David Henry Lewis	73		
Independent hold		Swing		

=== Newchurch (one seat) ===
Newchurch 1937
Party	Candidate	Votes	%	±%
Independent	David Jones	Unopposed		
Independent	George Daniel	162		
Independent hold		Swing		

=== Pendine (one seat) ===
Pendine 1937
Party	Candidate	Votes	%	±%
Independent	Tom Pomeroy*	Unopposed		
Independent hold		Swing		

=== St Clears (one seat) ===
St Clears 1937
Party	Candidate	Votes	%	±%
Independent	David Theophilus Davies*	203		
Independent	John Morgan	162		
Independent hold		Swing		

=== St Ishmaels (one seat) ===
St Ishmaels 1937
Party	Candidate	Votes	%	±%
Independent	Evan Wilkins*	Unopposed		
Independent hold		Swing		

=== Trelech a'r Betws (one seat) ===
Trelech a'r Betws 1937
Party	Candidate	Votes	%	±%
Independent	Simon Owen Thomas*	Unopposed		
Independent hold		Swing		

=== Whitland (two seats) ===
Whitland 1937
Party	Candidate	Votes	%	±%
Independent	William Hughes Mathias*	399		
Independent	William Sandbrook Cole*	311		
Independent	Hannah Mary Rees*	270		
Independent hold		Swing		
Independent hold		Swing		
