= John Dyfnallt Owen =

Welsh poet and minister

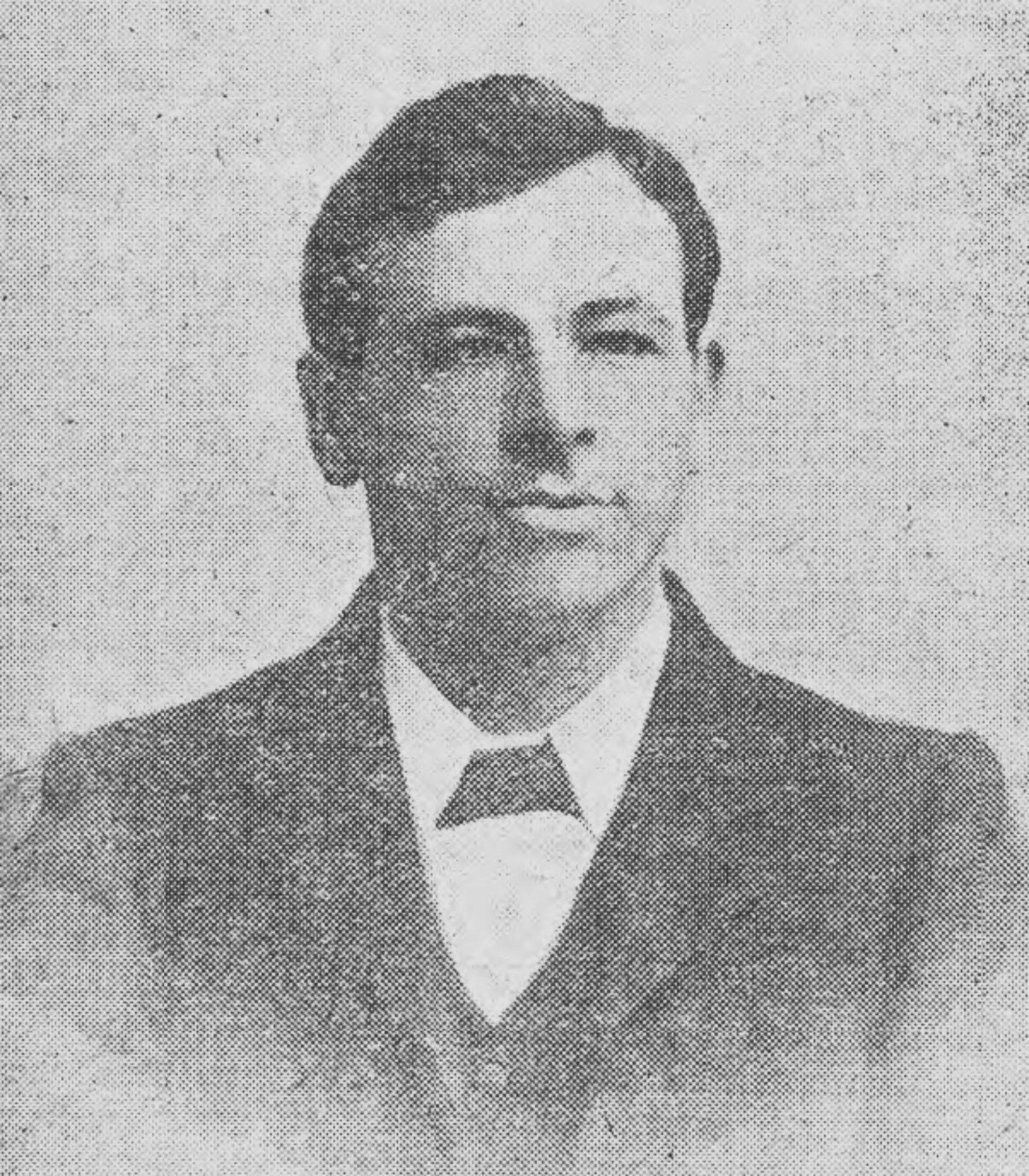
Rev. John Dyfnallt Owen

Rev. John Dyfnallt Owen (7 April 1873 – 28 December 1956) was a Welsh poet, and served as Archdruid of the National Eisteddfod of Wales from 1954 until his death. He was often known simply by his bardic name, "Dyfnallt".

== Personal life ==
Owen was born in Llangiwg, near Pontardawe, Glamorgan, the son of David and Angharad Owen, and was brought up by his grandparents because of the death of his mother when he was an infant. He married Annie Hopkin in 1904 and had two children.

== Education and career ==
He worked for a short period as a coal miner, then attended Bala Bangor College.

Having been ordained as a Congregational minister, he became a minister at Trawsfynydd (1898-1902) and Deiniolen (1902-5) before moving to Sardis Chapel at Pontypridd in 1905. In 1910 he was inducted as minister of Lammas Street Chapel, Carmarthen. He remained there until his retirement from the ministry in 1947. During his time there he was elected to the Carmarthen Board of Guardians in 1919.

During World War I, he served as a chaplain in France. In 1927, he became editor of the Welsh-language journal Y Tyst. In 1936 he became President of the Union of Welsh Independents (Chapels). Like all Archdruids, he was a winner of a major poetry prize at the National Eisteddfod, in his case the crown at the 1907 Eisteddfod in Swansea. He joined the Celtic Congress in 1908 and maintained a lifelong interest in Breton affairs, writing a book in 1934 and was part of the Welsh delegation investigating French abuses of the Breton movement after WWII. He hosted the Breton Literary figure Roparz Hemon at his own home when he fled France in 1946. He gained an hon. M.A. degree from the University of Wales in 1953. At the age of 80 he was elected Archdruid of Wales at Rhyl in 1954.

== Works ==
- Myfyrion a chaneuon maes y tân (1918), (poems and meditations on his experiences on the battlefield)
- O ben tir Llydaw (1934)
- Min yr hwyr (1934)
- Y greal a cherddi eraill (1946)
- Rhamant a Rhyddid (1952)
- Ar y tŵr (1953)

== Other reading ==
- Geraint Elfyn Jones, Bywyd a gwaith John Dyfnallt Owen (Swansea 1976)
- Emrys Jones in Derec Llwyd Morgan, Adnabod deg. Portreadau o ddeg o arweinwyr cynnar y Blaid Genedlaethol (Denbigh 1977)
- Journal of the Welsh Bibliographical Society, 11, 120–8, for his bibliography.
- The Celtic Times 15 July 1947. http://bibliotheque.idbe-bzh.org/data/cle_160/An_Aimsear_Ceiltiac_1947_july__.pdf
