= Carmarthen Rural District =

Former Rural District of Carmarthenshire, Wales

Carmarthen Rural District Council
- History
  - Created: 1894
  - Abolished: 1974
  - Succeeded by: Carmarthen District Council
- Status: Rural District
  - HQ: Carmarthen

Carmarthen Rural District Council was a local authority in the central part of Carmarthenshire, Wales created in 1894. The first election to the authority was held in December 1894.

Like similar local authorities established in 1894, Carmarthen Rural District Council was responsible for housing, sanitation and public health and also had some control over roads and water supply.

The authority covered the parishes of Abergwili, Cynwyl Elfed, Llanarthey, Llanddarog, Llandyfaelog, Llangain, Llangyndeyrn, Llangynog, Llansteffan, Merthyr, Newchurch and St Ishmaels.

It was a predominantly rural and agricultural area, though when the Rural District was established, coal mining was expanding in the south-eastern parishes of Llanarthney and Llangyndeyrn. While most of the elected members were Independent or non-political, the industrial parishes were in represented by Labour councillors after the First World War.

The authority was abolished following local government reorganisation in 1974, and its role taken on by Carmarthen District Council.
