= Henry Jones-Davies (farmer) =

Welsh farmer and politician

Henry Jones-Davies (2 January 1870 - 16 June 1955) was a Carmarthenshire farmer who became active in public life and a pioneer of agricultural co-operation.

Jones-Davies was born at Bremenda, Llanarthney, Carmarthenshire, Wales, the son of Thomas and Elizabeth Davies and educated at Queen Elizabeth Grammar School, Carmarthen.

== Local government ==
Thomas Davies of Bremenda was involved in local government, though unlike his son his politics were Conservative. In 1889 he was elected as the first county councillor for Llanarthney, defeating the Liberal candidate, the Rev D.S. Davies and another Conservative, the Rev R.G. Lawrence of Middleton Hall. However, some months later he was involved in a fatal accident after falling off his horse. The vacancy was subsequently filled by the Rev R.G. Lawrence, the unsuccessful Conservative candidate the previous year, who wa returned unopposed.

In February 1892 it was announced that Jones-Davies would contest his father's old seat against R.G. Lawrence. He was elected by a comfortable majority.

Jones-Davies was re-elected unopposed in 1895, 1898, 1901 and 1904. In 1907 he faced a significant challenge from David Farr-Davies, a senior colliery official, but held on by a relatively small majority.

In 1894 he became the first chairman of the local parish council at 22.

== Parliamentary aspirations ==
In 1910, he was narrowly defeated by John Hinds in his bid to be the Liberal candidate for West Carmarthenshire.

== Pioneer of the Co-operative Movement ==
In 1902, as chairman of Carmarthenshire County Council, Jones-Davies acted as secretary of a deputation from the three counties of south west Wales who visited Ireland to witness the agricultural cooperation societies already established there. He was a founder member of the Carmarthenshire Farmers' Co-operation Society the following year. He remained active in the movement for the rest of his life.

== Personal life ==
Jones-Davies was married, in 1903, to Winifred Anna Ellis, sister of the late Liberal politician Tom Ellis. He died in 1955.

His son, Tommy Jones-Davies, became a prominent surgeon who also played rugby union for Wales and the British Lions
