= 1892 Carmarthenshire County Council election =

Welsh local election

All 68 seats to Carmarthenshire County Council 35 seats needed for a majority
	First party	Second party	Third party
Party	Liberal	Conservative	Liberal Unionist
Last election	53/68	12/68	2/68
Seats before	55/68	9/68	2/68
Seats won	55/68	9/68	1/68
Councillors	40	7	1
Aldermen	15	2	0
Seats +/–	▲2	▼3	▼1
	Fourth party
Party	Independent
Last election	1/68
Seats before	1/68
Seats won	3/68
Councillors	1
Aldermen	0
Seats +/–	▲2
Council control after election
Liberal
Liberal Party

The second election to the Carmarthenshire County Council was held in March 1892. It was preceded by the 1889 election and followed by the 1895 election.

== Overview of the result ==
The Liberals retained a strong majority which they had gained at the inaugural election in 1889, although they lost a small number of seats. The election coincided with a divisive debate over the choice of a Liberal candidate to contest the Carmarthen Boroughs constituency at the forthcoming General Election.

== Boundary changes ==
There were no significant changes but the multi-member seats which existed in 1889, mostly in Llanelli area but also at Pembrey (Burry Port) and Whitland were replaced by single-member wards.

== Candidates ==
Of the 51 seats, only 20 were contested, compared with a very small number of unopposed returns at the inaugural election three years previously. 32 of those elected in 1889 stood for re-election.

Of the seven retiring aldermen, only two stood as candidates at the election. Sir James Hills-Johnes contested Caio for the Conservatives while C.E. Morris, elevated to the aldermanic bench following a vacancy the previous year, was returned unopposed for his former seat at Llangunnor. Alderman Morgan Davies of Llandeilo died shortly before the election.

== Outcome ==
The contested elections saw a number of closely-fought wards and the defeat of some high profile members of the previous council. These included Gwilym Evans, the chairman of the council, who was defeated in one of the new Llanelli wards by another retiring member, W.J. Wilson, and another leading Liberal, Henry Wilkins, lost by six votes to Conservative Ernest Trubshaw. Prominent Conservative, J.S. Tregoning, was also defeated at Llanelli by a large margin. At Llangeler, disputes in the woollen industry centred on Drefach Felindre predominated in a contest where the Conservative Thomas Thomas ousted the sitting member, John Lewis, a woollen manufacturer. Evans, Tregoning, Wilkins and Lewis all remained members of the council, however, as they were made aldermen.

At Caio, Sir James Hills-Johnes won the seat where he was defeated in 1889, A closely fought contest at Carmarthen saw veteran Liberal Unionist Henry Norton losing by nine votes to the Liberal candidate, John Thomas.

Notwithstanding these individual contests, the Liberals were assured of their majority before a single vote was cast and while their position was slightly stronger than in 1889 the numbers were unchanged as two seats (one elected and one aldermanic) had been gained during the term of the previous council.

The Liberal members of the Council were criticised by local Conservative newspapers, notably the Carmarthen Journal, for allocating only one aldermanic seat to their political opponents. This contrasted to the position in neighbouring Cardiganshire, where three of the eight aldermanic seats were allocated to Conservatives. Colonel Gwynne Hughes of Glancothy, a retiring alderman, finished in tenth place in the vote and was not re-elected.

== Ward results ==
=== Abergwili ===
Some sources state that Lloyd stood as a Unionist candidate at this election.

Abergwili 1892
Party	Candidate	Votes	%	±%
Liberal	John Lloyd	unopposed		
Liberal hold		Swing		

=== Bettws ===
Bettws 1892
Party	Candidate	Votes	%	±%
Liberal	William Nathaniel Jones*	unopposed		
Liberal hold		Swing		

=== Caio ===
Caio 1892
Party	Candidate	Votes	%	±%
Conservative	Sir James Hills-Johnes**	253		
Liberal	Rev T. Thomas	153		
Majority		100		
Conservative gain from Liberal		Swing		

=== Carmarthen Eastern Ward (Lower Division) ===
Carmarthen Eastern Ward (Lower Division) 1892
Party	Candidate	Votes	%	±%
Liberal	Thomas Jenkins*	293		
Conservative	E.A. Rogers	146		
Majority		147		
Liberal hold		Swing		

=== Carmarthen Eastern Ward (Upper Division) ===
Carmarthen Eastern Ward (Upper Division) 1892
Party	Candidate	Votes	%	±%
Liberal	John Thomas	189		
Liberal Unionist	H. Norton*	180		
Majority		9		
Liberal gain from Liberal Unionist		Swing		

=== Carmarthen Western Ward (Lower Division) ===
Carmarthen Western Ward (Lower Division) 1892
Party	Candidate	Votes	%	±%
Conservative	D.H. Thomas*	unopposed		
Conservative hold		Swing		

=== Carmarthen Western Ward (Upper Division) ===
Carmarthen Eastern Ward (Lower Division) 1892
Party	Candidate	Votes	%	±%
Liberal	Professor D.E. Jones*	unopposed		
Liberal hold		Swing		

=== Cenarth ===
Cenarth 1892
Party	Candidate	Votes	%	±%
Liberal	Edward Davies*	151		
Conservative	D. Davies	30		
Majority				
Liberal hold		Swing		

=== Cilycwm ===
Cilycwm 1892
Party	Candidate	Votes	%	±%
Liberal	Rev Thomas Evans*	unopposed		
Liberal hold		Swing		

=== Conwil ===
Conwil 1889
Party	Candidate	Votes	%	±%
Liberal	Evan Jones	253		
Conservative	David Evan Stephens	168		
Majority		85		
Liberal hold		Swing		

=== Kidwelly ===
Kidwelly 1892
Party	Candidate	Votes	%	±%
Liberal	Daniel Stephens*	254		
Conservative	Rowland Browne	221		
Majority		33		
Liberal hold		Swing		

=== Laugharne ===
Laugharne 1892
Party	Candidate	Votes	%	±%
Liberal	John D. Morse	unopposed		
Liberal hold		Swing		

=== Llanarthney ===
Llanarthney 1892
Party	Candidate	Votes	%	±%
Liberal	Henry Jones-Davies	263		
Conservative	Rev R.G. Lawrence*	208		
Majority		55		
Liberal gain from Conservative		Swing		

=== Llanboidy ===
Llanboidy 1892
Party	Candidate	Votes	%	±%
Liberal	John Llewelyn*	244		
Liberal	David Thomas	242		
Majority		2		
Liberal hold		Swing		

=== Llandebie ===
Llandebie 1892
Party	Candidate	Votes	%	±%
Liberal	Henry Herbert	unopposed		
Liberal gain from Conservative		Swing		

=== Llandilo Rural ===
Llandilo Rural 1892
Party	Candidate	Votes	%	±%
Independent	William Jones*	297		
Liberal	Morgan Williams	255		
Majority		55		
Independent gain from Liberal		Swing		

=== Llandilo Urban ===
Llandilo Urban 1892
Party	Candidate	Votes	%	±%
Liberal	J.W. Gwynne Hughes*	147		
Conservative	T.G. Williams	124		
Majority		23		
Liberal hold		Swing		

=== Llandovery ===
Llandovery 1892
Party	Candidate	Votes	%	±%
Conservative	Walter G. Jeffreys	146		
Liberal	J. Walter Jones	122		
Majority		24		
Conservative hold		Swing		

=== Llanedy ===
Llanedy 1892
Party	Candidate	Votes	%	±%
Liberal	John Ll. Thomas	unopposed		
Liberal hold		Swing		

=== Llanegwad ===
Llanegwad 1892
Party	Candidate	Votes	%	±%
Liberal	H.J. Thomas	unopposed		
Liberal hold		Swing		

=== Llanelly Division 1 ===
Llanelly Division 1 1892
Party	Candidate	Votes	%	±%
Independent	W.J. Wilson*	250		
Liberal	Gwilym Evans*	203		
Majority		47		
Independent win (new seat)				

=== Llanelly Division 2 ===
Llanelly Division 2 1892
Party	Candidate	Votes	%	±%
Liberal	Joseph Mayberry*	unopposed		
Liberal win (new seat)				

=== Llanelly Division 3 ===
Llanelly Division 3 1892
Party	Candidate	Votes	%	±%
Conservative	Ernest Trubshaw	223		
Liberal	Henry Wilkins*	217		
Majority		6		
Conservative win (new seat)				

=== Llanelly Division 4 ===
Llanelly Division 4 1892
Party	Candidate	Votes	%	±%
Liberal	Rev Thomas Johns	Unopposed	N/A	N/A
Liberal win (new seat)				

=== Llanelly Division 5 ===
Llanelly Division 5 1892
Party	Candidate	Votes	%	±%
Liberal	D.C. Parry*	Unopposed	N/A	N/A
Liberal win (new seat)				

=== Llanelly Division 6 ===
Llanelly Division 6 1892
Party	Candidate	Votes	%	±%
Liberal	Thomas Phillips*	unopposed		
Liberal win (new seat)				

=== Llanelly Division 7 ===
Llanelly Division 7 1892
Party	Candidate	Votes	%	±%
Liberal	Isiah Beavan	317		
Conservative	J.S. Tregoning*	133		
Majority				
Liberal win (new seat)				

=== Llanelly Division 8 ===
Llanelly Division 8 1892
Party	Candidate	Votes	%	±%
Liberal	John Bourne*	250		
Conservative	John S. Tregoning jnr.	186		
Majority		64		
Liberal win (new seat)				

=== Llanelly Rural, Berwick ===
Llanelly Rural, Berwick 1892
Party	Candidate	Votes	%	±%
Liberal	Owen Bonville*	unopposed		
Liberal win (new seat)				

=== Llanelly Rural, Hengoed ===
Llanelly Rural, Hengoed 1892
Party	Candidate	Votes	%	±%
Liberal	David John	Unopposed		
Liberal win (new seat)				

=== Llanelly Rural, Westfa and Glyn ===
Llanelly Rural, Westfa and Glyn 1892
Party	Candidate	Votes	%	±%
Liberal	Rev P. Phillips*	60		
Liberal	J. Philpott	52		
Liberal	D. Evans	2		
Majority		9		
Liberal win (new seat)				

=== Llanfihangel Aberbythick ===
Llanfihangel Aberbythick 1892
Party	Candidate	Votes	%	±%
Conservative	Viscount Emlyn*	Unopposed	N/A	N/A
Conservative hold				

=== Llanfihangel-ar-Arth ===
Llanfihangel-ar-Arth 1892
Party	Candidate	Votes	%	±%
Liberal	Evan Harries*	Unopposed		
Liberal hold		Swing		

=== Llangadock ===
Llangadock 1892
Party	Candidate	Votes	%	±%
Liberal	L. Beavan			
Liberal	Rev W. Thomas			
Majority				
Liberal hold		Swing		

=== Llangeler ===
Llangeler 1892
Party	Candidate	Votes	%	±%
Conservative	Thomas Thomas	316		
Liberal	John Lewis*	264		
Majority		52		
Conservative gain from Liberal		Swing		

=== Llangendeirne ===
Llangendeirne 1892
Party	Candidate	Votes	%	±%
Liberal	W. Harries	unopposed		
Liberal hold		Swing		

=== Llangennech ===
Llangennech 1892
Party	Candidate	Votes	%	±%
Liberal	John Thomas	unopposed		
Liberal hold		Swing		

=== Llangunnor ===
Llangunnor 1892
Party	Candidate	Votes	%	±%
Liberal	C.E. Morris**	unopposed		
Liberal hold		Swing		

=== Llanon ===
Llanon 1892
Party	Candidate	Votes	%	±%
Liberal	Rev W.E. Evans*	unopposed		
Liberal hold		Swing		

=== Llansawel ===
Llansawel 1892
Party	Candidate	Votes	%	±%
Conservative	Sir J.H.W. Drummond, Bart.*	Unopposed	N/A	N/A
Conservative hold				

=== Llanstephan ===
Llanstephan 1892
Party	Candidate	Votes	%	±%
Liberal Unionist	Thomas Morris*	unopposed		
Liberal Unionist hold		Swing		

=== Llanybyther ===
Llanybyther 1892
Party	Candidate	Votes	%	±%
Liberal	D.H. James	unopposed		
Liberal gain from Conservative		Swing		

=== Mothvey ===
Mothvey 1889
Party	Candidate	Votes	%	±%
Liberal	George Jones*	unopposed		
Liberal hold		Swing		

=== Pembrey North ===
Pembrey North 1892
Party	Candidate	Votes	%	±%
Independent Liberal	W.J. Buckley*	255		
Liberal	John Owen	238		
Majority		22		
Independent Liberal win (new seat)				

=== Pembrey South ===
Pembrey South 1892
Party	Candidate	Votes	%	±%
Liberal	W.S. Marsh	unopposed		
Liberal win (new seat)				

=== Quarter Bach ===
Quarter Bach 1892
Party	Candidate	Votes	%	±%
Liberal	Dr Howell Rees*	unopposed		
Liberal hold		Swing		

=== Rhydcymmerai ===
Rhydcymmerai 1892
Party	Candidate	Votes	%	±%
Liberal	Daniel Evans*	unopposed		
Liberal hold		Swing		

=== St Clears ===
St Clears 1892
Party	Candidate	Votes	%	±%
Liberal	John Williams	270		
Liberal	John Jones	210		
Majority		60		
Liberal hold		Swing		

=== St Ishmael ===
St Ishmael 1892
Party	Candidate	Votes	%	±%
Liberal	J. Lloyd Thomas*	unopposed		
Liberal hold		Swing		

=== Trelech ===
Trelech 1892
Party	Candidate	Votes	%	±%
Liberal	John Phillips	Unopposed		
Liberal hold		Swing		

=== Whitland ===
Whitland 1892
Party	Candidate	Votes	%	±%
Liberal	Rev William Thomas*	unopposed		
Liberal win (new seat)				

== Election of Aldermen ==
In addition to the 51 councillors the council consisted of 17 county aldermen. Aldermen were elected by the council, and served a six-year term. Following the elections, the following aldermen were appointed by the newly elected council. In addition to the eight vacancies, a ninth alderman was appointed in place of the late Morgan Davies.

The following retiring aldermen were re-elected:

- J. Bagnall Evans, Liberal
- Robert Scourfield, Llansteffan, Liberal
- David Evans, Llangennech, Liberal

In addition, the following six new aldermen were elected:

- John Lewis, Meirios Hall, Liberal (defeated candidate at Llangeler)
- Gwilym Evans, Liberal (defeated candidate at Llanelli)
- D.L. Jones, Derlwyn, Liberal
- R.W. Stephens, Coedybrain, Liberal
- J.S. Tregoning, Iscoed, Conservative
- Henry Wilkins, Liberal (defeated candidate at Llanelli)

Two retiring aldermen were elected as councillors but were not re-elected as aldermen:

- Sir James Hills-Johnes, Conservative
- C.E. Morris, Liberal

Two retiring aldermen were not re-elected:

- Col. Gwynnne Hughes JP, Liberal
- D. James, Bailibedw, Liberal

== By-elections between 1892 and 1895 ==
=== Myddfai by-election, 1894 ===
George Jones, the member for Myddfai, died in March 1894. His son, J. Walter Jones, was the only candidate nominated to succeed him

Myddfai by-election, 1894
Party	Candidate	Votes	%	±%
Liberal	J. Walter Jones	Unopposed		

== Bibliography ==
- Morgan, Kenneth O. (1967). "Cardiganshire Politics: The Liberal Ascendancy 1885-1923". Ceredigion. 5 (4): 311–346.
