= Henry Jones-Davies =

Henry Jones-Davies may refer to:

- Henry Jones-Davies (cricketer) (1912–1976), English cricketer and British Army officer
- Henry Jones-Davies (farmer) (1870–1955), Welsh farmer and pioneer of agricultural co-operation
