= 1895 Carmarthenshire County Council election =

Welsh local election

All 68 seats to Carmarthenshire County Council 35 seats needed for a majority
	First party	Second party	Third party
Party	Liberal	Conservative	Liberal Unionist
Last election	55/68	9/68	1/68
Seats before	55/68	9/68	1/68
Seats won	53/68	13/68	1/68
Councillors	38	11	1
Aldermen	15	2	0
Seats +/–	▼2	▲4	▼0
	Fourth party
Party	Independent
Last election	3/68
Seats before	3/68
Seats won	1/68
Councillors	1
Aldermen	0
Seats +/–	▼2
Council control after election
Liberal
Liberal Party

The third election to the Carmarthenshire County Council was held in March 1895. It was preceded by the 1892 election and followed by the 1898 election.

== Overview of the result ==
The Liberals retained a strong majority.

== Candidates ==
37 members were returned unopposed; the vast majority of whom were Liberals. This meant the Liberals were guaranteed a majority before a single vote was cast. 22 of those elected in 1889 sought re-election.

None of the retiring aldermen sought election as councillors.

== Outcome ==
With only 14 contests out of a possible 51, the election attracted relatively little interest. Much attention was focused on Kidwelly, where the sitting member, Daniel Stephens, was narrowly defeated by the Conservative candidate. The Conservatives also won another three seats.

At Cenarth, the successful candidate was returned on the casting vote of the returning officer.

The subsequent election of Stephens as an alderman reflected some divisions in the Liberal ranks when a proposal was made that only elected members should be elevated to the aldermanic bench.

== Ward results ==
=== Abergwili ===
Abergwili 1895
Party	Candidate	Votes	%	±%
Liberal	John Lloyd*	Unopposed		
Liberal hold		Swing		

=== Bettws ===
Bettws 1895
Party	Candidate	Votes	%	±%
Liberal	William Nathaniel Jones*	Unopposed		
Liberal hold		Swing		

=== Caio ===
Caio 1895
Party	Candidate	Votes	%	±%
Conservative	Sir James Hills-Johnes*	226		
Liberal	T. Francis Jones	191		
Majority		35		
Conservative hold		Swing		

=== Carmarthen Eastern Ward (Lower Division) ===
Carmarthen Eastern Ward (Lower Division) 1895
Party	Candidate	Votes	%	±%
Liberal	Thomas Jenkins*	Unopposed		
Liberal hold		Swing		

=== Carmarthen Eastern Ward (Upper Division) ===
Carmarthen Eastern Ward (Upper Division) 1895
Party	Candidate	Votes	%	±%
Liberal	John Thomas*	Unopposed		
Liberal hold		Swing		

=== Carmarthen Western Ward (Lower Division) ===
Carmarthen Western Ward (Lower Division) 1895
Party	Candidate	Votes	%	±%
Conservative	James John	Unopposed		
Conservative hold		Swing		

=== Carmarthen Western Ward (Upper Division) ===
Carmarthen Eastern Ward (Lower Division) 1895
Party	Candidate	Votes	%	±%
Liberal	Professor D.E. Jones*	Unopposed		
Liberal hold		Swing		

=== Cenarth ===
Cenarth 1895
Party	Candidate	Votes	%	±%
Liberal	Jeremiah			
Conservative	Davies			
Majority				
Liberal hold		Swing		

=== Cilycwm ===
Cilycwm 1895
Party	Candidate	Votes	%	±%
Liberal	Rev Thomas Evans*	Unopposed		
Liberal hold		Swing		

=== Conwil ===
Conwil 1895
Party	Candidate	Votes	%	±%
Liberal	Thomas Jones	265		
Conservative	David Evan Stephens	156		
Majority		109		
Liberal hold		Swing		

=== Kidwelly ===
Kidwelly 1895
Party	Candidate	Votes	%	±%
Conservative	Holmes Stead	243		
Liberal	Daniel Stephens*	230		
Majority		13		
Conservative gain from Liberal		Swing		

=== Laugharne ===
Laugharne 1895
Party	Candidate	Votes	%	±%
Liberal	John D. Morse*	Unopposed		
Liberal hold		Swing		

=== Llanarthney ===
Llanarthney 1895
Party	Candidate	Votes	%	±%
Liberal	Henry Jones-Davies*	unopposed		
Liberal hold		Swing		

=== Llanboidy ===
Llanboidy 1895
Party	Candidate	Votes	%	±%
Liberal	Thomas Evans*	unopposed		
Liberal hold		Swing		

=== Llandebie ===
Llandebie 1895
Party	Candidate	Votes	%	±%
Liberal	Henry Herbert*	285		
Conservative	J. Price	145		
Majority		140		
Liberal hold		Swing		

=== Llandilo Rural ===
Llandilo Rural 1895
Party	Candidate	Votes	%	±%
Independent	William Jones*	320		
Liberal	W. Jones	254		
Majority		66		
Independent hold		Swing		

=== Llandilo Urban ===
Llandilo Urban 1895
Party	Candidate	Votes	%	±%
Liberal	J.W. Gwynne Hughes*	unopposed		
Liberal hold		Swing		

=== Llandovery ===
Llandovery 1895
Party	Candidate	Votes	%	±%
Conservative	Walter Powell Jeffreys*	unopposed		
Conservative hold		Swing		

=== Llanedy ===
Llanedy 1895
Party	Candidate	Votes	%	±%
Liberal	John Ll. Thomas*	unopposed		
Liberal hold		Swing		

=== Llanegwad ===
Llanegwad 1895
Party	Candidate	Votes	%	±%
Liberal	H.J. Thomas*	unopposed		
Liberal hold		Swing		

=== Llanelly Division 1 ===
Wilson had been elected as an Independent in 1892, defeating Gwilym Evans

Llanelly Division 1 1895
Party	Candidate	Votes	%	±%
Conservative	W.J. Wilson*	unopposed		
Conservative gain from Independent		Swing		

=== Llanelly Division 2 ===
Llanelly Division 2 1895
Party	Candidate	Votes	%	±%
Liberal	Joseph Mayberry*	unopposed		
Liberal hold		Swing		

=== Llanelly Division 3 ===
Llanelly Division 3 1895
Party	Candidate	Votes	%	±%
Conservative	Ernest Trubshaw*	unopposed		
Conservative hold		Swing		

=== Llanelly Division 4 ===
Llanelly Division 4 1895
Party	Candidate	Votes	%	±%
Liberal	Rev J. Evans	unopposed		
Liberal hold		Swing		

=== Llanelly Division 5 ===
Llanelly Division 5 1895
Party	Candidate	Votes	%	±%
Liberal	D.C. Parry*	unopposed		
Liberal hold		Swing		

=== Llanelly Division 6 ===
Llanelly Division 6 1895
Party	Candidate	Votes	%	±%
Liberal	Thomas Phillips*	unopposed		
Liberal hold		Swing		

=== Llanelly Division 7 ===
Llanelly Division 7 1895
Party	Candidate	Votes	%	±%
Liberal	Thomas Jones	75		
Liberal	William David	7		
Majority		68		
Liberal hold		Swing		

=== Llanelly Division 8 ===
Llanelly Division 8 1895
Party	Candidate	Votes	%	±%
Liberal	Joseph Williams	unopposed		
Liberal hold		Swing		

=== Llanelly Rural, Berwick ===
Llanelly Rural, Berwick 1895
Party	Candidate	Votes	%	±%
Liberal	Owen Bonville*	231		
Liberal	David Lewis	156		
Majority				
Liberal win (new seat)				

=== Llanelly Rural, Hengoed ===
Llanelly Rural, Hengoed 1895
Party	Candidate	Votes	%	±%
Liberal	David John*	Unopposed		
Liberal win (new seat)				

=== Llanelly Rural, Westfa and Glyn ===
Llanelly Rural, Westfa and Glyn 1895
Party	Candidate	Votes	%	±%
Liberal	Thomas Jenkins	120		
Liberal	W.B. Jones	52		
Majority		68		
Liberal win (new seat)				

=== Llanfihangel Aberbythick ===
Llanfihangel Aberbythick 1895
Party	Candidate	Votes	%	±%
Conservative	Viscount Emlyn*	Unopposed	N/A	N/A
Conservative hold				

=== Llanfihangel-ar-Arth ===
Llanfihangel-ar-Arth 1895
Party	Candidate	Votes	%	±%
Conservative	T.R. Jones	186		
Liberal	T. Barrett	173		
Majority		13		
Conservative gain from Liberal		Swing		

=== Llangadock ===
Llangadock 1895
Party	Candidate	Votes	%	±%
Liberal	Thomas Jenkins	236		
Liberal	William Davies	203		
Majority		33		
Liberal hold		Swing		

=== Llangeler ===
Llangeler 1895
Party	Candidate	Votes	%	±%
Conservative	Thomas Thomas*			
Liberal	Daniel Lewis			
Majority				
Conservative hold		Swing		

=== Llangendeirne ===
Llangendeirne 1895
Party	Candidate	Votes	%	±%
Liberal	William Harries*	unopposed		
Liberal hold		Swing		

=== Llangennech ===
Llangennech 1895
Party	Candidate	Votes	%	±%
Liberal	John Thomas*	unopposed		
Liberal hold		Swing		

=== Llangunnor ===
Llangunnor 1895
Party	Candidate	Votes	%	±%
Liberal	C.E. Morris*	unopposed		
Liberal hold		Swing		

=== Llanon ===
Llanon 1895
Party	Candidate	Votes	%	±%
Liberal	Rev W.E. Evans*	unopposed		
Liberal hold		Swing		

=== Llansawel ===
Llansawel 1895
Party	Candidate	Votes	%	±%
Conservative	Sir J.H.W. Drummond, Bart.*	Unopposed	N/A	N/A
Conservative hold				

=== Llanstephan ===
Llanstephan 1895
Party	Candidate	Votes	%	±%
Liberal	John Johns	unopposed		
Liberal gain from Liberal Unionist		Swing		

=== Llanybyther ===
Llanybyther 1895
Party	Candidate	Votes	%	±%
Liberal	John Rees	unopposed		
Liberal hold		Swing		

=== Mothvey ===
Mothvey 1895
Party	Candidate	Votes	%	±%
Liberal	J. Walter Jones*	Unopposed		
Liberal hold		Swing		

=== Pembrey North ===
Buckley, the prospective Unionist candidate for West Carmarthenshire, had been returned as an Independent Liberal in 1892.

Pembrey North 1895
Party	Candidate	Votes	%	±%
Liberal Unionist	W.J. Buckley*	unopposed		
Liberal Unionist gain from Independent Liberal		Swing		

=== Pembrey South ===
Marsh was returned as a Liberal in 1892

Pembrey South 1895
Party	Candidate	Votes	%	±%
Conservative	W.S. Marsh*	unopposed		
Conservative gain from Liberal		Swing		

=== Quarter Bach ===
Quarter Bach 1895
Party	Candidate	Votes	%	±%
Liberal	Dr Howell Rees*	unopposed		
Liberal hold		Swing		

=== Rhydcymmerai ===
Rhydcymmerai 1895
Party	Candidate	Votes	%	±%
Liberal	John Davies	181		
Conservative	M.L.Price	117		
Majority		64		
Liberal hold		Swing		

=== St Clears ===
St Clears 1895
Party	Candidate	Votes	%	±%
Liberal	John Williams*	unopposed		
Liberal hold		Swing		

=== St Ishmael ===
St Ishmael 1895
Party	Candidate	Votes	%	±%
Liberal	J. Lloyd Thomas*	unopposed		
Liberal hold		Swing		

=== Trelech ===
Trelech 1895
Party	Candidate	Votes	%	±%
Liberal	John Phillips*	Unopposed		
Liberal hold		Swing		

=== Whitland ===
Whitland 1895
Party	Candidate	Votes	%	±%
Liberal	Rev William Thomas*	unopposed		
Liberal win (new seat)				

== Election of Aldermen ==
An unsuccessful attempt was made to select aldermen from among sitting members only.

The following retiring aldermen were re-elected:

- Joseph Joseph, Liberal (retiring alderman)
- W.R. Edwards, Carmarthen, Liberal
- W.O. Brigstocke JP, Liberal (retiring alderman)
- Dr J.A. Jones, Llanelly, Liberal (retiring alderman)
- Henry Wilkins, Liberal

In addition, the following three new aldermen were elected:

- John Bevan, Llansadwrn
- Daniel Stephens, Liberal (defeated candidate at Kidwelly)
- Thomas Watkins, Tycerrig, Llandovery, Conservative

The following retiring aldermen were not re-elected

- John James, Llandovery
- David Randell MP, Liberal
- H. Nevill, Llanelli, Conservative
- T. Williams, Llwynhendy, Liberal
- D. Richards, Ammanford, Liberal
