= 1904 Carmarthenshire County Council election =

Welsh local election

All 68 seats to Carmarthenshire County Council 35 seats needed for a majority
	First party	Second party	Third party
Party	Liberal	Conservative	Liberal Unionist
Last election	54/68	12/68	1/68
Seats before	54/68	12/68	1/68
Seats won	59/68	7/68	2/68
Councillors	41	7	2
Aldermen	17	0	0
Seats +/–	▲5	▼5	▲1
	Fourth party
Party	Independent
Last election	1/68
Seats before	1/68
Seats won	0/68
Councillors	0
Aldermen	0
Seats +/–	▼1
Council control after election
Liberal
Liberal Party

The sixth election to the Carmarthenshire County Council was held in March 1904. It was preceded by the 1901 election and followed by the 1907 election.

== Overview of the result ==
The Liberals retained a strong majority with a majority of members returned unopposed. From the outset the election was dominated by the debate over the implementation of the 1902 Education Act, which was fiercely opposed by the radical wing of the Welsh Liberal Party.

== Candidates ==
The election was fought on more explicitly political lines, largely as a result of the way the education question dominated the election. Following the nominations, the Liberals already had a majority due to the number of candidates returned unopposed. These included all eight candidates in the Llanelli Urban area, including Joseph Roberts, who was returned unopposed, with the support of the local Trades and Labour Council, for the division previously represented by the veteran tinplate leader, Tom Phillips, who retired due to ill health. (Note: Joseph Roberts was the nominee of the Trades and Labour Council and was described in some sources as a Labour candidate.)

Two sitting members, Col. J.W. Gwynne Hughes of Tregib, chairman of the council and his kinsman, Colonel Gwynne Hughes of Glancothy, stood as Unionists due to the education question.

Only six of those elected at the first election, and who had served continuously since then, sought re-election. None of the retiring aldermen stood as candidates.

== Outcome ==
There were a number of changes. At Laugharne, J.D. Morse, the member since 1889, was defeated by a Conservative while the Liberals captured seats from the Conservatives at Carmarthen, Llandovery and St Clears. Colonel Gwynne Hughes of Glancothy was defeated by a Liberal at Llanegwad.

The Liberals took all nine of the vacant aldermanic seats, with both J.S. Tregoining and Sir James Hills-Johnes receiving small numbers of votes.

== Division results ==
=== Abergwili ===
Abergwili 1904
Party	Candidate	Votes	%	±%
Liberal	John Lloyd*	296		
Conservative	H.W. Pryse	125		
Majority				
Liberal hold		Swing		

=== Bettws ===
Bettws 1904
Party	Candidate	Votes	%	±%
Liberal	William Nathaniel Jones*	527		
Liberal	Tom Jones	505		
Majority				
Liberal hold		Swing		

=== Caio ===
Caio 1904
Party	Candidate	Votes	%	±%
Liberal	T. Francis Jones*	unopposed		
Liberal hold		Swing		

=== Carmarthen Eastern Ward (Lower Division) ===
Carmarthen Eastern Ward (Lower Division) 1904
Party	Candidate	Votes	%	±%
Conservative	T.E. Brigstocke*	268		
Liberal	H.W. Thomas	207		
Majority				
Conservative hold		Swing		

=== Carmarthen Eastern Ward (Upper Division) ===
Carmarthen Eastern Ward (Upper Division) 1904
Party	Candidate	Votes	%	±%
Liberal	Rev Andrew Fuller-Mills*	255		
Conservative	D. Davies	135		
Majority				
Liberal hold		Swing		

=== Carmarthen Western Ward (Lower Division) ===
Carmarthen Western Ward (Lower Division) 1904
Party	Candidate	Votes	%	±%
Liberal	John Lewis	162		
Conservative	James John*	159		
Majority		3		
Liberal gain from Conservative		Swing		

=== Carmarthen Western Ward (Upper Division) ===
Carmarthen Eastern Ward (Upper Division) 1904
Party	Candidate	Votes	%	±%
Liberal	Professor D.E. Jones*	unopposed		
Liberal hold		Swing		

=== Cenarth ===
Cenarth 1904
Party	Candidate	Votes	%	±%
Conservative	David Davies*	unopposed		
Conservative hold		Swing		

=== Cilycwm ===
Cilycwm 1904
Party	Candidate	Votes	%	±%
Liberal	James Rees*	unopposed		
Liberal hold		Swing		

=== Conwil ===
Conwil 1904
Party	Candidate	Votes	%	±%
Liberal	Thomas Jones*	unopposed		
Liberal hold		Swing		

=== Kidwelly ===
Kidwelly 1904
Party	Candidate	Votes	%	±%
Conservative	Alfred Stephens*	unopposed		
Conservative hold		Swing		

=== Laugharne ===
Laugharne 1904
Party	Candidate	Votes	%	±%
Unionist	Richard Evans	185		
Liberal	John D. Morse*	152		
Majority		33		
Unionist gain from Liberal		Swing		

=== Llanarthney ===
Llanarthney 1904
Party	Candidate	Votes	%	±%
Liberal	Henry Jones-Davies*	unopposed		
Liberal hold		Swing		

=== Llanboidy ===
David Thomas had been elected as a Conservative in 1901.

Llanboidy 1904
Party	Candidate	Votes	%	±%
Liberal	David Thomas*	unopposed		
Liberal hold		Swing		

=== Llandebie ===
Llandebie 1904
Party	Candidate	Votes	%	±%
Liberal	David Davies*	unopposed		
Liberal hold		Swing		

=== Llandilo Rural ===
William Jones had been elected as an Independent at previous elections.

Llandilo Rural 1904
Party	Candidate	Votes	%	±%
Liberal	William Jones*	unopposed		
Liberal gain from Independent		Swing		

=== Llandilo Urban ===
Gwynne Hughes had previously sat as a Liberal.

Llandilo Urban 1904
Party	Candidate	Votes	%	±%
Unionist	J.W. Gwynne Hughes*	unopposed		
Unionist gain from Liberal		Swing		

=== Llandovery ===
Llandovery 1904
Party	Candidate	Votes	%	±%
Liberal	J.R. James	193		
Conservative	Walter Powell Jeffreys*	105		
Majority				
Liberal gain from Conservative		Swing		

=== Llanedy ===
Llanedy 1904
Party	Candidate	Votes	%	±%
Liberal	John Ll. Thomas*	280		
Conservative	R.H. Sampson	210		
Majority		70		
Liberal hold		Swing		

=== Llanegwad ===
Gwynne Hughes had previously sat as a Liberal and failed to defend the seat as a Unionist.

Llanegwad 1904
Party	Candidate	Votes	%	±%
Liberal	D.J. Harries	257		
Unionist	Col. W. Gwynne Hughes*	210		
Majority				
Liberal gain from Unionist		Swing		

=== Llanelly Division 1 ===
Llanelly Division 1 1904
Party	Candidate	Votes	%	±%
Unionist	W. Griffiths	unopposed		
Unionist hold		Swing		

=== Llanelly Division 2 ===
Llanelly Division 2 1904
Party	Candidate	Votes	%	±%
Liberal	W. Williams	unopposed		
Liberal hold		Swing		

=== Llanelly Division 3 ===
Llanelly Division.3 1904
Party	Candidate	Votes	%	±%
Liberal	William David*	unopposed		
Liberal hold		Swing		

=== Llanelly Division 4 ===
Llanelly Division 4 1904
Party	Candidate	Votes	%	±%
Liberal	Rev Thomas Johns*	Unopposed	N/A	N/A
Liberal hold				

=== Llanelly Division 5 ===
Llanelly Division 5 1904
Party	Candidate	Votes	%	±%
Liberal	D.C. Parry*	unopposed		
Liberal hold		Swing		

=== Llanelly Division 6 ===
Llanelly Division 6 1904
Party	Candidate	Votes	%	±%
Liberal	Joseph Roberts	Unopposed		
Majority				
Liberal hold		Swing		

=== Llanelly Division 7 ===
Llanelly Division 7 1904
Party	Candidate	Votes	%	±%
Liberal	Thomas Jones*	unopposed		
Liberal hold		Swing		

=== Llanelly Division 8 ===
Llanelly Division 8 1904
Party	Candidate	Votes	%	±%
Liberal	Joseph Williams*	unopposed		
Liberal hold		Swing		

=== Llanelly Rural, Berwick ===
Llanelly Rural, Berwick 1904
Party	Candidate	Votes	%	±%
Liberal	D. Harry	unopposed		
Liberal hold		Swing		

=== Llanelly Rural, Hengoed ===
Llanelly Rural, Hengoed 1904
Party	Candidate	Votes	%	±%
Liberal	David John*	unopposed		
Liberal hold		Swing		

=== Llanelly Rural, Westfa and Glyn ===
Llanelly Rural, Westfa and Glyn 1904
Party	Candidate	Votes	%	±%
Liberal	Rev B. Humphreys	293		
Liberal	Rev John Evans	129		
Liberal hold		Swing		

=== Llanfihangel Aberbythick ===
Llanfihangel Aberbythick 1904
Party	Candidate	Votes	%	±%
Conservative	Earl Cawdor*	Unopposed	N/A	N/A
Conservative hold				

=== Llanfihangel-ar-Arth ===
Llanfihangel-ar-Arth 1904
Party	Candidate	Votes	%	±%
Liberal	Thomas Barrett*	unopposed		
Liberal hold		Swing		

=== Llangadock ===
Llangadock 1904
Party	Candidate	Votes	%	±%
Liberal	William Davies*	unopposed		
Liberal hold		Swing		

=== Llangeler ===
Llangeler 1904
Party	Candidate	Votes	%	±%
Conservative	Colonel W.P. Lewes*	unopposed		
Conservative hold		Swing		

=== Llangendeirne ===
Llangendeirne 1904
Party	Candidate	Votes	%	±%
Liberal	William Jenkins*	unopposed		
Liberal hold		Swing		

=== Llangennech ===
Llangennech 1904
Party	Candidate	Votes	%	±%
Liberal	T. Thomas	unopposed		
Liberal hold		Swing		

=== Llangunnor ===
Llangunnor 1904
Party	Candidate	Votes	%	±%
Liberal	C.E. Morris*	182		
Conservative	David Evan Stephens	160		
Liberal hold		Swing		

=== Llanon ===
Llanon 1904
Party	Candidate	Votes	%	±%
Liberal	Morgan Jones*	unopposed		
Liberal hold		Swing		

=== Llansawel ===
Llansawel 1904
Party	Candidate	Votes	%	±%
Conservative	Sir J.H.W. Drummond, Bart.*	Unopposed	N/A	N/A
Conservative hold				

=== Llanstephan ===
Llanstephan 1904
Party	Candidate	Votes	%	±%
Liberal	John Johns*	unopposed		
Liberal hold		Swing		

=== Llanybyther ===
Williams was one of two Liberal candidates in 1901 when both polled the same number of votes and Williams lost on the toss of a coin.

Llanybyther 1904
Party	Candidate	Votes	%	±%
Liberal	J. Thomas	266		
Conservative	David Williams	234		
Majority		32		
Liberal hold		Swing		

=== Mothvey ===
Mothvey 1904
Party	Candidate	Votes	%	±%
Liberal	David Davies*	unopposed		
Liberal hold		Swing		

=== Pembrey North ===
Pembrey North 1904
Party	Candidate	Votes	%	±%
Liberal	Rev J.H. Rees*	272		
Liberal	Dr J.H. Williams	174		
Unionist	Rev W.G. Williams	129		
Liberal hold		Swing		

=== Pembrey South ===
This ward was not recorded in the local press.

Pembrey South 1901
Party	Candidate	Votes	%	±%
Conservative	Thomas F. Wilkins	391		
	John G. Thomas	148		
Conservative hold		Swing		

=== Quarter Bach ===
Quarter Bach 1904
Party	Candidate	Votes	%	±%
Liberal	W.J. Williams	296		
Liberal	Gwilym Vaughan	289		
Liberal hold		Swing		

=== Rhydcymmerai ===
Rhydcymmerai 1904
Party	Candidate	Votes	%	±%
Liberal	Benjamin Evans*	unopposed		
Liberal hold		Swing		

=== St Clears ===
Dr Thomas had sat as a Conservative but was said to have fought this election as a 'radical'.

St Clears 1904
Party	Candidate	Votes	%	±%
Liberal	J. Lewis	253		
Liberal	Dr R.L. Thomas*	182		
Independent	Capt. D.J. Powell	28		
Liberal gain from Conservative		Swing		

=== St Ishmael ===
St Ishmael 1904
Party	Candidate	Votes	%	±%
Liberal	John Lloyd Thomas*	unopposed		
Liberal hold		Swing		

=== Trelech ===
Trelech 1904
Party	Candidate	Votes	%	±%
Liberal	W. Thomas	unopposed		
Liberal hold		Swing		

=== Whitland ===
Whitland 1904
Party	Candidate	Votes	%	±%
Liberal	J. Scourfield*	unopposed		
Liberal hold		Swing		

== Election of aldermen ==
In addition to the 51 councillors the council consisted of 17 county aldermen. Aldermen were elected by the council, and served a six-year term. Following the elections the following nine aldermen were elected (with the number of votes recorded in each case).

The following retiring aldermen were re-elected:

- John Williams, retiring alderman (47)
- John Lewis, retiring alderman (45)
- D.L. Jones, retiring alderman (42)
- R.W. Stephens, retiring alderman (48)
- John Rees, retiring alderman (42)
- Rev William Davies, retiring alderman (42)

In addition, two new aldermen were elected:

- W.N. Jones, elected member for Betws (46)
- Thomas Jones, elected member for Llanelli Ward 7 (42)
- Rev Thomas Johns, elected member for Llanelli Ward 4 (42

Four retiring aldermen were not re-elected:

- J.S. Tregoning, Iscoed, Conservative
- Rev. W. Thomas, Whitland, Liberal
- David Evans, Llangennech, Liberal
- James Hill-Johnes, Dolaucothy, Conservative

All the elected aldermen were supported by the majority of members.

== By-elections between 1904 and 1907 ==
=== Betws by-election 1904 ===
A by-election was held on 23 April due to the elevation of W.N. Jones to the aldermanic bench. The Rev. Towyn Jones, Garnant, consented to stand after two public meetings at Ammanford and in Cwmamman and was expected to be returned unopposed. However, he was opposed by David John Jones, an Ammanford ironmonger and a prominent Congregationalist, who refused to withdraw. After a contest between two Liberals which involved the local MP, Abel Thomas, Towyn Jones was elected by a relatively comfortable majority.

Betws by-election 1904
Party	Candidate	Votes	%	±%
Liberal	J. Towyn Jones	611		
Liberal	David John Jones	416		
Majority		195		
Turnout				
Liberal hold		Swing		
