= 1898 Carmarthenshire County Council election =

Welsh local election

All 68 seats to Carmarthenshire County Council 35 seats needed for a majority
	First party	Second party	Third party
Party	Liberal	Conservative	Liberal Unionist
Last election	53/68	13/68	1/68
Seats before	53/68	13/68	1/68
Seats won	51/68	15/68	1/68
Councillors	37	12	1
Aldermen	14	3	0
Seats +/–	▼2	▲2	▼0
	Fourth party
Party	Independent
Last election	1/68
Seats before	1/68
Seats won	1/68
Councillors	1
Aldermen	0
Seats +/–	▼o
Council control after election
Liberal
Liberal Party

The fourth election to the Carmarthenshire County Council was held in March 1898. It was preceded by the 1895 election and followed by the 1901 election.

== Overview of the result ==
The Liberal Party once again retained a strong majority.

== Candidates ==
42 candidates were returned unopposed, with only nine seats being contested, and several of these were between rival Liberal candidates. This was the highest number of uncontested seats since the council was created. Fourteen of those elected at the first election, and who had served continuously since then, sought re-election

Of the retiring aldermen, only Gwilym Evans, former chairman of the council, sought election. He had been defeated for a Llanelli ward in 1892 but was now returned unopposed for a different ward.

== Outcome ==
Although the number of contested elections was small, a number of wards were keenly contested.

There were notable Liberal victories at Caio, where Sir James Hills-Johnes was defeated, and at Pembrey, where W.J. Buckley lost to the Liberal candidate David Evans. Buckley had been a member since 1889 and was parliamentary candidate for West Carmarthenshire.

The Conservatives, in turn, gained ground by winning a number of seats including St Clears and Llanboidy. In Llanelli, John Allen Williams, editor of the Llanelly Guardian, was returned unopposed as a Liberal Unionist.

Seven of the aldermanic seats were occupied by Liberals with the newly elected aldermen including Sir James Hills-Johnes and John Williams, both of whom had been defeated at the polls. Two Conservatives were elected as aldermen, a net gan of one on the aldermanic bench.

== Ward results ==
=== Abergwili ===
Abergwili 1898
Party	Candidate	Votes	%	±%
Liberal	John Lloyd*	Unopposed		
Liberal hold		Swing		

=== Bettws ===
Bettws 1898
Party	Candidate	Votes	%	±%
Liberal	William Nathaniel Jones*	Unopposed		
Liberal hold		Swing		

=== Caio ===
Caio 1898
Party	Candidate	Votes	%	±%
Liberal	T. Francis Jones	217		
Conservative	Sir James Hills-Johnes*	201		
Majority		16		N/A
Liberal gain from Conservative		Swing		

=== Carmarthen Eastern Ward (Lower Division) ===
Carmarthen Eastern Ward (Lower Division) 1898
Party	Candidate	Votes	%	±%
Conservative	T.E. Brigstocke	Unopposed		
Conservative gain from Liberal		Swing		

=== Carmarthen Eastern Ward (Upper Division) ===
Carmarthen Eastern Ward (Upper Division) 1898
Party	Candidate	Votes	%	±%
Liberal	John Thomas*	Unopposed		
Liberal hold		Swing		

=== Carmarthen Western Ward (Lower Division) ===
Carmarthen Western Ward (Lower Division) 1898
Party	Candidate	Votes	%	±%
Conservative	James John	Unopposed		
Conservative hold		Swing		

=== Carmarthen Western Ward (Upper Division) ===
Carmarthen Eastern Ward (Upper Division) 1898
Party	Candidate	Votes	%	±%
Liberal	Professor D.E. Jones*	Unopposed		
Liberal hold		Swing		

=== Cenarth ===
Cenarth 1898
Party	Candidate	Votes	%	±%
Conservative	David Davies	258		
Liberal	D.D. Walters	163		
Majority		95		
Conservative gain from Liberal		Swing		

=== Cilycwm ===
Cilycwm 1898
Party	Candidate	Votes	%	±%
Liberal		unopposed		
Liberal hold		Swing		

=== Conwil ===
Conwil 1898
Party	Candidate	Votes	%	±%
Liberal	Thomas Jones	Unopposed		
Liberal hold		Swing		

=== Kidwelly ===
Kidwelly 1898
Party	Candidate	Votes	%	±%
Conservative	Alfred Stephens	Unopposed		
Conservative hold		Swing		

=== Laugharne ===
Laugharne 1898
Party	Candidate	Votes	%	±%
Liberal	John D. Morse*	Unopposed		
Liberal hold		Swing		

=== Llanarthney ===
Llanarthney 1898
Party	Candidate	Votes	%	±%
Liberal	Henry Jones-Davies*	Unopposed		
Liberal hold		Swing		

=== Llanboidy ===
Llanboidy 1898
Party	Candidate	Votes	%	±%
Conservative	David Thomas	298		
Liberal	Thomas Evans*	248		
Majority		50		
Conservative gain from Liberal		Swing		

=== Llandebie ===
Llandebie 1898
Party	Candidate	Votes	%	±%
Liberal				
Liberal hold		Swing		

=== Llandilo Rural ===
Llandilo Rural 1898
Party	Candidate	Votes	%	±%
Independent	William Jones*	Unopposed		
Independent hold		Swing		

=== Llandilo Urban ===
Llandilo Urban 1898
Party	Candidate	Votes	%	±%
Liberal	J.W. Gwynne Hughes*	Unopposed		
Liberal hold		Swing		

=== Llandovery ===
Llandovery 1898
Party	Candidate	Votes	%	±%
Conservative	Walter Powell Jeffreys*	Unopposed		
Conservative hold		Swing		

=== Llanedy ===
Llanedy 1898
Party	Candidate	Votes	%	±%
Liberal	John Ll. Thomas*	Unopposed		
Liberal hold		Swing		

=== Llanegwad ===
Llanegwad 1898
Party	Candidate	Votes	%	±%
Liberal		unopposed		
Liberal hold		Swing		

=== Llanelly Division 1 ===
Llanelly Division 1 1898
Party	Candidate	Votes	%	±%
Liberal Unionist	J. Allen Williams	unopposed		
Liberal Unionist gain from Conservative		Swing		

=== Llanelly Division 2 ===
Llanelly Division 2 1898
Party	Candidate	Votes	%	±%
Liberal	Joseph Mayberry*	unopposed		
Liberal hold		Swing		

=== Llanelly Division 3 ===
Llanelly Division 3 1898
Party	Candidate	Votes	%	±%
Liberal	William David	unopposed		
Liberal gain from Conservative		Swing		

=== Llanelly Division 4 ===
Llanelly Division 4 1898
Party	Candidate	Votes	%	±%
Liberal	Rev Thomas Johns*	Unopposed	N/A	N/A
Liberal hold				

=== Llanelly Division 5 ===
Llanelly Division 5 1898
Party	Candidate	Votes	%	±%
Liberal	D.C. Parry*	222		
Liberal	D. Rees Edmunds	114		
Majority		108		
Liberal hold		Swing		

=== Llanelly Division 6 ===
Llanelly Division 6 1898
Party	Candidate	Votes	%	±%
Liberal	Thomas Phillips*	147		
Liberal	T. Williams	135		
Liberal	J. Auckland	102		
Majority		12		
Liberal hold		Swing		

=== Llanelly Division 7 ===
Llanelly Division 7 1898
Party	Candidate	Votes	%	±%
Liberal	Thomas Jones	unopposed		
Liberal hold		Swing		

=== Llanelly Division 8 ===
Llanelly Division 8 1898
Party	Candidate	Votes	%	±%
Liberal	Joseph Williams*	unopposed		
Liberal hold		Swing		

=== Llanelly Rural, Berwick ===
Llanelly Rural, Berwick 1898
Party	Candidate	Votes	%	±%
Liberal	Owen Bonville*	unopposed		
Liberal hold		Swing		

=== Llanelly Rural, Hengoed ===
Llanelly Rural, Hengoed 1898
Party	Candidate	Votes	%	±%
Liberal	David John*	unopposed		
Liberal hold		Swing		

=== Llanelly Rural, Westfa and Glyn ===
Llanelly Rural, Westfa and Glyn 1898
Party	Candidate	Votes	%	±%
Liberal	Gwilym Evans**	unopposed		
Liberal hold		Swing		

=== Llanfihangel Aberbythick ===
Llanfihangel Aberbythick 1898
Party	Candidate	Votes	%	±%
Conservative	Viscount Emlyn*	Unopposed	N/A	N/A
Conservative hold				

=== Llanfihangel-ar-Arth ===
Llanfihangel-ar-Arth 1898
Party	Candidate	Votes	%	±%
Conservative	Thomas Rees Jones	unopposed		
Conservative hold		Swing		

=== Llangadock ===
Llangadock 1898
Party	Candidate	Votes	%	±%
Liberal	William Davies	unopposed		
Liberal hold		Swing		

=== Llangeler ===
Llangeler 1898
Party	Candidate	Votes	%	±%
Conservative	Colonel W.P. Lewes	unopposed		
Conservative hold		Swing		

=== Llangendeirne ===
Llangendeirne 1898
Party	Candidate	Votes	%	±%
Liberal	William Jenkins	159		
Liberal	John Jenkins	126		
Majority		33		
Liberal hold		Swing		

=== Llangennech ===
Llangennech 1898
Party	Candidate	Votes	%	±%
Liberal	John Thomas	unopposed		
Liberal hold		Swing		

=== Llangunnor ===
Llangunnor 1898
Party	Candidate	Votes	%	±%
Liberal	C.E. Morris*	unopposed		
Liberal hold		Swing		

=== Llanon ===
Llanon 1898
Party	Candidate	Votes	%	±%
Liberal	Morgan Jones	unopposed		
Liberal hold		Swing		

=== Llansawel ===
Llansawel 1898
Party	Candidate	Votes	%	±%
Conservative	Sir J.H.W. Drummond, Bart.*	Unopposed	N/A	N/A
Conservative hold				

=== Llanstephan ===
Llanstephan 1898
Party	Candidate	Votes	%	±%
Liberal	John Johns	177		
Liberal	D.W. Lewis	114		
	William Williams	80		
Majority		63		
Liberal hold		Swing		

=== Llanybyther ===
Llanybyther 1898
Party	Candidate	Votes	%	±%
Liberal		unopposed		
Liberal hold		Swing		

=== Mothvey ===
Mothvey 1898
Party	Candidate	Votes	%	±%
Liberal		unopposed		
Liberal hold		Swing		

=== Pembrey North ===
Pembrey North 1898
Party	Candidate	Votes	%	±%
Liberal	David Evans	336		
Liberal Unionist	W.J. Buckley*	213		
Majority		123		
Liberal gain from Liberal Unionist		Swing		

=== Pembrey South ===
Pembrey South 1898
Party	Candidate	Votes	%	±%
Conservative	W.S. Marsh*	unopposed		
Conservative hold		Swing		

=== Quarter Bach ===
Quarter Bach 1898
Party	Candidate	Votes	%	±%
Liberal	Dr Howell Rees*	unopposed		
Liberal hold		Swing		

=== Rhydcymmerai ===
Rhydcymmerai 1898
Party	Candidate	Votes	%	±%
Liberal		unopposed		
Liberal hold		Swing		

=== St Clears ===
St Clears 1895
Party	Candidate	Votes	%	±%
Conservative	Dr R.L. Thomas	253		
Liberal	John Williams*	246		
Majority		7		
Conservative gain from Liberal		Swing		

=== St Ishmael ===
St Ishmael 1898
Party	Candidate	Votes	%	±%
Liberal	John Lloyd Thomas*	unopposed		
Liberal hold		Swing		

=== Trelech ===
Trelech 1898
Party	Candidate	Votes	%	±%
Liberal	John Phillips*	Unopposed		
Liberal hold		Swing		

=== Whitland ===
Whitland 1898
Party	Candidate	Votes	%	±%
Liberal	Rev William Thomas*	unopposed		
Liberal win (new seat)				

== Election of Aldermen ==
In addition to the 51 councillors the council consisted of 17 county aldermen. Aldermen were elected by the council, and served a six-year term. Following the elections, the following aldermen were appointed by the newly elected council.

The following retiring aldermen were re-elected:

- J.S. Tregoning, Iscoed, Conservative (retiring alderman) 43
- John Lewis, Meirios Hall, Liberal (retiring alderman) 42
- D.L. Jones, Derlwyn, Liberal (retiring alderman) 42
- R.W. Stephens, Coedybrain, Liberal (retiring alderman) 41
- David Evans, Llangennech, Liberal (retiring alderman)38

In addition, the following four new aldermen were elected:

- Rev. William Davies, Llandilo, Liberal 38
- James Hill-Johnes, Dolaucothy, Conservative (defeated candidate at Caio) 35
- Rev. W. Thomas, Whitland, Liberal (elected member for Whitland) 38
- John Williams, Llanginning, Liberal 35 (defeated candidate at St Clears)

One retiring alderman was elected as councillor but not re-elected as alderman:

- Gwilym Evans, Liberal

Two aldermen were not re-elected

- J. Bagnall Evans, Liberal
- Robert Scourfield, Llansteffan, Liberal
