= 1901 Carmarthenshire County Council election =

Welsh local election

All 68 seats to Carmarthenshire County Council 35 seats needed for a majority
	First party	Second party	Third party
Party	Liberal	Conservative	Liberal Unionist
Last election	51/68	15/68	1/68
Seats before	53/68	15/68	1/68
Seats won	54/68	12/68	1/68
Councillors	39	10	1
Aldermen	15	2	0
Seats +/–	▲1	▼3	▼0
	Fourth party
Party	Independent
Last election	1/68
Seats before	1/68
Seats won	1/68
Councillors	1
Aldermen	0
Seats +/–	▼o
Council control after election
Liberal
Liberal Party

The fifth election to the Carmarthenshire County Council was held in March 1901. It was preceded by the 1898 election and followed by the 1904 election.

== Overview of the result ==
The Liberals retained a strong majority. With a few exceptions, members were returned unopposed.

== Candidates ==
Only six seats were contested. Eleven of those elected at the first election, and who had served continuously since then, sought re-election.

None of the retiring aldermen sought election as candidates. There was also a vacancy following the death of W.O. Brigstocke, Blaenpant.

== Outcome ==
An uneventful election saw little change in the political composition of the council. The Liberals gained two seats when their candidates were returned unopposed at Llangeler and in one of the Llanelli wards after Conservative councillors stood down.

At the annual meeting, the six retiring aldermen were supported by the majority of members but there was no unanimity on replacement for Henry Wilkins, who stood down, and W.O. Brigstocke, who had died in office. W.N. Jones polled 26 votes, only three fewer than the eighth candidate, Augustus Brigstocke. However, all eight were Liberals, leaving the Conservatives with only two seats on the aldermanic bench.

== Ward results ==
=== Abergwili ===
Abergwili 1901
Party	Candidate	Votes	%	±%
Liberal	John Lloyd*	unopposed		
Liberal hold		Swing		

=== Bettws ===
Bettws 1901
Party	Candidate	Votes	%	±%
Liberal	William Nathaniel Jones*	Unopposed	N/A	N/A
Liberal hold				

=== Caio ===
Caio 1901
Party	Candidate	Votes	%	±%
Liberal	T. Francis Jones*	unopposed		
Liberal hold		Swing		

=== Carmarthen Eastern Ward (Lower Division) ===
Carmarthen Eastern Ward (Lower Division) 1901
Party	Candidate	Votes	%	±%
Conservative	T.E. Brigstocke*	unopposed		
Conservative hold		Swing		

=== Carmarthen Eastern Ward (Upper Division) ===
Carmarthen Eastern Ward (Upper Division) 1901
Party	Candidate	Votes	%	±%
Liberal	Rev Andrew Fuller-Mills	Unopposed		
Liberal hold		Swing		

=== Carmarthen Western Ward (Lower Division) ===
Carmarthen Western Ward (Lower Division) 1901
Party	Candidate	Votes	%	±%
Conservative	James John*	unopposed		
Conservative hold		Swing		

=== Carmarthen Western Ward (Upper Division) ===
Carmarthen Eastern Ward (Upper Division) 1901
Party	Candidate	Votes	%	±%
Liberal	Professor D.E. Jones*	unopposed		
Liberal hold		Swing		

=== Cenarth ===
Cenarth 1901
Party	Candidate	Votes	%	±%
Conservative	David Davies*	unopposed		
Conservative hold		Swing		

=== Cilycwm ===
Cilycwm 1901
Party	Candidate	Votes	%	±%
Liberal	James Rees*	unopposed		
Liberal hold		Swing		

=== Conwil ===
Conwil 1901
Party	Candidate	Votes	%	±%
Liberal	Thomas Jones*	unopposed		
Liberal hold		Swing		

=== Kidwelly ===
Kidwelly 1901
Party	Candidate	Votes	%	±%
Conservative	Alfred Stephens*	301		
Liberal	W. Young	176		
Majority		125		
Conservative hold		Swing		

=== Laugharne ===
Laugharne 1901
Party	Candidate	Votes	%	±%
Liberal	John D. Morse*	188		
Liberal	Richard Evans	103		
Majority		85		
Liberal hold		Swing		

=== Llanarthney ===
Llanarthney 1901
Party	Candidate	Votes	%	±%
Liberal	Henry Jones-Davies*	unopposed		
Liberal hold		Swing		

=== Llanboidy ===
Llanboidy 1901
Party	Candidate	Votes	%	±%
Conservative	David Thomas*	unopposed		
Conservative hold		Swing		

=== Llandebie ===
Llandebie 1901
Party	Candidate	Votes	%	±%
Liberal	David Davies*	unopposed		
Liberal hold		Swing		

=== Llandilo Rural ===
Llandilo Rural 1901
Party	Candidate	Votes	%	±%
Independent	William Jones*	unopposed		
Independent hold		Swing		

=== Llandilo Urban ===
Llandilo Urban 1901
Party	Candidate	Votes	%	±%
Liberal	J.W. Gwynne Hughes*	unopposed		
Liberal hold		Swing		

=== Llandovery ===
Llandovery 1901
Party	Candidate	Votes	%	±%
Conservative	Walter Powell Jeffreys*	unopposed		
Conservative hold		Swing		

=== Llanedy ===
Llanedy 1898
Party	Candidate	Votes	%	±%
Liberal	John Ll. Thomas*	240		
Conservative	David White	201		
Majority		39		
Liberal hold		Swing		

=== Llanegwad ===
Llanegwad 1901
Party	Candidate	Votes	%	±%
Liberal	Col. W. Gwynne Hughes*	unopposed		
Liberal hold		Swing		

=== Llanelly Division 1 ===
Llanelly Division 1 1901
Party	Candidate	Votes	%	±%
Liberal Unionist	J. Allen Williams*	unopposed		
Liberal Unionist hold		Swing		

=== Llanelly Division 2 ===
Llanelly Division 2 1901
Party	Candidate	Votes	%	±%
Liberal	Joseph Mayberry*	unopposed		
Liberal hold		Swing		

=== Llanelly Division 3 ===
Llanelly Division.3 1901
Party	Candidate	Votes	%	±%
Liberal	William David*	unopposed		
Liberal gain from Conservative		Swing		

=== Llanelly Division 4 ===
Llanelly Division 4 1901
Party	Candidate	Votes	%	±%
Liberal	Rev Thomas Johns*	Unopposed	N/A	N/A
Liberal hold				

=== Llanelly Division 5 ===
Llanelly Division 5 1901
Party	Candidate	Votes	%	±%
Liberal	D.C. Parry*	unopposed		
Liberal hold		Swing		

=== Llanelly Division 6 ===
Llanelly Division 6 1901
Party	Candidate	Votes	%	±%
Liberal	Thomas Phillips*	279		
Labour	Frank Vivian	154		
Majority		125		
Liberal hold		Swing		

=== Llanelly Division 7 ===
Llanelly Division 7 1901
Party	Candidate	Votes	%	±%
Liberal	Thomas Jones*	unopposed		
Liberal hold		Swing		

=== Llanelly Division 8 ===
Llanelly Division 8 1901
Party	Candidate	Votes	%	±%
Liberal	Joseph Williams*	unopposed		
Liberal hold		Swing		

=== Llanelly Rural, Berwick ===
Llanelly Rural, Berwick 1901
Party	Candidate	Votes	%	±%
Liberal	Owen Bonville*	unopposed		
Liberal hold		Swing		

=== Llanelly Rural, Hengoed ===
Llanelly Rural, Hengoed 1901
Party	Candidate	Votes	%	±%
Liberal	David John*	unopposed		
Liberal hold		Swing		

=== Llanelly Rural, Westfa and Glyn ===
Llanelly Rural, Westfa and Glyn 1901
Party	Candidate	Votes	%	±%
Liberal	Gwilym Evans*	unopposed		
Liberal hold		Swing		

=== Llanfihangel Aberbythick ===
Llanfihangel Aberbythick 1901
Party	Candidate	Votes	%	±%
Conservative	Earl Cawdor*	Unopposed	N/A	N/A
Conservative hold				

=== Llanfihangel-ar-Arth ===
Llanfihangel-ar-Arth 1901
Party	Candidate	Votes	%	±%
Liberal	T. Barrett	unopposed		
Liberal gain from Conservative		Swing		

=== Llangadock ===
Llangadock 1901
Party	Candidate	Votes	%	±%
Liberal	William Davies*	unopposed		
Liberal hold		Swing		

=== Llangeler ===
Llangeler 1901
Party	Candidate	Votes	%	±%
Conservative	Colonel W.P. Lewes*	unopposed		
Conservative hold		Swing		

=== Llangendeirne ===
Llangendeirne 1901
Party	Candidate	Votes	%	±%
Liberal	William Jenkins*	unopposed		
Liberal hold		Swing		

=== Llangennech ===
Llangennech 1901
Party	Candidate	Votes	%	±%
Liberal	J.B. Rees	unopposed		
Liberal hold		Swing		

=== Llangunnor ===
Llangunnor 1901
Party	Candidate	Votes	%	±%
Liberal	C.E. Morris*	unopposed		
Liberal hold		Swing		

=== Llanon ===
Llanon 1901
Party	Candidate	Votes	%	±%
Liberal	Morgan Jones*	unopposed		
Liberal hold		Swing		

=== Llansawel ===
Llansawel 1901
Party	Candidate	Votes	%	±%
Conservative	Sir J.H.W. Drummond, Bart.*	Unopposed	N/A	N/A
Conservative hold				

=== Llanstephan ===
Llanstephan 1901
Party	Candidate	Votes	%	±%
Liberal	John Johns*	unopposed		
Liberal hold		Swing		

=== Llanybyther ===
Both candidates received the same number of votes so the contest was decided upon the toss of a coin.

Llanybyther 1901
Party	Candidate	Votes	%	±%
Liberal	John Rees*	232		
Liberal	David Williams	232		
Majority		0		
Liberal hold		Swing		

=== Mothvey ===
Mothvey 1901
Party	Candidate	Votes	%	±%
Liberal	David Davies*	unopposed		
Liberal hold		Swing		

=== Pembrey North ===
Pembrey North 1901
Party	Candidate	Votes	%	±%
Liberal	Rev J.H. Rees*	unopposed		
Liberal hold		Swing		

=== Pembrey South ===
It was a reflection of the largely non-political character of the 1901 county election in Carmarthenshire (with the vast majority being elected unopposed) that the political affiliation of the two candidates for this ward was not recorded in the local press.

Pembrey South 1901
Party	Candidate	Votes	%	±%
Liberal	Thomas F. Wilkins	391		
Conservative	John G. Thomas	148		
Liberal gain from Conservative		Swing		

=== Quarter Bach ===
Quarter Bach 1901
Party	Candidate	Votes	%	±%
Liberal	Dr Howell Rees*	unopposed		
Liberal hold		Swing		

=== Rhydcymmerai ===
Rhydcymmerai 1901
Party	Candidate	Votes	%	±%
Liberal	Benjamin Evans*	unopposed		
Liberal hold		Swing		

=== St Clears ===
St Clears 1901
Party	Candidate	Votes	%	±%
Conservative	Dr R.L. Thomas	unopposed		
Conservative hold		Swing		

=== St Ishmael ===
St Ishmael 1901
Party	Candidate	Votes	%	±%
Liberal	John Lloyd Thomas*	unopposed		
Liberal hold		Swing		

=== Trelech ===
Trelech 1901
Party	Candidate	Votes	%	±%
Liberal	John Phillips*	Unopposed		
Liberal hold				

=== Whitland ===
Whitland 1901
Party	Candidate	Votes	%	±%
Liberal	Rev William Thomas*	unopposed		
Liberal hold		Swing		

== Election of Aldermen ==
In addition to the 51 councillors the council consisted of 17 county aldermen. Aldermen were elected by the council, and served a six-year term. Following the elections the following eight aldermen were elected (with the number of votes recorded in each case).

The following retiring aldermen were re-elected:

- John Bevan, retiring alderman (48)
- Joseph Joseph, retiring alderman (45)
- Sir Lewis Morris, retiring alderman (44)
- Daniel Stephens, retiring alderman (45)
- H J Thomas, retiring alderman (48)
- Thomas Watkins, retiring alderman (44)

In addition, two new aldermen were elected:

- Joseph Mayberry, elected member for Llanelli Ward 2 (34)
- Augustus Brigstocke, from outside the Council (29)

One retiring aldermen was not re-elected

- Henry Wilkins, Llanelli
