= 1907 Carmarthenshire County Council election =

Welsh local election

All 70 seats to Carmarthenshire County Council 36 seats needed for a majority
	First party	Second party	Third party
Party	Liberal	Conservative	Labour
Last election	59/68	7/68	0/68
Seats before	59/68	7/68	1/68
Seats won	55/70	6/70	3/70
Councillors	38	6	3
Aldermen	17	0	0
Seats +/–	▼4	▼1	▲3
	Fourth party	Fifth party
Party	Liberal Unionist	Independent
Last election	2/68	0/68
Seats before	2/68	0/68
Seats won	0/70	1/70
Councillors	0	6
Aldermen	0	0
Seats +/–	▼2	▲6
Council control after election
Liberal
Liberal Party

The seventh election to the Carmarthenshire County Council was held in March 1907. It was preceded by the 1904 election and followed by the 1910 election.

== Overview of the result ==
The Conservatives made a conscious attempt to contest far more seats than at recent elections in an election dominated by ongoing disputes over disestablishment. However, the Liberals retained a strong majority and many sitting members were returned unopposed.

== Boundary changes ==
There were minor boundary changes leading to the creation of two additional wards, namely Ammanford and Llandissilio. The new Ammanford ward, which comprised the urban district of Ammanford was created by the division of the Bettws Ward into two. Significant population growth had taken place in the eastern part of the county as a result of the growth of the anthracite coal trade but demands for further additional wards to be formed in the Llanelli district were rejected. The second new ward was at Llandissilio in the western part of the county, on the Pembrokeshire border. It was formed out of portions of the existing Whitland and Llanboidy wards. There was less unanimity in favour of the new Llandissilio ward than was the case at Ammanford, and there were suggestions that an additional rural ward was being created to counterbalance the new industrial ward at Ammanford. A proposal for a third new ward, at Newchurch on the outskirts of Carmarthen was rejected in due course.

As a result of these boundary changes, the Council included 53 elected members as opposed to 51 previously. The number of aldermen remained at 17.

== Retiring aldermen ==
The aldermen who retired at the election were

- John Bevan,
- Joseph Joseph,
- Sir Lewis Morris,
- Daniel Stephens,
- H J Thomas,
- Thomas Watkins,
- Joseph Mayberry,
- Augustus Brigstocke,

== Candidates ==
Eighteen wards were contested, compared with only six in 1904.

Four of those elected at the first election in 1889, and who had served continuously since then, sought re-election. Earl Cawdor, Sir James Drummond, C.E. Morris and D.C. Parry (Llanelli) were all returned unopposed.

== Outcome ==
While a small number of wards were hotly contested and the Conservatives made a small number of gains, their attempt to change the political composition of the council was unsuccessful.

In Llanarthney, a determined attempt was made to unseat Henry Jones-Davies, with allegations that the Conservative David Farr Davies, a colliery manager, was supported by some labour figures.

== Ward results ==
=== Abergwili ===
Abergwili 1907
Party	Candidate	Votes	%	±%
Liberal	John Lloyd*	unopposed		
Liberal hold		Swing		

=== Ammanford ===
New ward. Boundary change.

Ammanford 1907
Party	Candidate	Votes	%	±%
Liberal	Col. David Morris	349		
Liberal	D.J. Jones	281		
Majority				
Liberal win (new seat)				

=== Bettws ===
Boundary change

Bettws 1907
Party	Candidate	Votes	%	±%
Labour	Tom Morris	349		
Liberal	William Thomas	121		
Majority				
Labour win (new seat)				

=== Caio ===
Caio 1907
Party	Candidate	Votes	%	±%
Conservative	Sir James Hills-Johnes	234		
Liberal	T. Francis Jones*	182		
Majority				
Conservative gain from Liberal		Swing		

=== Carmarthen Eastern Ward (Lower Division) ===
Brigstocke contested previous elections as a Conservative.

Carmarthen Eastern Ward (Lower Division) 1907
Party	Candidate	Votes	%	±%
Independent	T.E. Brigstocke*	unopposed		
Independent hold		Swing		

=== Carmarthen Eastern Ward (Upper Division) ===
Carmarthen Eastern Ward (Upper Division) 1907
Party	Candidate	Votes	%	±%
Liberal	Rev Andrew Fuller-Mills*	247		
	Thomas Parke Jones	71		
Majority				
Liberal hold		Swing		

=== Carmarthen Western Ward (Lower Division) ===
Carmarthen Western Ward (Lower Division) 1907
Party	Candidate	Votes	%	±%
Liberal	John Lewis*	161		
Conservative	P.R. Lewis	144		
Majority				
Liberal hold		Swing		

=== Carmarthen Western Ward (Upper Division) ===
Carmarthen Western Ward (Upper Division) 1907
Party	Candidate	Votes	%	±%
Liberal	Professor D.E. Jones*	unopposed		
Liberal hold		Swing		

=== Cenarth ===
Cenarth 1907
Party	Candidate	Votes	%	±%
Liberal	Rev D.D. Walters	unopposed		
Liberal gain from Conservative		Swing		

=== Cilycwm ===
Cilycwm 1907
Party	Candidate	Votes	%	±%
Liberal	Rees Williams	unopposed		
Liberal hold		Swing		

=== Conwil ===
Conwil 1907
Party	Candidate	Votes	%	±%
Liberal	Thomas Jones*	unopposed		
Liberal hold		Swing		

=== Kidwelly ===
Kidwelly 1907
Party	Candidate	Votes	%	±%
	Samuel H. Anthony	283		
Conservative	Alfred Stephens*	263		
Majority				
Conservative hold		Swing		

=== Laugharne ===
Laugharne 1907
Party	Candidate	Votes	%	±%
Conservative	W.H. Dempster	189		
Liberal	John D. Morse	187		
Majority		2		
Conservative hold		Swing		

=== Llanarthney ===
Llanarthney 1907
Party	Candidate	Votes	%	±%
Liberal	Henry Jones-Davies*	313		
Independent	David Farr-Davies	261		
Majority				
Liberal hold		Swing		

=== Llanboidy ===
Llanboidy 1907
Party	Candidate	Votes	%	±%
Liberal	David Evans	unopposed		
Liberal hold		Swing		

=== Llandebie ===
Llandebie 1907
Party	Candidate	Votes	%	±%
Liberal	David Davies*	unopposed		
Liberal hold		Swing		

=== Llandilo Rural ===
Llandilo Rural 1907
Party	Candidate	Votes	%	±%
Liberal	L.N. Powell	unopposed		
Liberal hold		Swing		

=== Llandilo Urban ===
Gwynne Hughes had now returned to the Liberal fold.

Llandilo Urban 1907
Party	Candidate	Votes	%	±%
Liberal	J.W. Gwynne Hughes*	unopposed		
Liberal gain from Unionist		Swing		

=== Llandovery ===
Llandovery 1907
Party	Candidate	Votes	%	±%
Liberal	J.R. James*	unopposed		
Liberal hold		Swing		

=== Llandyssilio ===
Boundary Change

Llandyssilio 1907
Party	Candidate	Votes	%	±%
Liberal	Benjamin John	unopposed		
Liberal win (new seat)				

=== Llanedy ===
Llanedy 1907
Party	Candidate	Votes	%	±%
Liberal	John Ll. Thomas*	340		
Liberal	Griffith V. Davies	205		
Majority				
Liberal hold		Swing		

=== Llanegwad ===
Llanegwad 1907
Party	Candidate	Votes	%	±%
Independent	Delme Davies-Evans	266		
Liberal	T. Lewis	224		
Majority		42		
Independent gain from Liberal		Swing		

=== Llanelly Division 1 ===
Griffiths described himself as a Unionist in 1904

Llanelly Division 1 1907
Party	Candidate	Votes	%	±%
Independent	W. Griffiths	unopposed		
Independent hold		Swing		

=== Llanelly Division 2 ===
Llanelly Division 2 1907
Party	Candidate	Votes	%	±%
Labour	John Simlett	unopposed		
Labour gain from Liberal		Swing		

=== Llanelly Division 3 ===
Llanelly Division 3 1907
Party	Candidate	Votes	%	±%
Liberal	William David*	260		
Labour	Colwyn Morgan	53		
Majority				
Liberal hold		Swing		

=== Llanelly Division 4 ===
Llanelly Division 4 1907
Party	Candidate	Votes	%	±%
Liberal	John Thomas*	unopposed		
Liberal hold		Swing		

=== Llanelly Division 5 ===
Llanelly Division 5 1907
Party	Candidate	Votes	%	±%
Liberal	D.C. Parry*	unopposed		
Liberal hold		Swing		

=== Llanelly Division 6 ===
Llanelly Division 6 1907
Party	Candidate	Votes	%	±%
Labour	Joseph Roberts*	unopposed		
Labour hold		Swing		

=== Llanelly Division 7 ===
Llanelly Division 7 1907
Party	Candidate	Votes	%	±%
Independent	R.A. Nevill	unopposed		
Independent gain from Liberal		Swing		

=== Llanelly Division 8 ===
Llanelly Division 8 1907
Party	Candidate	Votes	%	±%
Liberal	Joseph Williams*	unopposed		
Liberal hold		Swing		

=== Llanelly Rural, Berwick ===
Llanelly Rural, Berwick 1907
Party	Candidate	Votes	%	±%
Liberal	David Harry	199		
Liberal	H.J. Hopkins	161		
Majority				
Liberal hold		Swing		

=== Llanelly Rural, Hengoed ===
Llanelly Rural, Hengoed 1907
Party	Candidate	Votes	%	±%
Liberal	W.B. Jones	unopposed		
Liberal hold		Swing		

=== Llanelly Rural, Westfa and Glyn ===
Llanelly Rural, Westfa and Glyn 1907
Party	Candidate	Votes	%	±%
Liberal	Rev Benjamin Humphreys	unopposed		
Liberal hold		Swing		

=== Llanfihangel Aberbythick ===
Llanfihangel Aberbythick 1907
Party	Candidate	Votes	%	±%
Conservative	Earl Cawdor*	Unopposed	N/A	N/A
Conservative hold				

=== Llanfihangel-ar-Arth ===
The sitting member was elected on the casting vote of the returning officer.

Llanfihangel-ar-Arth 1907
Party	Candidate	Votes	%	±%
Liberal	Thomas Barrett*	206		
Conservative	Thomas Rees Jones	206		
Majority		0		
Liberal hold		Swing		

=== Llangadock ===
Llangadock 1907
Party	Candidate	Votes	%	±%
Conservative	Mervyn Lloyd Peel	245		
Liberal	William Davies*	235		
Majority		10		
Conservative gain from Liberal		Swing		

=== Llangeler ===
Llangeler 1907
Party	Candidate	Votes	%	±%
Conservative	Colonel W.P. Lewes*	unopposed		
Conservative hold		Swing		

=== Llangendeirne ===
Llangendeirne 1907
Party	Candidate	Votes	%	±%
Liberal	Rev R.H. Jones	237		
Independent	Thomas Davies	175		
Majority				
Liberal hold		Swing		

=== Llangennech ===
Llangennech 1907
Party	Candidate	Votes	%	±%
Liberal	Thomas Thomas*	unopposed		
Liberal hold		Swing		

=== Llangunnor ===
Llangunnor 1907
Party	Candidate	Votes	%	±%
Liberal	C.E. Morris*	unopposed		
Liberal hold		Swing		

=== Llanon ===
Llanon 1907
Party	Candidate	Votes	%	±%
Liberal	William Greville*	unopposed		
Liberal hold		Swing		

=== Llansawel ===
Llansawel 1907
Party	Candidate	Votes	%	±%
Conservative	Sir J.H.W. Drummond, Bart.*	Unopposed	N/A	N/A
Conservative hold				

=== Llanstephan ===
Llanstephan 1907
Party	Candidate	Votes	%	±%
Liberal	John Johns*	unopposed		
Liberal hold		Swing		

=== Llanybyther ===
Williams had been elected as a Conservative in 1904.

Llanybyther 1907
Party	Candidate	Votes	%	±%
Liberal	David Williams	234		
Liberal hold		Swing		

=== Mothvey ===
Mothvey 1907
Party	Candidate	Votes	%	±%
Liberal	David Davies*	unopposed		
Liberal hold		Swing		

=== Pembrey North ===
Pembrey North 1907
Party	Candidate	Votes	%	±%
Liberal	Rev J.H. Rees*	unopposed		
Liberal hold		Swing		

=== Pembrey South ===
Pembrey South 1907
Party	Candidate	Votes	%	±%
Independent	George Eynon Bowen	368		
Liberal	Richard Thomas Hammond*	296		
Majority				
Independent gain from Liberal		Swing		

=== Quarter Bach ===
Quarter Bach 1907
Party	Candidate	Votes	%	±%
Liberal	W.J. Williams	389		
Liberal	Gwilym Vaughan	277		
Majority				
Liberal hold		Swing		

=== Rhydcymmerai ===
Rhydcymmerai 1907
Party	Candidate	Votes	%	±%
Liberal	Benjamin Evans*	unopposed		
Liberal hold		Swing		

=== St Clears ===
St Clears 1907
Party	Candidate	Votes	%	±%
Liberal	James Phillips*	unopposed		
Liberal hold		Swing		

=== St Ishmael ===
St Ishmael 1907
Party	Candidate	Votes	%	±%
Liberal	John Lloyd Thomas*	unopposed		
Liberal hold		Swing		

=== Trelech ===
Trelech 1907
Party	Candidate	Votes	%	±%
Liberal	William Thomas*	unopposed		
Liberal hold		Swing		

=== Whitland ===
Whitland 1907
Party	Candidate	Votes	%	±%
Independent	Dr R.L. Thomas	226		
Liberal	John Scourfield*	167		
Majority				
Independent gain from Liberal		Swing		

== Election of aldermen ==
In addition to the 51 councillors the council consisted of 17 county aldermen. Aldermen were elected by the council, and served a six-year term. Following the elections the following eight aldermen were elected (with the number of votes in each case).
