= County Hall, Carmarthen =

County building in Carmarthen, Wales

County Hall
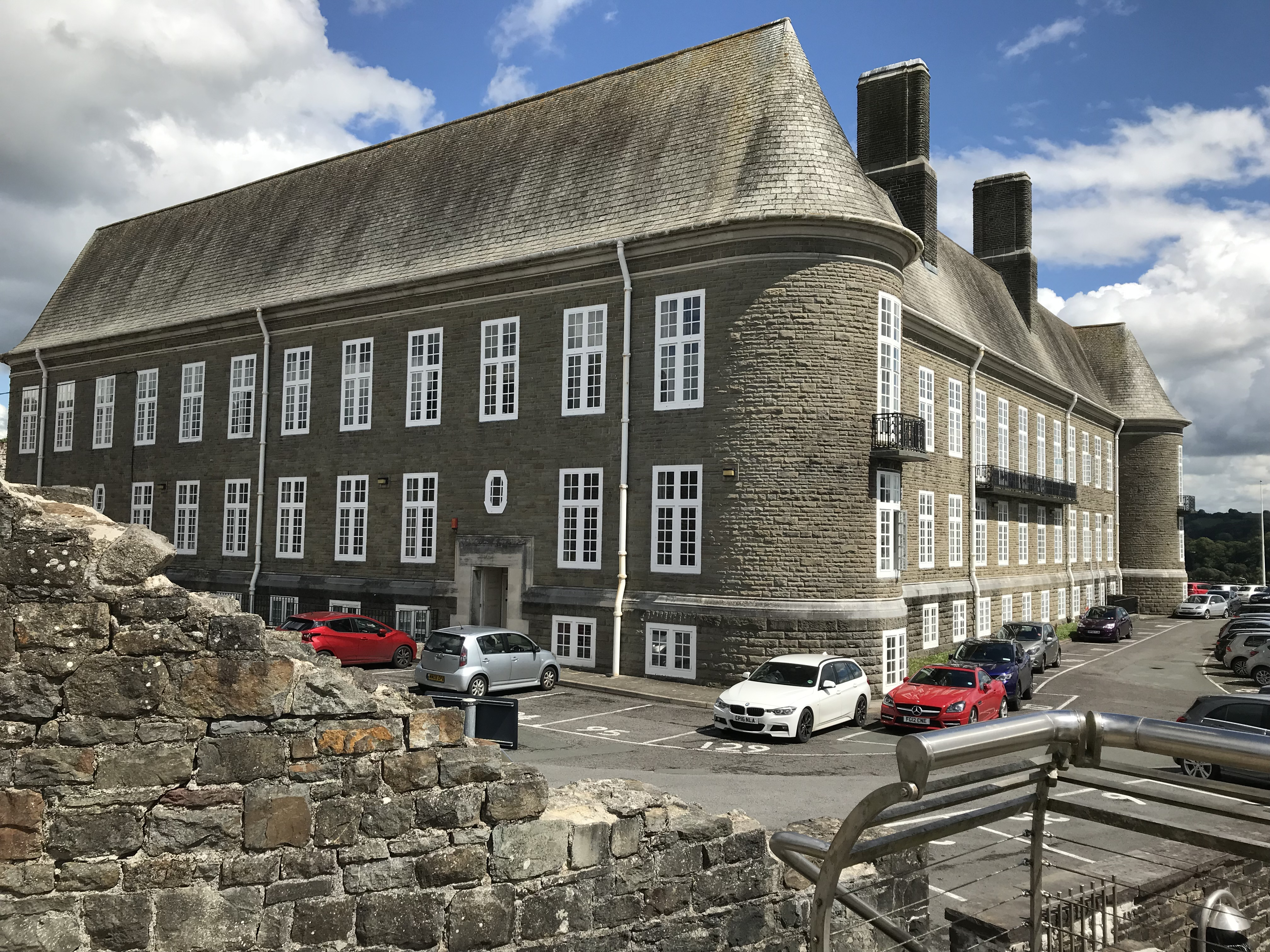
- View of County Hall from the south west corner of the building

- Location within Carmarthenshire
- 51.8555°N 4.3053°W
- Location: Carmarthen

History
- Built: 1955

Site notes
- Architect: Percy Thomas
- Architectural style: French Renaissance style

Listed Building – Grade II
- Designated: 28 November 2003
- Reference no.: 82151

County Hall (Welsh: Neuadd y Sir Caerfyrddin) is a municipal facility on Castle Hill in Carmarthen, Wales. The building, which is the headquarters of Carmarthenshire County Council, is a Grade II listed building.

== History ==
Following the implementation of the Local Government Act 1888, which established county councils in every county, it became necessary to find a home for Carmarthenshire County Council. The county council initially met in Llandovery and then moved to Bank House on Spilman Street in Carmarthen in 1907. After finding that the Spilman Street facilities were too cramped, county leaders decided to procure modern facilities. The site selected had been occupied by the old Carmarthen jail, which had originally been designed by John Nash and built on part of the Carmarthen Castle site in 1792.

The construction began with the demolition of the old jail which took place in 1936. The construction work on new building, which was designed by Percy Thomas in the French Renaissance style and built by W.T. Nicholls of Gloucester, was delayed by the advent of the Second World War and was not completed until 1955. It was officially opened in 1956. The design, which used grey Forest of Dean stone, involved a symmetrical main frontage of fifteen bays facing north; the central section of five bays featured a doorway with a stone surround containing heraldic devices carved by David Evans and a metal balcony and French doors on the first floor; there were also metal balconies and French doors on the first floor in the end bays which were curved, turreted and projected forwards. Internally, the principal room was the council chamber. The building was described by Cadw as "one of the most notable mid 20th century public buildings in Wales by a leading Welsh architect".

After the implementation of the Local Government Act 1972, the new building became the home of Dyfed County Council in 1974. On 1 April 1996, under the Local Government (Wales) Act 1994, Dyfed County Council was broken up and the building became the headquarters of the new Carmarthenshire County Council. The Earl of Wessex visited County Hall on 17 October 2002 in his capacity as a trustee of The Duke of Edinburgh's Award. In August 2018 a six-metre statue sculpture of a bike designed by "Wild Creations" was erected at the south west corner of building as part of the preparations for the Tour of Britain the route of which went past County Hall on the way from Pembrey Country Park to Llandovery.

Works of art in the building include a painting by the Welsh artist, Evan Walters, depicting Eve in the Garden of Eden.
