= Tommy Jones-Davies =

British Lions & Wales international rugby union footballer

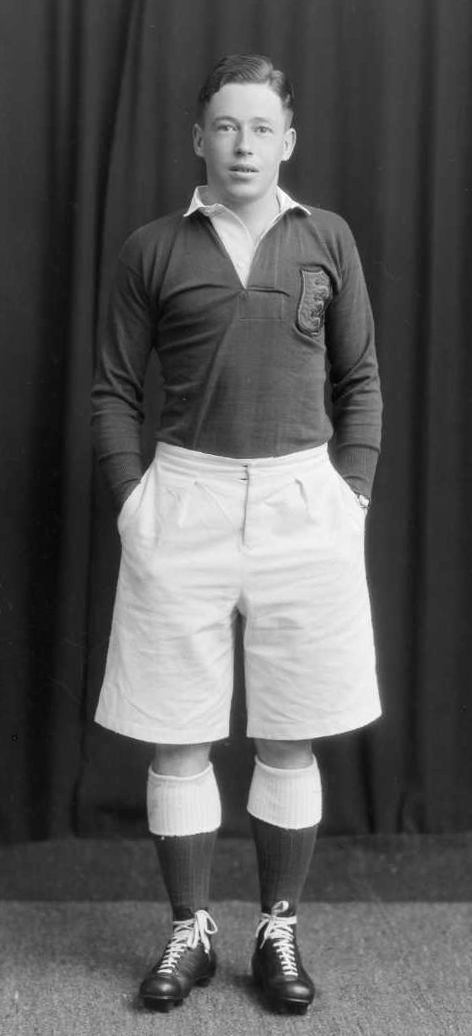
- Jones-Davies in New Zealand in 1930
- Born: Thomas Ellis Jones-Davies; 4 March 1906 Nantgaredig, Wales
- Died: 25 August 1960 (aged 54) Swansea, Wales
- School: Queen Elizabeth Grammar School, Carmarthen; St George's School, Harpenden
- University: Gonville and Caius College, Cambridge; St George's, University of London
- Occupation: Doctor

Rugby union career
- Position: Centre
Amateur team(s)
| Years | Team | Apps | (Points) |
- Llanelli RFC
| – | London Welsh RFC | | |
| – | United Hospitals | | |
| – | Barbarian F.C. | | |
International career
| Years | Team | Apps | (Points) |
| 1930–1931 | Wales | 4 | (6) |
| 1930 | British Lions | 0 | (0) |

Thomas Ellis Jones-Davies (4 March 1906 – 25 August 1960) was a Welsh physician and international rugby union centre.

He played club rugby for Llanelli and London Welsh. He won four caps for Wales and was a member of Doug Prentice's British Lions in their tour of New Zealand and Australia in 1930.

== Personal history ==
Jones-Davies was born in Nantgaredig, Carmarthen to agricultural co-operative pioneer Henry Jones-Davies and Winifred Anna Ellis. He was educated at Queen Elizabeth Grammar School, Carmarthen and St George's School, Harpenden before gaining a place at Gonville and Caius College, Cambridge and St George's Hospital, London.

He married in 1938 Nesta, the daughter of Dr. and Mrs. Hector Jones, Maesteg; they had one son, Colonel T.E. Jones-Davies.

He was appointed High Sheriff of Carmarthenshire in 1952.

== Medical career ==
After gaining his medical qualifications he served as an assistant medical officer in London before becoming the Medical Officer for Health for Radnorshire in 1938. During World War II he served as an officer in the Royal Army Medical Corps.

After the war he was appointed a consultant physician at the West Wales Hospital, Carmarthen, a position he held for ten years until his death.

== Rugby career ==
Jones-Davies was first selected to play for the Welsh national team in the country's opening game of the 1930 Five Nations Championship while team captain of London Welsh. Played at the Cardiff Arms Park in a match against England, Jones-Davies was one of four new Welsh caps in the squad; Hickman of Neath, Ocker Thomas of Abertillery RFC and fellow London Welsh player David Edward Roberts. Wales lost the match 11–3, Jones-Davies scoring the three Welsh points with a try. Jones-Davies was not selected for the away game to Scotland, but was back in the team to face the Irish at St. Helen's ground in Swansea. Playing alongside London Welsh stalwart Wick Powell, Jones-Davies finished on the winning side as Wales beat Ireland, robbing them of the Triple Crown.

Jones-Davies played two more games for Wales, both as part of the 1931 Five Nations Championship. Under the captaincy of Penarth's Jack Bassett, Jones-Davies was a member of the Welsh team that drew with England at Twickenham and beat Scotland at the Arms Park. Jones-Davies scored one of the tries in the England game, and after Wales won the last two games of the tournament he found himself part of a Championship winning team.

In 1930 Jones-Davies was selected for the British Lions tour of Australia and New Zealand. Jones-Davies was one of seven Welsh players chosen to represent the Lions on the tour, but unlike his countrymen he did not play in any of the five test games.

=== International matches played ===
Wales

- England 1930, 1931
- Ireland 1930
- Scotland 1931
