= Ammanford Urban District Council =

Former Welsh urban district council

Ammanford Urban District Council was a former local authority in Carmarthenshire, Wales, responsible for administering the town of Ammanford. It was established in 1903 covering areas ceded from the parishes of Llandybie and Betws. It was created specifically as a result of the rapid population growth in the town as a result of the expansion of the Welsh anthracite coalfield.

Ammanford Urban District Council comprised fifteen councillors including a chairman and, following the initial election of fifteen members a third of the council stood down annually. The council, like other urban districts, was responsible for sanitation, sewerage, housing, streets, cemeteries, libraries, parks, and the licensing of public entertainments. The council was administered by a number of committees and by officers including a Clerk and Medical Officer of Health.

The council was abolished in 1974 and Ammanford became part of the new borough of Dinefwr.

== Election results ==
=== 1903 Election ===
In the first election, eight of the fifteen seats were won by labour candidates.

Ammanford Urban District 1903
Party	Candidate	Votes	%	±%
	D.J. Jones	374		
	Erne Hewlett	365		
	William Nathaniel Jones	352		
Labour	J. Morgan	345		
Labour	John Davies	327		
	Lt-Col David Morris	315		
Labour	Evan Evans	311		
Labour	Henry Davies	302		
	Samuel Callard	300		
	William Jones	285		
Labour	David George	270		
Labour	W. Rees	263		
Labour	Thomas Fletcher	255		
Labour	John Evan Jones	246		
Labour	E. Jones	241		
Labour	J. Cooper Davies	223		
	T.L. Davies	201		
	D. Davies	200		
	Evan Evans	199		
	H. Lewis	136		
	B.R. Evans	124		
	John Harries	123		
	H. Davies	43		

Elected: D J Jones, ironmonger (I); 374 E Hewlett, colliery manager (I); 3G; W N Jones, auctioneer (I); 352 J Morgans, haulier (Lab), 345; John Davies shearer (Lab); 327 Lieut-Col D Morris (Ind), 315; E. Evans, checkweigher (Lab); 311 Henry Davies, carpenter (Lab); 302 S Callard. Chemical Works (I); 300 Wm Jones, draper (I); 285 D George, collier, (Lab), 270; W Rees, annealer (Lab), 263 T Fletcher, rollerman (Lab), 256 J E Jones, collier (Lab), 246; E Jones, shearer (Lab), 241.

Non-elected J Cooper Davies, engineer (Lab), 223 T L Davies, baker (I), 201 D Thomas, builder (I), 200; E Evans, chemist (I), 199; H Lewis, hotel keeper (I), 136; B R Evans, draper (I), 124; John Harries, inn keeper (I), 123; H. Davies, weaver (I), 43.

=== 1904 Election ===
Following the inaugural elections five Labour candidates retired. Two of them did not seek re-election and three of the five seats were won by Independent candidates.

Ammanford Urban District 1904
Party	Candidate	Votes	%	±%
	William Evans	364		
Labour	Thomas Fletcher*	289		
	George Roblin	270		
	J.R. Watkins	231		
Labour	John Jones*	213		
Labour	David George*	198		
	B.R. Evans	197		
	J.C. Shaw	175		
	J.C. Davies	132		
	D. Thomas	92		
	Y. Williams	89		
	W. Hodges	83		

=== 1905 Election ===
Four of the five retiring members were re-elected.

Ammanford Urban District 1905
Party	Candidate	Votes	%	±%
	David Morris*	426		
	William Jones*	359		
Labour	Evan Evans*	352		
	Benjamin Richard Evans	313		
Labour	Henry Davies*	288		
Labour	David George	267		
	Samuel Callard*	197		

=== 1906 Election ===
D.J. Jones, who headed the poll at the first election in 1903 lost his seat.

Ammanford Urban District 1906
Party	Candidate	Votes	%	±%
	David Jones*	398		
	Erne Hewlett*	378		
	Rev John Morgan*	349		
	W.N. Jones*	301		
	T.L. Davies	286		
	T.G. Lewis	231		
	D.J. Jones*	226		
Labour	J. Davies*	219		

=== 1907 Election ===
Labour candidates fared badly in this election.

Ammanford Urban District 1907
Party	Candidate	Votes	%	±%
	Thomas Fletcher*	453		
	William Evans*	429		
	George Robling*	421		
	E. James	347		
	John Davies	324		
	David Jones	287		
Labour	John Evan Jones	236		
Labour	Thomas Evans	152		
Labour	Jestyn Williams	146		

=== 1908 Election ===
Due to a vacancy, six candidates were returned at this election.

Ammanford Urban District 1908
Party	Candidate	Votes	%	±%
	David Morris*	562		
Labour	Evan Evans*	418		
	David Jones*	409		
	Rees Thomas	384		
Labour	John Henry Lawley	269		
Labour	John Evan Jones	263		

=== 1910 Election ===
A closely fought election saw one of the leading members of the authority defeated.

Ammanford Urban District 1910
Party	Candidate	Votes	%	±%
	William Evans*	496		
	James Darbyshire	471		
	Thomas Fletcher*	471		
	George Robling*	462		
	John Davies*	392		
	William Nathaniel Jones*	385		
Labour	John Evan Jones	378		

=== 1911 Election ===
W.N. Jones regained his seat following a surprise defeat the previous year.

Ammanford Urban District 1911
Party	Candidate	Votes	%	±%
	William Nathaniel Jones	550		
	David Morris*	525		
Labour	Evan Evans*	491		
	David Jones*	454		
Labour	John Evan Jones	426		
Labour	David George	314		
	George W. Davies	207		
	John Lawley*	191		

=== 1912 Election ===
Four of the five retiring members were returned.

Ammanford Urban District 1912
Party	Candidate	Votes	%	±%
	Erne Hewlett*	737		
	Rev John Morgan*	564		
Labour	John Harries*	417		
	B.R. Evans*	402		
	Joseph Clutton Shaw	374		
	J.L. Davies*	339		
	Sam Roberts	220		
	D.Ll.Lloyd	194		
	George W. Davies	192		
	Joseph Joseph	117		

=== 1913 Election ===
In a somewhat heated campaign three of the five sitting members were defeated.

Ammanford Urban District 1913
Party	Candidate	Votes	%	±%
	Evan Lewis	536		
	James Darbyshire*	495		
	Martin Davies	444		
	William Evans*	406		
	D. Griffiths Davies	403		
	Thomas Fletcher*	376		
Labour	David George*	360		
	John Davies*	341		
	B.W. Davies	298		
	George W. Davies	266		
	Arthur Rees	5		

=== 1914 Election ===
Although fourteen candidates sought election for the five seats, the election was described as a quiet affair with no public meetings.

Ammanford Urban District 1914
Party	Candidate	Votes	%	±%
	William Nathaniel Jones*	595		
	David Jones*	554		
Labour	Evan Evans*	438		
	Thomas Fletcher	436		
	John Davies	343		
	W. Lock Smith	342		
Labour	David George*	322		
Labour	John Evan Jones*	281		
	Morgan Thomas	260		
	J.L. Williams	259		
	Tom Evans	222		
	Tom Grey	212		
	Owen Madden	155		
	Joseph Joseph	115		

=== 1919 Election ===
Elections were postponed during the war and the first post-war election was fiercely contested between Labour and non-Labour candidates. The latter won all the seats.

Ammanford Urban District 1919
Party	Candidate	Votes	%	±%
	Frank Dawson	1,124		
Independent	Evan Lewis*	1,022		
Independent	Thomas Lake	1,022		
Independent	William Evans*	912		
Independent	W. Lock Smith	878		
Independent Labour	John Lawley	733		
Labour	David George*	728		
Labour	Samuel Waters	655		
Labour	John Evan Jones*	649		
Labour	Jeremiah Griffiths	438		
Independent	Rees Taliesein Jones	347		
	David John Edwards	307		
