= Carmarthenshire County Council =

Local government in Wales

Carmarthenshire County Council Cyngor Sir Gâr (Welsh)

Type
- Type: Principal council

Leadership
- Chair: Giles Morgan, Independent since 20 May 2026
- Leader: Linda Evans, Plaid Cymru since 10 December 2025
- Chief Executive: Wendy Walters since June 2019

Structure
- Seats: 75 councillors
- Graph of the party split among 75 seats.
- Political groups: Administration (50) Plaid Cymru (39) Independent (11) Other parties (25) Labour (14) Green (1) Reform (1) Independent (9)
- Length of term: 5 years

Elections
- Voting system: First past the post
- Last election: 5 May 2022
- Next election: 6 May 2027

Meeting place
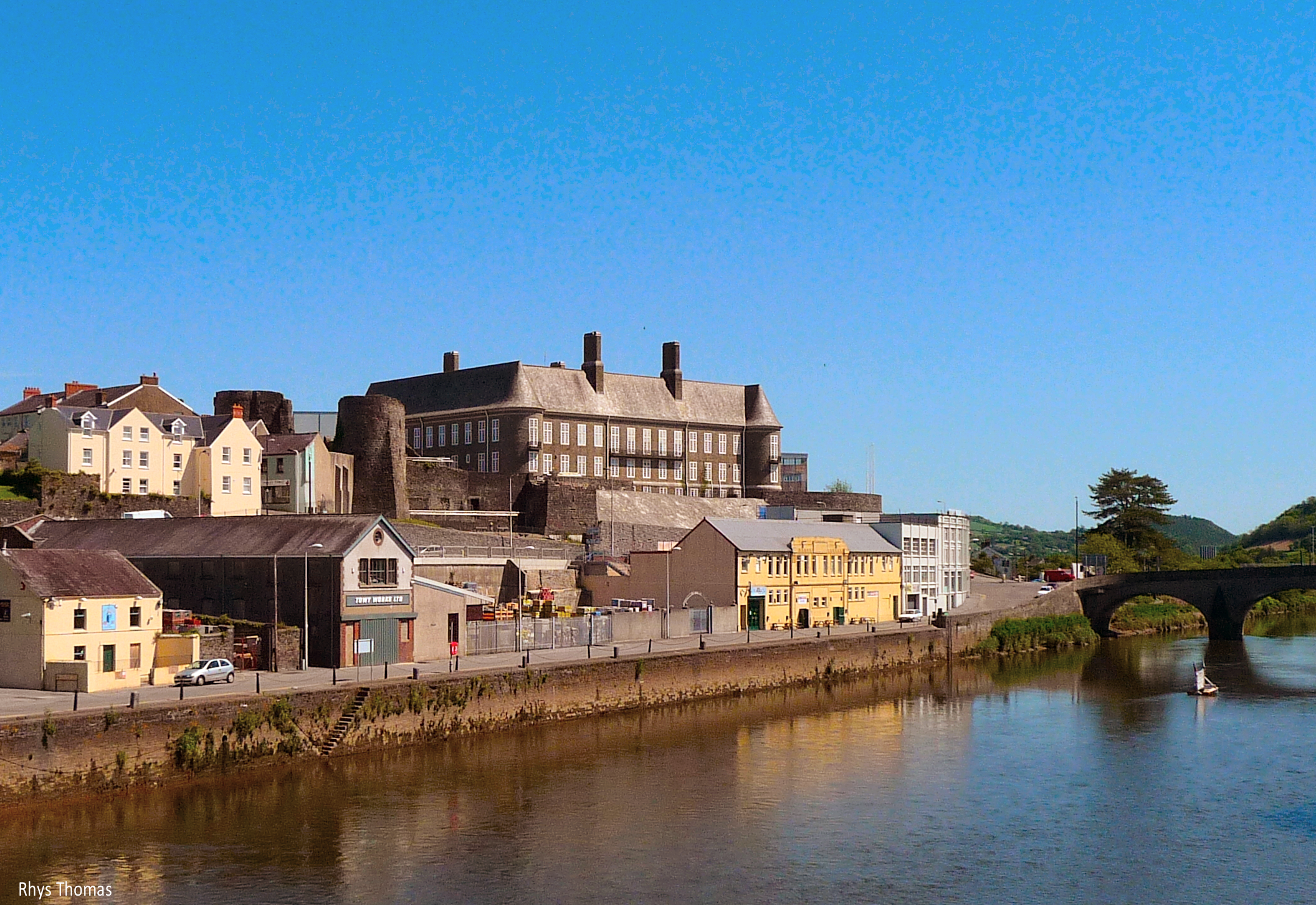
- County Hall, Carmarthen, SA31 1JP

Website
- www.carmarthenshire.gov.wales

Carmarthenshire County Council (Welsh: Cyngor Sir Gâr or Cyngor Sir Gaerfyrddin) is the local authority for the county of Carmarthenshire, one of the principal areas of Wales. The council is based at County Hall in Carmarthen. There have been two bodies called Carmarthenshire County Council. The first existed from 1889 until 1974, and the current one was created in 1996.

== History ==
Elected county councils were created in 1889 under the Local Government Act 1888, taking over certain functions which had previously been administered by unelected magistrates at each county's quarter sessions. The first election was held in January 1889 and the majority of the seats were won by the Liberals.

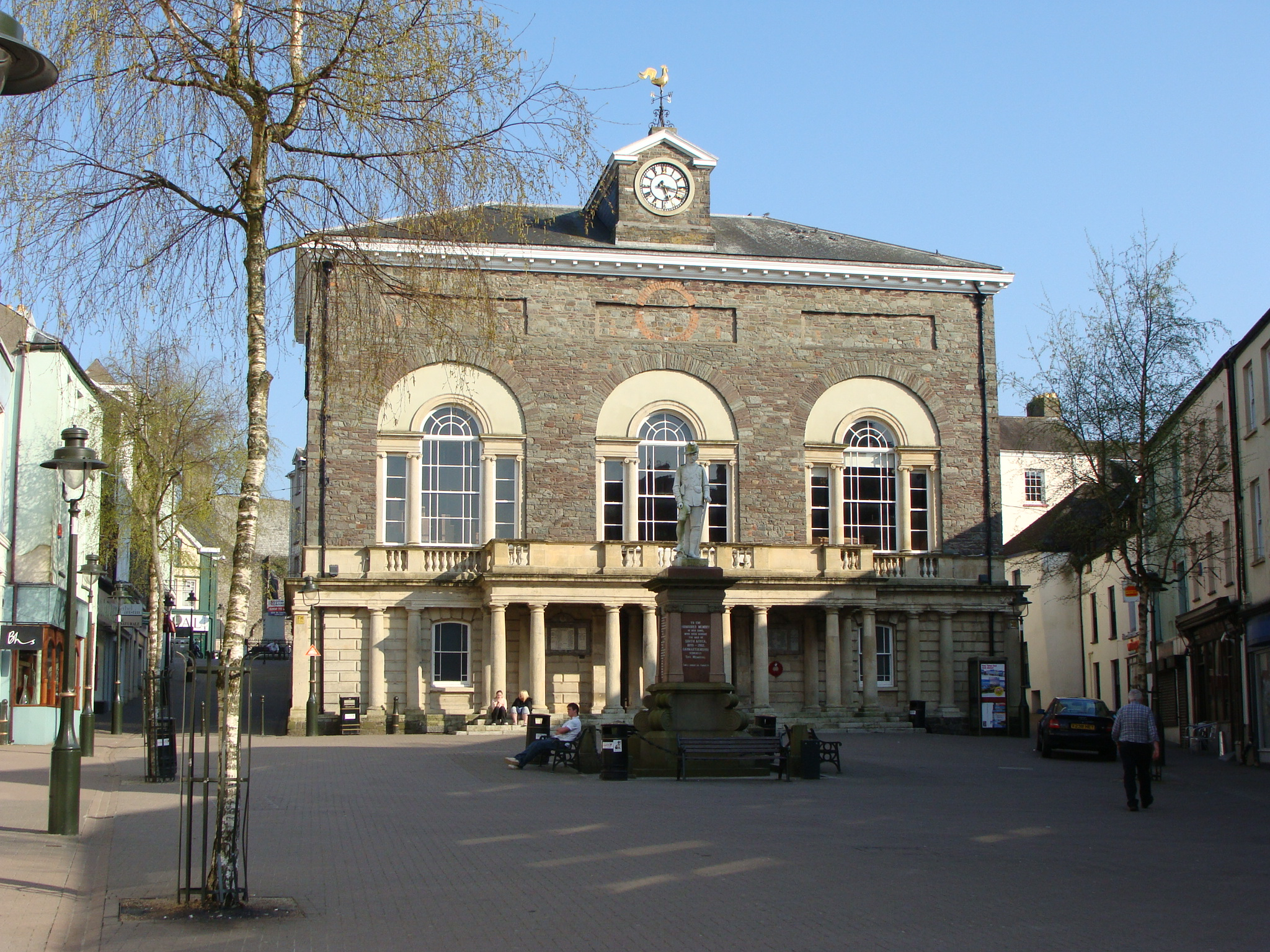
Carmarthen Guildhall: Council's first meeting place

At a preliminary meeting in March 1889 the councillors debated where the new council should meet, with some advocating that meetings should rotate between Carmarthen, Llandeilo and Llanelli, others arguing that meetings should be held solely in Carmarthen. It was resolved by 30 votes to 29 to meet only in Carmarthen. The council formally came into its powers on 1 April 1889, on which day it held its first official meeting at Carmarthen Guildhall (then also known as the Shire Hall).

By 1895 the council had adopted the pattern of holding meetings in rotation at Carmarthen, Llandeilo and Llanelli, and the council's clerk was based in Llandovery. Construction of a new County Hall in Carmarthen started in 1939 but, due to the Second World War, was not completed until 1955.

The Liberals continued to dominate the council until the 1920s, from which time most rural seats were held by independents, while the Labour Party dominated the industrial part of the county.

The original Carmarthenshire County Council was abolished under the Local Government Act 1972, with the area becoming part of the county of Dyfed, which also covered the former counties of Pembrokeshire and Cardiganshire. From 1974 until 1996 the area of the former county of Carmarthenshire was split into the three districts of Carmarthen, Dinefwr, and Llanelli, with Dyfed County Council providing county-level services.

In 1996 the councils established in 1974 were all abolished under the Local Government (Wales) Act 1994, and Carmarthenshire County Council was re-established as a unitary authority for the area.

== Political control ==
Plaid Cymru won a majority of the council's seats at the 2022 election but lost its majority following a defection in May 2024, since when the council has been under no overall control.

The first election to the re-established council was held in 1995, initially operating as a shadow authority before coming into its powers on 1 April 1996. Political control of the council since 1996 has been as follows:

Party in control	Years
No overall control	1996–2022
Plaid Cymru	2022–2024
No overall control	2024–present

=== Leadership ===
The leaders of the council since 1996 have been:

Councillor	Party	From	To
Gerald Meyler	Labour	1 Apr 1996	May 1999
Meryl Gravell	Independent	May 1999	May 2012
Kevin Madge	Labour	May 2012	May 2015
Emlyn Dole	Plaid Cymru	May 2015	May 2022
Darren Price	Plaid Cymru	25 May 2022	13 Nov 2025
Linda Evans	Plaid Cymru	10 Dec 2025	

The council's chief executive since 2019 has been Wendy Walters. She succeeded Mark James, who had held the post for 17 years.

=== Composition ===
Following the 2022 election and subsequent by-elections and changes of allegiance up to October 2026, the composition of the council was:

Party	Seats
Plaid Cymru	38
Labour	15
Green	1
Reform	1
Independent	20
Total	75

Of the independent councillors, eleven sit together as the "Independent Group" and the other nine are unaffiliated to any group. The council's cabinet is made up of Plaid Cymru and Independent Group councillors. The next election is due in 2027.

== Elections ==
Elections take place every five years. The last election was held on 5 May 2022.

Year	Seats	Plaid Cymru	Labour	Independent	Liberal Democrats	Conservative	Notes
1995	80	7	**37**	32 (Note: Includes candidates elected as Independent Labour and/or Ratepayers Association.)	3	1	
1999	74	13	28	**32**	1	0	
2004	74	16	25	**33**	0	1	
2008	74	**31**	12	30	1	0	
2012	74	**28**	23	23	0	0	
2017	74	**36**	22	16	0	0	
2022	75	**38**	23	14	0	0	Plaid Cymru majority control

Party with the most elected councillors in bold. Coalition agreements in Notes column.

Elections to the original county council included:

- 1889 Carmarthenshire County Council election
- 1892 Carmarthenshire County Council election
- 1895 Carmarthenshire County Council election
- 1898 Carmarthenshire County Council election
- 1901 Carmarthenshire County Council election
- 1904 Carmarthenshire County Council election
- 1907 Carmarthenshire County Council election
- 1910 Carmarthenshire County Council election
- 1913 Carmarthenshire County Council election
- 1946 Carmarthenshire County Council election

== Electoral divisions ==
The county is divided into 51 electoral wards returning 75 councillors. In July 2021 Welsh Government accepted a number of ward change proposals by the Local Democracy and Boundary Commission for Wales, the changes gave a better parity of representation. Thirty-four wards remained unchanged.

Most of these wards are coterminous with communities. Most communities in Carmarthenshire have a community council. For each ward, councillors are elected to sit on Carmarthenshire County Council. The following table lists council wards, community councils and associated geographical areas. Communities with their own community council are marked with a *.

	Ward	Communities	Councillors Returned	Former district council	Electorate 2022
1	Abergwili	Abergwili*, Llanllawddog*	1	Carmarthen	1,960
2	Ammanford	Ammanford Town* (Iscennen, Pontamman and Pantyffynnon wards)	2	Dinefwr	4194
3	Betws	Betws*	1	Dinefwr	1,896
4	Bigyn	Llanelli Town* (Bigyn ward)	3	Llanelli	4,986
5	Burry Port	Pembrey and Burry Port Town (Burry Port ward)	2	Llanelli	3,440
6	Bynea	Llanelli Rural* (Bynea ward)	2	Llanelli	3,229
7	Carmarthen Town North and South	Carmarthen Town* (North and South wards)	3	Carmarthen	6,822
8	Carmarthen Town West	Carmarthen Town* (Carmarthen Town West ward)	2	Carmarthen	3,767
9	Cenarth and Llangeler	Cenarth*, Llangeler* and Newcastle Emlyn*	2	Carmarthen	4,539
10	Cilycwm	Cil-y-cwm*, Llansadwrn*, Llanwrda*, Cynwyl Gaeo* and Llanycrwys*	1	Dinefwr, Carmarthen	2,244
11	Cwarter Bach	Cwarter Bach*	1	Dinefwr	2,232
12	Cynwyl Elfed	Cynwyl Elfed*, Bronwydd* and Llanpumsaint*	1	Carmarthen	2,028
13	Dafen and Felinfoel	Llanelli Rural* (Dafen and Felinfoel ward)	2	Llanelli	4,064
14	Elli	Llanelli Town* (Elli ward)	1	Llanelli	
15	Garnant	Cwmamman* (Pistillwyd and Twyn wards)	1	Dinefwr	1,627
16	Glanamman	Cwmamman* (Grenig and Tircoed wards)	1	Dinefwr	1,879
17	Glanymor	Llanelli Town* (Glanymor ward)	2	Llanelli	4,649
18	Glyn	Llanelli Rural* (Glyn ward)	1	Llanelli	1,758
19	Gorslas	Gorslas*	2	Dinefwr	3,788
20	Hendy	Llanedi* (Hendy ward)	1	Llanelli	2,364
21	Hengoed	Llanelli Rural* (Hengoed ward)	2	Llanelli	3,270
22	Kidwelly and St. Ishmael	Kidwelly Town* and St Ishmael*	2	Llanelli	4,080
23	Laugharne Township	Laugharne Township*, Eglwyscummin, Llanddowror* and Pendine*	1	Carmarthen	2,231
24	Llanboidy	Llanboidy*, Cilymaenllwyd* and Llangynin*	1	Carmarthen	1,744
25	Llanddarog	Llanddarog* and Llanarthney	1	Carmarthen	1,710
26	Llandeilo	Llandeilo Town* and Dyffryn Cennen*	1	Dinefwr	2,148
27	Llandovery	Llandovery Town* and Llanfair-ar-y-bryn*	1	Dinefwr	2,121
28	Llandybie	Llandybie* (Llandybie and Heolddu wards)	2	Dinefwr	3,334
29	Llanegwad	Llanegwad*, Llanfihangel Rhos-y-Corn* and Llanfynydd*	1	Dinefwr, Carmarthen	2,079
30	Llanfihangel Aberbythych	Llanfihangel Aberbythych* and Llangathen*	1	Dinefwr	1,549
31	Llanfihangel-ar-Arth	Llanfihangel-ar-Arth* and Llanllwni*	1	Carmarthen	2,282
32	Llangadog	Llangadog*, Llanddeusant* and Myddfai*	1	Dinefwr	1,646
33	Llangennech	Llangennech*	2	Llanelli	4,122
34	Llangunnor	Llangunnor*	1	Carmarthen	2,194
35	Llangyndeyrn	Llangyndeyrn* and Llandyfaelog*	2	Carmarthen	4,073
36	Llannon	Llannon*	2	Llanelli	4,263
37	Llanybydder	Llanybydder* and Pencarreg*	1	Carmarthen	2,137
38	Lliedi	Llanelli Town* (Lliedi ward)	2	Llanelli	4,009
39	Llwynhendy	Llanelli Rural* (Pemberton ward)	2	Llanelli	3,297
40	Manordeilo and Salem	Manordeilo and Salem*, Llansawel* and Talley*	1	Dinefwr	2,216
41	Pembrey	Pembrey and Burry Port Town* (Pembrey ward)	2	Llanelli	3,544
42	Pen-y-groes	Llandybie (Penygroes ward)	1	Dinefwr	2,363
43	Pontyberem	Pontyberem*	1	Llanelli	2,229
44	Saron	Llandybie* (Saron Ward)	2	Dinefwr	3,405
45	St Clears and Llansteffan	St Clears Town* Llansteffan*, Llangain* and Llangynog*	2	Carmarthen	4,321
46	Swiss Valley	Llanelli Rural* (Swiss Valley ward)	1	Llanelli	2,199
47	Trelech	Abernant*, Llanwinio*, Meidrim*, Newchurch and Merthyr* and Trelech*	1	Carmarthen	2,374
48	Trimsaran	Trimsaran*	1	Llanelli	1,968
49	Tycroes	Llanedi* (Tycroes and Llanedi wards)	1	Llanelli	2,182
50	Tyisha	Llanelli* (Tyisha ward)	2	Llanelli	
51	Whitland	Whitland Town* and Henllanfallteg	1	Carmarthen	1,841

== Premises ==
The council meets and has its main offices at County Hall in Carmarthen, which had been completed in 1955 for the original Carmarthenshire County Council, and served as the headquarters of Dyfed County Council between 1974 and 1996. The council has customer service centres in Ammanford, Carmarthen and Llanelli.

== Arms ==
Coat of arms of Carmarthenshire County Council
Notes Granted on 28 August 1935. Crest On a wreath of the colours a dragon passant Gules gorged with a collar flory counterflory and resting the dexter foreclaw on a harp Or. Escutcheon Quarterly indented Or and Gules in the first and fourth quarters a dragon rampant and in the second and third quarters a lion rampant all counterchanged. Supporters On the dexter side a dragon Gules gorged with a collar flory counterflory attached thereto a chain reflexed over the back Or and on the sinister side a sea horse Argent the piscine parts Proper gorged with a collar flory counterflory attached thereto a chain reflexed over the back Or. Granted 1997. Motto Rhyddid Gwerin Ffyniant Gwlad (The Freedom Of The People Is The Prosperity Of The Country) Badge Within an elliptical cable Azure knotted in base issuing out of a bailey of five towers a garb Or banded Vert. Granted 1997.
