= 1889 Carmarthenshire County Council election =

Welsh local election

All 68 seats to Carmarthenshire County Council 35 seats needed for a majority
	First party	Second party	Third party
Party	Liberal	Conservative	Liberal Unionist
Seats won	53/68	12/68	2/68
Councillors	39	9	2
Aldermen	14	3	0
	Fourth party
Party	Independent
Seats won	1/68
Councillors	1
Aldermen	0
Council control after election
Liberal
Liberal Party

The first election to the Carmarthenshire County Council was held in January 1889. It was followed by the 1892 election.

== Overview of the result ==
1889 was one of those landmark years in the history of Welsh Liberalism, a coming of age symbolized by the triumph across Wales of Liberal candidates in the inaugural county council elections.

== Candidates ==
Most of the seats were contested by Liberal and Conservative candidates, although in a number of cases rival Liberals fought each other. The number of unopposed returns was small.

== Outcome ==
There were a large number of contested elections and the majorities were small in most instances. The Liberals won a large majority of the seats with only nine Conservatives returned. There were also two Liberal Unionists, in Carmarthen and Llansteffan.

The Liberal victory was later augmented by the election of fourteen Liberals as aldermen, as opposed to three Conservatives.

This was the inaugural county election and therefore no comparison can be made with the previous elections. In some cases there is an ambiguity in the sources over the party affiliations and this is explained below where relevant.

== Ward results ==
=== Abergwili ===
Abergwili 1889
Party	Candidate	Votes	%	±%
Liberal	D.L. Jones	226		
Liberal	John Lloyd	221		
Majority		5		
Liberal win (new seat)				

=== Bettws ===
Bettws 1889
Party	Candidate	Votes	%	±%
Liberal	William Nathaniel Jones	277		
Liberal	James Rees	230		
Majority		46		
Liberal win (new seat)				

=== Caio ===
Caio 1889
Party	Candidate	Votes	%	±%
Liberal	C. Lewis Davies	240		
Conservative	Sir James Hills-Johnes	200		
Majority		40		
Liberal win (new seat)				

=== Carmarthen Eastern Ward (Lower Division) ===
Carmarthen Eastern Ward (Lower Division) 1889
Party	Candidate	Votes	%	±%
Liberal	Thomas Jenkins	235		
Conservative	H. Brunel White	230		
Majority		5		
Liberal win (new seat)				

=== Carmarthen Eastern Ward (Upper Division) ===
Carmarthen Eastern Ward (Upper Division) 1889
Party	Candidate	Votes	%	±%
Liberal Unionist	H. Norton	213		
Liberal	Thomas Davies	192		
Majority		21		
Liberal Unionist win (new seat)				

=== Carmarthen Western Ward (Lower Division) ===
Carmarthen Western Ward (Lower Division) 1889
Party	Candidate	Votes	%	±%
Conservative	D.H. Thomas	170		
Liberal	W. de G. Warren	132		
Majority		38		
Conservative win (new seat)				

=== Carmarthen Western Ward (Upper Division) ===
Carmarthen Eastern Ward (Lower Division) 1889
Party	Candidate	Votes	%	±%
Liberal	D. Rixon Morgan	251		
Conservative	James Phillips	182		
Majority		69		
Liberal win (new seat)				

=== Cenarth ===
Cenarth 1889
Party	Candidate	Votes	%	±%
Liberal	Edward Davies	239		
Conservative	H.W.T. Howell	165		
Majority				
Liberal win (new seat)				

=== Cilycwm ===
Cilycwm 1889
Party	Candidate	Votes	%	±%
Liberal	Rev Thomas Evans	156		
Conservative	R. Campbell-Davys	137		
Liberal Unionist	D.G. Vaughan	63		
Majority		19		
Liberal win (new seat)				

=== Conwil ===
Conwil 1889
Party	Candidate	Votes	%	±%
Liberal	Charles Jones	265		
Conservative	Thomas Davies	121		
Majority		144		
Liberal win (new seat)				

=== Kidwelly ===
Kidwelly 1889
Party	Candidate	Votes	%	±%
Liberal	Daniel Stephens	135		
Liberal Unionist	T.W.A. Evans	85		
Conservative	D.J. John	28		
Majority		50		
Liberal win (new seat)				

=== Laugharne ===
Laugharne 1889
Party	Candidate	Votes	%	±%
Liberal	John D. Morse	145		
Conservative	E. Falkener	128		
Majority		17		
Liberal win (new seat)				

=== Llanarthney ===
Llanarthney 1889
Party	Candidate	Votes	%	±%
Conservative	Thomas Davies	217		
Liberal	Rev D.S. Davies	159		
Conservative	Rev R.G. Lawrence	62		
Majority		58		
Conservative win (new seat)				

=== Llandebie ===
Llandebie 1889
Party	Candidate	Votes	%	±%
Conservative	Lord Dynevor	260		
Liberal	David Richards	186		
Majority		74		
Conservative win (new seat)				

=== Llandilo Rural ===
Llandilo Rural 1889
Party	Candidate	Votes	%	±%
Liberal	Thomas Powell	351		
Conservative	Herbert Peel	202		
Majority		149		
Liberal win (new seat)				

=== Llandilo Urban ===
Llandilo Urban 1889
Party	Candidate	Votes	%	±%
Liberal	J.W. Gwynne Hughes	174		
Conservative	John Thomas	120		
Majority		54		
Liberal win (new seat)				

=== Llandovery ===
Llandovery 1889
Party	Candidate	Votes	%	±%
Conservative	Col. D.E. Jones	Unopposed		
Conservative win (new seat)				

=== Llanedy ===
Llanedy 1889
Party	Candidate	Votes	%	±%
Liberal	Evan Evans	Unopposed		
Liberal win (new seat)				

=== Llanegwad ===
Llanegwad 1889
Party	Candidate	Votes	%	±%
Liberal	H.J. Thomas	330		
Conservative	Henry Davies	109		
Conservative	A.W. Stokes	62		
Majority		221		
Liberal win (new seat)				

=== Llanelly Rural and Ward No.1 (six seats) ===
Llanelly Rural and Ward No.1 1889
Party	Candidate	Votes	%	±%
Liberal	Gwilym Evans	1,402		
Liberal	Joseph Mayberry	1,332		
Liberal	Henry Wilkins	1,330		
Liberal	Owen Bonville	1,234		
Liberal	Thomas Jenkins	1,212		
Liberal	Rev P. Phillips	1,139		
Independent	Hugh Nevill	776		
Conservative	James Buckley	756		
Conservative	Ernest Trubshaw	722		
Liberal win (new seat)				
Liberal win (new seat)				
Liberal win (new seat)				
Liberal win (new seat)				
Liberal win (new seat)				
Liberal win (new seat)				

=== Llanelly Ward No.2 (three seats) ===
Llanelly Ward No.2 1889
Party	Candidate	Votes	%	±%
Liberal	Thomas Phillips	774		
Liberal	W.J. Wilson	715		
Liberal	D.C. Parry	659		
Conservative	Dr Henry J. Buckley	553		
Liberal Unionist	John A. Williams	483		
Liberal win (new seat)				
Liberal win (new seat)				
Liberal win (new seat)				

=== Llanelly Ward No.3 (two seats) ===
Llanelly Ward No.3 1889
Party	Candidate	Votes	%	±%
Liberal	John Bourne	Unopposed		
Conservative	J.S. Tregoning	Unopposed		
Liberal win (new seat)				
Conservative win (new seat)				

=== Llanfihangel Aberbythick ===
Llanfihangel Aberbythick 1889
Party	Candidate	Votes	%	±%
Conservative	Viscount Emlyn	Unopposed		
Conservative win (new seat)				

=== Llanfihangel-ar-Arth ===
Llanfihangel-ar-Arth 1889
Party	Candidate	Votes	%	±%
Liberal	Evan Harries	Unopposed		
Liberal win (new seat)				

=== Llangadock ===
Llangadock 1889
Party	Candidate	Votes	%	±%
Liberal	James Jenkins	270		
Liberal	W.N. Lewis	213		
Majority		57		
Liberal win (new seat)				

=== Llangeler ===
Llangeler 1889
Party	Candidate	Votes	%	±%
Liberal	John Lewis	268		
Conservative	Arthur Howell Jones	260		
Majority		8		
Liberal win (new seat)				

=== Llangendeirne ===
Llangendeirne 1889
Party	Candidate	Votes	%	±%
Liberal	Evans	Unopposed		
Liberal win (new seat)				

=== Llangennech ===
Llangennech 1889
Party	Candidate	Votes	%	±%
Liberal	J. Glyn Thomas	202		
Conservative	Rev E.A. Davies	111		
Majority		91		
Liberal win (new seat)				

=== Llangunnor ===
Llangunnor 1889
Party	Candidate	Votes	%	±%
Liberal	C.E. Morris	190		
Conservative	David Evan Stephens	169		
Majority		21		
Liberal win (new seat)				

=== Llanon ===
Llanon 1889
Party	Candidate	Votes	%	±%
Liberal	Rev W.E. Evans	146		
Conservative	Major Edward Riley	90		
Majority		56		
Liberal win (new seat)				

=== Llansawel ===
Llansawel 1889
Party	Candidate	Votes	%	±%
Conservative	Sir J.H.W. Drummond, Bart.	Unopposed		
Conservative win (new seat)				

=== Llanstephan ===
Thomas Morris of Coomb was the son of William Morris, former Liberal MP for Carmarthen Boroughs.

Llanstephan 1889
Party	Candidate	Votes	%	±%
Liberal Unionist	Thomas Morris	197		
Liberal	John Johns	157		
Majority		40		
Liberal Unionist win (new seat)				

=== Llanybyther ===
Llanybyther 1889
Party	Candidate	Votes	%	±%
Conservative	Col. H. Davies-Evans	267		
Liberal	D.H. James	246		
Majority		21		
Conservative win (new seat)				

=== Mothvey ===
Mothvey 1889
Party	Candidate	Votes	%	±%
Liberal	George Jones	176		
Liberal	John Lewis	136		
Majority		40		
Liberal win (new seat)				

=== Pembrey (two seats) ===
Pembrey 1889
Party	Candidate	Votes	%	±%
Independent Liberal	W.J. Buckley	176		
Liberal	William Howell	460		
Liberal	Rev D. Evans	397		
Conservative	T. Williams	394		
Independent Liberal win (new seat)				
Liberal win (new seat)				

=== Quarter Bach ===
Quarter Bach 1889
Party	Candidate	Votes	%	±%
Liberal	Dr Howell Rees	Unopposed		
Liberal win (new seat)				

=== Rhydcymmerai ===
Rhydcymmerai 1889
Party	Candidate	Votes	%	±%
Liberal	Daniel Evans	165		
Liberal	Thomas Price	143		
Majority		22		
Liberal win (new seat)				

=== St Clears ===
St Clears 1889
Party	Candidate	Votes	%	±%
Liberal	T. Evans	Unopposed		
Liberal win (new seat)				

=== St Ishmael ===
J. Lewis Philipps of Bolahaul, near Carmarthen, had been a prominent figure in county government for many years and was chairman of the Carmarthen Board of Guardians from 1861 until 1884.

St Ishmael 1889
Party	Candidate	Votes	%	±%
Conservative	J. Lewis Philipps	203		
Liberal	Evan Stephens	180		
Majority		23		
Conservative win (new seat)				

=== Trelech ===
Trelech 1889
Party	Candidate	Votes	%	±%
Liberal	J. Davies	245		
Liberal	W. Phillips	181		
Conservative	D. Jones	108		
Majority		40		
Liberal win (new seat)				

=== Whitland and Llanboidy (two seats) ===
Whitland and Llanboidy 1889
Party	Candidate	Votes	%	±%
Liberal	Rev. William Thomas	582		
Liberal	John Llewelyn	452		
Liberal	J. Bagnall Evans	321		
Conservative	J. Beynon	206		
Liberal win (new seat)				
Liberal win (new seat)				

== Election of Aldermen ==
In addition to the 51 councillors the council consisted of 17 county aldermen. Aldermen were elected by the council, and served a six-year term. Following the election of the initial sixteen aldermen, half of the aldermanic bench would be elected every three years following the triennial council election. After the initial elections, there were seventeen aldermanic vacancies and the following aldermen were appointed by the newly elected council (with the number of votes cast recorded in each case). A second vote was held to determine which aldermen should retire in three years.

Elected for six years

- John James, Llandovery (from outside the Council) 40
- W.O. Brigstocke JP, Liberal (from outside the Council) 38
- David Randell MP, Liberal (from outside the Council) 38
- Dr J.A. Jones, Llanelly, Liberal (from outside the Council) 37
- H. Nevill, Llanelli, Conservative (from outside the Council) 36
- T. Williams, Llwynhendy, Liberal (from outside the Council) 33
- D. Richards, Ammanford, Liberal (defeated candidate at Llandebie) 30
- Joseph Joseph, Liberal (from outside the Council) 27
- W.R. Edwards, Carmarthen, Liberal (from outside the Council)

Elected for three years

- Col. Gwynnne Hughes JP, Liberal (from outside the Council) 36
- J. Lewis Philipps, Carmarthen, Conservative (elected councillor for St Ishmaels) 35
- Sir James Hills-Johnes, Conservative (defeated candidate at Caeo) 35
- W. de G. Warren, Tenby, Liberal (from outside the Council) 34
- Robert Scourfield, Llanstephan, Liberal (from outside the Council) 33
- D. Bowen, Llandeilo, Liberal (from outside the Council) 32
- J. Bagnall Evans JP, Liberal (defeated candidate at Whitland and Llanboidy) 31
- D. James, Bailibedw, Liberal (from outside the Council) 31

As in Cardiganshire the Liberals agreed that the Conservatives be allocated three aldermanic seats only. Only John Lewis Philipps was an elected member of the council.

Initially, Lewis Morris had been elected an alderman but he declined on the basis that he had no sufficient time at his disposal. He was then replaced by W.R. Edwards at the second meeting of the council.

== Aldermanic Vacanies, 1889-1892 ==
David Bowen died a few weeks after his election as alderman, The council resolved to replace him with another representative from the Llandeilo area to serve for the remainder of the three-year term.

- Morgan Davies, Llandeilo, Liberal (from outside the Council)

Two vacancies arose in early 1891 following the resignation of W de G Warren and the death of J. Lewis Philipps. The vacancies were filled as follows:

- C.E. Morris, Liberal (elected member for Llangunnor)
- David Evans, Llanelli, Liberal

As a result of these changes there was one additional Liberal alderman at the expense of the Conservatives.

Morgan Davies died in February 1892, shortly before the end of his term as alderman.

== By-elections, 1889-1892 ==
=== St Ishmaels by-election, 1889 ===
In contrast to the position in other counties only one by-election was caused by the election of aldermen. This was in St Ishmaels where, following the election of John Lewis Philipps as an alderman the Liberal candidate captured the seat after a contest that took place in heavy snow.

St Ishmaels by-election 1889
Party	Candidate	Votes	%	±%
Liberal	J. Lloyd Thomas	276		
Conservative	D.T. Morris	98		

=== Llanarthney by-election, 1889 ===
Thomas Davies, Bremenda, the member for Llanarthney, died in August 1889 as a result of injuries sustained falling off his horse. Rev R.G. Lawrence of Middleton Hall, an unsuccessful candidate at the election held earlier in the year was returned unopposed.

Llanarthney by-election 1889
Party	Candidate	Votes	%	±%
Conservative	Rev R.G. Lawrence	Unopposed	N/A	N/A

=== Pembrey by-election, 1890 ===
A by-election arose in the Pembrey ward following the appointment of William Howell as returning officer for the county.

=== Carmarthen Western Ward (Upper Division) by-election, 1890 ===
D. Rixon Morgan, the sitting member, resigned late in 1890. Professor D.E. Jones of the Presbyterian College, Carmarthen, was chosen as his replacement as Liberal candidate.

Carmarthen Eastern Ward (Lower Division) by-election, 1890
Party	Candidate	Votes	%	±%
Liberal	Professor D.E. Jones	Unopposed	N/A	N/A
Liberal hold				
