= Henry Jones-Davies (cricketer) =

English cricketer

Personal information
- Full name: Henry Mydrian Orford Jones-Davies
- Born: 21 October 1912; Portsmouth, Hampshire, England
- Died: 30 October 1976 (aged 65); Fairford, Gloucestershire, England
- Batting: Right-handed
- Bowling: Right-arm fast-medium

Domestic team information
- Years: Team
- 1932: Oxford University

Career statistics
Competition	First-class
Matches	1
Runs scored	4
Batting average	4.00
100s/50s	–/–
Top score	4*
Balls bowled	66
Wickets	0
Bowling average	–
5 wickets in innings	–
10 wickets in match	–
Best bowling	–
Catches/stumpings	1/–
- Source: Cricinfo, 15 May 2020

Henry Mydrian Orford Jones-Davies (21 October 1912 – 30 October 1976) was an English first-class cricketer and British Army officer.

Jones-Davies was born at Portsmouth in October 1912. He later studied at Keble College at the University of Oxford, where he made a single appearance in first-class cricket for Oxford University against Lancashire at Oxford in 1932. Batting twice in the match, he was dismissed without scoring in the Oxford first innings by Frank Sibbles, while in their second innings he was unbeaten on 4 runs.

After graduating from Oxford, Jones-Davies enlisted into the British Army where he was commissioned in July 1934 as a second lieutenant in the Royal Artillery. He was promoted to lieutenant in February 1936, with him later serving in the Second World War and being promoted to captain in February 1941. Following the war, he was promoted to major in July 1946. Jones-Davies retired from active service in September 1955, retaining the rank of major. He died in October 1976 at Fairford, Gloucestershire.
