= William Nathaniel Jones =

British politician (1858–1934)

William Nathaniel Jones, commonly known as W.N. Jones, (20 March 1858 – 24 May 1934) was a Welsh Liberal politician, businessman and soldier.

Jones, who served as a Justice of the Peace in Carmarthenshire, married Margaret Francis of Llandeilo. In business, he was a director of the Ammanford Gas Company and the Duke Anthracite Collieries Ltd and the owner of Birchgrove Steelworks, Swansea. He was appointed High Sheriff of Carmarthenshire for 1924.

In 1889, Jones became an inaugural member of the Carmarthenshire County Council. He also served on Ammanford Urban District Council.

== Parliamentary candidate ==
In 1926, Sir Alfred Mond the Liberal MP for Carmarthen defected to the Conservatives over the issue of land policy and the proposal by David Lloyd George that some agricultural land be nationalised. The policy had been set out in the publication Land and the Nation or the Green Book in October 1925 but it caused great debate in the Liberal Party and another MP, Hilton Young, who sat for Norwich also left the party for the Tories along with a couple of former MPs. Mond decided not to resign and fight a by-election but there was an election to choose a successor to him to stand as a Liberal at the next election. This was initially contested by six candidates but four withdrew and the choice was between Jones and Richard Thomas Evans of Cardiff. Jones won in a close contest by 149 votes to 147, having made clear he was an opponent of the Green Book land policy whereas Evans, who had worked closely with Lloyd George on other Liberal policies, was in favour. Evans however was later become MP for Carmarthen, sitting from 1931 to 1935. At the time of the by-election, and in other sources referring to him in 1882, Jones was described variously as Lieutenant-Colonel or Colonel Jones but no indication of his army history is available in those sources.

== Carmarthen by-election, 1928 ==
In the event Jones did not have to wait until the next general election as Mond accepted a peerage in 1928 and caused a by-election in Carmarthen. At the previous general election in 1924 the Conservatives had not fielded a candidate and Mond had won easily in a straight fight with Labour. However this time, they put up the barrister, Sir Courtenay Mansel, another escapee from the Liberal Party in 1926 who had been MP for Penryn and Falmouth from 1922 to 1923 but who had local connections in Carmarthenshire and was also a Justice of the Peace there. The Labour candidate was the Welsh barrister (and future MP) Dan Hopkin. There was briefly the prospect of a four-cornered contest when the National Party of Wales announced their intention to stand a candidate but in the end they decided not to fight. The by-election took place on 28 June 1928 and Jones emerged as the narrow winner. Jones had made his opposition to the land policy a feature of the campaign in an attempt to retain the support of the division's farmers, many of whom shared Mond's concern about the nationalisation proposals. In any event the Green Book had by this time been withdrawn as a full statement of Liberal land policy. Instead, Jones promoted as the main object of Liberal land policy the desire to give security of tenure to tenant farmers. Many of those reliant on the land for their livelihood seemed to prefer the less radical solution of the government of Stanley Baldwin for the relief of rates on agricultural land.

== Polling ==
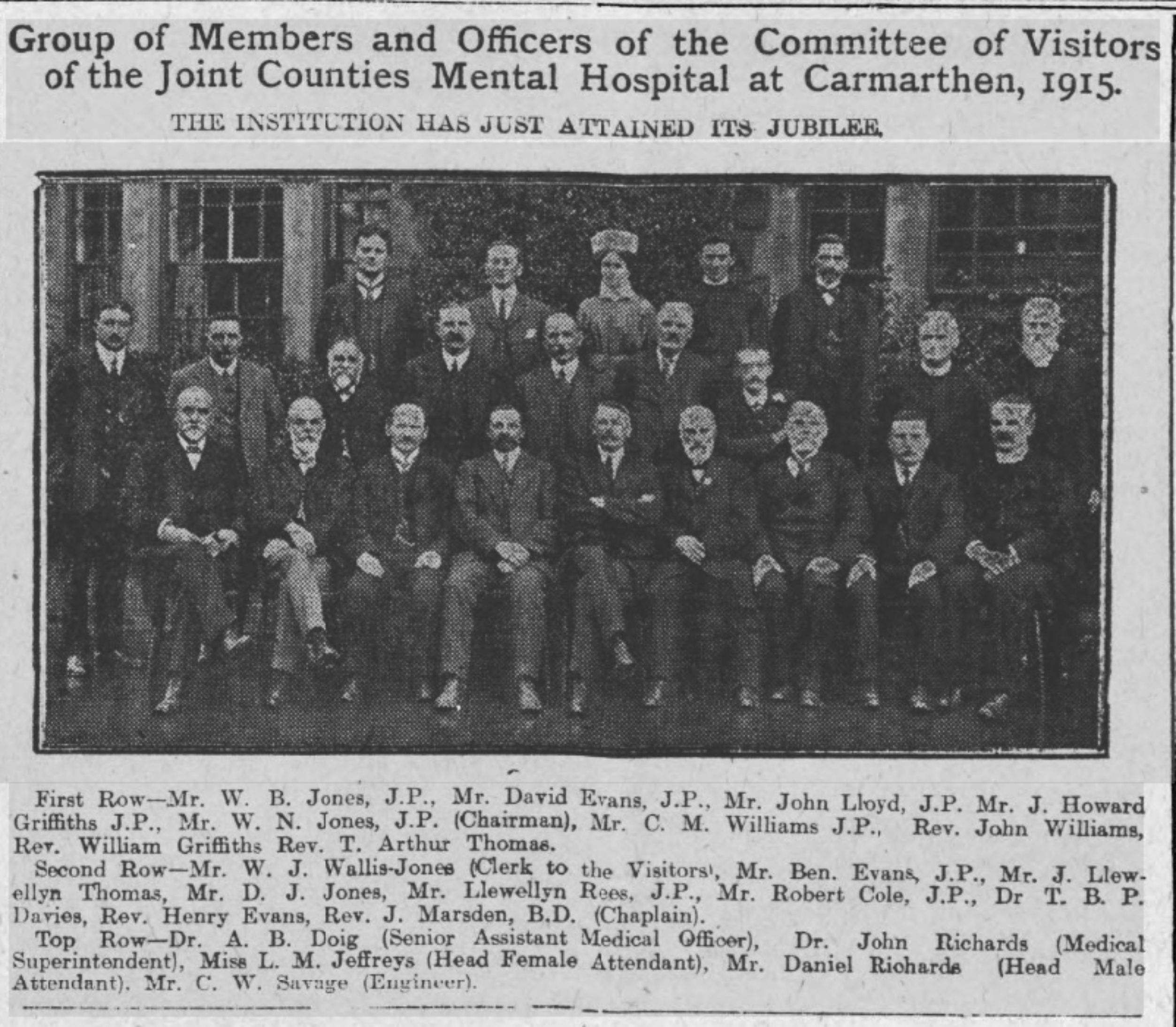
Carmarthen Mental Hospital Committee (1915) Jones seated in the exact middle of the front row with arms folded across his waist

Polling day itself was affected by bad weather with heavy rain dampening the candidates’ enthusiasm on the day and, it was reported, having a detrimental effect on turnout. However the official figures showed a turnout of 76.6% an improvement over the previous general election when only 68% had turned out to vote. In the end, Jones had majority of just 47 votes over his Labour opponent, polling 10,201 to Hopkins's 10,154 with Mansel for the Tories on 8,361. The drastic reduction in the size of the majority, even taking into account the fact that the Tories contested the seat, was a disappointment to the Liberals. Perhaps Liberal supporters felt they had been taken for granted by their party. Of their two previous MPs one had resigned to cause a by-election to find a seat for Sir Alfred Mond and then Mond himself had defected to the Tories without standing down to seek a mandate for his new party.

== Later elections ==
The by-election did presage a change in political fortunes in the constituency. At the 1929 general election Jones lost the seat to Dan Hopkin in another three-cornered fight. Evans regained it for the Liberals in 1931 but lost to Hopkin in 1935. The seat returned to the Liberals in 1945 when it was won by Sir Rhys Hopkin Morris but was recaptured for Labour in 1957 at the by-election which was caused by Hopkin Morris’ death; the successful Labour candidate being Lady Megan Lloyd George who had herself defected from Liberal to Labour.

== Death ==
Jones died suddenly at Llanwrtyd Wells on 24 May 1934, aged 76. He died intestate, leaving an estate of gross value £75,950.

== Other sources ==
- Who was Who, OUP 2007
- Ammanford, Carmarthenshire web site – An Aberlash Millionaire at www.terrynorm.ic24.net An Aberlash Millionaire: The Rags To Riches Life of David Davies, Aberlash

Parliament of the United Kingdom
Preceded by Alfred Mond	Member of Parliament for Carmarthen; 1928 – 1929	Succeeded by Daniel Hopkin
