= Sir James Williams-Drummond, 4th Baronet =

Sir James Hamlyn Williams Williams-Drummond (13 January 1857 - 15 June 1913) was a Welsh landowner who served as Lord Lieutenant of Carmarthenshire from 1898 until his death in 1913.

Williams-Drummond was born on 13 January 1857, the eldest son of Sir James Drummond and his wife Mary Eleanor, daughter of Sir James Hamlyn-Williams of Edwinsford, former MP for Carmarthenshire.

Having inherited the baronetcy at a young age in 1865, Williams-Drummond served as High Sheriff of Carmarthenshire before being elected unopposed as a member of Carmarthenshire County Council in 1889, representing Llansawel and Talley. He retained his seat unopposed until his death. in 1898 he succeeded Earl Cawdor as Lord Lieutenant of Carmarthenshire.

Williams-Drummond was a staunch Conservative and at the time of his death was president of the West Carmarthenshire Conservative Association.

On 30 June 1888, he married Madelin Diana Elizabeth, daughter of Sir Andrew Agnew, who predeceased him in 1907.

Williams-Drummond died at Edwinsford, after a short illness, on 15 June 1913. His funeral at Talley Church was attended by most of the county's landowners and many public figures.
