= 1945–1972 Carmarthen Borough Council elections =

English council elections

Carmarthen Borough Council was a local authority created by the 1835 Municipal Corporations Act and replaced the ancient borough that had existed since medieval times. The Council consisted of 24 members, eighteen of whom were elected councillors and the remaining six were aldermen. The councillors were elected on a triennial cycle, with a third of councillors retiring each year. Aldermen were elected for a six-year term from within the council membership.

During the period between 1919 and 1939, the Council had an Independent majority but with Labour candidates gaining ground.

== 1945 Carmarthen Borough Council election ==
At the first post-war election, held a few months after the armistice, nine seats were contested after half the council membership along with three aldermen stood down. Three sitting members were defeated, including William Henry Evans, a retiring alderman and a member sonce 1929.

=== Eastern Ward (five seats) ===
Eastern Ward 1945
| Party | Candidate | Votes | % | ±% |
|---|---|---|---|---|
| Labour | David Owen** | 2,382 | | |
| Labour | Herbert Morgan* | 1,894 | | |
| Labour | G.V. Davies | 1,469 | | |
| Independent | John Treharne | 1,440 | | |
| Independent | H.E. Ellis* | 1,435 | | |
| Independent | Alice K. White | 1,419 | | |
| Labour | William Henry Evans** | 1,398 | | |
| Labour | T.J. Thomas | 1,245 | | |
| Independent | D. Morgan | 577 | | |

=== Western Ward (four seats) ===
Western Ward 1945
| Party | Candidate | Votes | % | ±% |
|---|---|---|---|---|
| Independent | John Verdi Jenkins | 1,337 | | |
| Labour | W.D. Jones* | 1,305 | | |
| Independent | William Jones** | 998 | | |
| British Legion | D.H. Davies | 973 | | |
| Independent | T.H. Lewis* | 935 | | |
| Labour | D.O. John | 928 | | |
| Labour | W.C. Ferman | 903 | | |
| Labour | G.W. Ralphs | 787 | | |
| Independent | W.J. Lovell* | 607 | | |
| Independent | E.J. Davies | 603 | | |

=== By-elections ===
At the statutory meeting on 9 November, John Jenkins was invested as the first Labour mayor of Carmarthen. Enoch Davies, Thomas Davies and Herbert Morgan were elected aldermen. At the ensuing by-elections, Independent candidates headed the poll in both wards but William Henry Evans won back the seat he lost at the recent election. The election was also notable for the fact that a Communist candidate stood and gained over 600 votes.

=== Eastern Ward by-election (two seats) ===
Eastern Ward by-election 1945
| Party | Candidate | Votes | % | ±% |
|---|---|---|---|---|
| Independent | Alice K. White | 1,397 | | |
| Labour | William Henry Evans | 1,014 | | |
| Labour | T.J. Thomas | 828 | | |
| Communist | E. Harries | 696 | | |

=== Western Ward by-election (one seat) ===
Western Ward by-election 1945
| Party | Candidate | Votes | % | ±% |
|---|---|---|---|---|
| Independent | D. Stanley Davies | 1,627 | | |
| Labour | B.O. John | 778 | | |

== 1946 Carmarthen Borough Council election ==
A slate of Labour candidates challenged the Indepednents at this election. Three sitting Independents stood down, including J. Islwyn Davies, a member since 1930, and there was an additional vacancy in the Eastern Ward following the resignation of H.E. Ellis, who had moved to Brecon. Labour won an additional two seats, including the first Labour woman member. The successful Independents included former mayor Thomas Lloyd, a member since 1920.

=== Eastern Ward (four seats) ===
Eastern Ward 1946
| Party | Candidate | Votes | % | ±% |
|---|---|---|---|---|
| Labour | John Jenkins* | 1,949 | | |
| Independent | D.H. Jones* | 1,675 | | |
| Labour | Thomas J. Thomas | 1,213 | | |
| Labour | Nancy Jeffreys-Jones | 1,132 | | |
| Independent | J.J. Lewis | 1,073 | | |
| Independent | Gordon Selby Davies | 1,069 | | |
| Labour | J.E. Hughes | 947 | | |
| Independent | David Morgan | 819 | | |

=== Western Ward (three seats) ===
Western Ward 1946
| Party | Candidate | Votes | % | ±% |
|---|---|---|---|---|
| Independent | Charles W. Griffiths | 1,625 | | |
| Independent | Thomas Lloyd* | 1,455 | | |
| Independent | Cliff C. Davies | 1,079 | | |
| Labour | E.F. Bennett | 711 | | |
| Labour | Ivor M. Morris | 676 | | |
| Independent | R.P. Jones | 649 | | |

== 1947 Carmarthen Borough Council election ==
In addition to the six seats which were up for election a seventh vacancy was created due to the elevation of D.H. Jones to the aldermanic bench.

The Independents won a seat from Labour in the Eastern Ward while the reverse happened in the Western Ward, leaving the composition of the Council unchanged. The two defeated retiring members were G.V. Davies (Labour) and D.H. Davies (British Legion), the latter had originally been selected as an Independent.

=== Eastern Ward (four seats) ===
Eastern Ward 1947
| Party | Candidate | Votes | % | ±% |
|---|---|---|---|---|
| Independent | John D. Treharne* | 1,540 | | |
| Independent | Gordon Selby Davies | 1,471 | | |
| Independent | John J. Lewis | 1,389 | | |
| Labour | Nancy Jeffreys-Jones* | 1,376 | | |
| Labour | George V. Davies* | 1,342 | | |
| Labour | Ivor M. Morris | 978 | | |
| Labour | A.P. Thomas | 794 | | |

=== Western Ward (three seats) ===
Western Ward 1947
| Party | Candidate | Votes | % | ±% |
|---|---|---|---|---|
| Independent | John Owen Morgans* | 1,570 | | |
| Independent | William Jones* | 1,271 | | |
| Labour | Dr A.M. Spencer | 1,256 | | |
| British Legion | D.H. Davies* | 1,021 | | |
| Labour | E. Bennett | 771 | | |
| Independent | William Davies | 592 | | |

== 1949 Carmarthen Borough Council election ==
No election was held in 1948 following a decision to move the annual election from November to April. Shortly after the closure of nominations, the election in the Eastern Ward was postponed following the death of the borough sherriff, David Stanley Davies, who was one of the candidates.

== 1950 Carmarthen Borough Council election ==
Nine candidates contested the six vacancies across the two wards. Labour gained one seat from the Independents.

=== Eastern Ward (five seats) ===
Eastern Ward 1950
| Party | Candidate | Votes | % | ±% |
|---|---|---|---|---|
| Independent | C. Dathan Davies | 1,948 | | |
| Labour | Thomas J. Thomas* | 1,440 | | |
| Independent | Alice K. White | 1,343 | | |
| Labour | T. Idwal Jones | 1,181 | | |

=== Western Ward (four seats) ===
Western Ward 1950
| Party | Candidate | Votes | % | ±% |
|---|---|---|---|---|
| Independent | Charles W. Griffiths* | 1,436 | | |
| Labour | John H, Evans | 972 | | |
| Independent | Cliff C. Davies* | 897 | | |
| Independent | Margaret M. Mitchell | 854 | | |
| Independent | D.H. Davies* | 843 | | |

== 1951 Carmarthen Borough Council election ==
Twelve candidates contested the six vacancies across the two wards.

=== Eastern Ward (three seats) ===
Eastern Ward 1951
| Party | Candidate | Votes | % | ±% |
|---|---|---|---|---|
| Independent | Sidney Jeremy | 1,636 | | |
| Labour | T. Idwal Jones* | 1,515 | | |
| Independent | J.J. Lewis* | 1,299 | | |
| Independent | Gordon Selby Davies* | 1,205 | | |
| Labour | J.M. Harding | 865 | | |

=== Western Ward (three seats) ===
Western Ward 1951
| Party | Candidate | Votes | % | ±% |
|---|---|---|---|---|
| Labour | Ellis J. Powell | 1,148 | | |
| Independent | Denzil Harries | 1,101 | | |
| Independent | William Edwards* | 990 | | |
| Independent | W.D. Jones | 930 | | |
| Independent | William Jones* | 919 | | |
| Independent | Marjorie Mitchell | 871 | | |
| Independent | D.H. Davies | 415 | | |

== 1952 Carmarthen Borough Council election ==
Nine candidates contested the six vacancies, with five Labour candidates being successful.

=== Eastern Ward (three seats) ===
Eastern Ward 1952
| Party | Candidate | Votes | % | ±% |
|---|---|---|---|---|
| Labour | David Owen* | 1,892 | | |
| Labour | C.C. Jones* | 1,627 | | |
| Labour | Herbert Morgan* | 1,518 | | |
| Independent | Gordon Selby Davies | 1,280 | | |
| Independent | Marjorie Mitchell | 956 | | |

=== Western Ward (three seats) ===
Western Ward 1952
| Party | Candidate | Votes | % | ±% |
|---|---|---|---|---|
| Labour | M.E. Clifford Jones* | 1,909 | | |
| Labour | W.D. Jones* | 1,510 | | |
| Independent | W.D. Jones | 1,149 | | |
| Independent | L.G. Rees | 838 | | |

Following the elevation of three councillors to the aldermanic bench, by-elections were held. Retiring alderman David Howell Jones, a member of the council for seventeen years, but who did not contest the recent election, was among those returned.

=== Eastern Ward by-election (two seats) ===
Eastern Ward 1952
| Party | Candidate | Votes | % | ±% |
|---|---|---|---|---|
| Independent | Gordon Selby Davies | 1,252 | | |
| Independent | David Howell Jones* | 1,107 | | |
| Labour | John Miles Harries | 821 | | |

=== Western Ward by-election (one seat) ===
Western Ward 1952
| Party | Candidate | Votes | % | ±% |
|---|---|---|---|---|
| Labour | Elwyn John | 893 | | |
| Independent | George Leonard Rees | 823 | | |

== 1953 Carmarthen Borough Council election ==
For the first time since the Second World War there was an unopposed return in a municipal election as the Western Ward was not contested. Ex-servicemen candidates (Wynford Davies and R.C. Hopkins) were elected in each ward.

=== Eastern Ward (three seats) ===
Eastern Ward 1953
| Party | Candidate | Votes | % | ±% |
|---|---|---|---|---|
| Independent | R.C. Hopkins | 1,339 | | |
| Independent | John Murray | 1,290 | | |
| Independent | Alice K. White* | 1,136 | | |
| Labour | Ivor Morris | 1,126 | | |

=== Western Ward (three seats) ===
Western Ward 1953
| Party | Candidate | Votes | % | ±% |
|---|---|---|---|---|
| Independent | Wynford Davies | Unopposed | | |
| Labour | John H. Evans* | Unopposed | | |
| Independent | M. Marjorie Mitchell | Unopposed | | |

== 1954 Carmarthen Borough Council election ==
For the second successive year, there was no contest in the Western Ward after sitting member William Edwards (who had lost his seat on Carmarthenshire County Council in 1952) chose not to seek re-election. After a contest in the Eastern Ward the composition of the council remained at 14 Independents (including two elected as Ex-Servicemen) and 10 Labour members.

=== Eastern Ward (three seats) ===
Eastern Ward 1954
| Party | Candidate | Votes | % | ±% |
|---|---|---|---|---|
| Independent | John James Lewis* | 1,542 | | |
| Independent | Sidney Jeremy* | 1,532 | | |
| Labour | T. Idwal Jones* | 1,275 | | |
| Independent | T. Keble Morgan | 1,216 | | |
| Labour | William Colvin | 983 | | |

=== Western Ward (three seats) ===
Western Ward 1954
| Party | Candidate | Votes | % | ±% |
|---|---|---|---|---|
| Independent | D. Denzil Harries | Unopposed | | |
| Independent | David Thomas Jenkins | Unopposed | | |
| Labour | Ellis J. Powell* | Unopposed | | |

== 1955 Carmarthen Borough Council election ==
For the first time in the post-war period there was no contested election at Carmarthen as six candidates were returned unopposed. These included Charlie Griffiths who resigned from the aldermanic bench in order to be returned as a councillor.

=== Eastern Ward (three seats) ===
Eastern Ward 1955
| Party | Candidate | Votes | % | ±% |
|---|---|---|---|---|
| Independent | Gordon Selby Davies* | Unopposed | | |
| Labour | C.C. Jones* | Unopposed | | |
| Labour | Herbert Morgan* | Unopposed | | |

=== Western Ward (three seats) ===
Western Ward 1952
| Party | Candidate | Votes | % | ±% |
|---|---|---|---|---|
| Independent | C.W. Griffiths** | Unopposed | | |
| Labour | Elwyn John | Unopposed | | |
| Labour | M.E. Clifford Jones* | Unopposed | | |

Following the elevation of three councillors to the aldermanic bench, by-elections were held. Two Labour candidates were returned unopposed but retiring alderman J.O. Morgans, a member of the council for 36 years, faced a tough contest to retain his seat.

=== Eastern Ward (two seats) ===
Eastern Ward 1955 by-election
| Party | Candidate | Votes | % | ±% |
|---|---|---|---|---|
| Labour | William Colvin | Unopposed | | |
| Labour | Ivor Morris | Unopposed | | |

=== Western Ward (one seat) ===
Western Ward 1955 by-election
| Party | Candidate | Votes | % | ±% |
|---|---|---|---|---|
| Independent | J.O. Morgans** | 954 | | |
| Independent | T. Keble Morgan | 754 | | |

== 1956 Carmarthen Borough Council election ==
The Western Ward was uncontested for the second consecutive year. In the contested Eastern Ward, Labour gained a seat from the Independents.

=== Eastern Ward (three seats) ===
Eastern Ward 1953
| Party | Candidate | Votes | % | ±% |
|---|---|---|---|---|
| Independent | John Murray* | 1,056 | | |
| Independent | Alice K. White* | 887 | | |
| Labour | T.H. Gwynne Davies | 875 | | |
| Independent | R.C. Hopkins* | 831 | | |
| Labour | Reginald Johns | 776 | | |

== 1957 Carmarthen Borough Council election ==
On this occasion there was no contest in the Eastern Ward and the three sitting members were returned unopposed. In the Western Ward a sitting Independent member was defeated by another Independent.

=== Eastern Ward (three seats) ===
Eastern Ward 1957
| Party | Candidate | Votes | % | ±% |
|---|---|---|---|---|
| Independent | Sidney Jeremy* | Unopposed | | |
| Labour | T. Idwal Jones* | Unopposed | | |
| Labour | Ivor Morris* | Unopposed | | |

=== Western Ward (three seats) ===
Western Ward 1957
| Party | Candidate | Votes | % | ±% |
|---|---|---|---|---|
| Independent | D. Denzil Harries | 1,209 | | |
| Independent | T.Ll. Jones | 1,190 | | |
| Labour | Ellis J. Powell* | 1,028 | | |
| Independent | David Thomas Jenkins* | 913 | | |

== 1959 Carmarthen Borough Council election ==
Both wards were contested with a total of thirteen candidates. Two vacancies in the Eastern Ward resulted in a total of eight councillors being elected, amounting to almost half the number of elected members. The Ratepayers Association ran a slate of candidates; three of whom were elected.

=== Eastern Ward (five seats) ===
Eastern Ward 1959
| Party | Candidate | Votes | % | ±% |
|---|---|---|---|---|
| Labour | R.E. Rees* | 1,744 | | |
| Labour | T.H. Gwynne Davies | 1,709 | | |
| Labour | J.D. Davies | 1,580 | | |
| Labour | D.C.H. Pullen | 1,540 | | |
| Ratepayers | Mrs V.M. Chapman | 1,432 | | |
| Ratepayers | J.A. Hillman | 1,377 | | |
| Labour | J. McMeel | 1,307 | | |
| Ratepayers | R. Summers | 1,232 | | |

=== Western Ward (three seats) ===
Western Ward 1953
| Party | Candidate | Votes | % | ±% |
|---|---|---|---|---|
| Independent | Wynford Davies* | 1,211 | | |
| Ratepayers | Thomas McCall | 975 | | |
| Ratepayers | Leslie H. Howells | 906 | | |
| Labour | D. Norman Richards | 762 | | |
| Independent | M. Marjorie Mitchell* | 685 | | |
