= 1949 Carmarthenshire County Council election =

Welsh local election

An election to the Carmarthenshire County Council was held on 5 April 1949. It was preceded by the 1946 election and followed, by the 1952 election.

== Overview of the result ==
After steadily increasing their representation throughout the inter-war period, the Labour Party finally won a majority on the Council, and strengthened their hold by taking nine of the ten vacancies on the aldermanic bench. Labour victories included taking a seat in the Borough of Carmarthen for the first time.

== Boundary changes ==
There were no boundary changes.

== Candidates ==
There were a number of unopposed returns, both in Labour held seats and in the western part of the county, which was described as still being 'traditionally Liberal in character'. Gwynfor Evans, President of Plaid Cymru, was returned for the Llangadog ward, having been defeated by one vote in 1946.

This was the second election held since a new ruling requiring retiring aldermen to face the electorate was introduced. Much attention focused on the contest in the Llangendeirne ward where Alderman James Jenkins, leader of the Independent group, faced the sitting Labour member, the Rev. R.G. James. In Llanelli, Dame Gwendoline Trubshaw, a member of the council since 1919, faced Labour opposition. Her fellow Independent, Daniel Roberts, retired and the decision of two Independent candidates to contest Ward One was described as 'unfortunate'. Three other Independent aldermen stood down. At Llanarthney, David Stephens, who had last contested an election in 1931, did not challenge Labour member Edgar Lewis who was returned unopposed. David Davies (Abergwili) and Lewis Bowen (Trelech) chose not to opposed the sitting Independents in their former wards.

== Outcome ==
While there were more unopposed returns than in 1946, many wards were keenly contested and the result was a narrow Labour majority amongst the elected members. Electioneering reached a peak in Llanelli where an Independent association was formed to fight the elections as a united front against Labour. However, Labour won all but two seats in Llanelli town. The exceptions were Ward One, where the intervention of former councillor James Jones split the Independent vote and Ward Five, where Dame Gwendolone Trubshaw withstood a Labour challenge.

Retiring aldermen faced the electorate for the first time since 1937. In Llangyndeyrn, Alderman Rev. James Jenkins, a member of the Council since 1925, was defeated by the retiring Labour councillor. In Carmarthen, George V. Davies, a former borough councillor, narrowly defeated 82 year-old William Jones to secure the first Labour victory in the town.

== Ward results ==
=== Abergwili ===
Abergwili 1949
Party	Candidate	Votes	%	±%
Independent	Col. Grismond P. Philipps*	631		
Labour	David John Evans	399		
Majority				
Independent hold		Swing		

=== Ammanford No.1 ===
Ammanford No.1 1949
Party	Candidate	Votes	%	±%
Labour	Haydn Lewis*	Unopposed		
Labour hold		Swing		

=== Ammanford No.2 ===
Boundary Change.

Ammanford No.2 1949
Party	Candidate	Votes	%	±%
Labour	John Harries*	Unopposed		
Labour hold		Swing		

=== Berwick ===
Berwick 1949
Party	Candidate	Votes	%	±%
Labour	Thomas Sidney Bowen*	1,172		
Independent	William John Thomas	743		
Independent	Elvet Pugh	155		
Majority				
Labour hold		Swing		

=== Burry Port ===
Burry Port 1949
Party	Candidate	Votes	%	±%
Labour	Edward Lewis*	1,525		
Independent	Archibald Edgar Morgan	714		
Majority				
Labour hold		Swing		

=== Caio ===
Caio 1949
Party	Candidate	Votes	%	±%
Independent	Thomas Davies*	685		
Independent	Frank Wolsely Armitage	271		
Majority				
Independent hold		Swing		

=== Carmarthen Division 1 ===
Carmarthen Division 1 1949
Party	Candidate	Votes	%	±%
Labour	George V. Davies	769		
Independent	William Jones*	736		
Independent Labour	D.W. Davies	49		
Majority				
Labour gain from Independent		Swing		

=== Carmarthen Division 2 ===
Carmarthen Division 2 1949
Party	Candidate	Votes	%	±%
Independent	J.O. Morgans*	unopposed		
Independent hold		Swing		

=== Carmarthen Division 3 ===
Carmarthen Division 3 1949
Party	Candidate	Votes	%	±%
Independent	J. Verdi Jenkins*	700		
Labour	W.D. Jones	575		
Majority				
Independent hold		Swing		

=== Cenarth ===
Cenarth 1949
Party	Candidate	Votes	%	±%
Independent	D.J. James Jones*	Unopposed		
Independent hold		Swing		

=== Cilycwm ===
Cilycwm 1949
Party	Candidate	Votes	%	±%
Independent	J.A. Owen*	Unopposed		
Independent hold		Swing		

=== Conwil ===
Conwil 1949
Party	Candidate	Votes	%	±%
Independent	William Howell Phillips*	Unopposed		
Independent hold		Swing		

=== Cwmamman ===
Cwmamman 1949
Party	Candidate	Votes	%	±%
Labour	David Davies*	Unopposed		
Labour hold		Swing		

=== Hengoed ===
Hengoed 1949
Party	Candidate	Votes	%	±%
Labour	David John Stone*	1,312		
Independent	Sydney Phillip James	393		
Majority				
Labour hold		Swing		

=== Kidwelly ===
Kidwelly 1946
Party	Candidate	Votes	%	±%
Labour	J. Amos Jones*	869		
Independent	David Phillips	626		
Majority				
Labour hold		Swing		

=== Laugharne ===
Laugharne 1949
Party	Candidate	Votes	%	±%
Independent	Rev. Chancellor S.B. Williams*	689		
Labour	W.J. John	497		
Majority				
Independent hold		Swing		

=== Llanarthney ===
Llanarthney 1949
Party	Candidate	Votes	%	±%
Labour	W. Edgar Lewis*	Unopposed		
Labour hold		Swing		

=== Llanboidy ===
Llanboidy 1949
Party	Candidate	Votes	%	±%
Independent	William Joshua Phillips*	Unopposed		
Independent hold		Swing		

=== Llandebie North ===
Llandebie North 1949
Party	Candidate	Votes	%	±%
Labour	Gwilym R. Thomas*	Unopposed		
Labour hold		Swing		

=== Llandebie South ===
Llandebie South 1949
Party	Candidate	Votes	%	±%
Labour	Evan Bevan*	Unopposed		
Labour hold		Swing		

=== Llandilo Rural ===
Llandilo Rural 1949
Party	Candidate	Votes	%	±%
Independent	William John Thomas*	Unopposed		
Independent hold		Swing		

=== Llandilo Urban ===
Llandilo Urban 1949
Party	Candidate	Votes	%	±%
Independent	James Morgan Davies*	866		
Labour	E. Gwyn Williams	224		
Majority				
Independent hold		Swing		

=== Llandovery ===
Llandovery 1949
Party	Candidate	Votes	%	±%
Independent	Anthony H. Gower*	564		
Independent	James James	412		
Majority				
Independent hold		Swing		

=== Llandyssilio ===
Llandyssilio 1949
Party	Candidate	Votes	%	±%
Independent	Hugh Davies	Unopposed		
Independent hold		Swing		

=== Llanedy ===
Llanedy 1949
Party	Candidate	Votes	%	±%
Labour	Thomas William Morgan*	Unopposed		
Labour hold		Swing		

=== Llanegwad ===
Llanegwad 1949
Party	Candidate	Votes	%	±%
Independent	Griffith Evans*	Unopposed		
Independent hold		Swing		

=== Llanelly Division 1 ===
Llanelly Division 1 1949
Party	Candidate	Votes	%	±%
Labour	Rev David Penry Jones*	1,016		
Independent	Henry Richards	764		
Independent	James Jones	222		
Majority				
Labour hold		Swing		

=== Llanelly Division 2 ===
Llanelly Division 2 1949
Party	Candidate	Votes	%	±%
Labour	William T. Griffiths*	976		
Independent	John Zammit	737		
Majority				
Labour hold		Swing		

=== Llanelly Division 3 ===
Llanelly Division 3 1949
Party	Candidate	Votes	%	±%
Labour	Mrs Claudia R. Rees*	631		
Independent	David J. Edmunds	313		
Majority				
Labour hold		Swing		

=== Llanelly Division 4 ===
Llanelly Division 4 1949
Party	Candidate	Votes	%	±%
Labour	Mrs Charlotte Hopkins*	1,115		
Independent	Sidney Ellis	955		
Majority				
Labour hold		Swing		

=== Llanelly Division 5 ===
Llanelly Division 5 1949
Party	Candidate	Votes	%	±%
Independent	Dame Gwendoline Trubshaw**	530		
Labour	Ben Howells	403		
Majority				
Independent hold		Swing		

=== Llanelly Division 6 ===
Llanelly Division 6 1949
Party	Candidate	Votes	%	±%
Labour	W. Douglas Hughes*	815		
Independent	William Hughes	182		
Majority				
Labour hold		Swing		

=== Llanelly Division 7 ===
Llanelly Division 7 1949
Party	Candidate	Votes	%	±%
Labour	J. Llewellyn Evans*	762		
Independent	Aneurin Thomas	462		
Majority				
Labour hold		Swing		

=== Llanelly Division 8 ===
Llanelly Division 8 1949
Party	Candidate	Votes	%	±%
Labour	George M. McConkey	868		
Independent	Fred Howells*	530		
Communist	Martin H. Thomas	17		
Majority				
Labour gain from Independent		Swing		

=== Llanelly Division 9 ===
Llanelly Division 9 1949
Party	Candidate	Votes	%	±%
Independent	A.H. Olive*	987		
Labour	John A. Palmer	803		
Communist	Brinley James	80		
Majority				
Independent hold		Swing		

=== Llanfihangel Aberbythick ===
Llanfihangel Aberbythick 1949
Party	Candidate	Votes	%	±%
Independent	T.J. Williams*	Unopposed		
Independent hold		Swing		

=== Llanfihangel-ar-Arth ===
Llanfihangel-ar-Arth 1949
Party	Candidate	Votes	%	±%
Independent	John Davies*	789		
Independent	William Harry	211		
Majority				
Independent hold		Swing		

=== Llangadog ===
Llangadog 1949
Party	Candidate	Votes	%	±%
Plaid Cymru	Gwynfor Richard Evans	Unopposed		
Plaid Cymru gain from Independent				

=== Llangeler ===
Llangeler 1949
Party	Candidate	Votes	%	±%
Labour	Daniel Griffiths	908		
Independent	John Evans	812		
Majority				
Labour hold		Swing		

=== Llangendeirne ===
Llangendeirne 1946
Party	Candidate	Votes	%	±%
Labour	Rev R.G. James*	1,012		
Independent	Rev James Jenkins**	666		
Majority				
Labour hold		Swing		

=== Llangennech ===
Llangennech 1949
Party	Candidate	Votes	%	±%
Labour	Thomas Bowen*	815		
Independent	John Rees	369		
Independent	Trefor Beasley	101		
Majority				
Labour hold		Swing		

=== Llangunnor ===
Llangunnor 1949
Party	Candidate	Votes	%	±%
Independent	William Parry Thomas*	Unopposed		
Independent hold		Swing		

=== Llanon ===
Llanon 1949
Party	Candidate	Votes	%	±%
Labour	Sidney Jones*	Unopposed		
Labour hold		Swing		

=== Llansawel ===
Llansawel 1949
Party	Candidate	Votes	%	±%
Independent	Daniel Williams	317		
Independent	John Morgan*	275		
Majority				
Independent hold		Swing		

=== Llanstephan ===
Llanstephan 1949
Party	Candidate	Votes	%	±%
Independent	T.Ll. Haries**	Unopposed		
Independent hold		Swing		

=== Llanybyther ===
Llanybyther 1949
Party	Candidate	Votes	%	±%
Independent	Benjamin Edward Davies*	Unopposed		
Independent hold		Swing		

=== Myddfai ===
Myddfai 1949
Party	Candidate	Votes	%	±%
Independent	Morgan Lewis Jones*	Unopposed		
Independent hold		Swing		

=== Pembrey ===
Pembrey 1949
Party	Candidate	Votes	%	±%
Labour	Simon John Elwyn Samuel*	Unopposed		
Labour hold		Swing		

=== Pontyberem ===
Pontyberem 1949
Party	Candidate	Votes	%	±%
Labour	David John Jones*	Unopposed		
Labour hold		Swing		

=== Quarter Bach ===
Quarter Bach 1949
Party	Candidate	Votes	%	±%
Labour	William Watkin Davies*	Unopposed		
Labour hold		Swing		

=== Rhydcymmerau ===
Rhydcymmerau 1949
Party	Candidate	Votes	%	±%
Independent	David Thomas*	Unopposed		
Independent hold		Swing		

=== St Clears ===
St Clears 1949
Party	Candidate	Votes	%	±%
Independent	Joseph David Rees**	Unopposed		
Independent hold		Swing		

=== St Ishmaels ===
St Ishmaels 1949
Party	Candidate	Votes	%	±%
Labour	Trevor Rhys Morris*	685		
Independent	William Anthony	600		
Majority				
Labour hold		Swing		

=== Trelech ===
Trelech 1949
Party	Candidate	Votes	%	±%
Independent	Simon Owen Thomas*	Unopposed		
Independent hold		Swing		

=== Trimsaran ===
Trimsaran 1949
Party	Candidate	Votes	%	±%
Independent Labour	Brinley Jenkins*	Unopposed		
Independent Labour hold		Swing		

=== Westfa ===
Westfa 1949
Party	Candidate	Votes	%	±%
Labour	Emrys Aubrey*	Unopposed		
Labour hold		Swing		

=== Whitland ===
Whitland 1946
Party	Candidate	Votes	%	±%
Independent	William Hughes Mathias*	Unopposed		
Independent hold		Swing		

== Election of aldermen ==
In addition to the 57 councillors the council consisted of 19 county aldermen. Aldermen were elected by the council, and served a six-year term. Following the elections the following nine aldermen were elected.

- W. Douglas Hughes, Labour
- Emrys Aubrey, Labour
- T.S. Bowen, Labour
- T.W. Morgan, Labour
- D.J. Jones, Labour
- W.W. Davies, Labour
- J. Amos Jones, Labour
- W.T. Griffiths, Labour
- J. Llewellyn Evans, Labour
- Dame Gwendoline Trubshaw, Independent

Apart from Dame Gwendoline, whose seat in Llanelli would be targeted by Labour at the by-election, the elevation of Labour councillors potentially strengthened the party's overall majority on the council. Two Independent aldermen who had been returned at the election, namely J.D. Rees (St Clears) and T.Ll. Harries (Llanstephan) were not re-elected.

== By-elections ==
Following the selection of aldermen the following by-elections were held. In Llanelli, the Independents gained two seats but Labour won the seat vacated by Dame Gwendoline Trubshaw.

=== Berwick by-election ===
Berwick by-election 1949
Party	Candidate	Votes	%	±%
Labour	William Isaac Daniel	921		
Independent Labour	Emrys Daniel Lewis	873		
Independent	Elvet Pugh	22		
Majority				
Labour hold		Swing		

=== Kidwelly by-election ===
Kidwelly by-election 1949
Party	Candidate	Votes	%	±%
Labour	J.H. Williams	999		
Independent	W.G. Gilbert	294		
Majority				
Labour hold		Swing		

=== Llanedy by-election ===
Llanedy by-election 1949
Party	Candidate	Votes	%	±%
Labour	Gwyn Howells	unopposed		
Labour hold		Swing		

=== Llanelly Division 2 by-election ===
Llanelly Division 2 by-election 1949
Party	Candidate	Votes	%	±%
Independent	John Zammit	984		
Labour	T.M. Price	795		
Majority				
Independent gain from Labour		Swing		

=== Llanelly Division 5 by-election ===
Llanelly Division 5 by-election 1949
Party	Candidate	Votes	%	±%
Labour	Ben Howells	454		
Independent	Harry Richards	307		
Majority				
Labour gain from Independent		Swing		

=== Llanelly Division 6 by-election ===
Llanelly Division 6 by-election 1949
Party	Candidate	Votes	%	±%
Labour	W.J. Davies	666		
Independent	Harry Beaton	310		
Majority				
Labour hold		Swing		

=== Llanelly Division 7 by-election ===
Llanelly Division 7 by-election 1949
Party	Candidate	Votes	%	±%
Independent	Mrs Eleanor Thomas	616		
Labour	Miss Elsie Jones	590		
Majority				
Independent gain from Labour		Swing		

=== Pontyberem by-election ===
Pontyberem by-election 1949
Party	Candidate	Votes	%	±%
Labour	John Williams	unopposed		
Labour hold		Swing		

=== Quarter Bach by-election ===
Quarter Bach by-election 1949
Party	Candidate	Votes	%	±%
Labour	Josiah Jones	1,422		
Independent	Owen A. Jenkins	920		
Majority				
Labour hold		Swing		

=== Westfa by-election ===
Westfa 1949
Party	Candidate	Votes	%	±%
Labour	W.J.F. Thomas	1,389		
Independent	Archibald Ivor Bailey	373		
Majority				
Labour hold		Swing		
