= 1934 Carmarthenshire County Council election =

Welsh local election

All 53 seats to Carmarthenshire County Council 27 seats needed for a majority
	First party	Second party	Third party
Party	Liberal	Conservative	Labour
Seats won	0/53	0/53	0/53
	Fourth party	Fifth party
Party	Independent	Liberal Unionist
Seats won	1/51	0/51
Council control after election
TBD

An election to the Carmarthenshire County Council was held in March 1934. It was preceded by the 1931 election and followed by the 1937 election.

== Overview of the result ==
The Independent group remained the majority grouping on the Council, with Labour polling strongly in the industrial south and east of the county. In the Llanelli area, Communist Party candidates contested a number of seats but polled a low vote in all cases.

== Boundary changes ==
There were no boundary changes.

== Candidates ==
Only a minority of the 53 divisions were contested. Labour fielded 30 candidates, more than ever before; eleven of whom were returned unopposed. A greater number of contests took place in 1934 in Carmarthenshire than at any time since the First World War. This was as a result of more contests in rural areas between rival Independent candidates.

== Outcome ==
There were very few changes as a result of the election. The most striking result was the defeat of the Council chairman, David Harry, in the Berwick ward. The Llanelly Star considered this 'a shabby return' after over twenty years' service. However, the result confirmed a pattern of increasing Labour dominance in the industrial part of the county, and Harry had previously been defeated in 1928 before regaining the seat in 1931.

In Llanelli town, the late withdrawal of W.T. Morris led to the unopposed return of Tom Charles for Labour. Charles had been narrowly defeated by Morris at several previous elections. In Ward Two, Percy Evans, returned at a by-election in 1931 following a split Independent vote, but now standing for the ILP, was defeated.

== Ward results ==
=== Abergwili ===
Abergwili 1934
Party	Candidate	Votes	%	±%
Independent	David Davies*	unopposed		
Independent hold		Swing		

=== Ammanford ===
Ammanford 1934
Party	Candidate	Votes	%	±%
Labour	Frank Davies*	unopposed		
Labour hold		Swing		

=== Bettws ===
Bettws 1934
Party	Candidate	Votes	%	±%
Independent	John Phillips*	unopposed		
Independent hold		Swing		

=== Caio ===
Caio 1934
Party	Candidate	Votes	%	±%
Independent	Isaac Williams*	unopposed		
Independent hold		Swing		

=== Carmarthen Eastern Ward (Lower Division) ===
Carmarthen Eastern Ward (Lower Division) 1934
Party	Candidate	Votes	%	±%
Independent	Katherine Isobel Harries*	529		
Labour	E.J. Richards	256		
Independent hold		Swing		

=== Carmarthen Eastern Ward (Upper Division) ===
Carmarthen Eastern Ward (Upper Division) 1934
Party	Candidate	Votes	%	±%
Independent	William Jones	504		
Labour	Mary Charles	422		
Independent	L.D. Thomas*	154		
Independent hold		Swing		

=== Carmarthen Western Ward (Lower Division) ===
Carmarthen Western Ward (Lower Division) 1934
Party	Candidate	Votes	%	±%
Independent	H.S. Holmes*	361		
Labour	W. Clarke	204		
Independent hold		Swing		

=== Carmarthen Western Ward (Upper Division) ===
Carmarthen Western Ward (Upper Division) 1934
Party	Candidate	Votes	%	±%
Independent	J. Ithel P. Thomas*	461		
Labour	Arthur Phillips	296		
Independent hold		Swing		

=== Cenarth ===
Cenarth 1934
Party	Candidate	Votes	%	±%
Independent	Ellenora James*	unopposed		
Independent hold		Swing		

=== Cilycwm ===
Cilycwm 1934
Party	Candidate	Votes	%	±%
Independent	David Lewis Jones	unopposed		
Independent hold		Swing		

=== Conwil ===
Conwil 1934
Party	Candidate	Votes	%	±%
Independent	J.J. Evans*	538		
Independent	T.L. Harries	300		
Independent hold		Swing		

=== Kidwelly ===
Kidwelly 1934
Party	Candidate	Votes	%	±%
Independent	Alfred Stephens*	662		
Labour	S. Evans	615		
Independent hold		Swing		

=== Laugharne ===
Laugharne 1931
Party	Candidate	Votes	%	±%
Independent	S.B. Williams*	unpopposed		
Independent hold		Swing		

=== Llanarthney ===
Llanarthney 1934
Party	Candidate	Votes	%	±%
Labour	W. Edgar Lewis*	1,433		
Independent	William Gealy	410		
Independent	William Hughes	252		
Labour hold		Swing		

=== Llanboidy ===
Llanboidy 1934
Party	Candidate	Votes	%	±%
Independent	Benjamin Salmon	unopposed		
Independent hold		Swing		

=== Llandebie North ===
Llandebie North 1934
Party	Candidate	Votes	%	±%
Labour	Gwilym R. Thomas*	685		
Independent	David O. Davies	571		
Majority				
Labour hold		Swing		

=== Llandebie South ===
Llandebie South 1934
Party	Candidate	Votes	%	±%
Labour	D.B. Lewis*	unopposed		
Labour hold		Swing		

=== Llandilo Rural ===
Llandilo Rural 1934
Party	Candidate	Votes	%	±%
Independent	Evan Davies*	654		
Independent	J.W. Nicholas	568		
Majority				
Independent hold		Swing		

=== Llandilo Urban ===
Llandilo Urban 1934
Party	Candidate	Votes	%	±%
Independent	Charles Rhys*	unopposed		
Independent hold		Swing		

=== Llandovery ===
Llandovery 1934
Party	Candidate	Votes	%	±%
Independent	Harry Vaughan Watkins*	605		
Independent	J. James	154		
Independent hold		Swing		

=== Llandyssilio ===
Llandyssilio 1934
Party	Candidate	Votes	%	±%
Independent	Henry Morris*	unopposed		
Independent hold		Swing		

=== Llanedy ===
Llanedy 1934
Party	Candidate	Votes	%	±%
Labour	T.J. Parry-Jones*	unopposed		
Labour hold		Swing		

=== Llanegwad ===
Llanegwad 1934
Party	Candidate	Votes	%	±%
Independent	Delme Davies-Evans*	unopposed		
Independent hold		Swing		

=== Llanelly Division 1 ===
Llanelly Division 1 1934
Party	Candidate	Votes	%	±%
Independent	Daniel Roberts*	993		
Independent	W.H. Williams	437		
Labour	J.R. Jones	350		
Independent hold		Swing		

=== Llanelly Division 2 ===
Llanelly Division 2 1934
Party	Candidate	Votes	%	±%
Independent	Brinley R. Jones*	519		
Labour	Richard Phillips	231		
Communist	Brinley Jones	100		
Independent hold		Swing		

=== Llanelly Division 3 ===
Llanelly Division 3 1934
Party	Candidate	Votes	%	±%
Independent	D. Haddon Jones	327		
Independent	James Jones	272		
Ind. Labour Party	Percy M. Evans*	236		
Labour	David John	68		
Majority				
Independent gain from Ind. Labour Party		Swing		

=== Llanelly Division 4 ===
Llanelly Division 4 1934
Party	Candidate	Votes	%	±%
Labour	Thomas Charles	Unopposed		
Majority				
Labour gain from Independent		Swing		

=== Llanelly Division 5 ===
Llanelly Division 5 1934
Party	Candidate	Votes	%	±%
Independent	Gwen Trubshaw*	546		
Labour	Margaret Griffiths	142		
Communist	E.F. Seaward	35		
Majority				
Independent hold		Swing		

=== Llanelly Division 6 ===
Llanelly Division 6 1934
Party	Candidate	Votes	%	±%
Labour	W. Douglas Hughes*	591		
Communist	Enoch Collins	126		
Majority				
Labour hold		Swing		

=== Llanelly Division 7 ===
Llanelly Division 7 1934
Party	Candidate	Votes	%	±%
Independent	W. Powell Rees*	628		
Communist	E. Leyshon	265		
Independent hold		Swing		

=== Llanelly Division 8 ===
Llanelly Division 8 1934
Party	Candidate	Votes	%	±%
Independent	A.H. Olive	781		
Labour	H.W. Bowen*	712		
Independent hold		Swing		

=== Llanelly Rural, Berwick ===
Llanelly Rural, Berwick 1934
Party	Candidate	Votes	%	±%
Labour	T.S. Bowen	1,022		
Independent	David Harry*	765		
Majority				
Labour gain from Independent		Swing		

=== Llanelly Rural, Hengoed ===
Llanelly Rural, Hengoed 1934
Party	Candidate	Votes	%	±%
Labour	Joseph Howells*	750		
Independent	D.J. Stone	625		
Majority				
Labour gain from Independent		Swing		

=== Llanelly Rural, Westfa and Glyn ===
Llanelly Rural, Westfa and Glyn 1934
Party	Candidate	Votes	%	±%
Labour	Emrys Aubrey*	unopposed		
Labour hold		Swing		

=== Llanfihangel Aberbythick ===
Llanfihangel Aberbythick 1934
Party	Candidate	Votes	%	±%
Independent	W.J. Evans*	504		
Labour	T.J. Willams	365		
Independent hold		Swing		

=== Llanfihangel-ar-Arth ===
Llanfihangel-ar-Arth 1934
Party	Candidate	Votes	%	±%
Independent	E. Haydn Davies*	unopposed		
Independent hold		Swing		

=== Llangadock ===
Llangadock 1934
Party	Candidate	Votes	%	±%
Independent	R.E. Williams*	578		
Independent	W.T. Morgan	431		
Independent hold		Swing		

=== Llangeler ===
Llangeler 1934
Party	Candidate	Votes	%	±%
Independent	R.G. Owen*	774		
Labour	Tom Jones	535		
Independent hold		Swing		

=== Llangendeirne ===
Llangendeirne 1934
Party	Candidate	Votes	%	±%
Independent	James Jenkins*	unopposed		
Independent hold		Swing		

=== Llangennech ===
Llangennech 1934
Party	Candidate	Votes	%	±%
Labour	D.J. Davies*	696		
Independent	David J. Jones	524		
Labour hold		Swing		

=== Llangunnor ===
Llangunnor 1934
Party	Candidate	Votes	%	±%
Independent	William Edwards*	638		
Independent	H. Spencer-Morris	205		
Independent hold		Swing		

=== Llanon ===
Llanon 1934
Party	Candidate	Votes	%	±%
Labour	Rees Morgan*	unopposed		
Labour hold		Swing		

=== Llansawel ===
Llansawel 1934
Party	Candidate	Votes	%	±%
Independent	Evan Harris*	unopposed		
Independent hold		Swing		

=== Llanstephan ===
Llanstephan 1934
Party	Candidate	Votes	%	±%
Independent	T.Ll. Haries*	513		
Independent	John James Bowen	286		
Independent hold		Swing		

=== Llanybyther ===
Llanybyther 1934
Party	Candidate	Votes	%	±%
Independent	W. James Williams	691		
Independent	Evan Morgan Evans*	423		
Majority				
Independent hold		Swing		

=== Myddfai ===
Myddfai 1934
Party	Candidate	Votes	%	±%
Independent	W.R. Clement*	unopposed		
Independent hold		Swing		

=== Pembrey North ===
Pembrey North 1934
Party	Candidate	Votes	%	±%
Labour	Gomer Evans*	unopposed		
Labour hold		Swing		

=== Pembrey South ===
Pembrey South 1934
Party	Candidate	Votes	%	±%
Labour	John Henry Williams*	unopposed		
Labour hold		Swing		

=== Quarter Bach ===
Quarter Bach 1934
Party	Candidate	Votes	%	±%
Labour	William Jones*	unopposed		
Labour hold		Swing		

=== Rhydcymmerai ===
Rhydcymmerai 1934
Party	Candidate	Votes	%	±%
Independent	Gwendoline Lloyd-Price*	unopposed		
Independent hold		Swing		

=== St Clears ===
St Clears 1934
Party	Candidate	Votes	%	±%
Independent	Joseph David Rees*	unopposed		
Independent hold		Swing		

=== St Ishmael ===
St Ishmael 1934
Party	Candidate	Votes	%	±%
Independent	E.H. Stephens	537		
Independent	William Bowen	391		
Independent hold		Swing		

=== Trelech ===
Trelech 1934
Party	Candidate	Votes	%	±%
Independent	Lewis L. Bowen*	unopposed		
Independent hold		Swing		

=== Whitland ===
Whitland 1934
Party	Candidate	Votes	%	±%
Independent	Thomas Lewis Phillips*	432		
Independent	W.H. Mathias	186		
Independent	W.S. Cole	184		
Independent	H. Williams	164		
Independent hold		Swing		

== Election of aldermen ==
In addition to the 53 councillors the council consisted of 17 county aldermen. Aldermen were elected by the council, and served a six-year term. There had been suggestions in the past that aldermen should face the electorate before being re-appointed but when this was suggested by Edgar Lewis (Lab, Llanarthey) at the statutory meeting the suggestion was greeted with laughter. The following nine aldermen were re-elected.

Western Area

- Sir F.D. Williams-Drummond, Hafodneddyn
- W.D. Davies, Parcygroes
- Edward James, Clynderwen
- John Lewis, Meirios Hall
- W. Price Williams, Carmarthen

Eastern Area

- William Greville, Cross Hnads
- Tom Morris, Garnant
- Thomas Thomas, Llangennech
- W.J. Williams, Brynamman
