= 1937 Carmarthenshire County Council election =

Welsh local election

All 57 seats to Carmarthenshire County Council 29 seats needed for a majority
	First party	Second party	Third party
Party	Liberal	Conservative	Labour
Seats won	0/57	0/57	0/57
	Fourth party	Fifth party
Party	Independent	Liberal Unionist
Seats won	0/57	0/57
Council control after election
TBD

An election to the Carmarthenshire County Council was held in March 1937. It was preceded by the 1934 election. Due to the Second World War no elections were held in 1940 and 1943 therefore the 1937 election was followed by the 1946 election.

== Overview of the result ==
As in all previous inter-war elections, the Independent group won a majority of the seats and this majority was bolstered by holding the majority of the aldermanic seats also. By 1937 the Labour Party held almost all the seats in the industrial eastern part of the county.

== Boundary changes ==
There were a number of boundary changes at this election. In Carmarthen town the boundaries were redrawn, reducing the number of wards from four to three. In Llanelli, in contrast, the number of wards were increased from eight to nine following a similar process. An additional ward was also created in Ammanford and new wards at Pontyberem and Trimsaran.

Other wards were renamed or had their boundaries slightly altered.

== Candidates ==
Around half the wards were uncontested, mainly in the rural areas. At Kidwelly, Sir Alfred Stephens, a member of the Council since 1898 (apart from a short interval between 1907 and 1910) decided to retire.

== Outcome ==
A similar number of contests took place compared with 1934. This included contests in rural areas between rival Independent candidates. Overall, Labour gained four seats, including three of the newly created wards.

In the Llanelli area, six Labour candidates were returned unopposed including for the new Llanelly Division 7 and Pontyberem wards. The owner of the Llanelly Star, Brinley Jones, was defeated by a Labour candidate, and Labour gained another seat in Burry Port. In Llanelly Ward 3, Haddon Jones was displaced by another Independent, Jim Jones, while in Ward 4, Martin Edwards, a member of Llanelly Borough Council won the seat previously held by the late Tom Charles. In Ward 8, W. Powell Rees, who had lost his borough council seat to Communist Brin James in 1935, now faced the same oppoenent in the county election. On this occasion, however, Rees won very comfortably. Much attention was also focused on Lady Howard Stepney's successful campaign in Pembrey ward.

== Ward results ==
=== Abergwili ===
Abergwili 1937
Party	Candidate	Votes	%	±%
Independent	David Davies*	unopposed		
Independent hold		Swing		

=== Ammanford No.1 ===
Boundary Change.

Ammanford No.1 1937
Party	Candidate	Votes	%	±%
Labour	John Harries	unopposed		
Labour win (new seat)				

=== Ammanford No.2 ===
Boundary Change.

Ammanford No.2 1937
Party	Candidate	Votes	%	±%
Labour	Frank Davies*	708		
Independent	David Jones	487		
Labour win (new seat)				

=== Berwick ===
Berwick 1937
Party	Candidate	Votes	%	±%
Labour	T.S. Bowen*	unopposed		
Labour hold		Swing		

=== Burry Port ===
Boundary Change.

Burry Port 1937
Party	Candidate	Votes	%	±%
Labour	W.D. Jenkins	993		
Independent	F.J. Morgan	672		
Labour win (new seat)				

=== Caio ===
Caio 1937
Party	Candidate	Votes	%	±%
Independent	Thomas Davies	438		
Independent	Isaac Williams*	297		
Independent hold		Swing		

=== Carmarthen Division 1 ===
Carmarthen Division 1 1937
Party	Candidate	Votes	%	±%
Independent	William Jones*	unopposed		
Independent win (new seat)				

=== Carmarthen Division 2 ===
Carmarthen Division 2 1937
Party	Candidate	Votes	%	±%
Independent	H.S. Holmes*	unopposed		
Independent win (new seat)				

=== Carmarthen Division 3 ===
Carmarthen Division 3 1937
Party	Candidate	Votes	%	±%
Independent	J. Ithel P. Thomas*	unopposed		
Independent win (new seat)				

=== Cenarth ===
Cenarth 1937
Party	Candidate	Votes	%	±%
Independent	Ellenora James*	unopposed		
Independent hold		Swing		

=== Cilycwm ===
Cilycwm 1937
Party	Candidate	Votes	%	±%
Independent	Ivor Elystan Campbell Davys*	unopposed		
Independent hold		Swing		

=== Conwil ===
Conwil 1937
Party	Candidate	Votes	%	±%
Independent	J.J. Evans*	523		
Independent	J.W.L. Harries	222		
Independent hold		Swing		

=== Cwmamman ===
Cwmamman 1937
Party	Candidate	Votes	%	±%
Independent	John Phillips*	1,068		
Independent	D.M. Richards	735		
Independent hold		Swing		

=== Hengoed ===
Hengoed 1937
Party	Candidate	Votes	%	±%
Labour	Joseph Howells*	unopposed		
Labour hold		Swing		

=== Kidwelly ===
Kidwelly 1937
Party	Candidate	Votes	%	±%
Labour	J. Amos Jones	708		
Independent	H.J. Owen	378		
Labour gain from Independent		Swing		

=== Laugharne ===
Laugharne 1937
Party	Candidate	Votes	%	±%
Independent	S.B. Williams*	612		
Labour	Owen Williams	197		
Independent hold		Swing		

=== Llanarthney ===
Llanarthney 1937
Party	Candidate	Votes	%	±%
Labour	W. Edgar Lewis*	unopposed		
Labour hold		Swing		

=== Llanboidy ===
Llanboidy 1937
Party	Candidate	Votes	%	±%
Independent	Benjamin Salmon*	unopposed		
Independent hold		Swing		

=== Llandebie North ===
Llandebie North 1937
Party	Candidate	Votes	%	±%
Independent	David O. Davies	702		
Labour	Gwilym R. Thomas*	666		
Majority				
Independent gain from Labour		Swing		

=== Llandebie South ===
Llandebie South 1937
Party	Candidate	Votes	%	±%
Labour	David Benjamin Lewis*	Unopposed		
Labour hold		Swing		

=== Llandilo Rural ===
Llandilo Rural 1937
Party	Candidate	Votes	%	±%
Independent	Evan Davies*	708		
Independent	J.W. Nicholas	660		
Majority				
Independent hold		Swing		

=== Llandilo Urban ===
Llandilo Urban 1937
Party	Candidate	Votes	%	±%
Independent	Benjamin Hughes*	unopposed		
Independent hold		Swing		

=== Llandovery ===
Llandovery 1937
Party	Candidate	Votes	%	±%
Independent	Harry Vaughan Watkins*	586		
Labour	James James	220		
Independent hold		Swing		

=== Llandyssilio ===
Llandyssilio 1937
Party	Candidate	Votes	%	±%
Independent	Henry Morris*	unopposed		
Independent hold		Swing		

=== Llanedy ===
Llanedy 1937
Party	Candidate	Votes	%	±%
Labour	Thomas William Morgan*	unopposed		
Labour hold		Swing		

=== Llanegwad ===
Llanegwad 1937
Party	Candidate	Votes	%	±%
Independent	Griffith Evans*	576		
Independent	Wynne Davies	265		
Independent hold		Swing		

=== Llanelly Division 1 ===
Boundary Change

Llanelly Division 1 1937
Party	Candidate	Votes	%	±%
Independent	Daniel Roberts*	1,141		
Ind. Labour Party	J.G. Davies	465		
Independent win (new seat)				

=== Llanelly Division 2 ===
Boundary Change

Llanelly Division 2 1937
Party	Candidate	Votes	%	±%
Labour	W.T. Griffiths	565		
Independent	Brinley R. Jones*	486		
Labour win (new seat)				

=== Llanelly Division 3 ===
Boundary Change

Llanelly Division 3 1934
Party	Candidate	Votes	%	±%
Independent	James Jones	400		
Labour	C.R. Rees	309		
Independent	D. Haddon Jones*	252		
Majority				
Independent win (new seat)				

=== Llanelly Division 4 ===
Boundary Change

Llanelly Division 4 1937
Party	Candidate	Votes	%	±%
Independent	Martin L. Edwards	598		
Labour	D.J. Charles	512		
Majority				
Independent win (new seat)				

=== Llanelly Division 5 ===
Boundary Change

Llanelly Division 5 1934
Party	Candidate	Votes	%	±%
Independent	Gwen Trubshaw*	666		
Communist	E.F. Seaward	25		
Majority				
Independent win (new seat)				

=== Llanelly Division 6 ===
Boundary Change

Llanelly Division 6 1937
Party	Candidate	Votes	%	±%
Labour	W. Douglas Hughes*	unopposed		
Labour win (new seat)				

=== Llanelly Division 7 ===
Boundary Change

Llanelly Division 7 1937
Party	Candidate	Votes	%	±%
Labour	J. Llewellyn Evans	unopposed		
Labour win (new seat)				

=== Llanelly Division 8 ===
Boundary Change

Llanelly Division 8 1937
Party	Candidate	Votes	%	±%
Independent	W. Powell Rees*	857		
Communist	Brin James	212		
Independent win (new seat)				

=== Llanelly Division 9 ===
Boundary Change

Llanelly Division 8 1934
Party	Candidate	Votes	%	±%
Independent	A.H. Olive*	1,077		
Labour	R.S. Beynon	191		
Independent win (new seat)				

=== Llanfihangel Aberbythick ===
Llanfihangel Aberbythick 1937
Party	Candidate	Votes	%	±%
Independent	W.J. Evans*	unopposed		
Independent hold		Swing		

=== Llanfihangel-ar-Arth ===
Llanfihangel-ar-Arth 1934
Party	Candidate	Votes	%	±%
Independent	E. Haydn Davies*	612		
Independent	E.J. Lewis	298		
Independent hold		Swing		

=== Llangadock ===
Llangadock 1937
Party	Candidate	Votes	%	±%
Independent	W.T. Morgan	536		
Independent	R.E. Williams*	493		
Independent hold		Swing		

=== Llangeler ===
Llangeler 1937
Party	Candidate	Votes	%	±%
Independent	R.G. Owen*	851		
Independent	Thomas Jones	431		
Independent hold		Swing		

=== Llangendeirne ===
Llangendeirne 1937
Party	Candidate	Votes	%	±%
Independent	James Jenkins*	unopposed		
Independent hold		Swing		

=== Llangennech ===
Llangennech 1937
Party	Candidate	Votes	%	±%
Labour	D.J. Davies*	unopposed		
Labour hold		Swing		

=== Llangunnor ===
Llangunnor 1937
Party	Candidate	Votes	%	±%
Independent	William Edwards*	528		
Independent	J.J. Bowen	384		
Independent hold		Swing		

=== Llanon ===
Llanon 1937
Party	Candidate	Votes	%	±%
Labour	Rees Morgan*	unopposed		
Labour hold		Swing		

=== Llansawel ===
Llansawel 1937
Party	Candidate	Votes	%	±%
Independent	John Morgan	unopposed		
Independent hold		Swing		

=== Llanstephan ===
Llanstephan 1937
Party	Candidate	Votes	%	±%
Independent	T.Ll. Haries*	unopposed		
Independent hold		Swing		

=== Llanybyther ===
Llanybyther 1937
Party	Candidate	Votes	%	±%
Independent	Benjamin Edward Davies	585		
Independent	W. James Williams*	529		
Majority				
Independent hold		Swing		

=== Myddfai ===
Myddfai 1937
Party	Candidate	Votes	%	±%
Independent	W.R. Clement*	unopposed		
Independent hold		Swing		

=== Pembrey ===
Boundary Change

Pembrey 1937
Party	Candidate	Votes	%	±%
Independent	Lady Howard Stepney	799		
Labour	J.J. Davies	586		
Independent win (new seat)				

=== Pontyberem ===
Boundary Change

Pontyberem 1937
Party	Candidate	Votes	%	±%
Labour	David John Jones	unopposed		
Labour win (new seat)				

=== Quarter Bach ===
Quarter Bach 1934
Party	Candidate	Votes	%	±%
Labour	William Watkin Davies	unopposed		
Labour hold		Swing		

=== Rhydcymmerai ===
Rhydcymmerai 1937
Party	Candidate	Votes	%	±%
Independent	David Thomas*	unopposed		
Independent hold		Swing		

=== St Clears ===
St Clears 1937
Party	Candidate	Votes	%	±%
Independent	Joseph David Rees*	unopposed		
Independent hold		Swing		

=== St Ishmael ===
St Ishmael 1937
Party	Candidate	Votes	%	±%
Independent	E.H. Stephens*	unopposed		
Independent hold		Swing		

=== Trelech ===
Trelech 1937
Party	Candidate	Votes	%	±%
Independent	Lewis L. Bowen*	525		
Independent	J.E. Jones	295		
Independent hold		Swing		

=== Trimsaran ===
Boundary Change

Trimsaran 1937
Party	Candidate	Votes	%	±%
Labour	Gomer Evans*	unopposed		
Labour win (new seat)				

=== Westfa and Glyn ===
Westfa and Glyn 1937
Party	Candidate	Votes	%	±%
Labour	Emrys Aubrey*	1,256		
Independent Labour	I.J. Haries	428		
Labour hold		Swing		

=== Whitland ===
Whitland 1937
Party	Candidate	Votes	%	±%
Independent	Thomas Lewis Phillips*	unopposed		
Independent hold		Swing		

== Election of aldermen ==
In addition to the 57 councillors the council included an aldermanic bench amounting to a third of the number of elected councillors. Following the creation of additional wards an extra aldermanic seat was created. Aldermen were elected by the council, and served a six-year term.

Following the elections the ten retiring aldermen were re-elected and Gwendoline Trubshaw, the new chairman of the Council, elected to the additional aldermanic seat created as a result of redistribution.

== By-elections 1937-46 ==
=== 1937 Llanelly Division 5 by-election ===
A by-election was held in May due to the elevation of Gwendoline Trubshaw, the current chair of Carmarthenshire County Council, to the aldermanic bench. The Labour candidate secured a narrow victory over a former long-serving member of the Llanelly Borough Council.

Llanelly Division 3 by-election
Party	Candidate	Votes	%	±%
Labour	Daniel Ll. Richards	286		
Independent	T. Hay Samuel	245		

=== 1938 Llanelly Division 8 by-election ===
A by-election was held in May due to the elevation of W. Powell Rees to the aldermanic bench following the death of Alderman Joseph Roberts. The Rev. Waldo Roberts, minister of Bethel Baptist Chapel was returned unopposed. He had previously served on Boards of Guardians at Neath and Holyhead.

Llanelly Division 8 by-election
Party	Candidate	Votes	%	±%
Independent	Rev F. Waldo Roberts	Unopposed		

=== 1939 Llanelly Division 8 by-election ===
Having served as a county councillor for less than a year, the Rev. Waldo Roberts died in April 1939. At the by-election, Fred Howells held the seat for the Independents.

Llanelly Division 8 by-election
Party	Candidate	Votes	%	±%
Independent	Fred Howells	446		
Labour	T.M. Price	215		
