= Portrait of Thomas Picton =

Painting by William Beechey

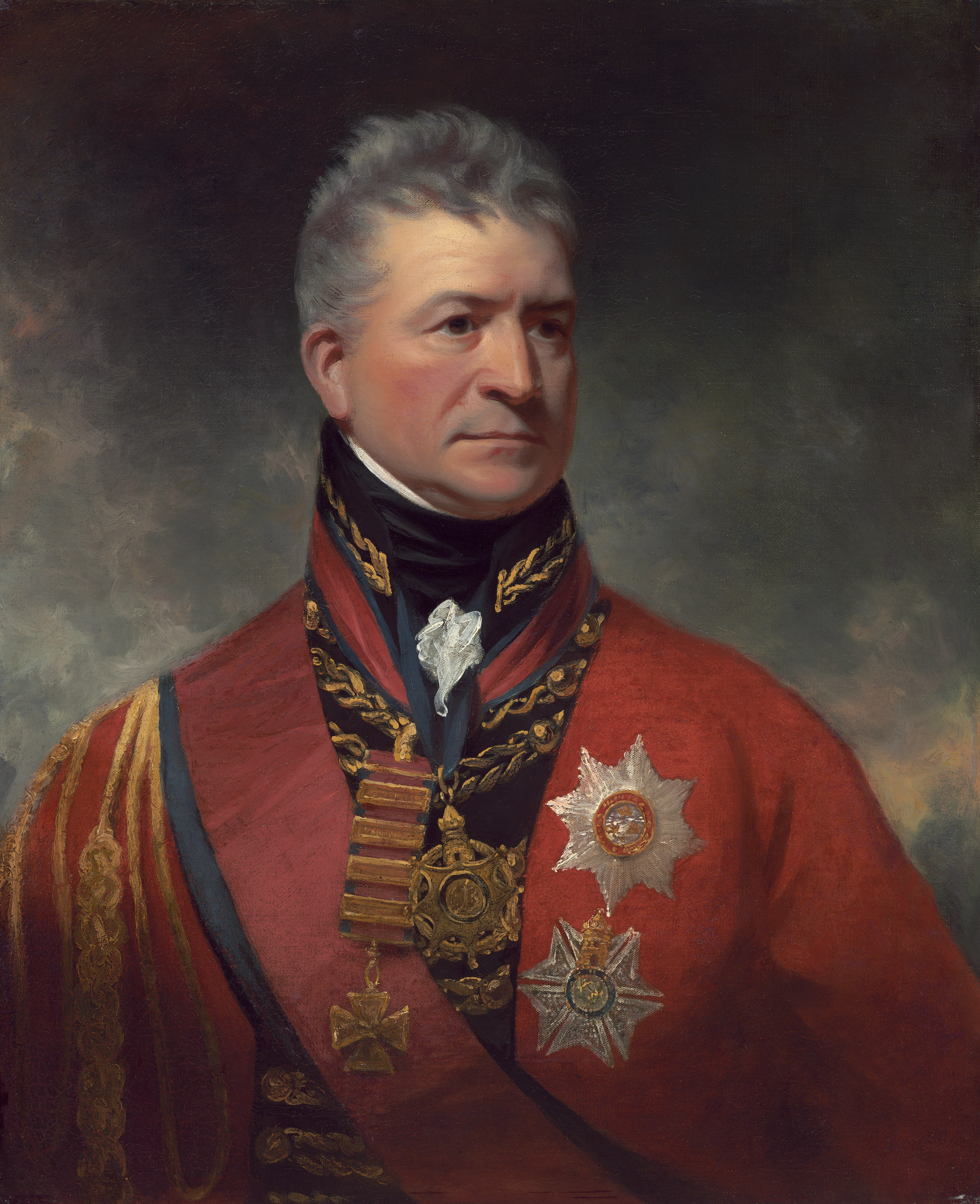
- Artist: William Beechey
- Year: c. 1815
- Type: Oil on canvas, portrait
- Dimensions: 77 cm × 63.7 cm (30 in × 25.1 in)
- Location: National Gallery of Art, Washington D.C.

Portrait of Thomas Picton is a c.1815 portrait painting by William Beechey of the Welsh general Thomas Picton. Picton served during the Peninsular War in Portugal and Spain. He was the highest-ranking British Army officer to die at the Battle of Waterloo, the final Allied victory over Napoleon that ended the Napoleonic Wars.

It was displayed at the Royal Academy Exhibition of 1815 at Somerset House. Several versions of the painting exist with one at Apsley House, the home of Picton's long-standing commander the Duke of Wellington. The copy in the National Gallery of Art in Washington D.C. was acquired in 1961. Picton had previously been painted by the Irish artist Martin Archer Shee in 1812, which is now in the collection of the National Portrait Gallery in London.

== See also ==
- Picton Monument, Carmarthen, a memorial to Picton in Wales

== Bibliography ==
- Hayes, John T. British Paintings in the National Gallery of Art. Cambridge University Press, 1992.
- Reynolds, Luke. Who Owned Waterloo?: Battle, Memory, and Myth in British History, 1815–1852. Oxford University Press, 2022.
