= 1919–1939 Carmarthen Borough Council elections =

Carmarthen Borough Council was a Welsh municipal body created by the 1835 Municipal Corporations Act which, at that time, replaced the ancient borough that had existed since medieval times. The Council consisted of 24 members, eighteen of whom were elected councillors and the remaining six were aldermen. Councillors were elected on a triennial cycle, with a third of councillors retiring each year. Aldermen were elected for a six-year term, normally from within the council membership although retiring aldermen were often re-elected without facing a contest.

Prior to the First World War, municipal elections had occasionally been fought on a party basis but there was also a strong tradition of electing independent candidates.

== 1919 Carmarthen Borough Council election ==
The first municipal election after the conclusion of the Great War saw a number of retiring members opposed by Trades and Labour Council candidates and also Ex-Servicemen. The two groups had formed an electoral pact to fight the election but that fell apart a month before the contest. Nevertheless, representatives of both groups were successful at the expense of retiring members.

=== Eastern Ward (three seats) ===
Eastern Ward 1919
Party	Candidate	Votes	%	±%
Independent	D. King Morgan*	1,147		
Ex-Servicemen	E.F. Bidgood	854		
Independent	Oliver Jones*	779		
Labour	I.H. Morgan	621		
Independent	J.N. Williams*	604		
Labour	S.J. Jones	495		

=== Western Ward (four seats) ===
Western Ward 1919
Party	Candidate	Votes	%	±%
Independent	H.S. Holmes*	700		
Labour	W.T. Jeffreys	633		
Labour	Richard Howells	599		
Independent	Thomas Davies*	588		
Ex-Serviceman	A.A. Baskerville	587		
Independent	E.J.V. Collier*	553		

== 1920 Carmarthen Borough Council election ==
The second municipal post-war contest was fought on party lines with supporters of the Lloyd George Coalition opposed by Labour candidates. In addition to the six councillors, three aldermen also retired, and this led to the defeat of the long-serving Walter Spurrell.

=== Eastern Ward (three seats) ===
Eastern Ward 1920
Party		Candidate	Votes	%	±%
C	Independent	Lewis D. Thomas**	1,077		
C	Independent	Alfred Fuller-Mills	969		
	Labour	W.J. Martin	915		
C	Independent	Walter Spurrell**	863		

=== Western Ward (three seats) ===
Western Ward 1920
Party		Candidate	Votes	%	±%
C	Independent	David Jones*	932		
C	Independent	Thomas Williams	910		
C	Independent	J.O. Morgan	851		
	Labour	S.J. Jones	312		

=== By-elections ===
Following the election of aldermen, by-elections were held. Walter Spurrell, rejected by the electors at the triennial election, was returned but retiring alderman W. Dunn Williams (who had not stood at the original election), was not returned.

=== Eastern Ward by-election (two seats) ===
Eastern Ward by-election 1920
Party	Candidate	Votes	%	±%
Independent	Walter Spurrell	894		
Labour	M.T. Evans	656		
Labour	David Thomas	646		
Independent	W. Dunn Williams**	615		

=== Western Ward by-election (one seat) ===
Western Ward by-election 1920
Party	Candidate	Votes	%	±%
Independent	Thomas Lloyd	1,042		
Labour	S.J. Jones	432		

== 1921 Carmarthen Borough Council election ==
As was the case the previous year, the local Liberal and Conservative associations supported a joint slate of candidates and this resulted in the defeat of all five Labour candidates.

=== Eastern Ward (three seats) ===
Eastern Ward 1921
Party		Candidate	Votes	%	±%
C	Independent	Thomas Lloyd*	1,200		
C	Independent	David John Davies*	1,025		
C	Independent	John Richards*	964		
	Labour	Benjamin Edward Charles	417		
	Labour	Henry David	375		

=== Western Ward (four seats) ===
Western Ward 1921
Party		Candidate	Votes	%	±%
C	Independent	David Williams*	1,242		
C	Independent	George Jones*	965		
C	Independent	Daniel Bartlett	863		
	Labour	David Thomas	715		
	Independent	John Jenkins*	663		
	Labour	Henry Samuel Gregory	357		

== 1922 Carmarthen Borough Council election ==
The election was fought against the backdrop of the General Election which was called after the Conservatives withdrew support from the Lloyd George Coalition Government. However, the local Liberal and Conservative associations continued to adhere to their own coalition arrangement and dominated the election, with the Labour candidates and an Independent elected as an Ex-Servicemen in 1919 all defeated. Two former councillors regained seats in the Western Ward.

=== Eastern Ward (three seats) ===
Eastern Ward 1922
Party		Candidate	Votes	%	±%
C	Independent	William Davies	1,089		
C	Independent	Walter Spurrell*	892		
C	Independent	Thomas Lewis	889		
	Independent	E.F. Bidgood*	738		
	Labour	David Thomas	627		
	Labour	M.T. Evans*	377		

=== Western Ward (four seats) ===
Western Ward 1922
Party		Candidate	Votes	%	±%
C	Independent	Thomas Davies	1,042		
C	Independent	John Jenkins	909		
	Ind. Conservative	H.S. Holmes*	788		
	Labour	W.T. Jeffreys*	615		
	Labour	Richard Howells*	494		

=== By-election ===
In September 1923, a by-election was held following the death of John Jenkins. John Phillips stood with the support of both Liberal and Conservative associations but the contest did not excite much interest, according to the local press.

=== Western Ward (one seat) ===
Western Ward by-election 1923
Party		Candidate	Votes	%	±%
C	Independent	John Phillips	818		
	Labour	S.J. Jones	633		
Majority			185		

== 1923 Carmarthen Borough Council election ==
For the first time since the war there was no contest in the Eastern Ward. The sole remaining Labour member, W.J. Martin, stood down after leaving Carmarthen for Bristol. Labour candidates contested the Western Ward but all three were defeated by the retiring members who once again represented the continuing 'coalition' between the Liberal and Conservative associations.

=== Eastern Ward (three seats) ===
Eastern Ward 1923
Party	Candidate	Votes	%	±%
Independent	William Evans**	Unopposed		
Independent	Andrew Fuller-Mills*	Unopposed		
Independent	Lewis David Thomas*	Unopposed		

=== Western Ward (three seats) ===
Western Ward 1923
Party		Candidate	Votes	%	±%
C	Independent	John O. Morgan*	1,210		
C	Independent	Thomas Williams*	1,015		
C	Independent	David Jones*	940		
	Labour	William T. Jeffreys	556		
	Labour	Benjamin E. Charles	548		
	Labour	Richard Howells	442		

=== By-elections ===
At the statutory meeting in November, Alfred Fuller-Mills, George Jones and Thomas Williams were elected aldermen, although there was no unanimity. At the ensuing by-elections, Labour failed to hold the seat vacated by W.J. Martin.

=== Eastern Ward by-election (one seat) ===
Eastern Ward by-election 1923
Party		Candidate	Votes	%	±%
C	Independent	J.B. Arthur	884		
	Independent	George James Lewis	791		
	Labour	David Thomas	628		
	Independent	W.A. Evans	472		

=== Western Ward by-election (one seat) ===
Western Ward by-election 1923
Party		Candidate	Votes	%	±%
C	Independent	John Crossman	976		
	Labour	S.J. Jones	581		

== 1924 Carmarthen Borough Council election ==
The election proved to be another clean sweep for Independent candidates, five of whom were fielded by the continuing local coalition between the local Conservative and Liberal associations.

=== Eastern Ward (three seats) ===
Eastern Ward 1924
Party		Candidate	Votes	%	±%
C	Independent	J. Arthur Jones*	1,197		
C	Independent	George James Lewis*	1,108		
	Independent	Daniel Bartlett*	1,103		
	Labour	David Owen	469		
	Labour	David Thomas	442		
	Labour	Ben Charles	310		

=== Western Ward (three seats) ===
Western Ward 1924
Party		Candidate	Votes	%	±%
C	Independent	Thomas Lloyd*	1,196		
C	Independent	David John Davies*	1,092		
C	Independent	William Jones	1,035		
	Labour	S.J. Jones	666		

== 1925 Carmarthen Borough Council election ==
Having lost all their seats over the previous two years, Labour managed to gain one seat in the Western Ward when Ben Charles was successful at the expense of John Phillips, who had narrowly won a by-election fourteen months previously.

=== Eastern Ward (three seats) ===
Eastern Ward 1925
Party		Candidate	Votes	%	±%
C	Independent	William Davies*	1,050		
C	Independent	Walter Spurrell*	991		
C	Independent	Thomas Lewis	955		
	Labour	Essex John Nicholas	557		
	Labour	William Thomas	462		

=== Western Ward (three seats) ===
Western Ward 1925
Party		Candidate	Votes	%	±%
C	Independent	H.S. Holmes*	848		
	Labour	Benjamin Charles	845		
C	Independent	Thomas Davies*	820		
C	Independent	John Phillips*	792		

== 1926 Carmarthen Borough Council election ==
It was reported that little excitement was caused by the municipal elections as Independent candidates (five of them supporting the continuing coalition between the local Conservative and Liberal associations) were elected. The position in the Eastern Ward was complicated by the retirement of three aldermen which meant that William Evans lost his seat.

=== Eastern Ward (three seats) ===
Eastern Ward 1926
Party		Candidate	Votes	%	±%
	Independent	David Williams*	1,050		
C	Independent	Lewis David Thomas*	960		
C	Independent	D. King Morgan**	920		
C	Independent	William Evans*	880		
	Labour	Essex John Nicholas	493		
	Labour	William Henry Evans	453		

=== Western Ward (three seats) ===
Western Ward 1926
Party		Candidate	Votes	%	±%
C	Independent	John O. Morgan*	1,105		
C	Independent	John Crossman*	943		
C	Independent	David Jones*	921		
	Labour	Samuel John Jones	657		
	Labour	J.W. Lewis	435		
	Labour	John Jenkins	424		
	Independent	D.J. Thomas	150		

=== By-elections ===
At the statutory meeting in November, D.J. Davies, H.S. Holmes and Walter Spurrell were elected aldermen. Spurrell, who had previously served an aldermanic term, tied with David Jones who then withdrew in his favour. Holmes had also served as a member of Carmarthenshire County Council since 1913. At the ensuing by-elections, three candidates nominated by the local coalition were successful, including J.B. Arthur who had stood down at the original election in favour of retiring aldermen.

=== Eastern Ward by-election (one seat) ===
Eastern Ward by-election 1926
Party		Candidate	Votes	%	±%
C	Independent	John Beynon Arthur*	1,032		
	Labour	Essex John Nicholas	507		

=== Western Ward by-election (two seats) ===
Western Ward by-election 1926
Party		Candidate	Votes	%	±%
C	Independent	Daniel Johns	943		
	Independent	Stanley Evans	877		
	Labour	Samuel John Jones	773		

== 1927 Carmarthen Borough Council election ==
While the election was described as the quietest on record, the election was notable for the success of Labour candidate S.J. Jones, elected to the council on his tenth attempt, having been unsuccessful at his nine previous attempts. The local coalition between the local Conservative and Liberal associations continued in the Western Ward but in the Eastern Ward three candidates ran as Independents.

=== Eastern Ward (three seats) ===
Eastern Ward 1927
Party	Candidate	Votes	%	±%
Independent	Daniel Bartlett*	1,046		
Independent	J. Arthur Jones*	933		
Independent	George James Lewis*	769		
Labour	E.J. Nicholas	511		

=== Western Ward (three seats) ===
Western Ward 1927
Party		Candidate	Votes	%	±%
C	Independent	Thomas Lloyd*	976		
C	Independent	William Jones*	891		
	Labour	S.J. Jones	779		
C	Independent	Stanley Evans*	772		
	Independent	D.J. Thomas	191		

== 1928 Carmarthen Borough Council election ==
The so-called coalition between the Conservative and Liberal associations continued under a different name with the six candidates running as Anti-Socialists. However, they achieved their poorest result for several years as the retiring Labour member was returned in the Eastern Ward alongside another Labour candidate and a British Legion candidate in the Western Ward.

=== Eastern Ward (three seats) ===
Eastern Ward 1928
Party		Candidate	Votes	%	±%
C	Independent	William Davies*	1,004		
	Labour	David Owen	909		
C	Independent	Thomas Lewis*	893		
C	Independent	J.B. Arthur*	837		
	British Legion	Charles W. Claxton	544		

=== Western Ward (three seats) ===
Western Ward 1928
Party		Candidate	Votes	%	±%
	Labour	Benjamin Charles*	802		
C	Independent	Daniel Johns*	694		
	British Legion	J.W. Davies	642		
C	Independent	Thomas Davies*	633		
C	Independent	Wiliam Evans	608		
	Independent	Henry Jones Davies	474		
	Independent	David John Thomas	145		

== 1929 Carmarthen Borough Council election ==
There was no change in the political complexion of the council as six non-Labour candidates were returned, four of whom were supported by the coalition between the local Conservative and Liberal associations.

=== Eastern Ward (three seats) ===
Eastern Ward 1929
Party		Candidate	Votes	%	±%
	Independent	David Williams*	1,330		
C	Independent	Lewis David Thomas*	1,122		
C	Independent	George James*	951		
	Labour	William Henry Evans	823		

=== Western Ward (three seats) ===
Western Ward 1929
Party		Candidate	Votes	%	±%
	Independent	Owen Jones*	1,077		
C	Independent	John O. Morgan*	952		
C	Independent	Thomas Williams*	836		
	Labour	Richard Howells	524		
	Independent Labour	David H. Jones	358		

=== By-elections ===
At the statutory meeting in November, L.D. Thomas (a member of Carmarthenshire County Council), J.O. Morgans and Thomas Lloyd were elected aldermen.

The by-elections saw a low turnout with Labour gaining one seat in the Eastern Ward.

=== Eastern Ward by-election (one seat) ===
Eastern Ward by-election 1929
Party	Candidate	Votes	%	±%
Labour	William Henry Evans	778		
Independent	Rev D.T. Glyndwr Richards	727		

=== Western Ward by-election (two seats) ===
Western Ward by-election 1929
Party	Candidate	Votes	%	±%
Independent	David Jones	850		
Independent	Henry Jones-Davies	760		
Labour	Richard Howells	413		
Labour	John Jenkins	340		

== 1930 Carmarthen Borough Council election ==
The election resulted in the return of six Independent members, two of whom were supported by the local Conservative and Liberal associations. S.J. Jones lost the seat he had gained three years previously.

=== Eastern Ward (three seats) ===
Eastern Ward 1930
Party	Candidate	Votes	%	±%
Independent	J. Islwyn Davies	1,216		
Independent	Daniel Bartlett*	1,074		
Independent	W.A. Evans	1,013		
Labour	E.J. Nicholas	653		
Independent	D.H. Jones	516		

=== Western Ward (three seats) ===
Western Ward 1930
Party		Candidate	Votes	%	±%
C	Independent	William Jones*	1.022		
	Independent	W.G. Griffiths	876		
C	Independent	H.J. Davies*	741		
	Labour	S.J. Jones*	732		
	Independent	D.J. Thomas	191		

== 1931 Carmarthen Borough Council election ==
The election was said not to have elicited much interest, as the narrow defeat of Labour member Benjamin Charles, who had headed the poll in the Western Ward three years previously, was balanced by S.J. Jones regaining the seat he lost the previous year.

=== Eastern Ward (three seats) ===
Eastern Ward 1931
Party	Candidate	Votes	%	±%
Independent	William Davies*	1,384		
Independent	Thomas Lewis*	1,192		
Labour	David Owen*	931		
Independent	D. Howell Jones	625		

=== Western Ward (three seats) ===
Western Ward 1931
Party	Candidate	Votes	%	±%
Independent	J. Russell Jones	1,010		
Labour	Samuel J. Jones	844		
Independent	P.W. Trefor Thomas	816		
Labour	Benjamin Charles*	815		

=== By-election ===
In October 1932, a by-election was scheduled in the Western Ward following the death of H. Jones-Davies. H.S. Holmes, whose aldermanic term was due to expire the following month, resigned from that role and was nominated for the by-election. The local Labour Association decided 'in the public interest' not to contest the vacancy and Holmes was returned unopposed.

=== Western Ward (one seat) ===
Western Ward by-election October 1932
Party	Candidate	Votes	%	±%
Independent	H.S. Holmes	Unopposed		

== 1932 Carmarthen Borough Council election ==
Only seven candidates contested the six seats with the three members in the Eastern Ward being returned unopposed.

=== Eastern Ward (three seats) ===
Eastern Ward 1932
Party	Candidate	Votes	%	±%
Labour	William Henry Evans*	Unopposed		
Independent	George James*	Unopposed		
Independent	David Williams*	Unopposed		

=== Western Ward (three seats) ===
Western Ward 1932
Party	Candidate	Votes	%	±%
Independent	Owen Jones*	1,087		
Independent	D.J. Davies**	1,079		
Independent	Thomas Williams*	786		
Labour	Benjamin Edward Charles*	781		

=== By-elections ===
At the statutory meeting in November, Daniel Bartlett, Thomas Lewis and William Davies were appointed aldermen. This resulted in three vacancies in the Eastern Ward. Walter Spurrell, who had indicated his intention to retire was elected at the head of the poll.

=== Eastern Ward by-election (three seats) ===
Eastern Ward by-election 1932
Party	Candidate	Votes	%	±%
Independent	Walter Spurrell*	1,169		
Labour	Benjamin Edward Charles	805		
Independent	D. John	794		
Independent	T. Thomas	692		
Independent	D.H. Jones	623		
Labour	D. Dyer	612		
Labour	J.E. Nicholas	493		
Independent	T.W. Walker	403		

== 1933 Carmarthen Borough Council election ==
It was stated that the result caused a surprise to many electorsm, but railwayman Herbert Morgan gained a seat in the Eastern Ward while Mary Charles JP polled strongly for Labour in the Western Ward.

=== Eastern Ward (three seats) ===
Eastern Ward 1933
Party	Candidate	Votes	%	±%
Independent	J. Islwyn Davies*	1,249		
Independent	William Arthur Evans*	973		
Labour	Herbert Morgan	956		
Independent	David Johns	805		
Independent	David Howell Jones	571		

=== Western Ward (three seats) ===
Western Ward 1933
Party		Candidate	Votes	%	±%
	Independent	William Jones*	1.086		
	Independent	H.S. Holmes*	1,033		
C	Independent	W.J. Lovell*	922		
	Labour	Mary Charles	876		

== 1934 Carmarthen Borough Council election ==
Having gained additional seats in recent years, Labour lost two seats, including that of Ben Charles, who had already lost and regained a seat twice in previous years. Former member Thomas Davies regained the seat he lost some years previously,

=== Eastern Ward (three seats) ===
Eastern Ward 1934
Party	Candidate	Votes	%	±%
Labour	David Owen*	1,265		
Independent	Thomas Davies	1,198		
Independent	E.D. Jones	1,087		
Labour	Benjamin Edward Charles*	920		
Labour	George V. Davies	362		

=== Western Ward (three seats) ===
Western Ward 1934
Party	Candidate	Votes	%	±%
Independent	J. Russell Jones*	1,067		
Independent	P.W. Trefor Thomas*	897		
Independent	Enoch Davies	869		
Labour	Samuel J. Jones*	784		
Independent	W.T. Walker	378		

== 1935 Carmarthen Borough Council election ==
Twelve candidates were nominated for the six vacant seats. The election resulted in no change in the political composition of the Council but two retiring members who had served for many years were defeated.

=== Eastern Ward (three seats) ===
Eastern Ward 1935
Party	Candidate	Votes	%	±%
Independent	William Henry Crossman*	989		
Labour	William Henry Evans*	968		
Independent	David Howell Jones	916		
Independent	Thomas Henry Twigg	892		
Independent	George James*	888		
Independent	Levi Evans	235		

=== Western Ward (three seats) ===
Western Ward 1935
Party	Candidate	Votes	%	±%
Independent	David John Davies*	1,322		
Independent	Thomas Lloyd**	1,070		
Independent	John Owen Morgans**	968		
Independent	Thomas Williams*	890		
Labour	William Clarke	542		
Labour	Benjamin Edward Charles	521		

=== By-elections ===
At the statutory meeting in November, William Jones, David Owen and William Henry Evans were appointed aldermen; the first occasion upon which two Labour members were elevated to the aldermanic bench. At the ensuing by-elections, Labour gained a seat.

=== Eastern Ward by-election (two seats) ===
Eastern Ward by-election 1935
Party	Candidate	Votes	%	±%
Independent	Thomas Henry Twigg	934		
Labour	John Jenkins	775		
Independent	Samuel John Jones	607		

=== Western Ward by-election (one seat) ===
Western Ward by-election 1935
Party	Candidate	Votes	%	±%
Independent	Thomas Williams	1,034		
Labour	William Clarke	618		

== 1936 Carmarthen Borough Council election ==
Labour gained two seats at the election with their candidates heading the poll in both wards. Thomas Williams, Pontgarreg, lost his seat in the Western Ward for the second successive year.

=== Eastern Ward (three seats) ===
Eastern Ward 1936
Party	Candidate	Votes	%	±%
Labour	Herbert Morgan*	1,065		
Independent	William Arthur Evans*	868		
Labour	William Clarke	775		
Independent	C.W. Claxton	753		
Independent	B.J. Davies	719		

=== Western Ward (three seats) ===
Western Ward 1933
Party		Candidate	Votes	%	±%
	Labour	B.E. Charles	1.039		
	Independent	H.S. Holmes*	859		
C	Independent	W.J. Lovell*	825		
	Independent	Thomas Williams*	751		

== 1937 Carmarthen Borough Council election ==
The election was uneventful as the six retiring members were all returned after a contest, leaving the political composition of the council unchanged.

=== Eastern Ward (three seats) ===
Eastern Ward 1937
Party	Candidate	Votes	%	±%
Labour	John Jenkins*	1,152		
Independent	Thomas Davies*	1,141		
Independent	E.D. Jones*	884		
Independent	C.W. Claxton	587		

=== Western Ward (three seats) ===
Western Ward 1937
Party	Candidate	Votes	%	±%
Independent	Enoch Davies*	1,152		
Independent	J. Russell Jones*	953		
Independent	P.W. Trefor Thomas*	857		
Labour	J.R. Davies	742		
Independent	T. Dobson	432		

== 1938 Carmarthen Borough Council election ==
Eleven candidates, of whom five were railwaymen or ex-railwaymen, contested the six seats. Owing to aldermanic vacancies nine members stood down, twomof whom, W.H. Crossman and Ald. Thomas Lewis decided not to seek re-election. The election resulted in one Labour gain giving the party seven seats on the council as opposed to seventeen Independents. J.O. Morgans polled record number of votes, three more than the late D.J. Davies in 1935

=== Eastern Ward (three seats) ===
Eastern Ward 1938
Party	Candidate	Votes	%	±%
Independent	J. Islwyn Davies*	1,289		
Labour	William Davies**	1,213		
Independent	David Howell Jones*	1,176		
Independent	Thomas Henry Twigg*	725		
Labour	William Williams	520		
Independent	C.W. Claxton	393		
Independent	D.W. Davies	260		

=== Western Ward (three seats) ===
Western Ward 1938
Party	Candidate	Votes	%	±%
Independent	John Owen Morgans*	1,325		
Independent	Thomas Lloyd*	1,283		
Labour	J.R. Davies	1,004		
Independent	D. Mansel David	898		

=== By-elections ===
At the statutory meeting in November, W.A. Evans, J. Russell Jones and P.W. Trefor Thomas were elected aldermen. By-elections took place in December. D.W. Lloyd-Davies and Thomas Dobson were elected ro fill the two vacancies in the Western Ward.
