= Daniel Mainwaring (sculptor) =

Welsh sculptor (1776–1839)

- Born: 1776
- Died: March 29, 1839 (aged 62–63); 18 Spillman Street, Carmarthen
- Burial place: St Peter's Church, Carmarthen
- Occupations: sculptor, builder, marble and stone mason
- Notable work: Original version of Picton Monument, Carmarthen
- Spouse: Mary Rees (married 1803)

Daniel Mainwaring (1776 – 29 March 1839) was a sculptor, a builder and a marble and stone mason in Carmarthen, South Wales. He built the original Picton Monument in 1825–1826.

== Early life ==
He was born in 1776.

== Career ==
In September 1810, he advertised his business in the Carmarthen Journal. He made black and other marble chimney pieces, monuments and tombstones. He worked at St David’s College, Lampeter. In 1824, he was chosen to build John Nash’s St Paul's Church in Carmarthen, which was later aborted.

In 1829, while digging a cellar, his workmen discovered a copper vessel, believed to be from late antiquity or the early medieval period, embedded in the alluvium three feet beneath the foundations of the old town wall.

=== Picton Monument ===
In 1824, he was commissioned to build a monument to Sir Thomas Picton designed by John Nash, comprising a black marble column with a statue and reliefs made by Edward Hodges Baily. Mainwaring was paid £1,500. He laid the foundation stone on 16 August 1825, and the monument was completed two years later. The monument was opened to the public in August 1828. It bore an inscription in both English and Welsh naming Mainwaring as the person who erected the monument. However, it deteriorated within a few years due to sub-standard Roman cement used by Baily for the figurative work, and was demolished by Mainwaring’s foreman, David James, in 1846.

=== Other works ===
Grave engraved by D. Mainwaring at St Ceinwr's Church, Llangunnor

He made a black marble altar for St Peter's Church in 1829. He is believed to have done the masonry at Golden Grove Mansion. He also built a slip on the quayside on the north side of the River Towy in 1813.

He made the following tablets, memorials, and monuments:

Description	Location
A tablet commemorating the rededication of the church by Giraldus Cambrensis, erected by Thomas Burgess in 1818.	St Michael and All Angels Church, Kerry
A tablet commemorating John Laugharne.	
A memorial to Bridget Bevan (d 1799), dated 1837.	Saint Teilo's Church, Llanddowror
Memorials to Thomas Lewis (d 1829) and Ven Thomas Beynon (d 1833).	St Teilo's Church, Llandeilo
Memorials to Rev David Davies (d 1831) and John George Philipps (d 1816).	St David's Church, Abergwili
Memorials to Rev. C. W. Bowen (d 1835) and Catherine Thomas (d 1809).	St Mary's Church, Kidwelly
A memorial to Lady Sarah Champion de Crespigny (d 1825).	St Patrick's Church, Pencarreg
A monument commemorating Rev. Edward Picton (d 1835).	St Thomas' Church, Ferryside
A monument plaque of W. M. Williams of Trefach (d 1820).	Saint Mary's Church, Crymych
A monument to Griffith Griffith (d 1822).	St Llawddog's Church, Cilgerran
A monument to Rev. E. Williams (d 1820).	St Peter's Church, Lampeter
A monument with a lion commemorating John Picton.	

== Personal life ==
In March 1803, he married Mary Rees, a wealthy widow with three children, at St Peter's Church.

Between 1804 and 1826, he lived on King Street, possibly in the building later occupied by D. King Morgan. He also owned or leased a number of other properties, including a building on the quay previously owned by his wife's late husband. In June 1818, he bought Parade House.

He built a new home at 18 Spillman Street in 1826–1827, a property with stables, a garden, outhouses, and five cottages to the rear, where he lived until his death. He probably also built 19 Spillman Street, as a stone sill in the building is engraved with: 'This pine end is the property of Daniel Mainwaring'.

== Death ==
On 29 March 1839, Daniel Mainwaring died of "water on the lungs". He was buried in the graveyard at St Peter’s Church.

He left an estate worth over £2,000, with his nephew John inheriting his marble business. David James, the foreman at his yard, was also mentioned in his will; he continued working for the Mainwaring business until John went to America.

== Legacy ==
His probate will dated 17 June 1830 is in the National Library of Wales archives.
