= Picton Monument, Carmarthen =

Military memorial

Picton Monument
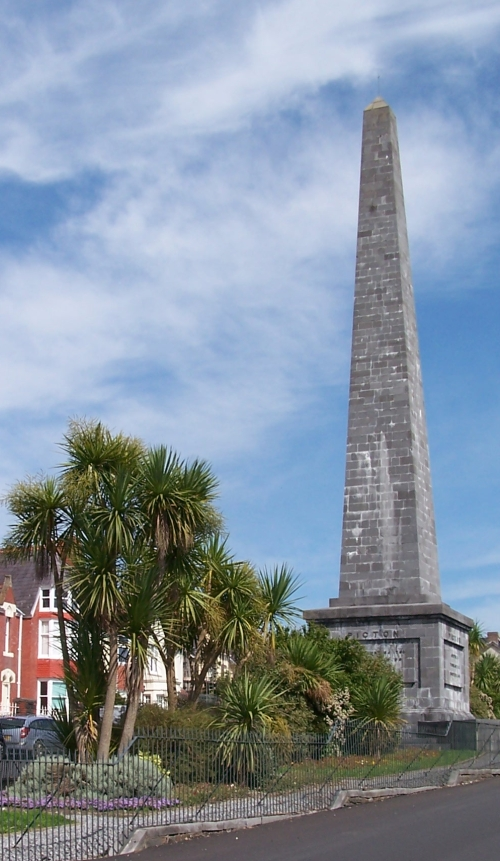

- Shown in Carmarthenshire
- 51°51′19″N 4°19′15″W
- Location: Carmarthen

History
- Built: 1847

Listed Building – Grade II
- Reference no.: 9503

The Picton Monument in Carmarthen, Wales, is one of a number of memorials commemorating Lieutenant General Sir Thomas Picton. He was the highest ranking British officer to die at the Battle of Waterloo in 1815. Picton was from Haverfordwest, Pembrokeshire. At the time of his death he had a property called Iscoed in Carmarthenshire.

The current limestone monument, which is Grade II listed, was erected in 1847, replacing an earlier structure in the town, designed by John Nash, which was weathering badly.

== Original monument ==
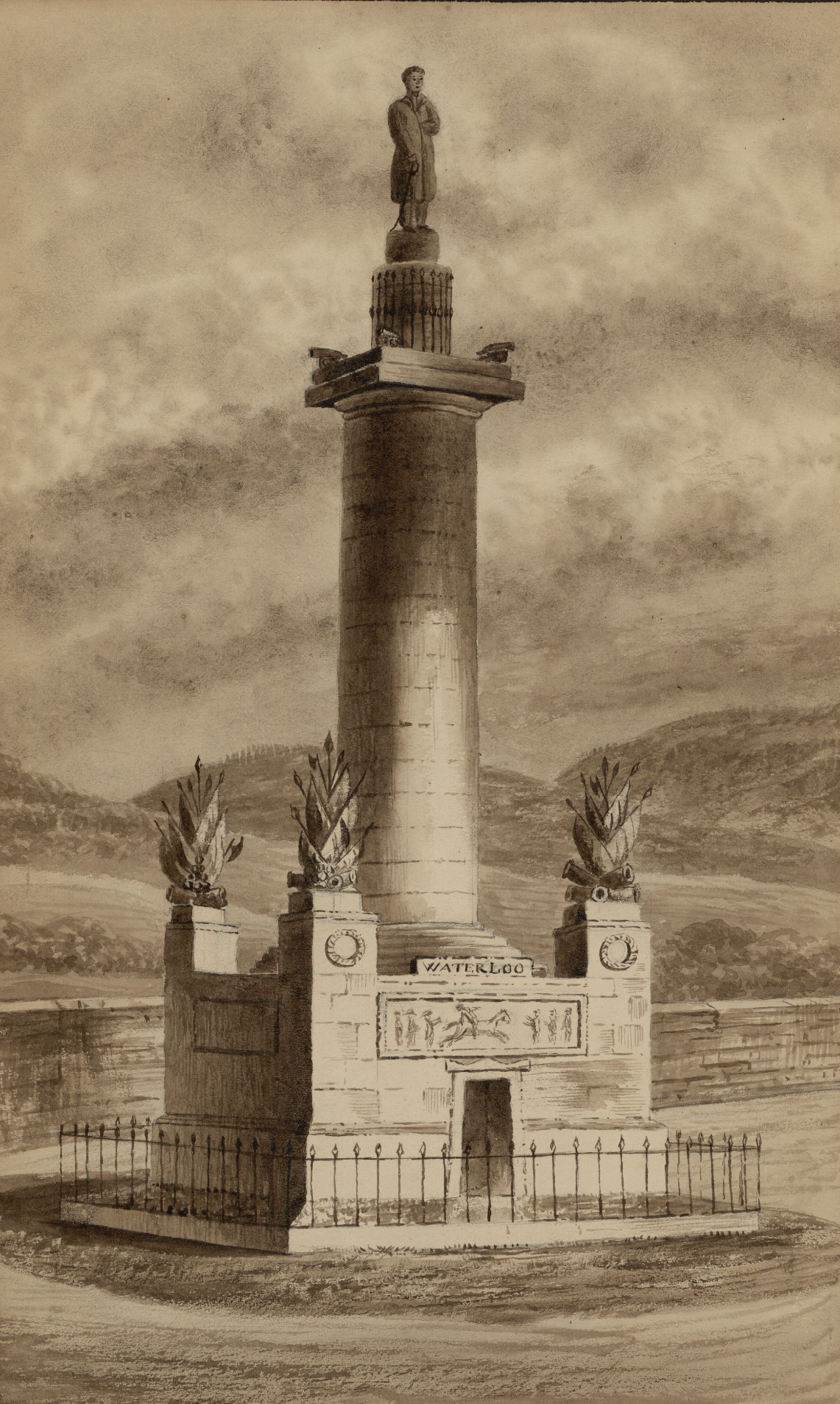
The original monument

In 1828, a monument was erected at the west end of Carmarthen. The pillar, which was about 75 ft (23 m), was designed by John Nash to echo Trajan's Column in Rome. A statue of Picton, wrapped in a cloak and supported by a baluster above emblems of spears surmounted the column. The structure stood on a square pedestal. Access was by a flight of steps to a small door on the east side, facing the town. A series of reliefs by Edward Hodges Baily adorned the structure.

The monument was erected by Daniel Mainwaring, who laid the foundation stone on 16 August 1825, and the monument was completed two years later. The monument was opened to the public in August 1828.

Above the entrance door was the name "PICTON", and over this a relief showing the Lieutenant General falling mortally wounded from his horse on the battlefield of Waterloo. "WATERLOO" was written across the top. The west side had a relief beneath the title 'BADAJOS' (Badajoz) showing Picton scaling the walls with his men during the Siege of Badajoz (1812). On the south side of the pedestal was a description of Picton's life in English. A Welsh version of his exploits was inscribed on the north side. Each side of the square pedestal was adorned with trophies. The top of the square column was adorned with imitative cannons on each side.

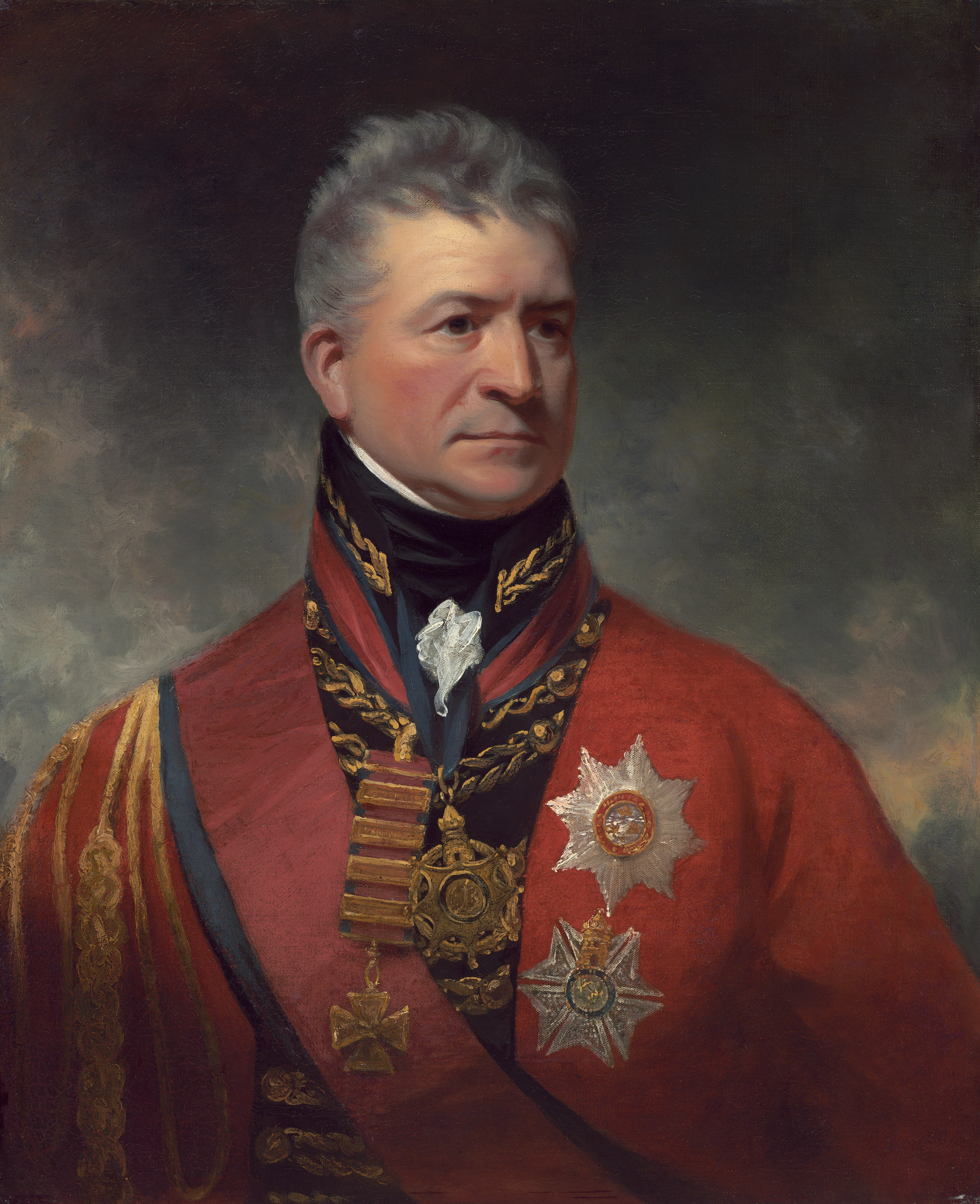
Portrait of Thomas Picton by William Beechey, 1815

Within a few years, the monument became dilapidated. The sculpted bas-reliefs proved "unable to withstand Carmarthen's inclement weather", according to local antiquarians. Although Baily made replacements, they were never put up. The entire pillar was taken down in 1846 by Mainwaring's foreman, David James. In the 1970s, the replacement sculptures were rediscovered in Johnstown and are now displayed in Carmarthenshire County Museum.

== Current monument ==
After demolition of the first monument, a new structure honouring Picton was commissioned from the architect F Fowler. The foundation stone was laid on Monument Hill in 1847. It is inscribed in raised capital letters: "Picton born August 24, 1758 Fell at Waterloo June 18, 1815" on two sides and the names of his battles on the other two sides: Busaco, Badajos, Vittoria, Orthes, Toulouse, and Waterloo.

The structure was listed in 1981 (Cadw reference 9503). In 1984, the top section was declared unsafe and taken down. Four years later, the whole monument was rebuilt stone-by-stone on stronger foundations.

=== Campaign for removal or renaming of the monument ===
While Picton was an important figure in the Napoleonic Wars, his reputation is tarnished by his record in the Caribbean which included the use of torture and mistreatment of enslaved people. Cadw refers to his culpability in crimes against humanity.

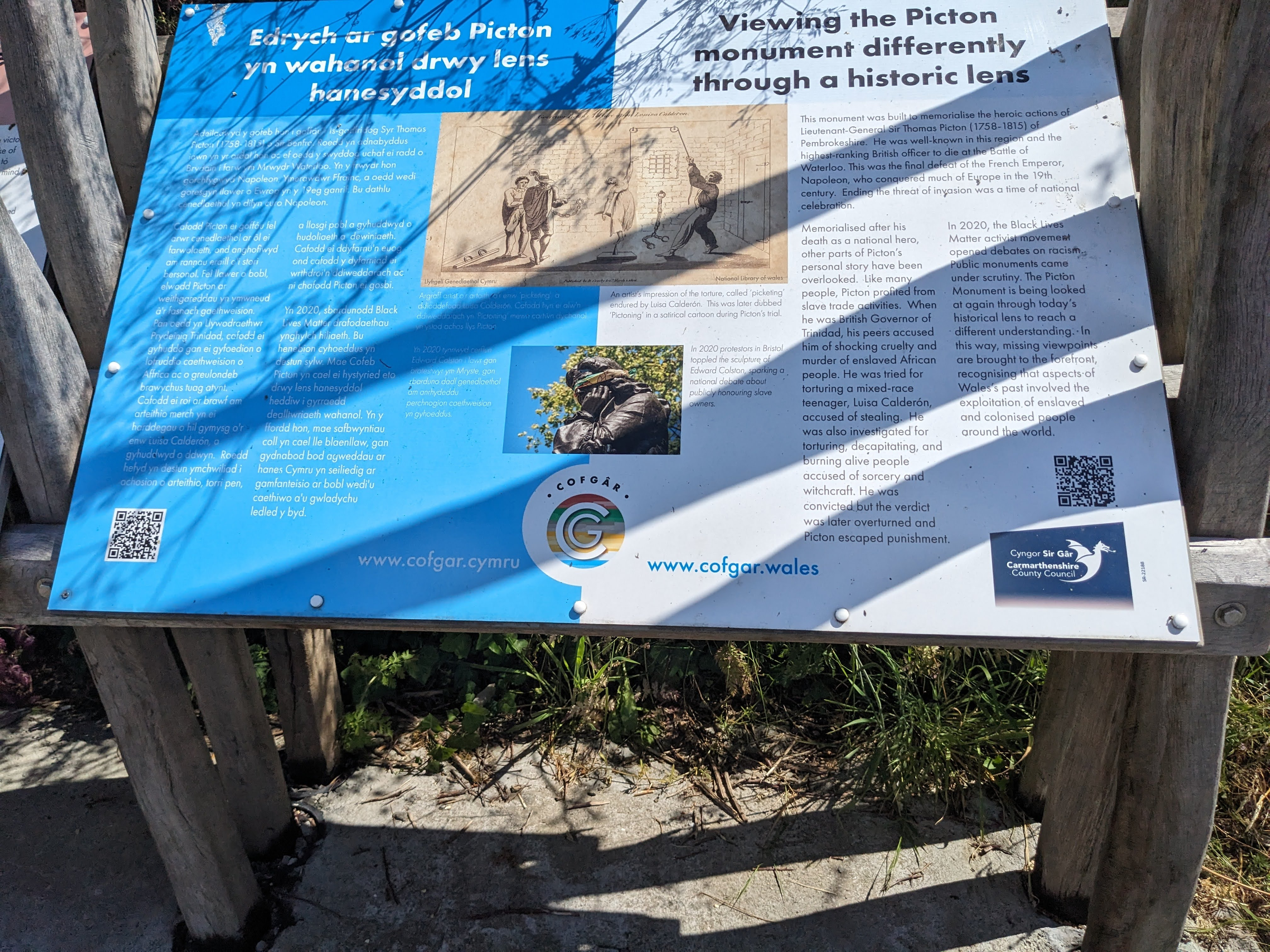
New information board near the Monument at Carmarthen

In the wake of the removal of the Statue of Edward Colston in Bristol on 6 June 2020, Wales Online reported that there were campaigns "to remove memorials to the Napoleonic war hero Thomas Picton". Although removal was on the agenda at Cardiff, where a statue of Picton and his portrait were taken off display, in the case of the Carmarthen obelisk, the report did not reveal any explicit attempt to remove it from the townscape, but instead gave details of an online petition which objected to the monument's commemoration of Picton. The petition gathered almost 20,000 signatures. A counter-petition was endorsed by Neil Hamilton, who at the time was leader of UKIP in Wales. Hamilton mentioned Picton's patriotism, military successes, courage and death in battle which, in his opinion, "deserve to be perpetuated in public monuments". A cross-party group was set up within Carmarthenshire County Council to review the Picton Monument. The group recommended that "prominently placed information boards" should be erected near to the monument. These should include "reference to Sir Thomas Picton encompassing his military career as well as his known links with slavery".
