= 1946 Carmarthenshire County Council election =

Welsh local election

All 57 seats to Carmarthenshire County Council 29 seats needed for a majority
	First party	Second party	Third party
Party	Liberal	Conservative	Labour
Seats won	0/57	0/57	0/57
	Fourth party	Fifth party
Party	Independent	Plaid Cymru
Seats won	0/57	0/57
Council control after election
TBD

An election to the Carmarthenshire County Council was held in March 1946. The 1940 and 1943 elections were postponed due to the Second World War, therefore the election was preceded by the 1937 election and followed, by the 1949 election.

== Overview of the result ==
The Independents retained their majority despite a strong Labour challenge, which saw an increase in the number of candidates contesting wards outside of the industrial south and east of the county. Retiring aldermen were also obliged to face the electorate before being re-elected to the bench.

== Boundary changes ==
There were no boundary changes.

== Candidates ==
There were 24 unopposed returns, including in Llandybie North and Pembrey, where the sitting Independent member retired and Labour was returned unopposed. In the former seat, Gwilym R. Thomas regained the seat that he had lost in 1937. In total, six Independent and eighteen Labour candidates were returned unopposed. A further Independent candidate was returned at Myddfai after the sitting councillor, W.R. Clement, withdrew.

A feature of the election was that the council, at its most recent quarterly meeting, discussed a proposal that aldermen should, in future, only be selected from amongst elected members. Such motions had been proposed in the past by Labour members but, on this occasion, a number of Independents agreed. retiring aldermen were obliged to seek re-election, and in many cases faced opposition from retiring councillors. This occurred in four wards, including at Cwmamman, where the chairman of the council, John Phillips (Ind) was opposed by retiring councillor David Davies (Lab). Two Independents who faced opposition from retiring aldermen, namely Capt. Ithel Thomas (Carmarthen) and Griffith Evans (Llanegwad) had spoken in favour of changing the system at the quarterly meeting.

Labour contested more seats than in previous elections, including all three seats in Carmarthen Borough. A solitary Plaid Cymru candidate, the party president, Gwynfor Evans, was nominated at Llangadog.

== Contested elections ==
Many wards were keenly contested following the reinstatement of electoral politics after nine years. The clsest contest was at Llangadog where Thomas Jones, chairman of Llandeilo Rural District Council, defeated Gwynfor Evans, the president of Plaid Cymru by one vote after three recounts.

In the Llanelli and Ammanford areas, Labour won ground, particularly in Llanelli town where three wards were gained from the Independents. In Ward Three, it was alleged that a Labour leaflet was distributed after dark the night before the election making personal allegationas against the defending Independent candidate, James Jones. Labour also defeated the sitting Independent at Llangeler (a rural ward where the party had been successful once before largely due to the local woollen industry). Labour also won the St Ishmaels ward for the first time.

Another feature was that long-serving aldermen faced the electorate. The only Labour loss was at Cwmamman where Ald. John Phillips, a member of the Council since 1922 narrowly defeated the sitting Labour councillor David Davies. In Carmarthen Town, Ald. William Price Williams was defeated by the retiring Independent, as were Ald. Evan Harris at Llansawel and Ald. W.D. Davies at Llanegwad.

== Ward results ==
=== Abergwili ===
Abergwili 1946
Party	Candidate	Votes	%	±%
Independent	G.P. Philipps	667		
Independent	D.J. Williams*	351		
Majority				
Independent hold		Swing		

=== Ammanford No.1 ===
Ammanford No.1 1946
Party	Candidate	Votes	%	±%
Labour	Frank Davies*	Unopposed		
Labour hold		Swing		

=== Ammanford No.2 ===
Ammanford No.2 1946
Party	Candidate	Votes	%	±%
Labour	John Harries*	Unopposed		
Labour hold		Swing		

=== Berwick ===
Berwick 1946
Party	Candidate	Votes	%	±%
Labour	T.S. Bowen*	1,150		
Independent Labour	Elvet Pugh	396		
Majority				
Labour hold		Swing		

=== Burry Port ===
Burry Port 1946
Party	Candidate	Votes	%	±%
Labour	W.D. Jenkins*	Unopposed		
Labour hold		Swing		

=== Caio ===
Caio 1946
Party	Candidate	Votes	%	±%
Independent	Thomas Davies*	486		
Independent	Isaac Williams	418		
Majority				
Independent hold		Swing		

=== Carmarthen Division 1 ===
Carmarthen Division 1 1946
Party	Candidate	Votes	%	±%
Independent	William Jones*	701		
Labour	J.E. Hughes	625		
Majority				
Independent hold		Swing		

=== Carmarthen Division 2 ===
Carmarthen Division 2 1946
Party	Candidate	Votes	%	±%
Independent	J.O. Morgans*	1,003		
Labour	G.G. Richards	461		
Majority				
Independent hold		Swing		

=== Carmarthen Division 3 ===
Carmarthen Division 3 1946
Party	Candidate	Votes	%	±%
Independent	J. Ithel P. Thomas*	516		
Labour	W.C. Ferman	482		
Independent	William Price Williams**	396		
Majority				
Independent hold		Swing		

=== Cenarth ===
Cenarth 1946
Party	Candidate	Votes	%	±%
Independent	D.J. James Jones	576		
Independent	Ellenora James*	313		
Independent	J. Clement Davies	278		
Majority		263		
Independent hold		Swing		

=== Cilycwm ===
Cilycwm 1946
Party	Candidate	Votes	%	±%
Independent	John Arthur Owen*	Unopposed		
Independent hold		Swing		

=== Conwil ===
Conwil 1946
Party	Candidate	Votes	%	±%
Independent	William Howell Phillips	523		
Independent	E.J. Evans	472		
Majority				
Independent hold		Swing		

=== Cwmamman ===
Cwmamman 1946
Party	Candidate	Votes	%	±%
Independent	John Phillips**	1,091		
Labour	David Davies*	1,030		
Majority				
Independent gain from Labour		Swing		

=== Hengoed ===
Hengoed 1946
Party	Candidate	Votes	%	±%
Labour	Joseph Howells**	Unopposed		
Labour hold		Swing		

=== Kidwelly ===
Kidwelly 1946
Party	Candidate	Votes	%	±%
Labour	John Amos Jones*	Unopposed		
Labour hold		Swing		

=== Laugharne ===
Laugharne 1946
Party	Candidate	Votes	%	±%
Independent	S.B. Williams*	542		
Independent	W.G. John	404		
Labour	H.G. Taylor	203		
Majority				
Independent hold		Swing		

=== Llanarthney ===
Llanarthney 1946
Party	Candidate	Votes	%	±%
Labour	W. Edgar Lewis*	Unopposed		
Labour hold		Swing		

=== Llanboidy ===
Llanboidy 1946
Party	Candidate	Votes	%	±%
Independent	John Williams*	Unopposed		
Independent hold		Swing		

=== Llandebie North ===
Llandebie North 1946
Party	Candidate	Votes	%	±%
Labour	Gwilym R. Thomas	Unopposed		
Majority				
Labour gain from Independent		Swing		

=== Llandebie South ===
Llandebie South 1946
Party	Candidate	Votes	%	±%
Labour	David Benjamin Lewis**	Unopposed		
Labour hold		Swing		

=== Llandilo Rural ===
Llandilo Rural 1946
Party	Candidate	Votes	%	±%
Independent	Evan Davies*	Unopposed		
Independent hold		Swing		

=== Llandilo Urban ===
Llandilo Urban 1946
Party	Candidate	Votes	%	±%
Independent	J.M. Davies*	Unopposed		
Independent hold		Swing		

=== Llandovery ===
Llandovery 1946
Party	Candidate	Votes	%	±%
Independent	Anthony H. Gower	485		
Labour	James James	307		
Majority				
Independent hold		Swing		

=== Llandyssilio ===
Llandyssilio 1946
Party	Candidate	Votes	%	±%
Independent	Edward James**	Unopposed		
Independent hold		Swing		

=== Llanedy ===
Llanedy 1946
Party	Candidate	Votes	%	±%
Labour	Thomas William Morgan*	Unopposed		
Labour hold		Swing		

=== Llanegwad ===
Llanegwad 1946
Party	Candidate	Votes	%	±%
Independent	Griffith Evans*	694		
Independent	W.D. Davies**	352		
Majority				
Independent hold		Swing		

=== Llanelly Division 1 ===
Llanelly Division 1 1946
Party	Candidate	Votes	%	±%
Labour	Rev D. Penry Jones	567		
Communist	Enoch Collins	245		
Majority				
Labour gain from Independent		Swing		

=== Llanelly Division 2 ===
Llanelly Division 2 1946
Party	Candidate	Votes	%	±%
Labour	W.T. Griffiths*	Unopposed		
Labour hold		Swing		

=== Llanelly Division 3 ===
Llanelly Division 3 1946
Party	Candidate	Votes	%	±%
Labour	C.R. Rees	600		
Independent	James Jones*	332		
Majority				
Labour gain from Independent		Swing		

=== Llanelly Division 4 ===
Llanelly Division 4 1946
Party	Candidate	Votes	%	±%
Labour	Charlotte Hopkins	997		
Independent	Martin L. Edwards*	612		
Majority				
Labour gain from Independent		Swing		

=== Llanelly Division 5 ===
Llanelly Division 5 1946
Party	Candidate	Votes	%	±%
Labour	W.T. Griffiths*	Unopposed		
Labour hold		Swing		

=== Llanelly Division 6 ===
Llanelly Division 6 1946
Party	Candidate	Votes	%	±%
Labour	W.J. Davies	Unopposed		
Labour hold		Swing		

=== Llanelly Division 7 ===
Llanelly Division 7 1946
Party	Candidate	Votes	%	±%
Labour	J. Llewellyn Evans*	Unopposed		
Labour hold		Swing		

=== Llanelly Division 8 ===
Llanelly Division 8 1946
Party	Candidate	Votes	%	±%
Independent	Fred Howells*	642		
Labour	A. Palmer	532		
Independent hold		Swing		

=== Llanelly Division 9 ===
Llanelly Division 9 1946
Party	Candidate	Votes	%	±%
Independent	A.H. Olive*	843		
Labour	J.M. Davies	764		
Majority				
Independent hold		Swing		

=== Llanfihangel Aberbythick ===
Llanfihangel Aberbythick 1946
Party	Candidate	Votes	%	±%
Independent	T.J. Williams	680		
Labour	Stephen Griffiths	393		
Majority				
Independent hold		Swing		

=== Llanfihangel-ar-Arth ===
Llanfihangel-ar-Arth 1946
Party	Candidate	Votes	%	±%
Independent	John Davies	658		
Independent	William Harry	256		
Independent	Thomas Richard Evans	72		
Majority				
Independent hold		Swing		

=== Llangadog ===
Llangadog 1946
Party	Candidate	Votes	%	±%
Independent	Thomas Jones	406		
Plaid Cymru	Gwynfor Evans	405		
Independent	W. Jones	299		
Majority		1		
Independent hold		Swing		

=== Llangeler ===
Llangeler 1946
Party	Candidate	Votes	%	±%
Labour	S.R. Thomas	808		
Independent	R.G. Owen*	792		
Majority				
Labour gain from Independent		Swing		

=== Llangendeirne ===
Llangendeirne 1946
Party	Candidate	Votes	%	±%
Labour	Rev R.G. James (Lab)	Unopposed		
Independent hold		Swing		

=== Llangennech ===
Llangennech 1946
Party	Candidate	Votes	%	±%
Labour	Thomas Bowen	731		
Independent	Luther Rolfe	361		
Independent Labour	S. Morlais J. Lloyd	278		
Majority				
Labour hold		Swing		

=== Llangunnor ===
Llangunnor 1946
Party	Candidate	Votes	%	±%
Independent	William Edwards*	513		
Independent	W.P. Thomas	482		
Independent	David Jenkins	186		
Majority				
Independent hold		Swing		

=== Llanon ===
Llanon 1946
Party	Candidate	Votes	%	±%
Labour	Sidney Jones	1,629		
Independent	Eva M. Harris	661		
Majority				
Labour hold		Swing		

=== Llansawel ===
Llansawel 1946
Party	Candidate	Votes	%	±%
Independent	John Morgan*	282		
Independent	Evan Harris**	279		
Majority		3		
Independent hold		Swing		

=== Llanstephan ===
Llanstephan 1946
Party	Candidate	Votes	%	±%
Independent	T.Ll. Haries*	Unopposed		
Independent hold		Swing		

=== Llanybyther ===
Llanybyther 1946
Party	Candidate	Votes	%	±%
Independent	Benjamin Edward Davies*	877		
Independent	Thomas Morgan	574		
Majority				
Independent hold		Swing		

=== Myddfai ===
Myddfai 1946
Party	Candidate	Votes	%	±%
Independent	Emlyn Lewis James	Unopposed		
Independent hold		Swing		

=== Pembrey ===
Pembrey 1946
Party	Candidate	Votes	%	±%
Labour	Simon J. Elwyn Samuel	Unopposed		
Labour gain from Independent		Swing		

=== Pontyberem ===
Pontyberem 1946
Party	Candidate	Votes	%	±%
Labour	David John Jones*	Unopposed		
Labour hold		Swing		

=== Quarter Bach ===
Quarter Bach 1946
Party	Candidate	Votes	%	±%
Labour	William Watkin Davies*	Unopposed		
Labour hold		Swing		

=== Rhydcymmerai ===
Rhydcymmerai 1946
Party	Candidate	Votes	%	±%
Independent	David Thomas*	320		
Independent	T.H. Lewis	217		
Majority				
Independent hold		Swing		

=== St Clears ===
St Clears 1946
Party	Candidate	Votes	%	±%
Independent	Joseph David Rees*	1,005		
Independent	Gwladys Olwen Buckley	333		
Majority				
Independent hold		Swing		

=== St Ishmaels ===
St Ishmaels 1946
Party	Candidate	Votes	%	±%
Labour	Trevor Rhys Morris	577		
Independent	David Jones	363		
Independent	John W. Jones Cremlyn	284		
Majority				
Labour gain from Independent		Swing		

=== Trelech ===
Trelech 1946
Party	Candidate	Votes	%	±%
Independent	S.O. Thomas*	741		
Independent	Stephen Davies	282		
Majority				
Independent hold		Swing		

=== Trimsaran ===
Trimsaran 1946
Party	Candidate	Votes	%	±%
Labour	Gomer Evans*	Unopposed		
Labour hold		Swing		

=== Westfa ===
Westfa 1946
Party	Candidate	Votes	%	±%
Labour	Emrys Aubrey*	1,601		
Independent	W.D. Ford	626		
Majority				
Labour hold		Swing		

=== Whitland ===
Whitland 1946
Party	Candidate	Votes	%	±%
Independent	William Hughes Mathias*	Unopposed		
Independent hold		Swing		

== Election of aldermen ==
In addition to the 57 councillors the council consisted of 19 county aldermen. Aldermen were elected by the council, and served a six-year term. For the first time, all retiring aldermen were obligd to seek re-election before being re-elected as aldermen, At the annual meeting on 16 March, five Independent and four Labour aldermen were elected. Considerable debate took place about the method of selection, with the traditional method of selecting on the basis of seniority abandoned. These included four former aldermen re-elected at the election, namely Joseph Howells (Lab, Hengoed), Edward James (Ind, Llandyssilio), D.B. Lewis (Lab, Tycroes) and John Phillips (Ind, Cwmamman).

The nine aldermen elected were:

- Evan Davies (Ind, Llandeilo)
- Frank Davies (Lab, Ammanford)
- William Edwards (Ind, Llangunnor)
- Gomer Evans (Lab, Trimsaran)
- Joseph Howells (Lab, Hengoed)
- D.B. Lewis (Lab, Tycroes)
- Edward James (Ind, Llandyssilio)
- John Phillips (Ind, Cwmamman)
- J. Ithel P. Thomas (Ind, Carmarthen)

== By-elections 1946-49 ==
Following the decision that retiring aldermen could no longer be re-appointed without facing the electorate, nine by-elections were called. In six of these there were unopposed returns, with three former councillors who had styood down in favour of retiring aldermen being returned. David Davies, who had unsuccessfully challenged retiring alderman John Phillips at Cwmamman, was also returned without opposition.

The three contested by-elections were all won by Independents. The successful candidate at Llangunnor, W. Parry Thomas, had recently been discharged by Carmarthen magistrates after being accused of offences during the triennial election.

=== Ammanford by-election ===
Llanedy by-election 1946
Party	Candidate	Votes	%	±%
Labour	Haydn Lewis	Unopposed		
Labour hold		Swing		

=== Carmarthen Division 3 by-election ===
Carmarthen Division 3 by-election 1946
Party	Candidate	Votes	%	±%
Independent	J. Verdi Jenkins	719		
Labour	Mary Davies	371		
Majority		348		
Independent hold		Swing		

=== Cwmamman by-election ===
Cwmamman by-election 1946
Party	Candidate	Votes	%	±%
Labour	David Davies*	Unopposed		
Labour gain from Independent		Swing		

=== Hengoed by-election ===
Hengoed by-election 1946
Party	Candidate	Votes	%	±%
Labour	D.J. Stone*	Unopposed		
Labour hold		Swing		

=== Llandeilo Rural by-election ===
Llandeilo Rural by-election 1946
Party	Candidate	Votes	%	±%
Independent	William John Thomas	919		
Independent	Llewellyn Williams Thomas	606		
Majority		313		
Independent hold		Swing		

=== Llandybie by-election ===
Llandybie by-election 1946
Party	Candidate	Votes	%	±%
Labour	Evan Bevan*	Unopposed		
Labour hold		Swing		

=== Llandysilio by-election ===
Llandysilio by-election 1946
Party	Candidate	Votes	%	±%
Independent	Hugh Davies*	Unopposed		
Independent hold		Swing		

=== Llangunnor by-election ===
Llangunnor by-election 1946
Party	Candidate	Votes	%	±%
Independent	W. Parry Thomas	766		
Independent	B.F. Herbert	392		
Majority		374		
Independent hold		Swing		

=== Trimsaran by-election ===
Trimsaran by-election 1946
Party	Candidate	Votes	%	±%
Labour	Brinley Jenkins	Unopposed		
Labour hold		Swing		
