= 1952 Carmarthenshire County Council election =

Welsh local election

An election to the Carmarthenshire County Council was held in April 1952. It was preceded by the 1949 election and followed, by the 1955 election.

== Overview of the result ==
After capturing control of the Council for the first time in 1949, Labour strengthened their hold by gaining an additional six seats in the Llanelli area. These included the two new wards created after boundary changes and the two wards in Llanelli town lost in by-elections in 1949. This counterbalanced the loss of Llangeler where Labour did not field a candidate. This was augmented by taking seven of the nine vacancies on the aldermanic bench.

== Boundary changes ==
Two additional seats were created, at Burry Port and Felinfoel.

== Retiring aldermen ==
The aldermen who retired at the election were ...

Retiring Labour councillors Haydn Lewis and Evan Bevan stood down in Ammanford and Llandybie respectively to allow Aldermen Frank Davies, and D.B. Lewis to be returned unopposed. Likewise, H.H. Harries and J.H. Davies stood down in Llandissilio and Llansteffan in favour of Edward James and T.Ll. Harries. Aldermen John Phillips (Cwmamman) and J.D. Rees (St Clears) withdrew at the last moment.

== Unopposed returns ==
34 members were returned unopposed, which included both rural and urban seats.

== Contested elections ==
25 seats were contested, including a number of instances where rival Independents fought each other. As in 1949, Independents sought to fight elections in Llanelli as a group, but had little success. Following the elections, Labour held all nine wards in Llanelli town for the first time.

A number of retiring aldermen stood as candidates and were returned unopposed. In Carmarthen, Alderman William Edwards, a member of the Council since 1928, stood in a town ward rather than in Llangunnor which he represented as a councilor until 1946. Edwards was defeated by the retiring Labour member.

== Results ==
This section summarises the detailed results which are noted in the following sections.

This table summarises the result of the elections in all wards. 53 councillors were elected.

Carmarthesnhire County Council 1952: elected members
Party	Seats	Gains	Losses	Net gain/loss	Seats %	Votes %	Votes	+/−
Labour								
Plaid Cymru								
Independent								

Carmarthenshire County Council 1952 : following election of new aldermen
Party	Seats	Gains	Losses	Net gain/loss	Seats %	Votes %	Votes	+/−
Labour								
Plaid Cymru								
Independent								

Carmarthenshire County Council 1952 : following election of new aldermen and by-elections
Party	Seats	Gains	Losses	Net gain/loss	Seats %	Votes %	Votes	+/−
Labour								
Plaid Cymru								
Independent								

== Ward results ==
=== Abergwili ===
Abergwili 1952
Party	Candidate	Votes	%	±%
Independent	William John Phillips	unopposed		
Independent hold		Swing		

=== Ammanford No.1 ===
Ammanford No.1 1952
Party	Candidate	Votes	%	±%
Labour	Frank Davies**	unopposed		
Labour hold		Swing		

=== Ammanford No.2 ===
Ammanford No.2 1952
Party	Candidate	Votes	%	±%
Labour	John Harries*	unopposed		
Labour hold		Swing		

=== Berwick ===
Berwick 1952
Party	Candidate	Votes	%	±%
Labour	William Isaac Daniel*	unopposed		
Labour hold		Swing		

=== Burry Port East ===
Boundary Change

Burry Port East 1952
Party	Candidate	Votes	%	±%
Labour	Labor Dennis	921		
Independent	Dr W.D. Williams	471		
Labour win (new seat)				

=== Burry Port West ===
Boundary Change

Burry Port West 1952
Party	Candidate	Votes	%	±%
Labour	Edward Lewis*	901		
Independent	Gwyn Thomas	273		
Labour win (new seat)				

=== Caio ===
Caio 1952
Party	Candidate	Votes	%	±%
Independent	Thomas Davies*	unopposed		
Independent hold		Swing		

=== Carmarthen Division 1 ===
Carmarthen Division 1 1952
Party	Candidate	Votes	%	±%
Labour	George V. Davies*	1,240		
Independent	William Edwards**	1,022		
Labour hold		Swing		

=== Carmarthen Division 2 ===
Carmarthen Division 2 1952
Party	Candidate	Votes	%	±%
Independent	J.O. Morgans*	unopposed		
Independent hold		Swing		

=== Carmarthen Division 3 ===
Carmarthen Division 3 1952
Party	Candidate	Votes	%	±%
Independent	J. Verdi Jenkins*	931		
Labour	Ellis J. Powell	708		
Independent hold		Swing		

=== Cenarth ===
Cenarth 1952
Party	Candidate	Votes	%	±%
Independent	D.E. James Jones*	unopposed		
Independent hold		Swing		

=== Cilycwm ===
Cilycwm 1952
Party	Candidate	Votes	%	±%
Independent	D.I. Lewis	448		
Independent	J.A. Owen*	290		
Independent hold		Swing		

=== Conwil ===
Conwil 1952
Party	Candidate	Votes	%	±%
Independent	William Howell Phillips*	Unopposed		
Independent hold		Swing		

=== Cwmamman ===
Cwmamman 1952
Party	Candidate	Votes	%	±%
Labour	David Davies*	unopposed		
Labour hold		Swing		

=== Felinfoel ===
Boundary Change

Felinfoel 1952
Party	Candidate	Votes	%	±%
Labour	Joseph Howells**	unopposed		
Labour win (new seat)				

=== Hengoed ===
Boundary Change

Hengoed 1952
Party	Candidate	Votes	%	±%
Labour	David John Stone*	864		
Independent	J.G. Thomas	358		
Labour win (new seat)				

=== Kidwelly ===
Kidwelly 1952
Party	Candidate	Votes	%	±%
Labour	J.H. Williams*	unopposed		
Labour hold		Swing		

=== Laugharne ===
Laugharne 1952
Party	Candidate	Votes	%	±%
Independent	W.G. John	797		
Independent	H.R. Lewis	582		
Independent hold		Swing		

=== Llanarthney ===
Llanarthney 1952
Party	Candidate	Votes	%	±%
Labour	W. Edgar Lewis*	unopposed		
Labour hold		Swing		

=== Llanboidy ===
Llanboidy 1952
Party	Candidate	Votes	%	±%
Independent	William Joshua Phillips*	unopposed		
Independent hold		Swing		

=== Llandebie North ===
Llandebie North 1952
Party	Candidate	Votes	%	±%
Labour	Gwilym R. Thomas*	unopposed		
Labour hold		Swing		

=== Llandebie South ===
Llandebie South 1952
Party	Candidate	Votes	%	±%
Labour	D.B. Lewis**	unopposed		
Labour hold		Swing		

=== Llandilo Rural ===
Llandilo Rural 1952
Party	Candidate	Votes	%	±%
Independent	David Marlais Humphreys	unopposed		
Independent hold		Swing		

=== Llandilo Urban ===
Llandilo Urban 1952
Party	Candidate	Votes	%	±%
Independent	James Morgan Davies*	unopposed		
Independent hold		Swing		

=== Llandovery ===
Llandovery 1952
Party	Candidate	Votes	%	±%
Independent	William Davies	565		
Independent	Anthony H. Gower*	425		
Independent	James James	157		
Independent hold		Swing		

=== Llandyssilio ===
Llandyssilio 1952
Party	Candidate	Votes	%	±%
Independent	Edward James**	unopposed		
Independent hold		Swing		

=== Llanedy ===
Llanedy 1952
Party	Candidate	Votes	%	±%
Labour	Gwyn Howells*	unopposed		
Labour hold		Swing		

=== Llanegwad ===
Llanegwad 1952
Party	Candidate	Votes	%	±%
Independent	Griffith Evans*	unopposed		
Independent hold		Swing		

=== Llanelly Division 1 ===
Llanelly Division 1 1952
Party	Candidate	Votes	%	±%
Labour	Rev David Penry Jones*	1,064		
Independent	W.G. Edmunds	1,041		
Labour hold		Swing		

=== Llanelly Division 2 ===
Llanelly Division 2 1952
Party	Candidate	Votes	%	±%
Labour	Dr H.D. Llewellyn	1,117		
Independent	John Zammit*	1,070		
Labour gain from Independent		Swing		

=== Llanelly Division 3 ===
Llanelly Division 3 1952
Party	Candidate	Votes	%	±%
Labour	Mrs Claudia R. Rees*	696		
Independent	Edith A. Francis	283		
Majority				
Labour hold		Swing		

=== Llanelly Division 4 ===
Llanelly Division 4 1952
Party	Candidate	Votes	%	±%
Labour	Mrs Charlotte Hopkins*	1,306		
Independent	Thomas B.J. Perks	685		
Majority				
Labour hold		Swing		

=== Llanelly Division 5 ===
Llanelly Division 5 1952
Party	Candidate	Votes	%	±%
Labour	Sidney Lewis	532		
Independent	Frederick Howells*	500		
Majority				
Labour gain from Independent		Swing		

=== Llanelly Division 6 ===
Llanelly Division 6 1952
Party	Candidate	Votes	%	±%
Labour	William J. Davies*	859		
Independent	William Hughes	93		
Labour hold		Swing		

=== Llanelly Division 7 ===
Llanelly Division 7 1952
Party	Candidate	Votes	%	±%
Labour	D.J. Williams	1,387		
Independent	Eleanor Thomas*	651		
Labour gain from Independent		Swing		

=== Llanelly Division 8 ===
Llanelly Division 8 1952
Party	Candidate	Votes	%	±%
Labour	George M. McConkey	unopposed		
Labour hold		Swing		

=== Llanelly Division 9 ===
Llanelly Division 9 1952
Party	Candidate	Votes	%	±%
Labour	S.I. Thomas	1,150		
Independent	A.H. Olive*	865		
Labour gain from Independent		Swing		

=== Llanfihangel Aberbythick ===
Llanfihangel Aberbythick 1952
Party	Candidate	Votes	%	±%
Independent	T.J. Williams*	766		
Labour	D.G. Williams	446		
Independent hold		Swing		

=== Llanfihangel-ar-Arth ===
Llanfihangel-ar-Arth 1952
Party	Candidate	Votes	%	±%
Independent	John Davies*	unopposed		
Independent hold		Swing		

=== Llangadog ===
Llangadog 1952
Party	Candidate	Votes	%	±%
Plaid Cymru	Gwynfor Richard Evans	618		
Independent	William Jones	486		
Plaid Cymru hold		Swing		

=== Llangeler ===
Llangeler 1952
Party	Candidate	Votes	%	±%
Independent	John Evans	unopposed		
Independent gain from Labour		Swing		

=== Llangendeirne ===
Llangendeirne 1952
Party	Candidate	Votes	%	±%
Labour	Rev R.G. James*	unopposed		
Labour hold		Swing		

=== Llangennech ===
Llangennech 1952
Party	Candidate	Votes	%	±%
Labour	Thomas Bowen*	959		
Plaid Cymru	Trefor Beasley	289		
Labour hold		Swing		

=== Llangunnor ===
Llangunnor 1952
Party	Candidate	Votes	%	±%
Independent	John Dobson Phelps	626		
Independent	William Parry Thomas*	557		
Independent hold		Swing		

=== Llanon ===
Llanon 1952
Party	Candidate	Votes	%	±%
Labour	Sidney Jones*	unopposed		
Labour hold		Swing		

=== Llansawel ===
Llansawel 1952
Party	Candidate	Votes	%	±%
Independent	Daniel Williams*	312		
Independent	John Morgan	295		
Independent hold		Swing		

=== Llanstephan ===
Llanstephan 1952
Party	Candidate	Votes	%	±%
Independent	T.Ll. Haries*	unopposed		
Independent hold		Swing		

=== Llanybyther ===
Llanybyther 1952
Party	Candidate	Votes	%	±%
Independent	Benjamin Edward Davies*	unopposed		
Independent hold		Swing		

=== Myddfai ===
Myddfai 1952
Party	Candidate	Votes	%	±%
Independent	Morgan Lewis Jones*	unopposed		
Independent hold		Swing		

=== Pembrey ===
Pembrey 1952
Party	Candidate	Votes	%	±%
Labour	Simon John Elwyn Samuel*	1,180		
Independent	Evelyn M. Thomas	503		
Labour hold		Swing		

=== Pontyberem ===
Pontyberem 1952
Party	Candidate	Votes	%	±%
Labour	John Williams*	unopposed		
Labour hold		Swing		

=== Quarter Bach ===
Quarter Bach 1952
Party	Candidate	Votes	%	±%
Labour	Josiah Jones*	1,674		
Independent	Owen A. Jenkins	658		
Labour hold		Swing		

=== Rhydcymmerai ===
Rhydcymmerai 1952
Party	Candidate	Votes	%	±%
Independent	David Thomas*	unopposed		
Independent hold		Swing		

=== St Clears ===
St Clears 1952
Party	Candidate	Votes	%	±%
Independent	T.E. Williams*	unopposed		
Independent hold		Swing		

=== St Ishmaels ===
St Ishmaels 1952
Party	Candidate	Votes	%	±%
Labour	Trevor Rhys Morris*	815		
Independent	M.T. Evans	418		
Independent	M. Jones	240		
Labour hold		Swing		

=== Trelech ===
Trelech 1952
Party	Candidate	Votes	%	±%
Independent	Simon Owen Thomas*	unopposed		
Independent hold		Swing		

=== Trimsaran ===
Trimsaran 1952
Party	Candidate	Votes	%	±%
Labour	Brinley Jenkins*	718		
Independent	William Harries	288		
Independent	C. Phillips	206		
Labour hold		Swing		

=== Westfa ===
Westfa 1952
Party	Candidate	Votes	%	±%
Labour	W.J.F. Thomas	unopposed		
Labour hold		Swing		

=== Whitland ===
Whitland 1952
Party	Candidate	Votes	%	±%
Independent	William Hughes Mathias*	unopposed		
Independent hold		Swing		

== Election of aldermen ==
In addition to the 59 councillors the council consisted of 19 county aldermen. Aldermen were elected by the council, and served a six-year term. Following the elections, seven of the nine aldermanic vacancies were taken by Labour. The leader of the Labour group, Douglas Hughes, justified this by stating that the Independents had behaved in a similar fashion over many years.

- Joseph Howells, Labour
- D.B. Lewis, Labour
- Frank Davies, Labour
- John Harries, Labour
- Edgar Lewis, Labour
- D.J. Stone, Labour
- Gwilym R. Thomas, Labour
- Edward James, Independent
- T.Ll. Harries, Independent

== By-elections ==
Following the selection of aldermen the following by-elections were held. Four members of the previous authority who had stood down in favour of retiring aldermen were now returned unopposed. The two contested elections included a strong showing by Plaid Cymru in Ammanford.

=== Ammanford No.1 by-election ===
Ammanford No.1 by-election 1952
Party	Candidate	Votes	%	±%
Labour	Haydn Lewis*	unopposed		
Labour hold		Swing		

=== Ammanford No.2 by-election ===
Ammanford No.2 by-election 1952
Party	Candidate	Votes	%	±%
Labour	Thomas Elias Evans	663		
Plaid Cymru	David Samuel Gwynfor Evans	558		
Labour hold		Swing		

=== Felinfoel by-election ===
Felinfoel by-election 1952
Party	Candidate	Votes	%	±%
Labour	Arthur Cledwyn Francis	unopposed		
Labour hold		Swing		

=== Hengoed by-election ===
Hengoed by-election 1952
Party	Candidate	Votes	%	±%
Labour	Edgar S. Samuel	497		
Independent Labour	Gwilym Thomas	344		
Labour hold		Swing		

=== Llanarthney by-election ===
Llanarthney by-election 1952
Party	Candidate	Votes	%	±%
Labour	D.M. Davies	unopposed		
Labour hold		Swing		

=== Llandybie North by-election ===
Llandybie North by-election 1952
Party	Candidate	Votes	%	±%
Labour	Evan Bevan*			
Labour hold		Swing		

=== Llandybie South by-election ===
Llandybie South by-election 1952
Party	Candidate	Votes	%	±%
Labour	William Morris			
Labour hold		Swing		

=== Llandyssilio by-election ===
Llandyssilio by-election 1952
Party	Candidate	Votes	%	±%
Independent	H.H. Harries	unopposed		
Independent hold		Swing		

=== Llanstephan by-election ===
Llanstephan by-election 1952
Party	Candidate	Votes	%	±%
Independent	J.H. Davies	unopposed		
Independent hold		Swing		
