= D. King Morgan Dispensing Chemists =

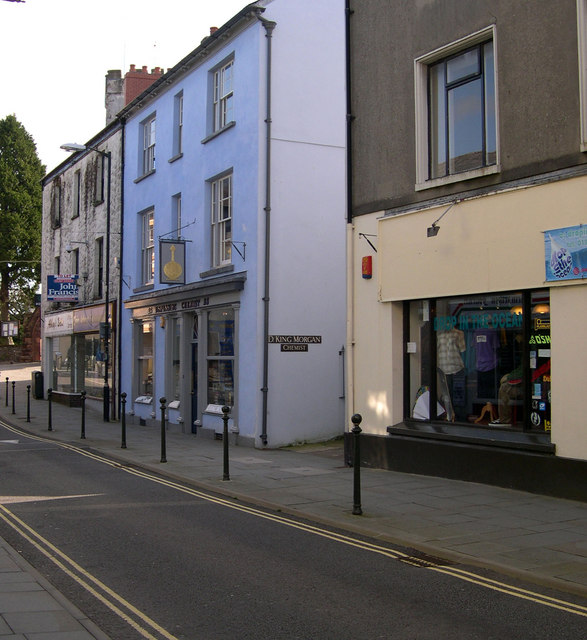
- D. King Morgan Chemist in 2009

General information
- Location: 25 King Street, Carmarthen, Wales
- Coordinates: 51.857446°N 4.303556°W

Listed Building – Grade II
- Official name: No 25, including No 3 Conduit Lane
- Designated: 19 May 1981
- Reference no.: 9463

D. King Morgan Dispensing Chemists, also known as D. King Morgan, was a chemist in a grade-II-listed building at 25 King Street, Carmarthen, Wales.

After an early history as an inn and house, the first pharmacy opened at the site in 1869. It became D. King Morgan around the early 20th century, and the business was continued through the 20th century by two of his sons. The business was bought by Nigel Williams, who renamed and relocated it in 2016.

The building may have been built over the mediaeval White Gate.

== History ==
The site of 25 King Street housed an inn called The Bacchus. The sculptor Daniel Mainwaring lived on King Street between 1804 and 1826, possibly in this house. It was previously owned by John Davies of Glancorrwg. The building may have suffered a fire in 1863 or 1864 and had to be rebuilt, reusing the original material.

James Brigstocke, Carmarthen's first qualified chemist, opened St Peter's Pharmacy at 25 King Street in 1869.

=== David King Morgan ===
David King Morgan acquired the pharmacy business at 25 King Street sometime in the late nineteenth century or early twentieth century, opening D. King Morgan Dispensing Chemists.

David King Morgan was a member of St. David's Air Gun Club and was described as having shot well in a match between local air gun clubs. In September 1910, he was elected unopposed as a member of Carmarthen Town Council for the Eastern Ward, succeeding his deceased father, George Morgan of Albert House, who was a woollen manufacturer from whom David inherited £250.

In 1915, a mariner called Daniel Jones died in the chemist shop of probable heart failure at age 68.

=== Gwyn and Jack King Morgan ===
For decades, the shop was run by his sons, David Gwyn (known as Gwyn or Gwynne) and Jack King Morgan. They both died in the 1990s.

In the 1950s, Gwyn Morgan established The Bizz, a businessman's club on Lammas Street in Carmarthen, which closed in 2017. He also founded a collection of sportsmen's and sportswomen's shoes, which is displayed at Carmarthen Athletic RFC, where he was the president of the club between 1961 and his death in 1999. The collection consists of 180 pairs of boots, including boots worn by Pelé, Jonah Lomu and Muhammad Ali, as well as Steffi Graf's tennis shoes. He donated three bronze bells to the people of Carmarthen, which were installed in the Guildhall in the late 80s and early 90s.

Jack King Morgan played the church organ.

=== 21st century ===
In 2016, the current owner, Nigel Williams, relocated the business to Furnace House Surgery, and renamed it Nigel Williams Pharmacy Ltd.

The building is currently occupied by a flower shop called Floral Decor, run by Sienna and Darryn Davies.

== Building ==
The building is a house with a chemist's shop on the ground floor. It may have been built on the site of the old mediaeval White Gate, which was demolished in 1792.

The floor to the cellar is described as uneven, possibly due to cobbles from an old Roman road. The cellar may contain traces of the White Gate. A section of the cellar is tunnel-shaped, but the ends are blocked with access only available through a side door. Local rumours suggest this may have been part of a tunnel from Carmarthen Castle to St Peter's Church.

The building was designated as grade II listed on 19 May 1981.

== Legacy ==
The Pont King Morgan footbridge, which opened in Carmarthen in 2006, is named in honour of the family.
