= Carmarthen by-election =

Carmarthen by-elections are the by-elections held on occasion for the British House of Commons constituency of Carmarthen in North Wales:

- 1878 Carmarthen Boroughs by-election
- 1882 Carmarthen Boroughs by-election
- 1924 Carmarthen by-election
- 1928 Carmarthen by-election
- 1941 Carmarthen by-election
- 1957 Carmarthen by-election
- 1966 Carmarthen by-election

== See also ==
- Carmarthen (UK Parliament constituency)
- List of United Kingdom by-elections
