= Wales constituency election results in the 1929 United Kingdom general election =

33rd Parliament	(1923)
34th Parliament	(1924)
35th Parliament	(1929)
36th Parliament	(1931)
37th Parliament	(1935)

Results of the election by constituency

This is a complete alphabetical list of election results from constituencies in Wales to the 35th Parliament of the United Kingdom at the 1929 general election, held on 30 May 1929.

== Wales ==
- Change in % vote and swing is calculated between the winner and second place and their respective performances at the 1924 election. A plus denotes a swing to the winner and a minus against the winner.

Aberavon
Party	Candidate	Votes	%	±%
Labour	William Cove	22,194	55.9	+2.8
Liberal	William Henry Williams	13,155	33.2	−13.7
Unionist	Francis Bertram Reece	4,330	10.9	n/a
Majority		9,039	22.7	+16.5
Turnout			87.0	−2.6
Labour hold		Swing	+8.2	

Aberdare
Party	Candidate	Votes	%	±%
Labour	George Hall	29,550	64.6	
Liberal	Evan Joshua Roderick	10,594	23.2	
Unionist	Hugh Molson	5,573	12.2	
Majority		18,956	41.4	
Turnout			84.5	
Labour hold		Swing		

Abertillery
Party	Candidate	Votes	%	±%
Labour	George Daggar	20,175	64.5	n/a
Liberal	Walter Reynolds Meredith	8,425	26.9	n/a
Unionist	Peter John Feilding Chapman-Walker	2,697	8.6	n/a
Majority		11,750	37.6	n/a
Turnout			82.4	n/a
Labour hold		Swing	n/a	

Anglesey
Party	Candidate	Votes	%	±%
Liberal	Megan Lloyd George	13,181	49.4	−14.5
Labour	William Edwards	7,563	28.4	−7.7
Unionist	Albert Hughes	5,917	22.2	n/a
Majority		5,618	21.0	−6.8
Turnout			79.8	
Liberal hold		Swing	-3.4	

Bedwellty
Party	Candidate	Votes	%	±%
Labour	Charles Edwards	26,021	78.95	N/A
Unionist	Hubert Geoffrey Griffith	6,936	21.05	N/A
Majority		19,085	57.9	N/A
Turnout		32,957	74.86	N/A
Labour hold		Swing	N/A	

Brecon and Radnor
Party	Candidate	Votes	%	±%
Labour	Peter Freeman	14,511	33.7	+3.2
Unionist	Walter Hall	14,324	33.3	−5.1
Liberal	Elias Wynne Cemlyn-Jones	14,182	33.0	+1.9
Majority		187	0.4	n/a
Turnout			87.7	+4.1
Labour gain from Unionist		Swing	+4.2	

Cardiff Central
Party	Candidate	Votes	%	±%
Labour	Ernest Bennett	14,469	39.1	+5.3
Unionist	Lewis Lougher	12,903	34.9	−14.8
Liberal	Barnett Janner	9,623	26.0	++9.5
Majority		1,566	4.2	20.1
Turnout			78.2	+1.4
Labour gain from Unionist		Swing	+10.0	

Cardiff East
Party	Candidate	Votes	%	±%
Labour	James Ewart Edmunds	12,813	39.0	+6.2
Liberal	John Emlyn-Jones	10,500	31.9	+5.0
Unionist	Clement Kinloch-Cooke	9,563	29.1	−11.1
Majority		2,313	7.1	14.6
Turnout			82.1	−0.2
Labour gain from Unionist		Swing	+0.6	

Caerphilly
Party	Candidate	Votes	%	±%
Labour	Morgan Jones	21,248	57.9	−1.1
Liberal	Alice Grace Roberts	8,190	22.4	n/a
Unionist	Owen Temple-Morris	6,357	17.4	−23.6
Communist	J R Wilson	829	2.3	
Majority		13,058	35.5	
Turnout			81.1	+1.8
Labour hold		Swing	n/a	

Cardiff South
Party	Candidate	Votes	%	±%
Labour	Arthur Henderson	13,686	45.3	+5.2
Unionist	Ernest Thomas Nethercoat	10,030	33.1	−17.0
Liberal	Charles James Cole	6,550	21.6	+11.8
Majority		3,656	12.2	22.2
Turnout			79.4	+0.6
Labour gain from Unionist		Swing	+11.1	

Cardiganshire
Party	Candidate	Votes	%	±%
Liberal	Rhys Hopkin Morris	17,127	60.6	n/a
Unionist	Edward Crawford Lloyd Fitzwilliams	11,158	39.4	n/a
Majority		5,969	21.1	n/a
Turnout		28,285	73.1	n/a
Liberal hold		Swing	n/a	

Carmarthen
Party	Candidate	Votes	%	±%
Labour	Daniel Hopkin	15,130	38.2	+6.7
Liberal	William Nathaniel Jones	14,477	36.6	−31.9
Unionist	John Coventry	9,961	25.2	n/a
Majority		653	1.6	−38.6
Turnout				
Labour gain from Liberal		Swing	+19.3	

Caernarvon Boroughs
Party	Candidate	Votes	%	±%
Liberal	David Lloyd George	16,647	58.0	−24.4
Unionist	John Bowen Davies	7,514	26.2	n/a
Labour	Thomas Ap Rhys	4,536	15.8	−1.7
Majority		9,133	31.8	−33.2
Turnout		28,697	81.8	+4.8
Liberal hold		Swing	n/a	

Caernarvonshire
Party	Candidate	Votes	%	±%
Liberal	Goronwy Owen	18,507	47.9	−2.9
Labour	Robert Jones	14,867	38.5	−10.7
Unionist	David Fowden Jones	4,669	12.1	n/a
Plaid Cymru	Lewis Valentine	609	1.6	n/a
Majority		3,640	9.4	+7.8
Turnout		38,652		
Liberal hold		Swing	+3.9	

Denbigh
Party	Candidate	Votes	%	±%
Liberal	Henry Morris-Jones	21,305	61.9	+8.9
Unionist	Alan Graham	13,116	38.1	−8.9
Majority		8,189	23.8	+17.8
Turnout			79.7	0.0
Liberal hold		Swing	+8.9	

Ebbw Vale
Party	Candidate	Votes	%	±%
Labour	Aneurin Bevan	20,088	60.3	n/a
Liberal	William Griffiths	8,924	26.8	n/a
Unionist	Mark Brace	4,287	12.9	n/a
Majority		11,164	33.5	n/a
Turnout		33,299	85.9	n/a
Labour hold		Swing	n/a	

Flintshire
Party	Candidate	Votes	%	±%
Liberal	Frederick Llewellyn-Jones	24,012	43.0	+8.5
Unionist	Ernest Roberts	19,536	35.0	−11.4
Labour	Cyril Oswald Jones	12,310	22.0	+2.9
Majority		4,476	8.0	19.9
Turnout			81.3	+1.1
Liberal gain from Unionist		Swing	+10.0	

Gower
Party	Candidate	Votes	%	±%
Labour	David Rhys Grenfell	20,664	54.0	
Liberal	Frederick William Davies	11,055	28.9	n/a
Unionist	Alan Lennox-Boyd	6,554	17.1	
Majority		9,609	25.1	
Turnout			79.6	
Labour hold		Swing		

Llandaff and Barry
Party	Candidate	Votes	%	±%
Labour	Charles Lloyd	21,468	40.8	
Unionist	William Cope	18,799	35.7	
Liberal	Ewan Davies	12,352	23.5	
Majority		2,669	5.1	
Turnout			82.5	
Labour gain from Unionist		Swing		

Llanelly
Party	Candidate	Votes	%	±%
Labour	John Henry Williams	28,595	55.4	+2.5
Liberal	Richard Thomas Evans	19,075	36.9	−10.2
Unionist	James Purdon Lewes Thomas	3,969	7.7	n/a
Majority		9,520	18.5	+12.7
Turnout			79.1	+3.4
Labour hold		Swing	+6.3	

Merioneth
Party	Candidate	Votes	%	±%
Liberal	Henry Haydn Jones	11,865	48.3	+0.5
Labour	John Jones Roberts	7,980	32.5	−0.6
Unionist	Charles Phibbs	4,731	19.3	+0.2
Majority		3,885	15.8	+1.1
Turnout		24,576	85.2	+1.3
Liberal hold		Swing	+0.6	

Merthyr
Party	Candidate	Votes	%	±%
Labour	R. C. Wallhead	22,701	59.6	−0.2
Liberal	James Jenkins	8,696	22.8	n/a
Unionist	Francis Bradley Bradley-Birt	6,712	17.6	−21.6
Majority		14,005	36.8	+17.2
Turnout			85.8	−1.1
Labour hold		Swing	n/a	

Monmouth
Party	Candidate	Votes	%	±%
Unionist	Leolin Forestier-Walker	16,353	49.3	
Liberal	Richard Charles Williams	8,582	25.8	n/a
Labour	Luke Henry Bateman	8,268	24.9	
Majority		7,771	23.5	−20.1
Turnout			78.9	
Unionist hold		Swing	n/a	

Montgomeryshire
Party	Candidate	Votes	%	±%
Liberal	Clement Davies	12,779	46.5	−30.8
Unionist	John Murray Naylor	10,651	38.7	n/a
Labour	John Evans	4,069	14.8	−7.9
Majority		2,128	7.8	−22.9
Turnout			88.3	+8.9
Liberal hold		Swing	-11.4	

Neath
Party	Candidate	Votes	%	±%
Labour	William Jenkins	29,455	60.2	n/a
Liberal	Jack Jones	14,554	29.8	n/a
Unionist	David J. Evans	4,892	10.0	n/a
Majority		14,901	30.4	n/a
Turnout			82.1	n/a
Labour hold		Swing	n/a	

Newport
Party	Candidate	Votes	%	±%
Labour	James Walker	18,653	39.5	−7.7
Unionist	Reginald Clarry	15,841	33.5	−19.3
Liberal	Samuel Immanuel Cohen	12,735	27.0	N/A
Majority		2,812	6.0	+0.4
Turnout			83.8	−1.9
Labour gain from Unionist		Swing	+5.8	

Ogmore
Party	Candidate	Votes	%	±%
Labour	Vernon Hartshorn	22,900	56.7	n/a
Liberal	Dapho Llewellyn Powell	11,804	29.2	n/a
Unionist	H. Abbott	4,164	10.3	n/a
Communist	J. R. Campbell	1,525	3.8	n/a
Majority		11,096	27.5	n/a
Turnout			82.8	n/a
Labour hold		Swing	n/a	

Pembrokeshire
Party	Candidate	Votes	%	±%
Liberal	Gwilym Lloyd George	19,050	41.8	+5.6
Unionist	Charles Price	14,235	31.3	−9.1
Labour	William James Jenkins	12,235	26.9	+3.5
Majority		4,815	10.6	14.8
Turnout		45,520		
Liberal gain from Unionist		Swing	+7.4	

Pontypool
Party	Candidate	Votes	%	±%
Labour	Thomas Griffiths	17,805	51.5	
Liberal	Geoffrey Crawshay	12,581	36.4	n/a
Unionist	Gwilym Rowlands	4,188	12.1	
Majority		5,224	15.1	
Turnout		34,574		
Labour hold		Swing		

Pontypridd
Party	Candidate	Votes	%	±%
Labour	Thomas Isaac Mardy Jones	20,835	53.12	−2.8
Liberal	John Victor Evans	14,421	36.8	n/a
Unionist	May Gordon Williams	3,967	10.1	−34.0
Majority		6,414	16.4	+4.5
Turnout		39,223	82.0	+2.3
Labour hold		Swing	n/a	

Rhondda East
Party	Candidate	Votes	%	±%
Labour	David Watts Morgan	19,010	50.2	n/a
Liberal	Richard David Chalke	10,269	27.0	n/a
Communist	Arthur Horner	5,789	15.2	n/a
Unionist	John Francis Powell	2,901	7.6	n/a
Majority		8,741	23.2	n/a
Turnout			84.7	n/a
Labour hold		Swing	n/a	

Rhondda West
Party	Candidate	Votes	%	±%
Labour	William John	23,238	65.1	n/a
Liberal	Moelwyn Hughes	9,247	25.9	n/a
Unionist	Wilfred Augustus Prichard	3,210	9.0	n/a
Majority		13,991	39.2	n/a
Turnout		35,695	86.7	n/a
Labour hold		Swing		

Swansea East
Party	Candidate	Votes	%	±%
Labour	David Williams	16,665	56.5	+1.9
Liberal	Arthur Hopkins	9,825	33.3	−12.1
Unionist	P.P. Jones	3,003	10.2	n/a
Majority		6,840	23.2	+14.0
Turnout			81.9	+1.2
Labour hold		Swing	+7.0	

Swansea West
Party	Candidate	Votes	%	±%
Labour	Howel Samuel	13,268	40.6	+7.2
Liberal	Charles Kerr	12,625	38.6	+2.2
Unionist	Alfred William Ernest Wynne	6,794	20.8	−9.4
Majority		643	2.0	5.0
Turnout			81.7	−5.3
Labour gain from Liberal		Swing	+2.5	

Wrexham
Party	Candidate	Votes	%	±%
Labour	Robert Richards	20,584	46.4	+2.0
Liberal	Christmas Price Williams	13,997	31.5	−24.1
Unionist	Edmund Fleming Bushby	9,820	22.1	n/a
Majority		6,587	14.9	26.1
Turnout			84.9	+2.3
Labour gain from Liberal		Swing	+13.0	
