= Ann Davies (politician) =

British politician

Ann Davies MP
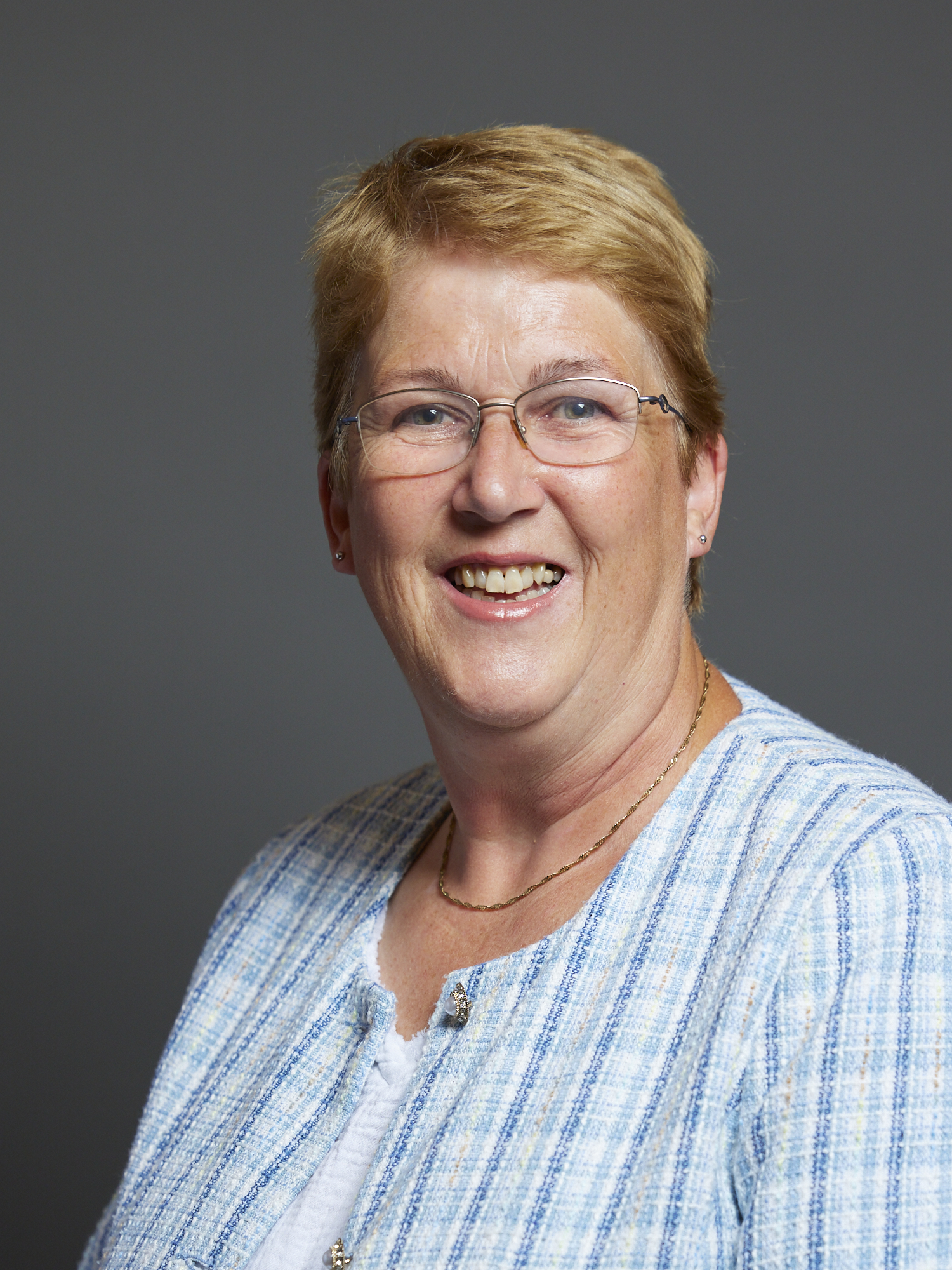
- Official portrait, 2024

Member of Parliament for Caerfyrddin
- Incumbent
- Assumed office 4 July 2024
- Preceded by: Constituency created
- Majority: 4,535 (9.9%)

Member of Carmarthenshire County Council for Llanddarog
- In office 8 May 2017 – 31 January 2025
- Preceded by: William John Wyn Evans
- Succeeded by: Shone Hughes

Personal details
- Born: December 1962 (age 63)
- Party: Plaid Cymru
- Education: University of Wales Trinity Saint David (BA and MA)

Celia Ann Davies (also known as Ann Bremenda) is a Welsh Plaid Cymru politician serving as Member of Parliament (MP) for Caerfyrddin since 2024.

Davies was also a councillor on Carmarthenshire County Council, and served before becoming an MP as cabinet member for rural affairs, community cohesion and planning policy.

== Early life and education ==
Celia Ann Davies was born in Llanarthney in 1962. She was educated at Queen Elizabeth Grammar School Carmarthen before studying a secretarial course at Pibwrlwyd Collage, Carmarthen.

As a child she was bullied because she had a stammer. She used bible verses and singing to practice, find strategies against stammering and improve her speech. Davies received help from a speech therapist and saw that the Young Farmers' Club helped her build her confidence.

She studied as a mature student in BA Early years and Education at Trinity Saint Davids, Carmarthen. She decided to do the evening course when she attended an open day with her daughter. At the end of their degrees she opened a nursery on her farm in Llanarthney with her daughter. She received a MA in Early Literacy and Bilingualism once again at the same university.

== Career ==
She started her career working in the insurance and banking industries. She then worked as a peripatetic music teacher.

Davies has experience in the agriculture sector and has farmed a tenant dairy farm in Llanarthney with her husband since 1992. She was also the co-owner of a local children's nursery and was a lecturer in early years learning at the University of Wales Trinity Saint David.

She started becoming an active member of Plaid Cymru at 18 years old. Davies stood to become a Carmarthenshire County Council member for Llanddarog in 2017 after her children had finished university education. She was appointed as a cabinet member of the Council in 2021 originally under the portfolio of Communities and Rural Affairs. This was expanded to include planning policy.

Since the announcement in 2023 of plans for a pylon line in the Towy Valley to connect a wind farm near Llandrindod Wells and a substation near Carmarthen, Davies has been involved in efforts to opposing the proposal. Davies and others have called for the consideration of alternative methods of energy transmission, in particular underground cables, which they argue could reduce the effect on the surrounding landscape.

On 4 July 2024, Davies was elected as the MP for Caerfyrddin, by 4,535 votes, a margin of 9.9% over Labour.

She received media attention as a new MP when supporters gathered at Carmarthen Railway Station on her first day traveling to Westminster to recreate the famous 1966 photo of Gwynfor Evans and to sing the national anthem of Wales as a 'send-off'.

== Volunteering ==
Between 2023 and 2025 Davies was the chairperson of the local Farmers Union of Wales branch. She was the Chair of Carmarthenshire Association of Voluntary Services.

== Personal life ==
Davies is a mother of three and a grandmother of seven children. She is a Christian and plays the organ at her local church, in addition to conducting local Gymanfaoedd ganu.
