= 1878 Carmarthen Boroughs by-election =

UK Parliamentary by-election in Wales

The 1878 Carmarthen Boroughs by-election was a parliamentary by-election held for the UK House of Commons constituency of Carmarthen Boroughs in West Wales on 11 May 1878.

== Vacancy ==
The by-election was caused by the resignation of the sitting Liberal MP, Sir Arthur Cowell-Stepney, 2nd Baronet.

== Candidates ==
The Liberals selected Benjamin Thomas Williams, QC, a successful barrister and a former Recorder of Carmarthen.

== The result ==
There being no other candidates putting themselves forward Williams was returned unopposed.

Carmarthen Boroughs by-election, 1878
Party	Candidate	Votes	%	±%
Liberal	Benjamin Thomas Williams	Unopposed		
Registered electors				
Liberal hold				

== See also ==
- Lists of United Kingdom by-elections
- United Kingdom by-election records
- Carmarthen by-election
