= 1928 Carmarthen by-election =

UK Parliamentary by-election in Wales

The 1928 Carmarthen by-election was a parliamentary by-election held for the British House of Commons constituency of Carmarthen in West Wales on 28 June 1928.

== Vacancy ==
The seat had become vacant when the constituency's Member of Parliament Alfred Mond had been elevated to the peerage as Baron Melchett.

Mond had held the seat since his election as a Liberal at the by-election in August 1924, and had been re-elected at the general election in October 1924 with a hefty majority over his only opponent, the Labour Party candidate Rev E.T. Owen. He defected to the Conservative Party in 1926 over the issue of land policy and David Lloyd George's proposal in the October 1925 publication Land and the Nation (also known as the Green Book) that some agricultural land be nationalised.

== Candidates ==
Three candidates contested the by-election.

After Mond's defection, the local Liberals had held an election to choose a successor to him to stand at the next election. This was initially contested by six candidates but four withdrew and the choice was between the businessman and soldier William Nathaniel Jones and Richard Thomas Evans of Cardiff. Jones won in a close contest by 149 votes to 147, having made clear he was an opponent of the Green Book land policy whereas Evans, who had worked closely with Lloyd George on other Liberal policies, was in favour.

The Conservatives had not fielded a candidate in 1924, and Mond had won easily in a straight fight with Labour. However this time, they put up the barrister, Sir Courtenay Mansel, another defector from the Liberal Party in 1926 who had been MP for Penryn and Falmouth from 1922 to 1923 but who had local connections in Carmarthenshire and was also a Justice of the Peace there.

The Labour Party nominated Major Daniel Hopkin MC, a barrister who had been born in South Wales but educated locally at Carmarthen College.

There was briefly the prospect of a four-cornered contest when National Party of Wales announced their intention to stand a candidate but in the end they decided not to fight.

== Result ==
The by-election took place on 28 June 1928 and Jones emerged as the narrow winner, with a majority of only 47 votes over Hopkin. Jones had made his opposition to the land policy a feature of the campaign in an attempt to retain the support of the division's farmers, many of whom shared Mond's concern about the nationalisation proposals. In any event the Green Book had by this time been withdrawn as a full statement of Liberal land policy. Instead, Jones promoted as the main object of Liberal land policy the desire to give security of tenure to tenant farmers. Many of those reliant on the land for their livelihood seemed to prefer the less radical solution of the government of Stanley Baldwin for the relief of rates on agricultural land.

== Aftermath ==
Jones held the seat for less than a year. At the general election in May 1929, Hopkin won the seat with a majority of 653 in another 3-way fight, and Jones never returned to the House of Commons.

1928 Carmarthen by-election
| Party | Candidate | Votes | % | ±% |
|---|---|---|---|---|
| Liberal | William Nathaniel Jones | 10,201 | 35.5 | −33.0 |
| Labour | Daniel Hopkin | 10,154 | 35.4 | +3.9 |
| Conservative | Courtenay Mansel | 8,361 | 29.1 | N/A |
| Majority | | 47 | 0.1 | −36.9 |
| Turnout | | 28,716 | 76.6 | +8.7 |
| Registered electors | | 37,482 | | |
| Liberal hold | | Swing | -18.5 | |

== See also ==
- 1882 Carmarthen Boroughs by-election
- 1924 Carmarthen by-election
- 1941 Carmarthen by-election
- 1957 Carmarthen by-election
- 1966 Carmarthen by-election
- Carmarthen (UK Parliament constituency)
- Lists of United Kingdom by-elections
