= Jennie Eirian Davies =

Welsh politician and magazine editor

Jennie Eirian Davies (6 January 1925 – 6 May 1982) was a Welsh politician and magazine editor.

== Early life ==
Jennie Howells was born in Llanpumsaint, Carmarthenshire and educated at the University College of Wales, Aberystwyth. She trained as a teacher.

== Political career ==
She stood as the Plaid Cymru candidate in the Carmarthen constituency at the 1955 general election winning 7.78% of the vote (3,835 votes) and in the historic 1957 by-election in the same Carmarthen constituency where she increased the Plaid Cymru share of the vote to 11.5% (5,741 votes). She was the first woman candidate for Plaid Cymru in Carmarthenshire. Politician Gwynfor Evans recalled her as an attractive and "most eloquent" candidate.

She was national president of Merched y Wawr during the period 1978–1980.

== Literature and journalism ==
Jennie Eirian Davies published three books for children in the early 1960s, and edited the children's magazine called Antur (Adventure). She wrote a newspaper column about radio and television for Y Cymro, a platform she used to call for more Welsh-language programming. In 1979 she became editor of the weekly magazine Y Faner and remained so until her death.

== Personal life ==
She married Reformed minister and poet, James Eirian Davies, in 1949. They had two sons, Sion Eirian and Guto Davies, born 1954 (right before Jennie stood for office the first time) and 1958 (not long after her second time as a candidate for office). Her son Siôn Eirian wrote screenplays and translated plays into Welsh.

Jennie Eirian Davies died suddenly in 1982, age 57. There is a memorial plaque for her in front of a church at Llanpumsaint.
