= Alfred Stevens =

Alfred Stevens may refer to:

- Alfred Stevens (painter) (1823–1906), Belgian painter
- Alfred Stevens (sculptor) (1818–1875), British sculptor

== See also ==
- Alfred George Stephens ('A. G. Stephens') (1865–1933), Australian writer
- Alfred Stephen (1802–1894), Australian judge
- Alfred Stephens (industrialist) (1871–1938), Welsh business man and politician
