= 1957 Carmarthen by-election =

UK Parliamentary by-election in Wales

← 1955	28 February 1957	1959 →

Constituency of Carmarthen
- Turnout: 87.40%
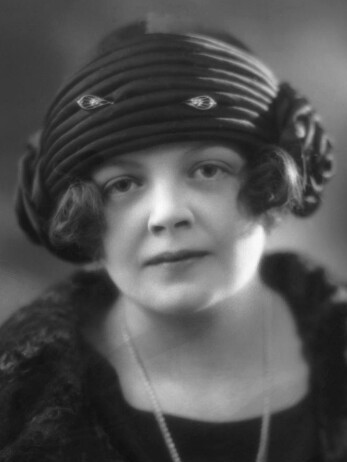
	First party	Second party	Third party
		Lib	PC
Candidate	Megan Lloyd George	John Morgan Davies	Jennie Eirian Davies
Party	Labour	Liberal	Plaid Cymru
Popular vote	23,679	20,610	5,741
Percentage	47.33%	41.20%	11.48%
Swing	▲4.60%	▼8.29%	▲3.70%
MP before election
Rhys Hopkin Morris
Liberal
Elected MP
Megan Lloyd George
Labour

The Carmarthen by-election of 1957 in Carmarthenshire, Wales, was notable for resulting in the nadir of the British Liberal Party.

== Background ==
The seat became vacant as a result of the death of Sir Rhys Hopkin Morris on 22 November 1956. The Liberal Party was in a period of decline and Hopkin Morris had been one of only six Liberal Members of Parliament. Hopkin Morris's majorities had been narrow and it was recognised that a significant number of voters had favoured him personally and might not transfer their allegiance to a new Liberal candidate.

Further distress for the Liberals was caused by the announcement that Lady Megan Lloyd George, a former Liberal MP with a national reputation, would be running as the Labour candidate. Previously selected prospective candidate for Labour, Brynley Thomas, stood down in her favour. The local Liberals created another dilemma by choosing John Morgan Davies as their candidate; the Liberals were seeking to challenge the ruling Conservatives over the ongoing Suez Crisis and Morgan Davies, like Hopkin Morris, had publicly taken a pro-government stand on the issue. Jo Grimond, who had assumed leadership of the Liberal Party only a few weeks before, had to choose whether to support or disown Morgan Davies. He chose to support him.

The other candidate who ran for the seat was Jennie Eirian Davies of Plaid Cymru.

The Conservatives did not run a candidate. They had not contested the seat since 1935, as one of several seats where the local Conservative and Liberal parties came to agreements where one party would not field a candidate, in order to avoid vote-splitting that could allow Labour to win. This was the second to last by-election in Great Britain, during the 20th century, in which they did not stand, the last being the unusual circumstances of the 1963 Bristol South East by-election.

== Result ==
The election was held on 28 February 1957. Lloyd George won the seat, swinging the constituency from Liberal to Labour and dropping the Liberal Party to their historic low of only five seats in Parliament.

1957 Carmarthen by-election
Party	Candidate	Votes	%	±%
Labour	Megan Lloyd George	23,679	47.3	+4.6
Liberal	John Morgan Davies	20,610	41.2	−8.3
Plaid Cymru	Jennie Eirian Davies	5,741	11.5	+3.7
Majority		3,069	6.1	N/A
Turnout		50,030	87.5	+2.4
Registered electors		57,183		
Labour gain from Liberal		Swing	+6.5	

== See also ==
- 1882 Carmarthen Boroughs by-election
- 1924 Carmarthen by-election
- 1928 Carmarthen by-election
- 1941 Carmarthen by-election
- 1966 Carmarthen by-election
