= Roger Thomas (British politician) =

British politician

Member of Parliament for Carmarthen
- In office 1979–1987

Member of the Dyfed County Council
- In office 1977–1979

Personal details
- Born: 14 November 1925 Garnant, Carmarthenshire, Wales
- Died: 4 September 1994 (aged 68) London, England
- Party: Labour
- Spouse: Margaret Indeg Thomas
- Education: London Hospital Medical School
- Occupation: physician and politician

Military service
- Branch/service: Royal Army Medical Corps
- Rank: captain

Roger Gareth Thomas (14 November 1925 – 4 September 1994) was a British Labour Party politician and Member of Parliament.

== Biography ==
He was born at Garnant, Carmarthenshire, on 14 November 1925, the son of Evan J. Thomas, a coalminer who later became a baker, and Beryl Thomas. The family was Welsh-speaking and left-wing. Thomas inherited a fierce anti-Conservative standpoint which remained with him throughout his life. He received his education at Amman Valley Grammar School in Ammanford, and the London Hospital Medical School. He qualified as a medical practitioner in 1948 just as the National Health Service was beginning. He served as a captain in the Royal Army Medical Corps (national service), 1949–52, a period during which he saw service in west Africa. He returned to south Wales to practise as a family doctor in the Cross Hands area between Port Talbot and Carmarthen in 1952, serving the local community there for more than forty years.

He joined the Labour Party in 1970, securing election as the Labour member for the Saron ward on the Dyfed County Council where he served from 1977 until 1979.

In 1979, Thomas was elected Member of Parliament for Carmarthen, defeating the President of Plaid Cymru, Gwynfor Evans. It was one of only two Labour gains throughout the whole of Great Britain in that general election which saw Margaret Thatcher and the Conservatives sweep to power at Westminster. He continued to represent the constituency until his resignation in 1987, having successfully fought off a powerful challenge from the Conservatives in the person of Nigel Thomas in the June 1983 general election. A member of the Fabian Society, he was appointed a member of the Select Committee on Welsh Affairs in 1979 and he was also opposition spokesman on Welsh Affairs.

He was one of the few Labour MPs to represent a predominantly rural area and concentrated on agriculture and EEC issues. Although mildly supportive of devolution, Thomas was opposed to what he regarded as the excesses of Welsh nationalism. In 1980 he complained about a perceived bias towards Plaid Cymru in Welsh-language television programmes, a complaint that was not upheld.

On 30 January 1984 Thomas was convicted at Gowerton Magistrates' Court, Swansea, of importuning for immoral purposes at a men's public lavatory (he was fined £75). The case was reported and attracted negative publicity for Thomas, who announced to Carmarthen Constituency Labour Party on 2 March that he would resign his seat. He subsequently delayed his resignation, after pressure from within the party.

In the meantime, Thomas continued his Parliamentary activity and remained one of the most active Welsh MPs of all. He also received a good deal of sympathy on his plight, and times had moved on since William Field was forced to resign in similar circumstances thirty years before. A similar scandal involving the Conservative MP Keith Hampson deflected some attention. Thomas was pressed to stay on by the Labour whips, who feared the loss of the marginal seat in a by-election. On 17 August he announced he would remain until the dissolution of Parliament.

The selection of a new Labour Candidate for the constituency in 1985 proved acrimonious, Thomas' preferred candidate was a London-based trade union official and London Borough of Bromley Councillor, Ira Walters. Walters, a Gorseinon-born Welsh Speaker was, at 23, the youngest candidate in the 1983 general election, contesting the Conwy Constituency. In the 1985 selection, he acquired the majority of branch nominations in the Constituency, largely from the eastern, industrialised areas of the Constituency. His was a controversial nomination given that he was a Political Assistant to Eric Hammond, General Secretary of the Electricians' Trade Union, which was at odds with the majority of trade union views on the major industrial disputes at that time. Walters, despite being the favourite to gain the nomination, lost to the local Trinity College lecturer, Alan Williams, who went on to win the seat in the subsequent general election.

Thomas duly retired from Parliament at the dissolution in 1987. He was married, 1958, to Margaret Indeg Thomas, the daughter of a minister with the Welsh Independents. They had one son and one daughter. They lived at Ffynnon Wen, Capel Hendre, Ammanford. Roger Thomas died on 4 September 1994 and was cremated at Swansea Crematorium.

Parliament of the United Kingdom
Preceded by Gwynfor Evans	Member of Parliament for Carmarthen; 1979–1987	Succeeded by Alan Williams
