= 1966 Carmarthen by-election =

UK Parliamentary by-election in Wales

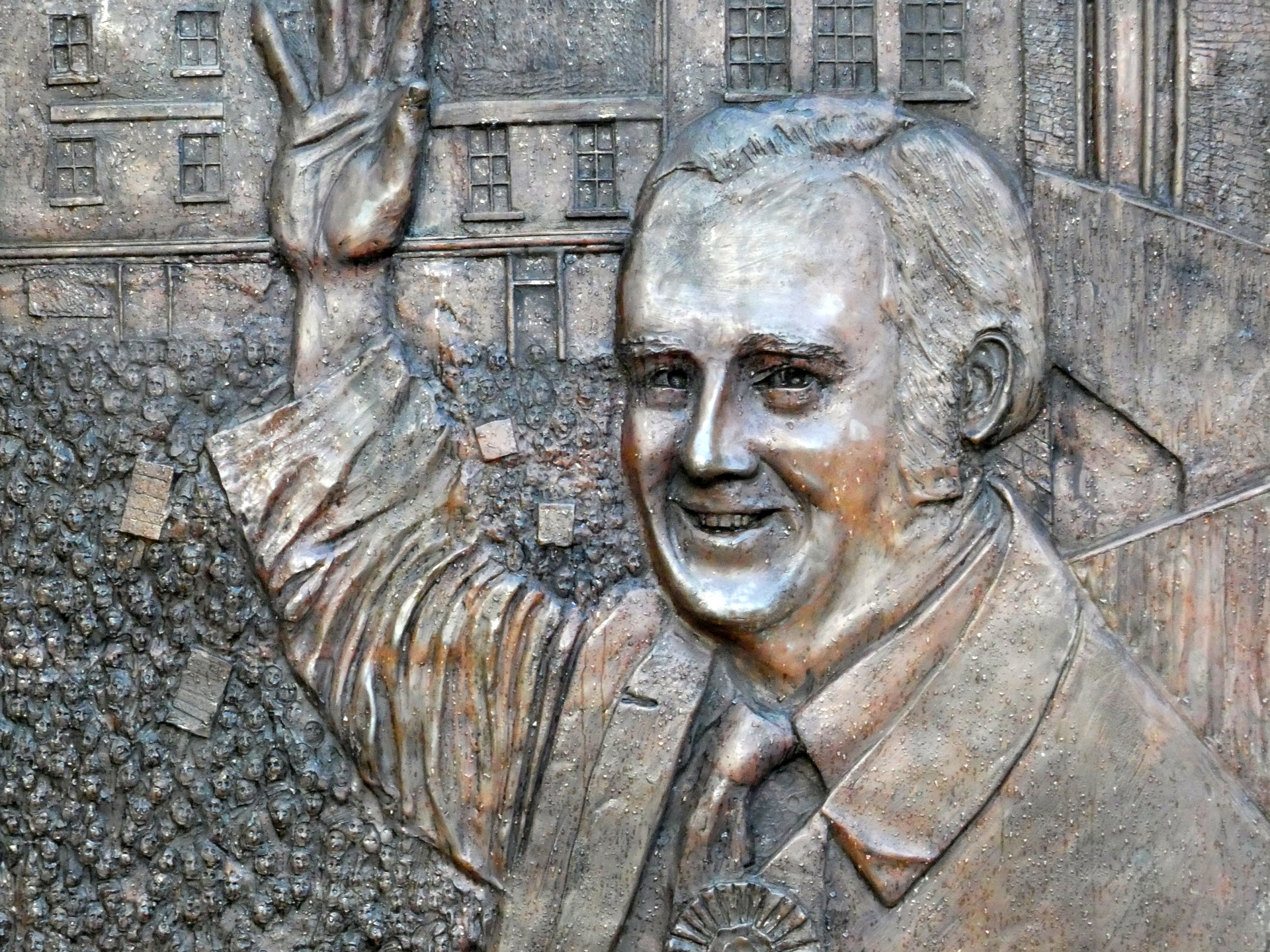
Gwynfor Evans commemorative plaque in Carmarthen based on the night of the election.

The 1966 Carmarthen by-election, was held in Carmarthen, Wales, on 14 July 1966. The contest was significant in that it resulted in the election of Gwynfor Evans, the first ever Plaid Cymru member of parliament. Plaid Cymru's victory in the Carmarthen constituency, a seminal moment for Welsh nationalism, was part of a wider process toward Welsh devolution which eventually led to the establishment of the Welsh Assembly in 1999.

The election was caused by the death of Labour Party member of parliament Megan Lloyd George.

Sensing rising nationalist feeling in Wales, to fight the election Labour selected Gwilym Davies, a Welsh-speaking solicitor who was an active supporter of the Welsh language and had previously been a member of Plaid Cymru.

Gwynfor Evans's surprise win is credited with laying the foundations for Winnie Ewing's victory for the Scottish National Party at the 1967 Hamilton by-election, an event of equal significance for Scottish nationalism.

== Result ==
1966 Carmarthen by-election
Party	Candidate	Votes	%	±%
Plaid Cymru	Gwynfor Evans	16,179	39.0	+22.8
Labour	Gwilym P. Davies	13,743	33.1	−13.1
Liberal	Hywel Davies	8,650	20.8	−5.3
Conservative	Simon Day	2,934	7.1	−4.5
Majority		2,436	5.9	N/A
Turnout		41,506	74.9	−7.7
Registered electors		55,407		
Plaid Cymru gain from Labour		Swing	+12.0	

== See also ==
- 1882 Carmarthen Boroughs by-election
- 1924 Carmarthen by-election
- 1928 Carmarthen by-election
- 1941 Carmarthen by-election
- 1957 Carmarthen by-election
- Carmarthen (UK Parliament constituency)
- Royal Commission on the Constitution (United Kingdom)
