= Alan Williams (Carmarthen MP) =

British politician (born 1945)

Member of Parliament for Carmarthen East and Dinefwr Carmarthen (1987–1997)
- In office 11 June 1987 – 14 May 2001
- Preceded by: Roger Thomas
- Succeeded by: Adam Price

Personal details
- Born: Alan Wynne Williams; 21 December 1945 (age 80) Carmarthen, Carmarthenshire, Wales
- Party: Labour

Alan Wynne Williams (born 21 December 1945) is a British Labour politician.

Williams was born in Carmarthen. He studied at Carmarthen Grammar School and Jesus College, Oxford. He was elected Member of Parliament for Carmarthen in 1987. Following constituency boundary changes in 1997, his seat was renamed Carmarthen East and Dinefwr. In 2001, however, he lost his seat to the Plaid Cymru candidate Adam Price.

Parliament of the United Kingdom
Preceded by Roger Thomas	Member of Parliament for Carmarthen; 1987–1997	Constituency abolished
New constituency	Member of Parliament for Carmarthen East and Dinefwr; 1997–2001	Succeeded by Adam Price
