= Gwynoro Jones =

British politician (born 1942)

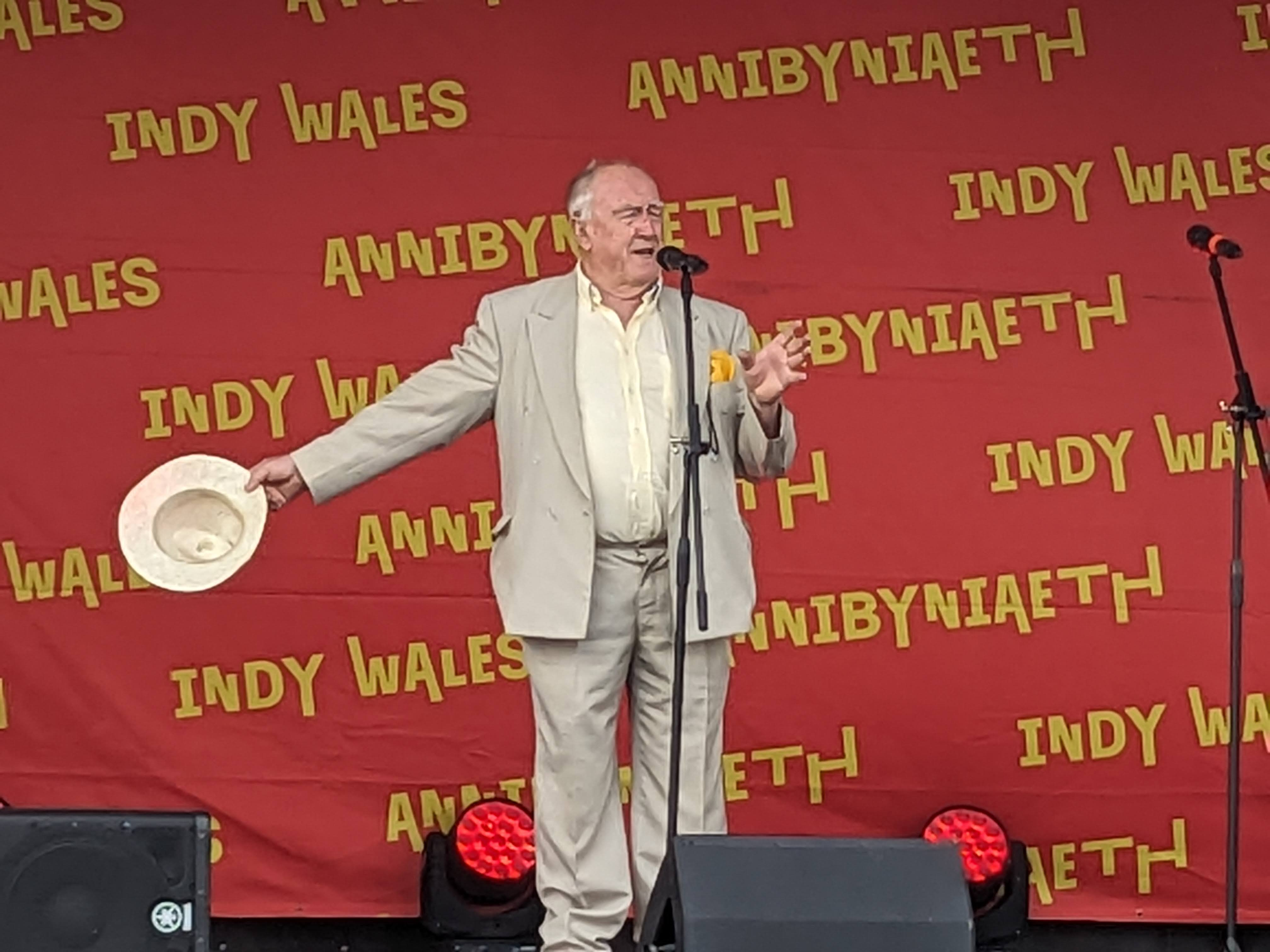
- Gwynoro Jones at a Carmarthen independence rally, 2024

Member of Parliament for Carmarthen
- In office 18 June 1970 – 20 September 1974
- Preceded by: Gwynfor Evans
- Succeeded by: Gwynfor Evans

Personal details
- Born: Gwynoro Glyndwr Jones; 21 November 1942 (age 83)
- Party: Labour (until 1981); SDP (1981–1988); Liberal Democrats (since 1988)

Gwynoro Glyndwr Jones (born 21 November 1942) is a Welsh politician who served as a Labour Member of Parliament. He was a schools inspector for 18 years; he has also been a broadcaster, political commentator and journalist. As a politician, he is best remembered for his long struggle to hold the mainly Welsh-speaking constituency of Carmarthen for the Labour Party against Plaid Cymru leader Gwynfor Evans, about which he wrote a book in the Welsh language.

== Early life ==
Before entering Parliament, Jones was Public Relations Officer for the Labour Party in Wales 1968. Together with Emrys Jones, Regional Organiser for the Wales Labour Party, and Gwyn Morgan, Assistant General Secretary to the UK Party, he drafted Labour's evidence to the Crowther/Kilbrandon Royal Commission on the Constitution.

== Member of Parliament ==
In 1970, at the age of 27, he was elected Member of Parliament (MP) for Carmarthen, defeating the president of Plaid Cymru, Gwynfor Evans, with a majority of 3,600 votes. He held on to the seat by just 3 votes (with five recounts) at the February 1974 general election. In 1974, whilst serving in Parliament, he was Parliamentary Secretary to Roy Jenkins, the Home Secretary, and was also a member of the Council of Europe. Throughout his time in Parliament, he campaigned for more devolution for Wales, an issue that split the Welsh Labour Party deeply.

In June 1974, in a letter to the Executive of the Carmarthen Constituency Labour Party, he warned of the dangers of the ever leftward drift of the party, saying: "I cannot any longer conceal my acute concern about some developments in the Labour Party which will in my view not enhance the prospects of the Labour Party and will also affect the longer term unity of the Labour Movement. I happen to believe strongly in the principles of Social Democracy." Jones lost his seat back to Evans by 3,640 votes at the October election of that year. When, in 1975, Prime Minister Harold Wilson held a referendum on Britain's membership of the European Economic Community (EEC), Jones was the Campaign Organiser in mid/west Wales for a 'Yes' vote.

During the period in which Jenkins was in Brussels as President of the European Commission, the two communicated on a frequent basis as to how a new third force in British politics could be established.

== After Parliament ==
Jones, alongside former MP William Edwards and future MPs Ron Davies and Ann Clwyd unsuccessfully sought the Labour nomination for Ogmore ahead of the 1979 general election.

In 1981, he helped establish the Social Democratic Party. Together with Tom Ellis, former MP for Wrexham, and others, he created a powerful Welsh voice within the UK SDP. Jones stood in the Gower by-election of 1982 when Labour's 19,000 majority was reduced to 7,000. He was Chair of the SDP in Wales for two three-year periods before the merger of the SDP with the Liberals. During the days of the SDP-Liberal Alliance he chaired its National Committee in Wales from 1983 to 1989. In the 1980s, Jones became a powerful advocate for constitutional and electoral reform, and was a renowned orator at conferences and public meetings across the UK. A strong advocate of the alliance with the Liberals, he was often at loggerheads with David Owen. At the merger debate in Sheffield during February 1988, Jones referring to Owen's refusal to join the SDP in a merged party with the Liberals was famously reported as telling delegates "you can't change British politics on the basis of hero worship."

When the Liberal Democrats was formed, he stood for the party presidency and received over 10,000 votes. He topped the poll in the vote for the party's National Committee, and became vice chair of the Policy Committee. In the 1992 election, he stood for the Liberal Democrats in Hereford and received over 23,000 votes.

After that, Jones concentrated on his business activities, and from 1993 until 2012 was head of EPPC-Severn Crossing Ltd, a school inspection and conferencing business. During that period the company inspected over 10,000 educational establishments in England and Wales. Jones visited some 1000 of Wales's schools on inspections and regularly expressed concerns about standards in teaching, learning and performance. In August 2012 it was reported that EPPC-Severn Crossing had debts of £180,000 in the autumn of 2011 and some sub-contracted inspectors had not been paid for inspections they had done. During the following year these matters were resolved. When the contractual arrangements for the administration of school inspections were changed by the Welsh Government and Estyn from September 2012 the company ceased trading. In addition to being a Lay Inspector of schools he was also an Investors in People Adviser/Assessor, External Assessor Performance Management of Headteachers, External Assessor for EFQM European Business Excellence Model, Consultant/Assessor Law Society Lexcel Standard and Health Inspectorate Wales lay inspector.

In 2007, he was greatly supportive of the 'Rainbow Alliance' proposals, which aimed to form a joint coalition administration in the National Assembly of Wales between Plaid Cymru, the Liberal Democrats and the Conservatives, being disappointed at the eventual formation of a Labour/Plaid coalition for the Assembly term 2007–11. He rejoined the Liberal Democrats in 2011, citing Nick Clegg's courage in entering a coalition in Westminster, but was also known to have said at the time "I understand why it is happening but no good will come of it." He soon became a critic of the way the coalition was operating and the damage it was doing to the party's electoral prospects.

Following the UK general election of May 2015, Jones again became active in politics, expressing his determination to do what he could to rebuild the party that he had actively helped to develop in the 1980s. He is an active blogger and has his own YouTube channel. He was particularly saddened by the passing of former Liberal Democrat leader Charles Kennedy and has been critical of Plaid Cymru's performance in the Welsh Assembly.

He is a passionate European, and was the Vice Chair of the Wales Council of the European Movement. Constitutional and electoral reform are other campaigns he actively supports; he is a member of the Electoral Reform Society.

He has also came out in favour of Welsh independence. In June 2024 he spoke at a rally in favour of Welsh Independence in Carmarthen.

Since September 2019, he has been an Executive Consultant with WalesOnline and Llanelli Online.

On 11 April 2025, he appeared at Swansea Crown Court charged with sexual assuault of a woman on a train on 11 June 2024 and pleaded not guilty. He stood trial on 20 July 2026 and was acquitted.

== Bibliography ==
- Times Guide to the House of Commons October 1974
- Leigh Rayment's Historical List of MPs

Parliament of the United Kingdom
Preceded by Gwynfor Evans	Member of Parliament for Carmarthen; 1970 – October 1974	Succeeded by Gwynfor Evans
