= 1941 Carmarthen by-election =

UK Parliamentary by-election in Wales

A by-election was held for the British House of Commons constituency of Carmarthen on 26 March 1941. The seat had become vacant on the resignation of the Labour Member of Parliament Major Daniel Hopkin MC, who had held the seat since the 1935 general election.

The Labour candidate, Moelwyn Hughes, was elected unopposed. He represented the constituency until his defeat at the 1945 general election.

1941 Carmarthen by-election
| Party | Candidate | Votes | % | ±% |
|---|---|---|---|---|
| Labour | Moelwyn Hughes | Unopposed | | |
| Registered electors | | | | |
| Labour hold | | | | |

== See also ==
- 1882 Carmarthen Boroughs by-election
- 1924 Carmarthen by-election
- 1928 Carmarthen by-election
- 1957 Carmarthen by-election
- 1966 Carmarthen by-election
- Carmarthen (UK Parliament constituency)
- Lists of United Kingdom by-elections
