= Megan Lloyd George =

Welsh politician (1902–1966)

Lady Megan Lloyd George CH
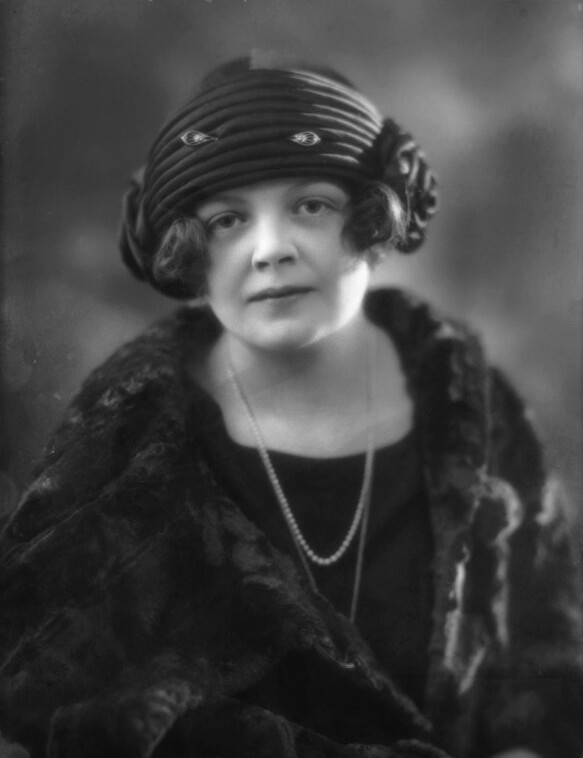
- Lloyd George in 1923

Deputy Leader of the Liberal Party
- In office 12 January 1949 – 25 October 1951
- Leader: Clement Davies
- Preceded by: Percy Harris (1945)
- Succeeded by: Donald Wade (1962)

Member of Parliament for Carmarthen
- In office 1 March 1957 – 14 May 1966
- Preceded by: Rhys Hopkin Morris
- Succeeded by: Gwynfor Evans

Member of Parliament for Anglesey
- In office 30 May 1929 – 5 October 1951
- Preceded by: Robert Thomas
- Succeeded by: Cledwyn Hughes

Personal details
- Born: Megan Arvon George; 22 April 1902 Criccieth, Caernarfonshire, Wales, UK
- Died: 14 May 1966 (aged 64) Pwllheli, Caernarfonshire, Wales, UK
- Party: Labour (from 1955)
- Other political affiliations: Liberal (1929–31, 1935–55); Independent Liberals (1931–35)
- Domestic partner: Philip Noel-Baker (1936–1956)
- Parents: David Lloyd George (father); Margaret Owen (mother)

Lady Megan Arvon Lloyd George, CH (22 April 1902 – 14 May 1966) was a Welsh politician and the first female Member of Parliament (MP) for a Welsh constituency. She also served as Deputy Leader of the Liberal Party, before later becoming a Labour MP, serving in Parliament for 30 years. In 2016, she was named as one of "the 50 greatest Welsh men and women of all time".

== Background ==
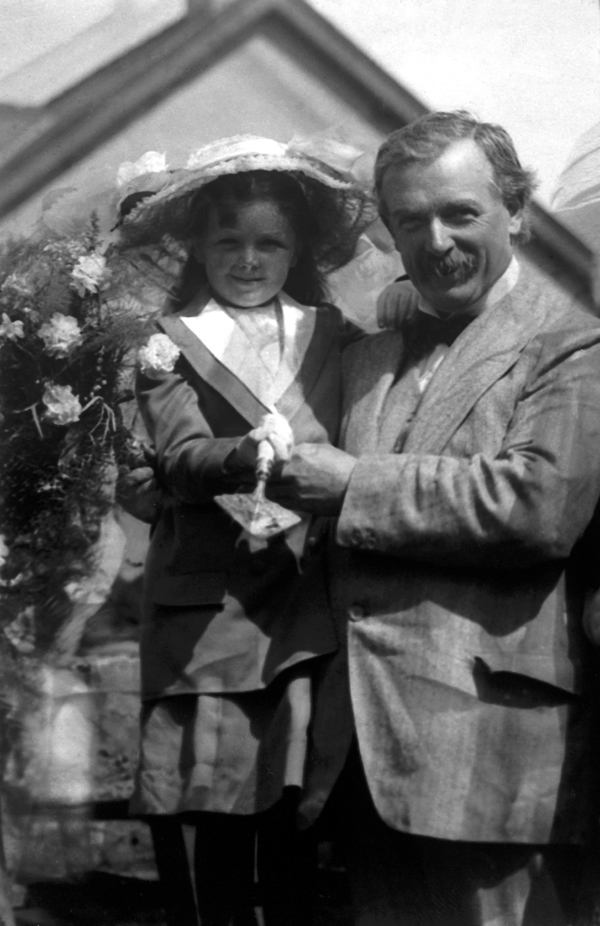
Megan with her father

She was the youngest child of David Lloyd George and his wife, Margaret, being born in 1902 in Criccieth, Caernarfonshire. Her name at birth was registered with forenames Megan Arvon and surname George, but she adopted her father's barrelled surname "Lloyd George". As her father was raised to the peerage as Earl Lloyd-George of Dwyfor in 1945, she gained the style of Lady Megan (Lloyd George).

== Childhood ==
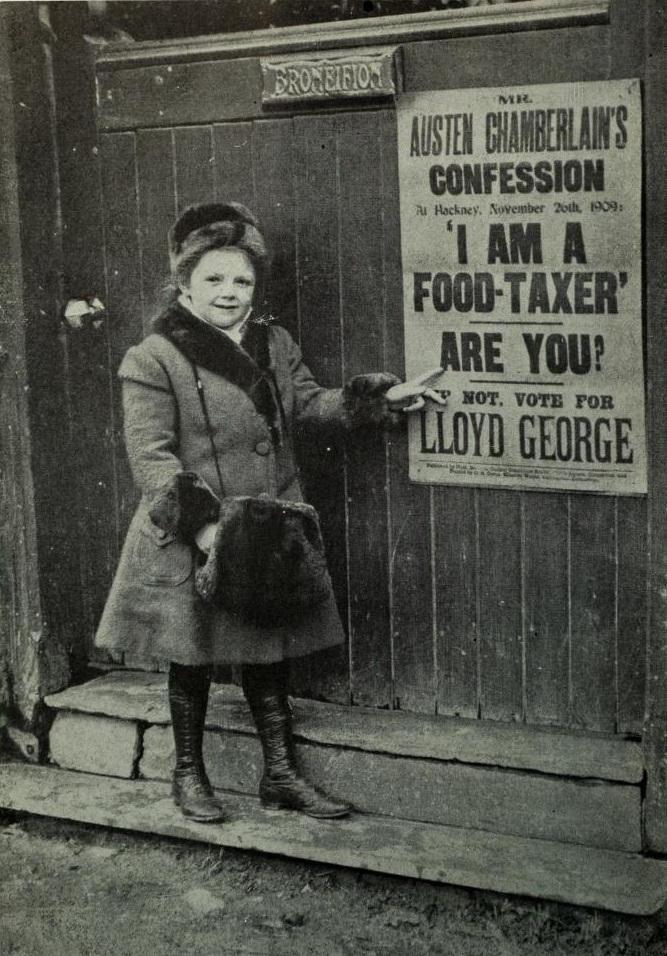
Megan in 1910 aged 7

Lloyd George was imaginative and "sprite-like" when young, and was described in the local press as a "daring sceptic", disliking her father's stories of Daniel in the lions' den. Around the age of five, she would travel with her father to their house in Brighton, and delight his guests by bringing them an early morning cup of tea while they were still in bed.

She began public engagements at an early age, and on 16 November 1910, at the age of eight, performed the opening ceremony of the extension of the Claremont Central Mission in Pentonville.

== Liberal Party ==
Like her brother, Gwilym, she followed her father into politics. She became the first female MP in Wales when she won Anglesey for the Liberals in 1929.

Along with her father, she refused to support Ramsay MacDonald's National Government in 1931 and successfully held Anglesey as an opposition Liberal at the 1931 General Election. She held the seat again as a Liberal from 1935 to 1951. During World War II, she was a member of Radical Action, which called for a more radical political stance and for the party to withdraw from the war-time electoral truce.

Throughout the 1940s and 1950s, she campaigned for a Welsh Parliament and the creation of a Secretary of State for Wales. Prominent among the radicals in the Liberal Party, she opposed what she saw as the party's drift away from her father's brand of liberalism. During the late 1940s, Lady Megan (as she was universally known) remained on friendly terms with Clement Attlee and there were rumours that she would join the Labour Party. In 1949, Lady Megan was elected Deputy Leader of the Liberal Party in a bid to create unity, but after losing her seat she stood down in 1952. Disillusioned with the Liberals, she indicated in November that year that she would not stand again in Anglesey.

== Labour Party ==
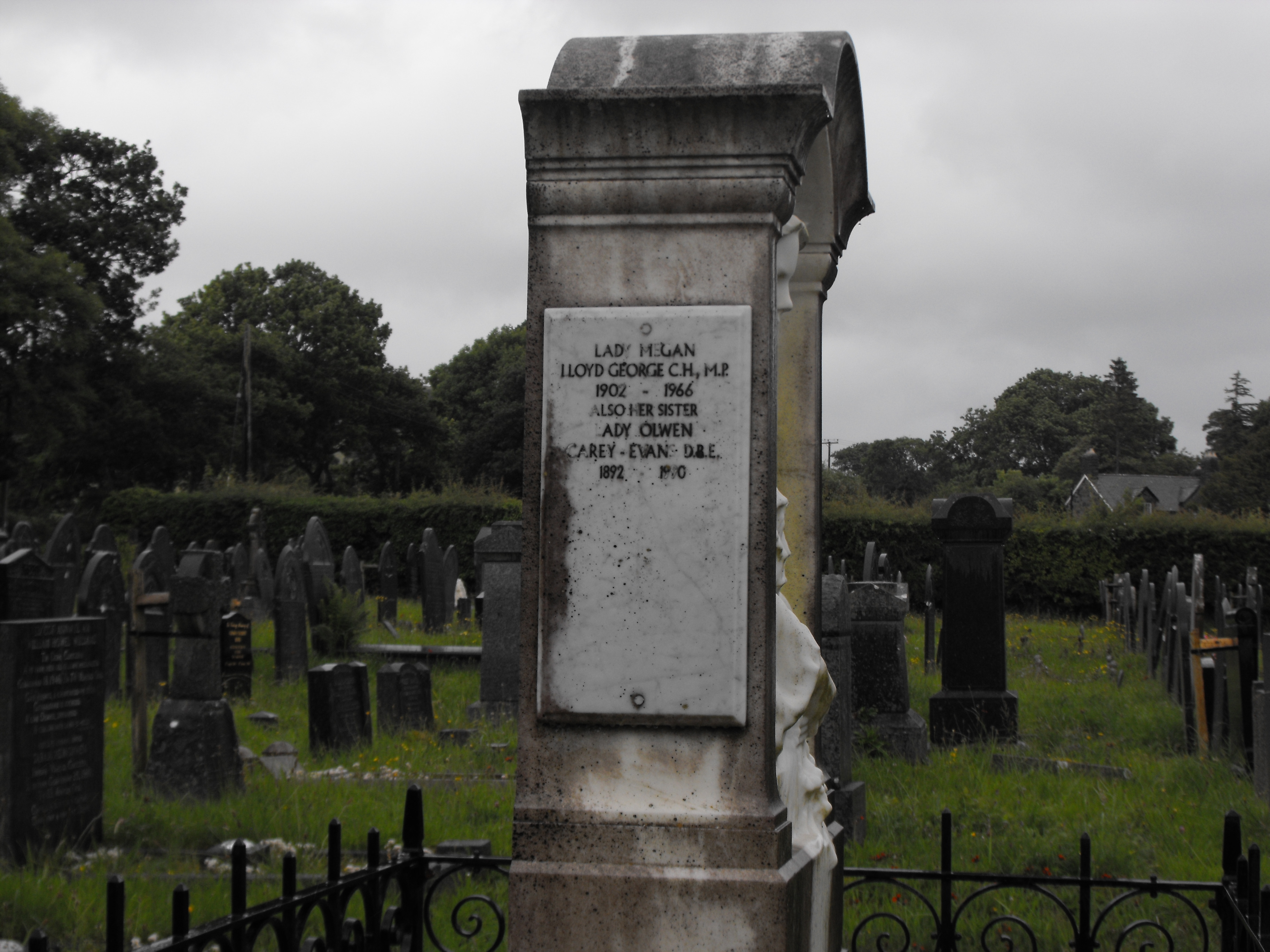
Family grave in Criccieth

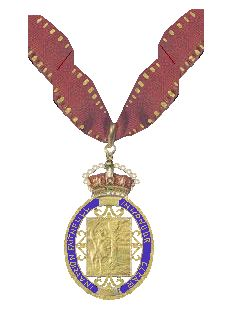
Insignia of Member of the Order of the Companions of Honour

In 1955, Lady Megan defected to the Labour Party. In 1957, she stood against the Liberals as the Labour Party candidate at a by-election in Carmarthen and won the seat, which she held until her death from breast cancer at Pwllheli in 1966, aged 64. After her death, the 1966 Carmarthen by-election occurred which was won by Gwynfor Evans becoming the first Plaid Cymru MP.

== Private life ==
She was Philip Noel-Baker's romantic partner from 1936 until Irene Noel-Baker's death in 1956.

== Awards and legacy ==
She was posthumously appointed as a Member of the Order of the Companions of Honour in the Dissolution Honours List published five days after her death.

In 2016 she was included in a list of "the 50 greatest Welsh men and women of all time".

In 2019 a Purple Plaque to commemorate her was installed on the building that had been her family home in Cricieth.

== Sources ==
- Jones, J. Graham (June 1993). "The Liberal Party and Wales, 1945–79" (PDF). Welsh History Review. 16 (3): 326–55.
- Jones, J. Graham, entry in Dictionary of Liberal Biography Brack et al. (eds.) Politico's Publishing, 1998
- Jones, J. Graham, 'A breach in the family: the defection from the Liberal Party of Megan and Gwilym Lloyd George'
- Jones, Mervyn. A Radical Life: The Biography of Megan Lloyd George, 1902–66. London: Hutchinson, 1991. ISBN 0-09-174829-1
- Price, Emyr Megan Lloyd George; Gwynedd Archives Service, 1983

Parliament of the United Kingdom
Preceded by Sir Robert Thomas	Member of Parliament for Anglesey; 1929 – 1951	Succeeded by Cledwyn Hughes
Preceded by Sir Rhys Hopkin Morris	Member of Parliament for Carmarthen; 1957 – 1966	Succeeded by Gwynfor Evans
Party political offices
Vacant Title last held by Percy Harris	Deputy Leader of the Liberal Party; 1949–1951	Vacant Title next held by Donald Wade
