= Gwilym Prys Davies, Baron Prys-Davies =

British politician (1923–2017)

The Right Honourable The Lord Prys-Davies
- Prys-Davies in the House of Lords, 2008

Member of the House of Lords
- Lord Temporal
- Life peerage 9 February 1983 – 23 May 2015

Personal details
- Born: 8 December 1923
- Died: 28 March 2017 (aged 93)

Gwilym Prys Prys-Davies, Baron Prys-Davies (born Gwilym Prys Davies; 8 December 1923 – 28 March 2017) was a Welsh solicitor and Labour activist. He was a pioneer of the use of the Welsh language in the courts, and in 1982 he was appointed to the House of Lords as a life peer and became the first member to take the oath of allegiance in Welsh.

== Biography ==
Gwilym Prys Davies was born in the village of Llanegryn, in Meirionnydd, Wales. He served in the Royal Navy during the Second World War, on North Atlantic Convoys. After the war was over, he went to the University College of Wales, Aberystwyth to study law. This is where he met Llinos Evans, to whom he would be married for over fifty years until her death in 2010. By 1956 he had qualified as a solicitor and was working at a legal practice in Pontypridd, pioneering the use of the Welsh language in the courts.

His political career started with Plaid Cymru, before he moved to Labour after the Welsh Socialist Republican Movement, of which he was a founder and strong supporter, failed to influence party policy. He also believed that change could be better made by working within a larger, less nationalistic, party that was in power, rather than a smaller, more nationalistic, party that was not in power. He was always a strong advocate of devolution for Wales. He was the Labour candidate in the 1966 Carmarthen by-election but lost to the first Plaid Cymru member to be a member of parliament, a historic event in Welsh politics. He went on to support devolution within the Labour Party with the aim of securing "political responsibility for Welsh life".

Davies became a member of the Welsh Hospitals' Board and ensured that the parents of the victims of the 1966 Aberfan disaster were represented in courts by Desmond Ackner QC, an able barrister. After John Morris, now Lord Morris of Aberavon, was appointed Secretary of State for Wales, he appointed Gwilym Prys Davies as his special advisor. In 1968 he was appointed an Officer of the Most Venerable Order of the Hospital of St John of Jerusalem (OStJ).

He was appointed as a life peer in 1982, and was the first member of the House of Lords to take his oath in Welsh. Before becoming a peer he changed his name from Gwilym Prys Davies to Gwilym Prys Prys-Davies by Deed Poll to enable him to take the title Baron Prys-Davies, of Llanegryn in the County of Gwynedd. The intention of the change was to keep the name Prys, which was said to be due his being to a distant relation of the clergyman and poet Edmund Prys (1542/3 – 1623). In the Lords, he was opposition frontbench spokesperson for Health between 1983 and 1987, for Northern Ireland between 1982 and 1993 and for the Welsh Office between 1987 and 1997. He retired from the House of Lords on 23 May 2015.

== Sources ==
- Parliament.uk Biography
- Hansard
- BBC News Obituary
- Mosley, Charles, ed. (2003). Burke's Peerage & Baronetage, 107th edn. London: Burke's Peerage & Gentry Ltd. p. 3229 (PRYS-DAVIES, LP). ISBN 0-9711966-2-1.
