= Daniel Hopkin =

British politician (1886–1951)

Major Daniel Hopkin MC (July 1886 – 30 Aug 1951) was a British soldier, barrister and Labour Party politician.

== Early life ==
Hopkin was born in Llantwit Major in South Wales, the son of a farm labourer who died in 1893 when Daniel was seven. After elementary school, he was a teacher in Llantwit Major School until 1905, when he left to study at Carmarthen Training College. He then won an exhibition to study at St Catharine's College, Cambridge, where he read history and law.

During the First World War, Hopkin served as an officer with the Royal Fusiliers. He was awarded the Military Cross in 1916 for conspicuous gallantry. After the war ended he spent "four years in business in Cairo" before training to become a barrister, where he served on the South Wales Circuit. He rejoined the army at the start of the Second World War in 1939.

== Politics ==
He was elected at the 1929 general election as Member of Parliament (MP) for Carmarthen in South Wales, becoming the first Labour MP for the historically Liberal Party-held seat. He had narrowly failed to win the seat at a by-election in 1928, and his slender majority in 1929 was overturned by the Liberals the 1931 general election, as Labour's share of the vote nationally plummeted when the party split over Ramsay MacDonald's decision to form a National Government with the Conservative Party.

Hopkin regained the seat with a large majority at the 1935 general election, and held it until his resignation in 1941 to become a Metropolitan Police magistrate.

His son Sir David Hopkin (1922–1997) was also a Metropolitan Stipendiary Magistrate for over 20 years, rising to Chief Metropolitan Stipendiary Magistrate, but is probably best known as the chairman and later President of the British Boxing Board of Control.

Parliament of the United Kingdom
Preceded by William Nathaniel Jones	Member of Parliament for Carmarthen; 1929 – 1931	Succeeded by Richard Thomas Evans
Preceded by Richard Thomas Evans	Member of Parliament for Carmarthen; 1935 – 1941	Succeeded by Moelwyn Hughes
