= Alfred Stephens (industrialist) =

Welsh industrialist

Sir Alfred Stephens
- Born: June 7, 1871; Llanelli, Carmarthenshire, Wales, United Kingdom
- Died: November 28, 1938 (aged 67)
- Education: Victoria University of Manchester, Cardiff University
- Occupation(s): Industrialist, businessman and local politician
- Known for: Chairman of Stephens Silica Brick Co. Ltd.
- Spouse: Margaret Emily Bryant (m. 1899)

Sir Alfred Stephens (7 June 1871 – 28 November 1938) was a Welsh business man and local politician, Chairman of Stephens Silica Brick Co. Ltd. and High Sheriff of Carmarthenshire for 1922. He was knighted in 1923.

== Early life ==
Born in Llanelli, Carmarthenshire, in 1871, Stephens was the son of Daniel Stephens of The Arlais, Kidwelly, and his wife Catherine Thompson, who had been married at St Mary Redcliffe, Bristol, on 1 February 1870. His grandfathers were David Stephens, a farmer, and Thomas Thompson, a coppersmith. He was educated at the Lycée de Caen, Owens College, Manchester (a college of the Victoria University), and the University College of South Wales and Monmouthshire, taking a degree in natural science.

Stephens's father, now Alderman Daniel Stephens JP, and head of the firm of Stephens and Co., Silica Brick Manufacturers, died on 19 October 1907, leaving an estate valued for probate at £26,695, equivalent to £3,567,042 in 2023, giving an interest for life in most of it to his widow, Catherine Stephens, his house at Kidwelly and an annuity to his daughter Florence Emily Stephens, an annuity to his daughter Annie Priscilla, and the ultimate residue to his only son, Alfred.

== Career ==
While pursuing his business career, Stephens was the member of Carmarthenshire County Council for Kidwelly from 1898 to 1934 and of Kidwelly Town Council from 1896 until his death, serving as Mayor for a year four times between 1902 and 1928. A justice of the peace, he was High Sheriff of Carmarthenshire for 1922, and was chairman of Stephens Silica Brick Company.

In the 1923 Birthday Honours, announced on 29 June 1923, Stephens was knighted "for public and political services in Carmarthenshire". Later that year, he was the Unionist (Conservative) candidate for Carmarthen at the election of December 1923. A Welsh speaker and an employer of labour in the constituency, he was seen as a serious contender, but lost to a Liberal, Ellis Ellis-Griffith. The election produced a hung parliament and the first-ever Labour government. Ellis-Griffith had not supported this development, and local Liberals wanted him to face the electorate over the issue. Ellis-Griffith resigned his seat, triggering the 1924 Carmarthen by-election, but did not stand again. Stephens did stand again, but lost this time to another Liberal, Sir Alfred Mond. Stephens did not stand for parliament again.

In his later years, Stephens became Chairman of Carmarthenshire County Council and of the Towy Fishery Board and the Teify and Ayron Fishery Board. He was also a Member of the Lord Lieutenant’s Advisory Committee.

== Personal life ==
In 1899, at Westbury-on-Trym, Stephens married Margaret Emily Bryant, a daughter of William Richard Bryant, of Redland, Bristol, gentleman, and they had five daughters.

In 1900, he was elected as a member of the Junior Carlton Club and also belonged to the Carmarthen and County Club. His recreations were fishing and shooting.

In 1921, Stephens gave the town of Kidwelly land for a public park.

Alfred Stephens died on 28 November 1938, aged 67, at Broomhill, Kidwelly. An obituary described him as "a leading South Wales industrialist". His widow continued to live at Broomhill, then moved to the Victoria Hotel, Sidmouth, where she died in May 1941, aged 65.
