= Caerfyrddin (constituency) =

UK Parliament constituency (1918–1997, 2024 onwards)

Caerfyrddin (Carmarthen)
- County constituency for the House of Commons
- Interactive map of boundaries from 2024
- Boundary of Caerfyrddin in Wales
- Preserved county: Dyfed
- Electorate: 72,683 (March 2020)
- Major settlements: Carmarthen, Ammanford, Llandeilo

Current constituency
- Created: 2024
- Member of Parliament: Ann Davies (Plaid Cymru)
- Seats: One
- Created from: Carmarthen East & Dinefwr and Carmarthen West & South Pembrokeshire

1918–1997
- Seats: One
- Type of constituency: County constituency
- Created from: West Carmarthenshire, East Carmarthenshire and Carmarthen Boroughs
- Replaced by: Carmarthen East & Dinefwr and Carmarthen West & South Pembrokeshire

Overlaps
- Senedd: Sir Gaerfyrddin

Caerfyrddin (Welsh: [kaːɨrˈvərðɪn]), also known as Carmarthen (English: /kərˈmɑːrðən/ kər-MAR-dhən), is a constituency of the House of Commons in the UK Parliament, first contested at the 2024 general election, following the 2023 review of Westminster constituencies. It is currently represented by Ann Davies of Plaid Cymru.

In the Parliamentary Constituencies Order 2023, the name is given as Caerfyrddin (Carmarthen). Of the twenty-five Welsh constituencies with names in both English and Welsh, Caerfyrddin is the only one where the Welsh name comes first followed by the English name in brackets (in each of the other cases, the opposite is true). Caerfyrddin is the form used by the UK Parliament.

A similar constituency existed between 1918 and 1997 under the name Carmarthen.

== Boundaries ==
Under the 2023 review, the constituency was defined as being composed of the following wards of the County of Carmarthenshire, as they existed on 1 December 2020:

- Abergwili; Ammanford; Betws; Carmarthen Town North; Carmarthen Town South; Carmarthen Town West; Cenarth; Cilycwm; Cynwyl Elfed; Cynwyl Gaeo; Garnant; Glanamman; Laugharne Township; Llanboidy; Llanddarog; Llandeilo; Llandovery; Llandybie; Llanegwad; Llanfihangel Aberbythych; Llanfihangel-ar-Arth; Llangadog; Llangeler; Llangunnor; Llansteffan; Llanybydder; Manordeilo and Salem; Penygroes; Pontamman; Quarter Bach; St. Clears; Saron; Trelech; and Whitland.

Following a local government boundary review which came into effect in May 2022, the constituency now comprises the following wards of the County of Carmarthenshire from the 2024 general election:

- Abergwili; Ammanford; Betws; Carmarthen Town North and South; Carmarthen Town West; Cenarth and Llangeler; Cilycwm; Cwarter Bach; Cynwyl Elfed; Garnant; Glanamman; Laugharne Township; Llanboidy; Llanddarog; Llandeilo; Llandovery; Llandybie; Llanegwad; Llanfihangel Aberbythych; Llanfihangel-ar-Arth; Llangadog; Llangunnor; Llanybydder; Manordeilo and Salem; Penygroes; Saron; St. Clears and Llansteffan; Trelech; and Whitland.

== History ==
The Parliamentary Borough of Carmarthen (made up of Carmarthen town and Llanelli) existed from 1542 to 1832 alongside the Parliamentary County of Carmarthenshire, each returning one member. Under the Great Reform Act of 1832, the Borough was expanded to include both Carmarthen town and Llanelli (known as the Carmarthen Boroughs), and the representation of the county was increased to two members. In 1885, Carmarthenshire was split into the two county constituencies of East Carmarthenshire and West Carmarthenshire with one member each.

In 1918, the borough constituency was abolished (as well as East and West Carmarthenshire), but the name Carmarthen was transferred to one of the divisions of the county of Carmarthenshire. The new constituency was made up of the whole of the county of Carmarthenshire except for the new Llanelli constituency (the urban area around Llanelli). Notable towns were Carmarthen itself, Ammanford and Llandeilo.

In 1997, the Boundary Commission for Wales recommended an extra seat for Dyfed. This led to the seat being split two to one between Carmarthen East & Dinefwr and Carmarthen West & South Pembrokeshire.

The constituency was re-established as Caerfyrddin as part of the 2023 review of Westminster constituencies and under the June 2023 final proposals of the Boundary Commission for Wales for the 2024 United Kingdom general election.

=== Political history ===
Because the seat contained mining areas in the valley of the River Gwendraeth (until the 1980s), much countryside and a high proportion of Welsh speakers, it was fertile territory for the Labour Party, the Conservatives and Plaid Cymru alike. Although the Conservatives never won the seat, they came within 1200 votes of doing so in 1983.

Carmarthen is notable as the first constituency to elect a Plaid Cymru MP, Gwynfor Evans, at a 1966 by-election. Evans was later involved in one of the closest general election results ever in February 1974, when he lost to the Labour candidate by only three votes. The constituency also shot to fame in the following election in October 1974 as the only seat in the country to see its turnout rise on that of February 1974.

== Members of Parliament ==
=== 1918–1997: county constituency ===
Election	Member	Party
1918	John Hinds	Coalition Liberal
1922	John Hinds	National Liberal
Nov 1923	John Hinds	Liberal
Dec 1923	Sir Ellis Ellis-Griffith	Liberal
1924 by-election	Alfred Mond	Liberal
1926	Alfred Mond	Conservative
1928 by-election	William Nathaniel Jones	Liberal
1929	Daniel Hopkin	Labour
1931	Richard Thomas Evans	Liberal
1935	Daniel Hopkin	Labour
1941 by-election	Moelwyn Hughes	Labour
1945	Rhys Hopkin Morris	Liberal
1957 by-election	Lady Megan Lloyd George	Labour
1966 by-election	Gwynfor Evans	Plaid Cymru
1970	Gwynoro Jones	Labour
Oct. 1974	Gwynfor Evans	Plaid Cymru
1979	Roger Thomas	Labour
1987	Alan Williams	Labour
1997	constituency abolished: see Carmarthen East & Dinefwr and Carmarthen West & South Pembrokeshire	

=== MPs since 2024 ===
Carmarthen East and Dinefwr and Carmarthen West and South Pembrokeshire prior to 2024.

Election	Member	Party
2024	Ann Davies	Plaid Cymru

== Elections ==
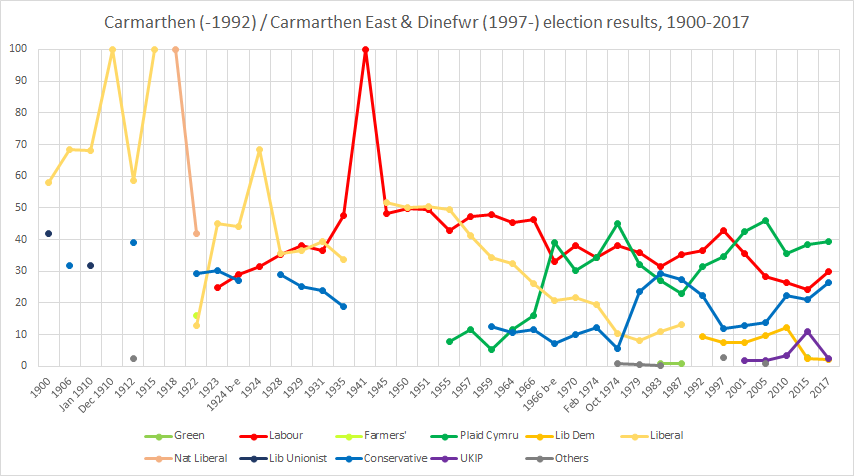
Carmarthen – Carmarthen East and Dinefwr election results

=== Elections in the 20th century ===
==== Elections in the 1910s ====
General election 1918: Carmarthen Boroughs
Party		Candidate	Votes	%
C	National Liberal	John Hinds	Unopposed	
Registered electors				
	National Liberal win (new seat)			
C indicates candidate endorsed by the coalition government.

==== Elections in the 1920s ====
Hinds

General election 1922: Carmarthen
Party	Candidate	Votes	%	±%
National Liberal	John Hinds	12,530	41.9	N/A
Unionist	George Coventry	8,805	29.4	N/A
National Farmers' Union	David Johns	4,775	15.9	N/A
Liberal	Hubert Llewelyn-Williams	3,847	12.8	N/A
Majority		3,725	12.5	N/A
Turnout		29,957	82.7	N/A
Registered electors		36,213		
National Liberal hold				

General election 1923: Carmarthen
Party	Candidate	Votes	%	±%
Liberal	Ellis Ellis-Griffith	12,988	45.1	+32.3
Unionist	Alfred Stephens	8,677	30.1	+0.7
Labour	Rowland Williams	7,132	24.8	N/A
Majority		4,311	15.0	N/A
Turnout		28,797	78.3	−4.4
Registered electors		36,779		
Liberal hold		Swing		

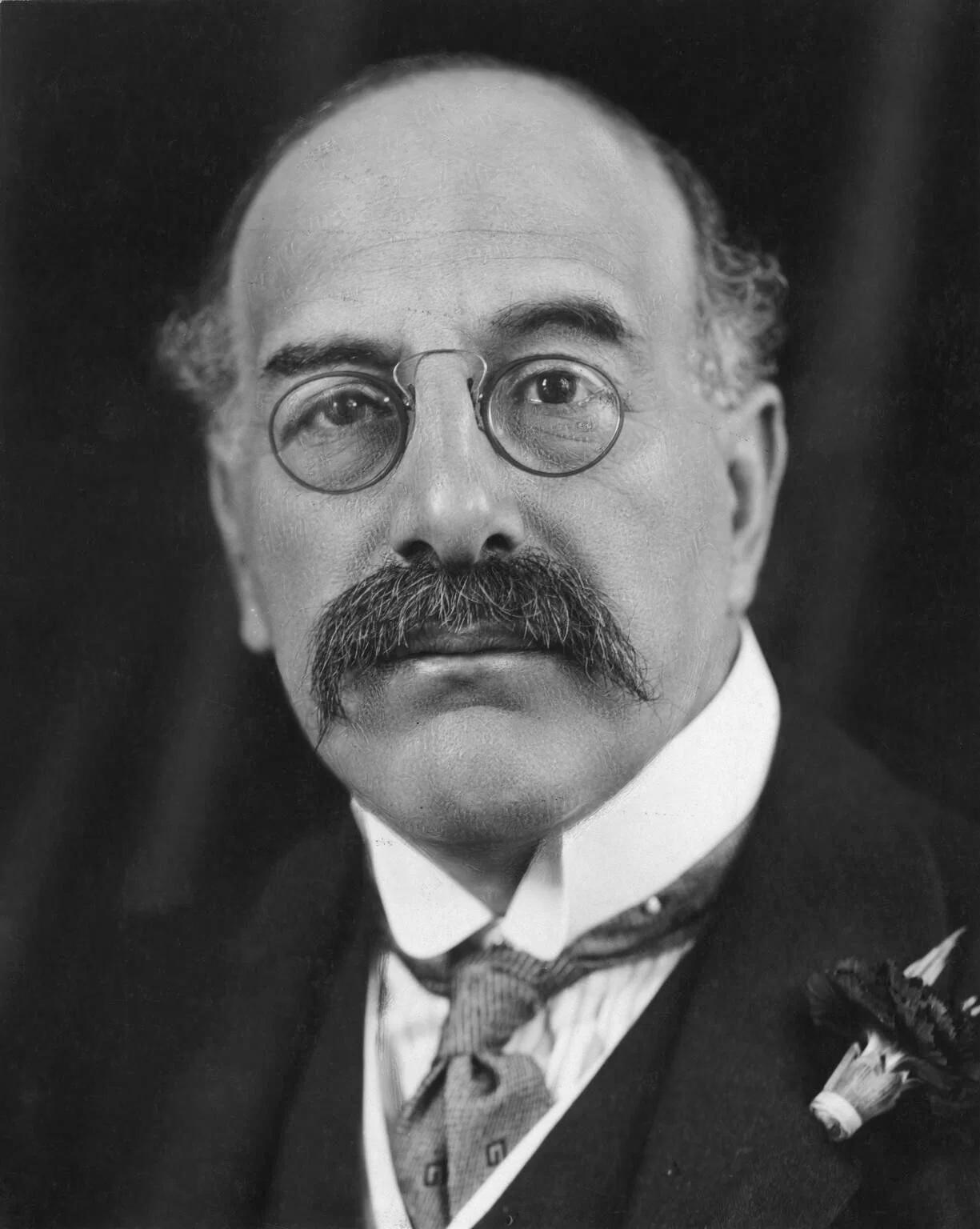
Sir Alfred Mond

1924 Carmarthen by-election
Party	Candidate	Votes	%	±%
Liberal	Alfred Mond	12,760	44.0	−1.1
Labour	Edward Teilo Owen	8,351	28.8	+4.0
Unionist	Alfred Stephens	7,896	27.2	−2.9
Majority		4,409	15.2	+0.2
Turnout		29,007	78.9	+0.6
Registered electors		36,779		
Liberal hold		Swing	−2.6	

General election 1924: Carmarthen
Party	Candidate	Votes	%	±%
Liberal	Alfred Mond	17,281	68.5	+23.4
Labour	Edward Teilo Owen	7,953	31.5	+6.7
Majority		9,328	37.0	+22.0
Turnout		25,234	67.9	−10.4
Registered electors		37,155		
Liberal hold		Swing	+8.4	

1928 Carmarthen by-election
Party	Candidate	Votes	%	±%
Liberal	William Nathaniel Jones	10,201	35.5	−33.0
Labour	Daniel Hopkin	10,154	35.4	+3.9
Unionist	Courtenay Mansel	8,361	29.1	N/A
Majority		47	0.1	−36.9
Turnout		28,716	76.6	+8.7
Registered electors		37,482		
Liberal hold		Swing	−18.5	

General election 1929: Carmarthen
Party	Candidate	Votes	%	±%
Labour	Daniel Hopkin	15,130	38.2	+6.7
Liberal	William Nathaniel Jones	14,477	36.6	−31.9
Unionist	John Coventry	9,961	25.2	N/A
Majority		653	1.6	N/A
Turnout		39,568	85.8	+17.9
Registered electors		46,110		
Labour gain from Liberal		Swing	+19.3	

==== Elections in the 1930s ====
General election 1931: Carmarthen
Party	Candidate	Votes	%	±%
Liberal	Richard Evans	15,532	39.5	+2.9
Labour	Daniel Hopkin	14,318	36.5	−1.7
Conservative	Delme William Campbell Davies-Evans	9,434	24.0	−1.2
Majority		1,214	3.0	N/A
Turnout		39,284	84.5	−1.3
Registered electors		46,507		
Liberal gain from Labour		Swing		

General election 1935: Carmarthen
Party	Candidate	Votes	%	±%
Labour	Daniel Hopkin	18,146	47.5	+11.0
Liberal	Richard Evans	12,911	33.8	−5.7
Conservative	Edward Kellett	7,177	18.8	−5.2
Majority		5,235	13.7	N/A
Turnout		38,234	79.3	−5.2
Registered electors		48,217		
Labour gain from Liberal		Swing		

==== Elections in the 1940s ====
1941 Carmarthen by-election
Party	Candidate	Votes	%	±%
Labour	Moelwyn Hughes	Unopposed		
Registered electors				
Labour hold				

General election 1945: Carmarthen
Party	Candidate	Votes	%	±%
Liberal	Rhys Hopkin Morris	19,783	51.7	+17.9
Labour	Moelwyn Hughes	18,504	48.3	+0.8
Majority		1,279	3.4	N/A
Turnout		38,286	76.1	−3.2
Registered electors		50,462		
Liberal gain from Labour		Swing		

==== Elections in the 1950s ====
General election 1950: Carmarthen:
Party	Candidate	Votes	%	±%
Liberal	Rhys Hopkin Morris	24,472	50.2	−1.5
Labour	Lynn Ungoed-Thomas	24,285	49.8	+1.5
Majority		187	0.4	−3.0
Turnout		48,759	83.4	+7.3
Registered electors		58,444		
Liberal hold		Swing		

General election 1951: Carmarthen
Party	Candidate	Votes	%	±%
Liberal	Rhys Hopkin Morris	25,632	50.5	+0.3
Labour	David Owen	25,165	49.5	−0.3
Majority		467	1.0	+0.6
Turnout		5,0795	86.5	+3.1
Registered electors		58,709		
Liberal hold		Swing		

General election 1955: Carmarthen
Party	Candidate	Votes	%	±%
Liberal	Rhys Hopkin Morris	24,410	49.5	−1.0
Labour	Jack Evans	21,077	42.7	−6.8
Plaid Cymru	Jennie Eirian Davies	3,835	7.8	N/A
Majority		3,333	6.8	+5.8
Turnout		49,320	85.1	−1.4
Registered electors		57,956		
Liberal hold		Swing		

1957 Carmarthen by-election
Party	Candidate	Votes	%	±%
Labour	Megan Lloyd George	23,679	47.3	+4.6
Liberal	John Morgan Davies	20,610	41.2	−8.3
Plaid Cymru	Jennie Eirian Davies	5,741	11.5	+3.7
Majority		3,069	6.1	N/A
Turnout		50,030	87.5	+2.4
Registered electors		57,183		
Labour gain from Liberal		Swing	+6.5	

General election 1959: Carmarthen
Party	Candidate	Votes	%	±%
Labour	Megan Lloyd George	23,399	47.9	+5.2
Liberal	Alun Talfan Davies	16,766	34.3	−15.2
Conservative	JB Evans	6,147	12.6	N/A
Plaid Cymru	Hywel Heulyn Roberts	2,545	5.2	−2.6
Majority		6,633	13.6	+6.8
Turnout		48,855	85.4	+0.3
Registered electors		62,235		
Labour hold		Swing		

==== Elections in the 1960s ====
General election 1964: Carmarthen
Party	Candidate	Votes	%	±%
Labour	Megan Lloyd George	21,424	45.5	−2.4
Liberal	Alun Talfan Davies	15,210	32.3	−2.0
Plaid Cymru	Gwynfor Evans	5,495	11.7	+6.5
Conservative	H.E. Protheroe-Beynon	4,996	10.6	−2.0
Majority		6,214	13.3	−0.3
Turnout		47,122	84.4	−1.0
Registered electors		55,786		
Labour hold		Swing		

General election 1966: Carmarthen
Party	Candidate	Votes	%	±%
Labour	Megan Lloyd George	21,221	46.2	+0.7
Liberal	D Hywel Davies	11,988	26.1	−6.2
Plaid Cymru	Gwynfor Evans	7,416	16.1	+4.4
Conservative	Simon James Day	5,338	11.6	+1.0
Majority		9,233	20.1	+6.9
Turnout		45,960	82.6	−1.8
Registered electors		55,407		
Labour hold		Swing		

1966 Carmarthen by-election
Party	Candidate	Votes	%	±%
Plaid Cymru	Gwynfor Evans	16,179	39.0	+22.9
Labour	Gwilym Prys-Davies	13,743	33.1	−13.1
Liberal	D Hywel Davies	8,650	20.8	−5.3
Conservative	Simon James Day	2,934	7.2	−4.6
Majority		2,436	5.9	N/A
Turnout		41,506	74.9	−7.7
Registered electors		55,407		
Plaid Cymru gain from Labour		Swing	+12.0	

==== Elections in the 1970s ====
General election 1970: Carmarthen
Party	Candidate	Votes	%	±%
Labour	Gwynoro Jones	18,719	38.0	−8.2
Plaid Cymru	Gwynfor Evans	14,812	30.1	+14.0
Liberal	Huw Thomas	10,707	21.7	−4.4
Conservative	Lloyd Harvard Davies	4,975	10.1	−1.5
Majority		3,907	7.9	N/A
Turnout		49,214	83.5	+1.0
Registered electors		64,616		
Labour gain from Plaid Cymru		Swing		

General election February 1974: Carmarthen
Party	Candidate	Votes	%	±%
Labour	Gwynoro Jones	17,165	34.3	−3.7
Plaid Cymru	Gwynfor Evans	17,162	34.3	+4.2
Liberal	David Roderick Owen-Jones	9,698	19.4	−2.3
Conservative	Bill Newton Dunn	6,037	12.1	+2.0
Majority		3	0.01	−7.9
Turnout		50,062	83.5	0.0
Registered electors		59,963		
Labour hold		Swing		

General election October 1974: Carmarthen
Party	Candidate	Votes	%	±%
Plaid Cymru	Gwynfor Evans	23,325	45.1	+11.8
Labour	Gwynoro Jones	19,685	38.1	+3.8
Liberal	David Roderick Owen-Jones	5,393	10.4	−9.0
Conservative	Robert Hayward	2,962	5.7	−6.4
British Candidate	Edward .B Jones	342	0.7	N/A
Majority		3,640	7.0	N/A
Turnout		51,704	85.6	+2.1
Registered electors		60,402		
Plaid Cymru gain from Labour		Swing		

General election 1979: Carmarthen
Party	Candidate	Votes	%	±%
Labour	Roger Thomas	18,667	35.9	−2.2
Plaid Cymru	Gwynfor Evans	16,689	32.0	−13.1
Conservative	Nigel M. Thomas	12,272	23.6	+17.9
Liberal	Clem Thomas	4,186	8.0	−2.4
National Front	Charlie Grice	149	0.3	N/A
New Britain	EJ Clarke	126	0.2	N/A
Majority		1,978	3.9	N/A
Turnout		52,086	84.4	−1.2
Registered electors		61,714		
Labour gain from Plaid Cymru		Swing		

==== Elections in the 1980s ====
General election 1983: Carmarthen
Party	Candidate	Votes	%	±%
Labour	Roger Thomas	16,459	31.6	−4.3
Conservative	Nigel M. Thomas	15,305	29.4	+5.8
Plaid Cymru	Gwynfor Evans	14,099	27.1	−4.9
Liberal (SDP)	Joan Colin	5,737	11.0	+3.0
Ecology	Brian Kingzett	374	0.7	N/A
BNP	Charlie Grice	154	0.3	N/A
Majority		1,154	2.2	−1.7
Turnout		52,126	82.1	−1.3
Registered electors		63,468		
Labour hold		Swing		

General election 1987: Carmarthen
Party	Candidate	Votes	%	±%
Labour	Alan Williams	19,128	35.4	+3.8
Conservative	Rod Richards	14,811	27.4	−2.0
Plaid Cymru	Hywel Teifi Edwards	12,457	23.0	−4.1
SDP (Liberal)	Gwynoro Jones	7,203	13.3	+2.3
Green	Graham Oubridge	481	0.9	+0.2
Majority		4,317	8.0	+5.8
Turnout		54,080	82.9	+0.8
Registered electors		65,252		
Labour hold		Swing		

==== Elections in the 1990s ====
General election 1992: Carmarthen
Party	Candidate	Votes	%	±%
Labour	Alan Williams	20,879	36.6	+1.2
Plaid Cymru	Rhodri Glyn Thomas	17,957	31.5	+8.5
Conservative	Stephen Cavenagh	12,782	22.4	−5.0
Liberal Democrats	Juliana Hughes	5,353	9.4	−3.9
Majority		2,922	5.1	−2.9
Turnout		56,971	82.7	−0.2
Registered electors		68,887		
Labour hold		Swing	−3.6	

=== Elections in the 21st century ===
==== Elections in the 2010s ====
2019 notional result (Note: Estimate of the 2019 general election result as if the revised boundaries recommended under the 2023 boundary review were in place)
Party	Vote	%
Conservative	20,891	39.2
Plaid Cymru	16,362	30.7
Labour	13,380	25.1
Brexit Party	2,023	3.8
Liberal Democrats	686	1.3
Majority	4,529	8.5
Turnout	53,342	73.4
Electorate	72,683	

==== Elections in the 2020s ====
General election 2024: Caerfyrddin
Party	Candidate	Votes	%	±%
Plaid Cymru	Ann Davies	15,520	34.0	+3.3
Labour	Martha O'Neil	10,985	24.1	−1.0
Conservative	Simon Hart	8,825	19.4	−19.8
Reform	Bernard Holton	6,944	15.2	+11.4
Liberal Democrats	Nick Beckett	1,461	3.2	+1.9
Green	Will Beasley	1,371	3.0	N/A
Women's Equality	Nancy Cole	282	0.6	N/A
Workers Party	David Mark Evans	216	0.5	N/A
Majority		4,535	9.9	N/A
Turnout		45,604	61.6	−11.8
Registered electors		74,003		
Plaid Cymru gain from Conservative		Swing	+2.2	
