= Moelwyn Hughes =

British politician (1897–1955)

Moelwyn Hughes KC

Member of Parliament for Islington North
- In office 23 February 1950 – 5 October 1951
- Preceded by: Leslie Haden-Guest
- Succeeded by: Wilfred Fienburgh

Member of Parliament for Carmarthen
- In office 26 March 1941 – 15 June 1945
- Preceded by: Daniel Hopkin
- Succeeded by: Rhys Hopkin Morris

Personal details
- Born: Goronwy Moelwyn Hughes; 6 October 1897 Cardigan, Wales
- Died: 1 November 1955 (aged 58)
- Party: Liberal (before 1935); Labour (1935–55)
- Spouse: Louise Mary Greer
- Children: 3
- Parent(s): John Gruffyd Moelwyn Hughes; Anna Maria (Mya) Lewis
- Education: University of Cambridge
- Nickname: Ronw

Goronwy "Ronw" Moelwyn Hughes, KC (6 October 1897 – 1 November 1955), known as Moelwyn Hughes was a Welsh lawyer and a Liberal and Labour politician who was elected to two short terms as a Member of Parliament (MP).

== Early life ==
Born in Cardigan, Wales, Hughes was the son of J. G. Moelwyn Hughes (1866–1944) and his wife Mya (née Lewis). He had one sister and four brothers, including Emyr Alun Moelwyn-Hughes (1905–78), a distinguished physical chemist and academic author in the department of physical chemistry at Cambridge University. Rev Hughes was a Presbyterian minister who became Moderator of the General Assembly in 1936, and was a lyric poet, hymn writer, and philosopher. A pacifist and Liberal party supporter, he followed his son's later switch in political allegiance to Labour.

The younger Hughes was educated at council and county schools in Cardigan, at the University College of Wales, Aberystwyth, and at Downing College, Cambridge, where he gained a First-Class Honours degree in Law. His family moved to Birkenhead in 1917, and Hughes was elected there as a local councillor. In 1922 he entered the bar on the Northern Circuit, and was later appointed as a Lecturer in International Law at the London School of Economics. He was made a K.C. in 1943.

== Political career ==
At the 1929 general election, he stood as a Liberal candidate in the safe Labour Party-held constituency of Rhondda West, losing heavily to the sitting Labour MP William John. In October 1930 he was chosen as Liberal candidate for the more winnable Southport seat but at the 1931 general election, he was well beaten by the Conservative candidate. Soon after Hughes joined the Labour Party, and stood unsuccessfully as the Labour candidate in the Cardiganshire constituency at the 1935 general election.

He was elected to the House of Commons at an unopposed by-election in 1941, as Member of Parliament for Carmarthen, following the resignation of Labour MP Major Daniel Hopkin MC. However, at the 1945 general election, he lost the seat by 1,279 votes to the Liberal candidate Rhys Hopkin Morris.

Hughes returned to Parliament at the 1950 general election, when he was elected as (MP) for the safe Labour seat of Islington North, in North London. He represented the constituency for only one year, until he stepped down at the 1951 general election. A block of flats in Hilldrop Crescent, Holloway, in Islington North, is named Moelwyn Hughes Court.

== Moelwyn Hughes Report ==
In March 1946 33 people were killed and hundreds injured at the Burnden Park grounds of Bolton Wanderers football club, who were playing Stoke City in an FA Cup match. Hughes was appointed to lead the official inquiry into the disaster, and his report recommended limitations on crowd sizes. An estimated 85,000 fans were present in a stadium with capacity for only 60,000.

== Private life ==
Ronw's wife Louise Mary, eldest daughter of the judge Arthur Greer, 1st Baron Fairfield, survived him on his death in 1955 at the age of 58. They had two sons and one daughter.

== Notes ==
Parliament of the United Kingdom
Preceded by Daniel Hopkin	Member of Parliament for Carmarthen; 1941–1945	Succeeded by Rhys Hopkin Morris
Preceded by Leslie Haden-Guest	Member of Parliament for Islington North; 1950–1951	Succeeded by Wilfred Fienburgh
Professional and academic associations
Preceded by Humphrey D. Roberts	President of the Aberystwyth Old Students' Association; 1948–49	Succeeded by Dr E. Davies-Thomas
