= Richard Thomas Evans =

British politician (1890–1946)

Richard Thomas Evans (18 November 1890 – 20 July 1946) was a British Liberal Party politician.

== Before Parliament ==
Evans was educated at the University of Wales. During the First World War he served in the 11th (2nd Gwent) Battalion, South Wales Borderers and attained the rank of captain. In 1918 he married Edith Rhys Williams. In 1923 he published the book Aspects of the Study of Society, in the series Library of Philosophy and Religion. He was for a time a lecturer in economics at University College, Cardiff.

== Parliamentary candidate ==
Evans had fought the Carmarthenshire seat of Llanelly in the general elections of 1923, 1924 and 1929 but was on all three occasions unsuccessful, albeit having campaigned with energy and ability against a complacent Labour party. At the 1929 general election, Evans had hopes of a straight fight with Labour in Llanelly when the local Conservatives voted not to put up a candidate. However their decision was overturned by Conservative Central Office who sent down Mr. J P L Thomas of Llandilo in Carmarthenshire to stand in the election.

== Industrial expert ==
In the run-up to the 1929 general election, Evans had been involved in drafting the Liberal Party industrial policy. Evans was certainly close to David Lloyd George who was the source of inspiration for many innovative policy initiatives in the late 1920s. In 1925 the Liberal Industrial Inquiry was set up bringing together many well-known politicians and economists including Maynard Keynes, Ramsay Muir and Herbert Samuel as well as Lloyd George himself. This led to the publication in 1928 of Britain’s Industrial Future, also known as the Liberal Yellow Book.

== MP for Carmarthen ==
Evans entered Parliament at the 1931 general election as MP for Carmarthen, taking the seat from Labour. As the 1931 general election approached and the debate over the National Government raged, Evans was on the side of official Liberal group in Parliament led by Sir Herbert Samuel but he promised to support the National government of Prime Minister Ramsay MacDonald on the basis of Macdonald’s published manifesto and, despite the pledge of the Unionist candidate to do the same with the prospect of the splitting of the National vote, this was enough to gain him the seat in a three-cornered contest, although with hardly a safe majority of 1,214. Once elected Evans, although he called himself a free-trader, did initially support the government, voting for a Bill to authorise duties on abnormal imports, despite some declared misgivings. However, in spite of this profession of loyalty to Macdonald, Evans soon crossed the floor to sit with the official Liberal group who were in opposition. Nevertheless, his flirtation with the National Government had soured his relationship with Lloyd George. By 1934 Evans must have been having thoughts about the approaching general election because, according to the diary of Frances Stevenson he wrote to Lloyd George’s principal private secretary, A J Sylvester, asking about a rumour he had heard that Lloyd George had told Daniel Hopkin, the former Labour MP for Carmarthen, that he would publicly support him at the next election and possibly even go down to Carmarthen to speak for him. Stevenson also records that Lloyd George thought Evans a man of limited gifts, with some oratorical skills but with only one good speech which he adapted to suit his audience. The speech apparently went down well in Wales but was coldly received in the House of Commons.

Evans’s drifting between support of and opposition to the National Government did not endear him to the Conservatives either and they decided to oppose him at the next general election in 1935. Evans’s trying to ride two horses at once on the question of his support for the National Government extended into the election campaign itself. Once the Conservative candidate had put himself in the field, Evans put out a statement, undertaking to support Stanley Baldwin’s administration. Had he done so earlier he might have attracted more National support but in the end Evans, who described himself on the ballot paper as a plain Liberal (rather than a Liberal National), lost by 1,942 votes to Labour candidate Daniel Hopkin, the man he had defeated in 1931.

== Would-be biographer ==
In 1933, Evans’s relationship with Lloyd George had not yet descended into ruin. He approached Lloyd George with a proposal that he should write a biography of the former prime minister in Welsh and they had dinner together at the House of Commons to discuss it. But according to Lloyd George’s principal private secretary, A J Sylvester, Lloyd George discouraged Evans from this project and certainly the book was never published. But in the course of their conversation Evans managed to extract from Lloyd George an admission of regret that he had not done more to stop the Passchendaele offensive of 1917 which resulted in tremendous loss of Allied life. Lloyd George said he failed to act to stop the battle because he did not wish to be accused of interfering as prime minister directly with the military decisions of his soldiers, particularly General Jan Smuts who was in favour of the operation.

Parliament of the United Kingdom
Preceded by Daniel Hopkin	Member of Parliament for Carmarthen; 1931 – 1935	Succeeded by Daniel Hopkin
