= Gwynfor Evans =

Welsh politician (1912–2005)

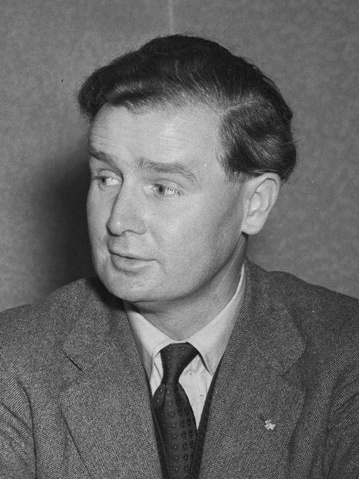
- Evans in 1951

President of Plaid Cymru
- In office 1945–1981
- Preceded by: Abi Williams
- Succeeded by: Dafydd Wigley

Member of Parliament for Carmarthen
- In office 15 July 1966 – 29 May 1970
- Preceded by: Megan Lloyd George
- Succeeded by: Gwynoro Jones
- In office 10 October 1974 – 7 April 1979
- Preceded by: Gwynoro Jones
- Succeeded by: Roger Thomas

Personal details
- Born: Gwynfor Richard Evans; 1 September 1912 Barry, Wales
- Died: 21 April 2005 (aged 92) Pencarreg, Carmarthenshire, Wales
- Party: Plaid Cymru
- Spouse: Rhiannon Prys Thomas (m. 1941)
- Children: 7
- Relatives: Mabon ap Gwynfor (grandson)
- Education: University of Wales, Aberystwyth; St John's College, Oxford

Gwynfor Richard Evans (1 September 1912 – 21 April 2005) was a Welsh politician, lawyer and author. He was President of the Welsh political party Plaid Cymru for thirty-six years and was the first member of Parliament to represent it at Westminster, which he did twice, from 1966 to 1970, and again from 1974 to 1979.

On entering the House of Commons, he famously failed in his attempt to obtain permission to take the oath in the Welsh language. He was the first MP to attempt to do so, but the right to take the oath in any of the UK's non-English native languages was not granted until 1974. His most notable achievement was his successful campaign for the creation of a Welsh-language television channel.

== Early life ==
Gwynfor Evans was born in Barry, near Cardiff, to Dan Evans and Catherine Richard. He had a brother named Alcwyn, and a sister named Ceridwen. His father ran a chain of shops in Barry, and his mother a china shop. His mother was a fluent Welsh speaker. As a boy, he was educated at Gladstone Road School. Later on, he was educated at Barry County School, where he was captain of the school's cricket and hockey teams. The area was mostly English-speaking; at school, he began learning the Welsh language but did not become fully fluent until the age of seventeen.

Evans studied at the University of Wales, Aberystwyth, and at St John's College, Oxford, from where he qualified as a lawyer. During his time at St John's, he became a member of the Dafydd ap Gwilym society there. He was also a market gardener. He was a teenager when the Welsh nationalist party Plaid Cymru was founded in 1925, and he founded a branch of the party while he was at Oxford. He became the party's president in 1945 and retained the office until 1981.

A pacifist, he became active in Heddychwyr Cymru, a Welsh organisation closely associated with the Peace Pledge Union, serving as secretary and editor of a series of pamphlets throughout the Second World War. A committed Christian also, he declared himself a conscientious objector and was required to appear before a tribunal which, recognising the firmness of his beliefs, registered him unconditionally.

Evans is credited with keeping Plaid Cymru going through the lean years of the 1940s and 1950s. In the 1950s, he campaigned unsuccessfully for a Welsh parliament. He joined locals Dafydd Roberts and Elizabeth May Watkin Jones in their protest against the closure and flooding of their village Capel Celyn. This was because of the plan to dam the Tryweryn River to supply the city of Liverpool with water. This was a cause célèbre in Wales in the early 1960s.

In 1962, Evans joined Wales West and North Television, in which he was one of the leading figures in the venture. It won the ITV franchise for western and northern Wales, but the venture failed because of financial difficulties, and the company was merged with another station, Television Wales and the West.

== Electoral record ==
=== Local government and first parliamentary contests ===
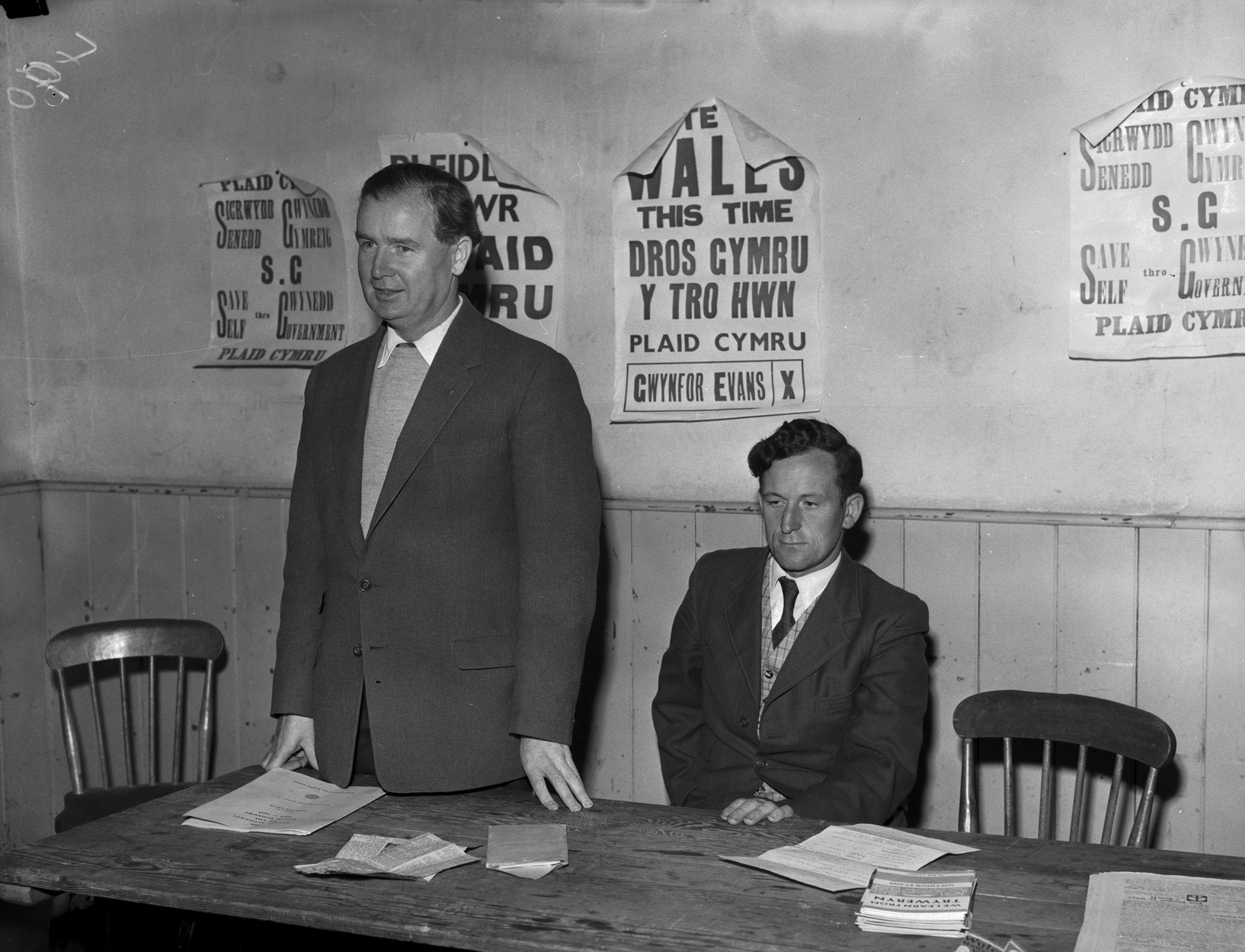
Evans speaking in Merioneth, during the 1959 UK Election

Evans was elected to Carmarthenshire County Council in 1949, keeping his seat for the next 25 years, usually as the lone Plaid Cymru representative, acquiring the nickname "Evans dual carriageway" for his emphasis on improving transport links. In 1973, following the abolition of Carmarthenshire County Council, Evans failed to be elected to the new Dyfed County Council. Evans contested Merioneth at the general elections of 1945, 1950, 1955 and 1959, and the 1954 Aberdare by-election.

=== 1966 Carmarthen by-election ===
In 1964 Evans transferred his candidature to Carmarthen. On 14 July 1966, Evans won the parliamentary seat of Carmarthen from Labour in a by-election caused by the death of Lady Megan Lloyd George, daughter of the former Liberal prime minister, David Lloyd George, having come third in the general election just a few weeks before. He had also contested the seat at the 1964 general election. His by-election victory is regarded as a seminal moment for Plaid Cymru. He was shown around the House of Commons by fellow pacifist Emrys Hughes, the son-in-law of Keir Hardie; on pointing out the Welsh Labour table in the Commons' tea room, Hughes warned him, "You'd better not sit down there, your name's mud among that lot."

On entering the House of Commons, he famously failed in his attempt to obtain permission to take the oath in the Welsh language. He was the first MP to attempt to do so, but the right to take the oath in any of the UK's non-English native languages was not granted until 1974.

=== Later electoral record ===
In the 1970 general election Evans lost his Carmarthen seat to Labour's Gwynoro Jones and failed to regain it in the February 1974 general election by only three votes. He regained the seat, with a majority of 3,640 votes, in the October 1974 general election, when he returned to Parliament accompanied by two other Plaid Cymru MPs, Dafydd Wigley and Dafydd Elis Thomas.

Evans lost Carmarthen once more at the 1979 general election, to Roger Thomas (also Labour). He was unsuccessful in the 1983 general election, and did not contest any further elections.

== Career as an MP ==
In the House of Commons, Evans was true to his pacifist principles in being one of the few MPs to oppose the British government's support of the Nigerian federal government with supplies of weapons in the civil war against Biafra (1967–1970). He also opposed the Vietnam War: after being denied entry to the country as part of an inspection group, he instead protested outside a US air base in Thailand.

Evans was the first (and last) president of the Celtic League 1961–71. Robert McIntyre of the SNP was vice-president at the time.

== Later life ==
His most notable achievement was his successful campaign for the creation of a Welsh-language television channel. In 1980 his threat to go on hunger strike, after the Conservative government reneged on its election promise of a Welsh language television channel, was instrumental in bringing about an early U-turn on the part of Margaret Thatcher, and S4C began broadcasting on 1 November 1982.

In his political retirement he became a prolific writer, mainly on Welsh subjects and writing in Welsh with simultaneous or later English editions. His work Aros Mae (It Endures) (published 1971), a comprehensive history of Wales, and the English-language version Land of my Fathers: 2000 Years of Welsh History (published 1974), had already become best-sellers.

== Personal life ==
In 1941 Evans married Rhiannon Prys Thomas, who survived him by nine months, dying on 13 January 2006. They had seven children. Their daughter, Meinir, became a prominent Welsh-language activist and married Ffred Ffransis.

== Death ==
Evans died at his home in Pencarreg on 21 April 2005 at the age of 92.

=== Tributes ===
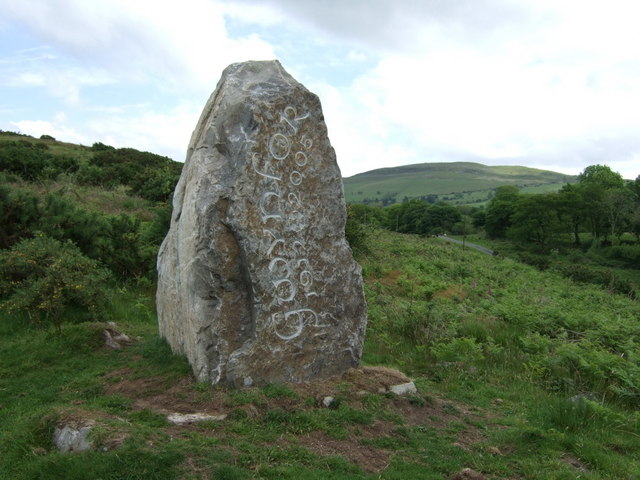
Gwynfor Evans memorial, on the approach to Garn Goch hillfort, near Llandeilo

On his death the Welsh political establishment united in paying its respects to Gwynfor Evans:

- "Without Gwynfor Evans at the helm Plaid Cymru may not have survived to see electoral success in later years. His influence was felt beyond the confines of party politics. Wales would not be the nation it is today — perhaps would not be counted as a nation at all — if not for Gwynfor Evans." — Dafydd Iwan, President of Plaid Cymru.
- "Although his relationships with Labour MPs were not always positive, there is no gainsaying his massive contribution to Welsh public life, and particularly in raising the profile of Wales and Welsh issues throughout his long career in Welsh and British politics." – Rhodri Morgan, First Minister of the Welsh Government (Labour).
- "Gwynfor Evans made a distinguished contribution to Welsh public life and will be remembered particularly for his advancement of the Welsh language." – Peter Hain, Secretary of State for Wales (Labour).
- "Wales has lost one of its most significant figures of modern times. Gwynfor Evans was a highly respected figure who made a major contribution to Welsh politics. His record on delivering Welsh language broadcasting for Wales is of particular importance." – Nick Bourne, Leader of the Welsh Conservative Party.
- "Gwynfor served his party well and was able to bring them into electoral success. He earned respect from across the political spectrum. His passing marks the end of a chapter in Welsh political history". – Mike German, Leader of the Welsh Liberal Democrats.
- A campaign was launched to build a permanent monument to Gwynfor Evans in Carmarthen.
- A campaign by local primary school teacher, Gwenno Hughes, to establish a permanent memorial to Evans, in the town of his birth, culminated in the unveiling of a bronze bust created by the sculptor John Meirion Morris at Barry Library in 2010. The cost of the memorial was raised by the staff of the local school Ysgol Gymraeg Sant Baruc.

== Bibliography ==
- Aros Mae (1971) (English version: Land of my Fathers: 2000 Years of Welsh History (1974) ISBN 0-903701-03-0)
- Byw neu farw? : y frwydr dros yr iaith a'r Sianel deledu gymraeg / Life or death? : the struggle for the language and a Welsh TV channel (1980 ISBN 0-905077-12-1, bilingual text)
- Diwedd Prydeindod (1981, ISBN 0-86243-018-6)
- Autobiography: Bywyd Cymro (1982) (English version: For the Sake of Wales (1986) ISBN 1-86057-021-6)
- The Fight for Welsh Freedom (2000, ISBN 0-86243-515-3)
- Cymru o Hud (2001, ISBN 0-86243-545-5) (English version: Eternal Wales (2001) ISBN 0-86243-608-7)

== See also ==
- Royal Commission on the Constitution (United Kingdom)

Parliament of the United Kingdom
Preceded by Megan Lloyd George	Member of Parliament for Carmarthen; 1966–1970	Succeeded by Gwynoro Jones
Preceded by Gwynoro Jones	Member of Parliament for Carmarthen; 1974–1979	Succeeded by Roger Thomas
Party political offices
Preceded by Abi Williams	President of Plaid Cymru; 1945–1981	Succeeded by Dafydd Wigley
New post	Honorary President of Plaid Cymru; 1982–2005	Succeeded by Dafydd Wigley
