= 1924 Carmarthen by-election =

UK Parliamentary by-election in Wales

The 1924 Carmarthen by-election was a parliamentary by-election for the British House of Commons constituency of Carmarthen in West Wales held on 14 August 1924.

== Vacancy ==
The by-election was caused by the resignation of the sitting Liberal MP, Sir Ellis Ellis-Griffith. Ellis-Griffith was 64 years old and had first been elected an MP in 1895. Soon after being elected for Carmarthen at the 1923 general election he made it known to his local party that he would not be standing again at the next election. He had been in public life a long time and was one Liberal who had not supported the decision of the party to allow the minority Labour government to take office in January 1924. According to one source, local Liberal opinion in July 1924 favoured an immediate appeal to the electorate and Ellis-Griffith resigned from Parliament using the traditional device of applying for the Chiltern Hundreds at the end of that month.

== Candidates ==
- The Liberals selected Alfred Mond. Mond was an industrialist and financier of Jewish descent who would later become most well known for being the man behind the formation of ICI. Mond was aged 56 at this time and had been Liberal MP for a number of other constituencies, most recently for Swansea West.
- The Conservatives chose Sir Alfred Stephens, a Welsh speaker and employer of labour in the constituency who had been their candidate at the last general election.
- Labour selected the Reverend E T Owen.

== Campaign ==
The main local issue in the by-election was the importance of agriculture, given the largely rural nature of the constituency. However an interesting question was how far would the fact that Sir Alfred Stephens and the Reverend Edward Owen were both Welsh speakers, whereas Mond was not, affect the attitude of the electors and how far, if at all, this matter would resonate with Welsh national feeling in the area. On the national issues, the main battleground was the fight between socialist and anti-socialist feeling. Mond took up the anti-socialist crusade with vigour and had Lloyd George come to Carmarthen to support him on this, against the background of the record and statements of the Labour government and Labour ministers.

== Result ==
The result was a hold for the Liberal Party with Mond obtaining a slightly increased majority of 4,409 votes, although their share of the poll was marginally reduced. This time it was Labour that secured second place, with Stephens coming third.

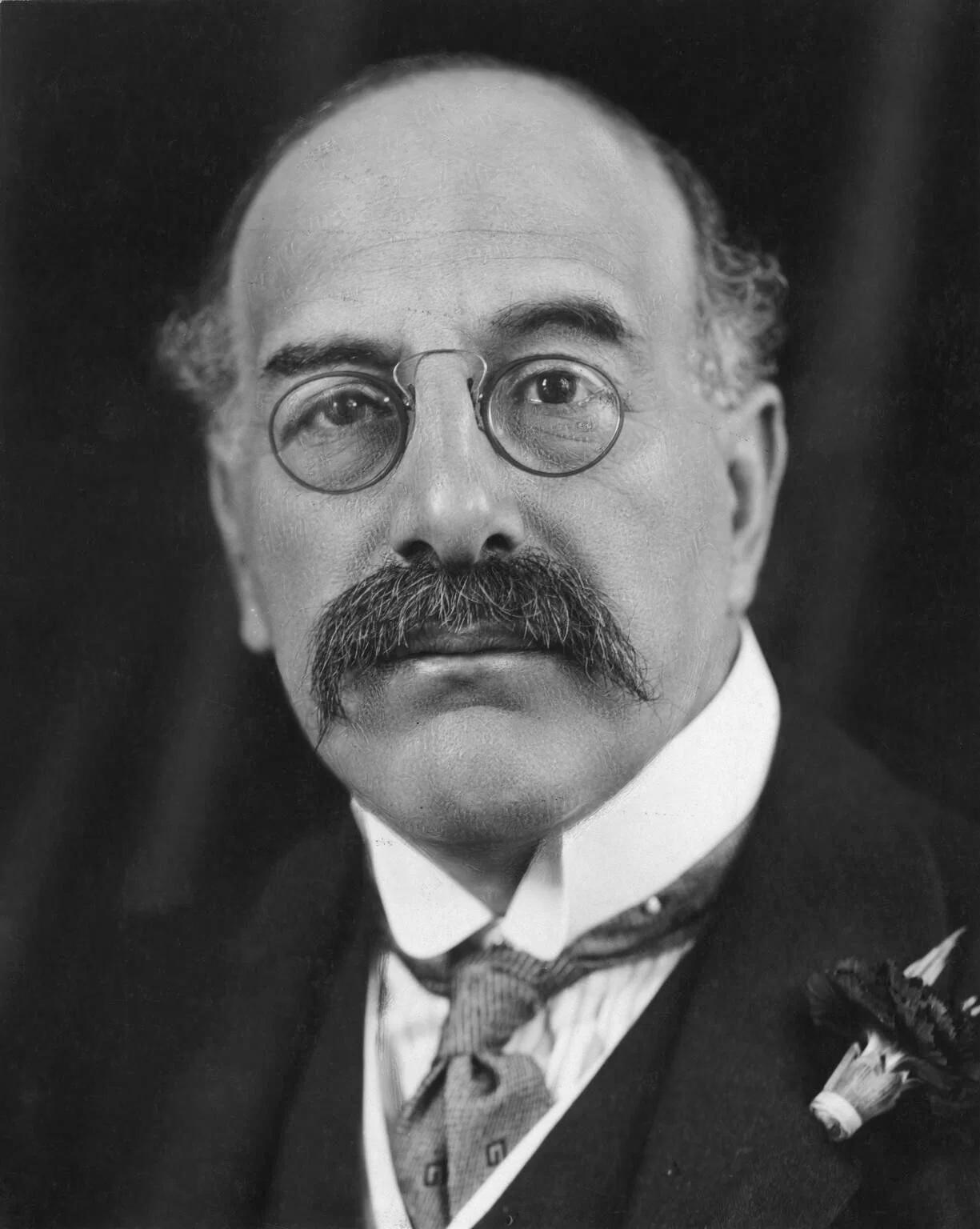
Alfred Mond

1924 Carmarthen by-election: Electorate
Party	Candidate	Votes	%	±%
Liberal	Alfred Mond	12 760	44.0	−1.1
Labour	Edward Teilo Owen	8,351	28.8	+4.0
Conservative	Sir Alfred Stephens	7,896	27.2	−2.9
Majority		4,409	15.2	+0.2
Turnout		29,007	78.9	+0.6
Registered electors		36,779		
Liberal hold		Swing	-2.6	

This must have been a disappointment to the Conservatives who were said to have fought the election hard. Labour could probably take the most comfort from the result, given the difficult time the minority Labour government was experiencing at Westminster.

== Aftermath ==
At the next general election Owen faced a straight fight with Mond, the Conservatives having ceded to Mond (later to defect to the Conservatives) the anti-socialist banner.

== See also ==
- Carmarthen by-election
- Lists of United Kingdom by-elections
- United Kingdom by-election records
