= 1919 Carmarthenshire County Council election =

Welsh local election

All 53 seats to Carmarthenshire County Council 27 seats needed for a majority
| | First party | Second party | Third party |
|---|---|---|---|
| Party | Liberal | Conservative | Labour |
| Seats won | 0/53 | 0/53 | 0/53 |
| | Fourth party | Fifth party |
| Party | Independent | Liberal Unionist |
| Seats won | 1/51 | 0/51 |
Council control after election
TBD

An election to the Carmarthenshire County Council was held in March 1919. It was preceded by the 1913 election and followed by the 1922 election.

== Overview of the result ==
The elections were less politicised than in the pre-war era, with more candidates being elected without any declared political affiliations. The non-political nature of the contests was emphasized by the traditionally Conservative Carmarthen Journal, which had long opposed the politicized nature of local authority elections. Other publications, however, included political affiliations in their coverage of the results.

== Boundary changes ==
There were no boundary changes.

== Unopposed returns ==
22 of the 53 divisions were uncontested, with the majority of the unopposed returns being in the rural parts of the county.

== Contested elections ==
A greater proportion of the sitting members were challenged than had been the case in most pre-war contests and a number of prominent members were defeated including Mervyn Peel, former Conservative candidate for East Carmarthenshire, at Llangadog. In Carmarthen, the Rev. Andrew Fuller Mills was defeated by an ex-serviceman.

In Llanelli, D.C. Parry, a Liberal member of the Council since its formation, was defeated by Gwendoline Trubshaw, who received the support of the Discharged and Demobilised Soldiers' and Sailors' Association.

Other contests in Llanelli town and in the surrounding areas saw significant support for the Labour party, which captured a number of seats, building on the strong result achieved by Dr J.H. Williams at the General Election the previous year.

In some cases there is an ambiguity in the sources over the party affiliations and this is explained below in relation to individual ward contests where relevant.

== Retiring aldermen ==
The aldermen who retired at the election were

== Division results ==
=== Abergwili ===
Abergwili 1919
| Party | Candidate | Votes | % | ±% |
|---|---|---|---|---|
| Liberal | John Griffiths* | 321 | | |
| Conservative | William Williams | 305 | | |
| Majority | | | | |
| Liberal hold | | Swing | | |

=== Ammanford ===
Ammanford 1919
| Party | Candidate | Votes | % | ±% |
|---|---|---|---|---|
| Progressive | John Griffiths | 969 | | |
| Labour | Thomas Evans | 432 | | |
| Majority | | | | |
| Liberal hold | | Swing | | |

=== Bettws ===
Bettws 1910
| Party | Candidate | Votes | % | ±% |
|---|---|---|---|---|
| Labour | Tom Morris* | unopposed | | |
| Liberal | Henry Folland | 285 | | |
| Liberal | Arthur Williams | 142 | | |
| Majority | | 218 | | |
| Labour hold | | Swing | | |

=== Caio ===
Caio 1919
| Party | Candidate | Votes | % | ±% |
|---|---|---|---|---|
| | M. Davies | 294 | | |
| | Isaac Williams | 255 | | |
| Majority | | | | |

=== Carmarthen Eastern Ward (Lower Division) ===
Carmarthen Eastern Ward (Lower Division) 1919
| Party | Candidate | Votes | % | ±% |
|---|---|---|---|---|
| Liberal | David Denzil Harries* | unopposed | | |
| Majority | | | | |
| Liberal hold | | Swing | | |

=== Carmarthen Eastern Ward (Upper Division) ===
Carmarthen Eastern Ward (Upper Division) 1919
| Party | Candidate | Votes | % | ±% |
|---|---|---|---|---|
| Ex-Soldier | Percy James Williams | 375 | | |
| Liberal | Andrew Fuller-Mills* | 341 | | |
| Majority | | | | |
| Ex-Soldier gain from Liberal | | | | |

=== Carmarthen Western Ward (Lower Division) ===
Carmarthen Western Ward (Lower Division) 1919
| Party | Candidate | Votes | % | ±% |
|---|---|---|---|---|
| Conservative | H.S. Holmes* | unopposed | | |
| Conservative hold | | Swing | | |

=== Carmarthen Western Ward (Upper Division) ===
Carmarthen Western Ward (Upper Division) 1919
| Party | Candidate | Votes | % | ±% |
|---|---|---|---|---|
| Liberal | John Lewis | unopposed | | |
| Liberal hold | | Swing | | |

=== Cenarth ===
Cenarth 1919
| Party | Candidate | Votes | % | ±% |
|---|---|---|---|---|
| Liberal | D.C. Lloyd | unopposed | | |
| Liberal hold | | Swing | | |

=== Cilycwm ===
Cilycwm 1919
| Party | Candidate | Votes | % | ±% |
|---|---|---|---|---|
| Conservative | Ivor Elystan Campbell-Davys | unopposed | | |
| Conservative hold | | Swing | | |

=== Conwil ===
Conwil 1919
| Party | Candidate | Votes | % | ±% |
|---|---|---|---|---|
| Liberal | Thomas Phillips* | unopposed | | |
| Liberal hold | | Swing | | |

=== Kidwelly ===
Kidwelly 1919
| Party | Candidate | Votes | % | ±% |
|---|---|---|---|---|
| Conservative | Alfred Stephens* | 574 | | |
| Labour | William Lewis Williams | 277 | | |
| Majority | | | | |
| Conservative hold | | Swing | | |

=== Laugharne ===
Laugharne 1919
| Party | Candidate | Votes | % | ±% |
|---|---|---|---|---|
| Liberal | T.S.K. Morse | | | |
| Majority | | 39 | | |
| Liberal gain from Conservative | | Swing | | |

=== Llanarthney ===
Llanarthney 1919
| Party | Candidate | Votes | % | ±% |
|---|---|---|---|---|
| Liberal | W. Jones Thomas* | unopposed | | |
| Liberal hold | | Swing | | |

=== Llanboidy ===
Llanboidy 1919
| Party | Candidate | Votes | % | ±% |
|---|---|---|---|---|
| Liberal | | unopposed | | |
| Liberal hold | | Swing | | |

=== Llandebie ===
Llandebie 1919
| Party | Candidate | Votes | % | ±% |
|---|---|---|---|---|
| Liberal | David Davies* | 808 | | |
| Labour | John Davies | 601 | | |
| Majority | | | | |
| Liberal hold | | Swing | | |

=== Llandilo Rural ===
Llandilo Rural 1919
| Party | Candidate | Votes | % | ±% |
|---|---|---|---|---|
| Liberal | L.N. Powell* | unopposed | | |
| Liberal hold | | Swing | | |

=== Llandilo Urban ===
Lord Dynevor captured the seat previously held by J. Towyn Jones MP.

Llandilo Urban 1919
| Party | Candidate | Votes | % | ±% |
|---|---|---|---|---|
| Conservative | Lord Dynevor | 440 | | |
| Liberal | John Stephens | 186 | | |
| Majority | | | | |
| Conservative gain from Liberal | | Swing | | |

=== Llandovery ===
Llandovery 1919
| Party | Candidate | Votes | % | ±% |
|---|---|---|---|---|
| Liberal | Harry Vaughan Watkins | 363 | | |
| Independent | J.C. Vaughan Pryse-Rice* | 191 | | |
| Majority | | | | |
| Liberal gain from Independent | | Swing | | |

=== Llandyssilio ===
Llandyssilio 1919
| Party | Candidate | Votes | % | ±% |
|---|---|---|---|---|
| Liberal | | unopposed | | |
| Liberal hold | | Swing | | |

=== Llanedy ===
Llanedy 1919
| Party | Candidate | Votes | % | ±% |
|---|---|---|---|---|
| Labour | T.J. Parry-Jones | 591 | | |
| Independent | David Evans | 367 | | |
| Independent | John White | 230 | | |
| Majority | | | | |
| Labour gain from Liberal | | Swing | | |

=== Llanegwad ===
Llanegwad 1919
| Party | Candidate | Votes | % | ±% |
|---|---|---|---|---|
| Independent | Delme Davies-Evans* | unopposed | | |
| Independent hold | | Swing | | |

=== Llanelly Division 1 ===
Llanelly Division 1 1919
| Party | Candidate | Votes | % | ±% |
|---|---|---|---|---|
| Independent | Lady Howard* | unopposed | | |
| Independent hold | | Swing | | |

=== Llanelly Division 2 ===
Llanelly Division 2 1919
| Party | Candidate | Votes | % | ±% |
|---|---|---|---|---|
| Liberal | William David* | unopposed | | |
| Liberal hold | | Swing | | |

=== Llanelly Division 3 ===
Llanelly Division 3 1919
| Party | Candidate | Votes | % | ±% |
|---|---|---|---|---|
| Labour | J.R. Jones | 311 | | |
| Conservative | T.P. Jones* | 228 | | |
| Majority | | | | |
| Labour gain from Conservative | | Swing | | |

=== Llanelly Division 4 ===
Llanelly Division 4 1919
| Party | Candidate | Votes | % | ±% |
|---|---|---|---|---|
| Liberal | John Thomas* | 472 | | |
| Labour | Tom Charles | 390 | | |
| Independent | Brinley Jones | 162 | | |
| Majority | | | | |
| Liberal hold | | Swing | | |

=== Llanelly Division 5 ===
Llanelly Division 5 1919
| Party | Candidate | Votes | % | ±% |
|---|---|---|---|---|
| Independent | Gwen Trubshaw | 434 | | |
| Liberal | D.C. Parry* | 189 | | |
| Majority | | | | |
| Independent gain from Liberal | | Swing | | |

=== Llanelly Division 6 ===
In pre-war contests, Joseph Roberts had stood as a Labour candidate.

Llanelly Division 6 1919
| Party | Candidate | Votes | % | ±% |
|---|---|---|---|---|
| Labour | T. Williams | 423 | | |
| Liberal | Joseph Roberts* | 416 | | |
| Majority | | | | |
| Labour hold | | Swing | | |

=== Llanelly Division 7 ===
Llanelly Division 7 1919
| Party | Candidate | Votes | % | ±% |
|---|---|---|---|---|
| Liberal | Hugh Jones* | unopposed | | |
| Liberal hold | | Swing | | |

=== Llanelly Division 8 ===
Llanelly Division 8 1919
| Party | Candidate | Votes | % | ±% |
|---|---|---|---|---|
| Labour | H.W. Bowen | 429 | | |
| Liberal | D.W. Jones | 248 | | |
| Independent | Alicia Phillips | 49 | | |
| Majority | | | | |
| Labour gain from Liberal | | Swing | | |

=== Llanelly Rural, Berwick ===
Llanelly Rural, Berwick 1919
| Party | Candidate | Votes | % | ±% |
|---|---|---|---|---|
| Liberal | David Harry* | 589 | | |
| Labour | Thomas Jenkins | 272 | | |
| Majority | | 317 | | |
| Liberal hold | | Swing | | |

=== Llanelly Rural, Hengoed ===
Llanelly Rural, Hengoed 1913
| Party | Candidate | Votes | % | ±% |
|---|---|---|---|---|
| Liberal | David John* | 392 | | |
| Labour | Joseph Howells | 338 | | |
| Majority | | | | |
| Liberal hold | | Swing | | |

=== Llanelly Rural, Westfa and Glyn ===
Llanelly Rural, Westfa and Glyn 1919
| Party | Candidate | Votes | % | ±% |
|---|---|---|---|---|
| Labour | William Jones | 383 | | |
| Independent | David John Lloyd | 214 | | |
| Independent | J. Rees Humphries | 163 | | |
| Majority | | | | |
| Labour gain from Liberal | | Swing | | |

=== Llanfihangel Aberbythick ===
Thomas Thomas received the support of the Trades and Labour Council. However, he was regarded as a Liberal candidate in most quarters.

Llanfihangel Aberbythick 1919
| Party | Candidate | Votes | % | ±% |
|---|---|---|---|---|
| Liberal | Thomas Thomas | 340 | | |
| Liberal | William Harris* | 250 | | |
| | J.T. Stephens | 72 | | |
| Majority | | | | |
| Liberal hold | | Swing | | |

=== Llanfihangel-ar-Arth ===
Llanfihangel-ar-Arth 1919
| Party | Candidate | Votes | % | ±% |
|---|---|---|---|---|
| Conservative | Thomas Rees Jones | 389 | | |
| Liberal | T. Lloyd Jones | 314 | | |
| Majority | | 75 | | |
| Conservative hold | | Swing | | |

=== Llangadock ===
Llangadock 1919
| Party | Candidate | Votes | % | ±% |
|---|---|---|---|---|
| Liberal | Walter Tudor Lewis | 488 | | |
| Conservative | Mervyn Lloyd Peel* | 248 | | |
| Majority | | | | |
| Liberal gain from Conservative | | Swing | | |

=== Llangeler ===
Llangeler 1919
| Party | Candidate | Votes | % | ±% |
|---|---|---|---|---|
| Conservative | Henry Davies | 570 | | |
| Liberal | Edward Teilo Owen | 567 | | |
| Majority | | 3 | | |
| Conservative hold | | Swing | | |

=== Llangendeirne ===
Llangendeirne 1919
| Party | Candidate | Votes | % | ±% |
|---|---|---|---|---|
| Liberal | R.H. Jones | 368 | | |
| Liberal | Thomas Jones | 344 | | |
| Majority | | 24 | | |
| Liberal hold | | Swing | | |

=== Llangennech ===
Llangennech 1919
| Party | Candidate | Votes | % | ±% |
|---|---|---|---|---|
| Liberal | D.J. Jones* | 481 | | |
| Labour | Philip Foster Owen | 327 | | |
| Majority | | | | |
| Liberal hold | | Swing | | |

=== Llangunnor ===
Llangunnor 1919
| Party | Candidate | Votes | % | ±% |
|---|---|---|---|---|
| Liberal | James Richards | 287 | | |
| Liberal | T. Howell Davies* | 275 | | |
| Majority | | | | |
| Liberal hold | | Swing | | |

=== Llanon ===
Llanon 1913
| Party | Candidate | Votes | % | ±% |
|---|---|---|---|---|
| Liberal | William Greville* | 621 | | |
| Labour | Rees Morgan | 607 | | |
| Majority | | 14 | | |
| Liberal hold | | Swing | | |

=== Llansawel ===
Llansawel 1913
| Party | Candidate | Votes | % | ±% |
|---|---|---|---|---|
| Conservative | James Hamlyn Williams Drummond* | unopposed | | |
| Conservative hold | | Swing | | |

=== Llanstephan ===
Llanstephan 1919
| Party | Candidate | Votes | % | ±% |
|---|---|---|---|---|
| Liberal | G. Barrett Evans* | 390 | | |
| Liberal | J.J. Bowen | 229 | | |
| Majority | | | | |
| Liberal hold | | Swing | | |

=== Llanybyther ===
Llanybyther 1913
| Party | Candidate | Votes | % | ±% |
|---|---|---|---|---|
| Liberal | Thomas Jones | 334 | | |
| Liberal | Dr E. Jones | 240 | | |
| Majority | | | | |
| Liberal hold | | Swing | | |

=== Mothvey ===
Mothvey 1919
| Party | Candidate | Votes | % | ±% |
|---|---|---|---|---|
| Liberal | David Davies* | unopposed | | |
| Liberal hold | | Swing | | |

=== Pembrey North ===
Pembrey North 1919
| Party | Candidate | Votes | % | ±% |
|---|---|---|---|---|
| | William Rogers | 520 | | |
| | E.T. Davies | 368 | | |
| Majority | | 152 | | |
| | Liberal hold | Swing | | |

=== Pembrey South ===
Pembrey South 1919
| Party | Candidate | Votes | % | ±% |
|---|---|---|---|---|
| Labour | John Henry Williams | Unopposed | N/A | N/A |
| Labour hold | | | | |

=== Quarter Bach ===
Quarter Bach 1919
| Party | Candidate | Votes | % | ±% |
|---|---|---|---|---|
| Labour | Griffith Williams* | 661 | | |
| Liberal | Gomer Harris | 463 | | |
| Majority | | | | |
| Liberal hold | | Swing | | |

=== Rhydcymmerai ===
Rhydcymmerai 1919
| Party | Candidate | Votes | % | ±% |
|---|---|---|---|---|
| Liberal | D.E. Davies | 234 | | |
| Liberal | R.L. Evans | 230 | | |
| Majority | | | | |
| Liberal hold | | Swing | | |

=== St Clears ===
St Clears 1919
| Party | Candidate | Votes | % | ±% |
|---|---|---|---|---|
| Liberal | W.R. Rogers* | unopposed | | |
| Liberal hold | | Swing | | |

=== St Ishmael ===
St Ishmael 1919
| Party | Candidate | Votes | % | ±% |
|---|---|---|---|---|
| Liberal | John Jones | 304 | | |
| Liberal | Evan Bowen* | 208 | | |
| Conservative | Robert B. Elliott | 164 | | |
| Majority | | | | |
| Liberal hold | | Swing | | |

=== Trelech ===
Trelech 1919
| Party | Candidate | Votes | % | ±% |
|---|---|---|---|---|
| Liberal | Philip Phillips* | unopposed | | |
| Liberal hold | | Swing | | |

=== Whitland ===
Whitland 1919
| Party | Candidate | Votes | % | ±% |
|---|---|---|---|---|
| Liberal | William Thomas* | 502 | | |
| | Peter Howells | 137 | | |
| Majority | | | | |
| Liberal hold | | Swing | | |

== Election of aldermen ==
In addition to the 53 councillors the council consisted of 17 county aldermen. Aldermen were elected by the council, and served a six-year term.

The following aldermen stood down at the election. None of them stood at the election and were re-elected at the statutory meeting. Labour councillor Dr J.H. Williams gave notice that he would propose that, in future, all aldermen should seek re-election to the Council before retaining their seats on the aldermanic bench.

- Rev William Davies, Llandeilo
- David Evans, Whitland
- William Griffiths, Llanelli
- Thomas Jones, Llanelli
- W.N. Jones, Ammanford
- Rev E.B. Lloyd, Bwlchnewydd
- John Lloyd, Abegwili
- James Phillips, St Clears
- J. Lloyd Thomas, Feryside
