= 1928 Carmarthenshire County Council election =

Welsh local election

All 53 seats to Carmarthenshire County Council 27 seats needed for a majority
	First party	Second party	Third party
Party	Liberal	Conservative	Labour
Seats won	0/53	0/53	0/53
	Fourth party	Fifth party
Party	Independent	Liberal Unionist
Seats won	1/51	0/51
Council control after election
TBD

An election to the Carmarthenshire County Council was held in March 1928. It was preceded by the 1925 election and followed by the 1931 election.

== Overview of the result ==
The election saw the disappearance of the Conservative and Liberal parties from county elections in Carmarthenshire, and contests would henceforth be between Labour and the Independents. Labour did not make significant progress in 1928 and it was claimed that the party lacked the resources to make a significant challenge.

== Boundary changes ==
There were no boundary changes.

== Candidates ==
Only 18 of the 53 divisions were contested, the same number as in 1925.

== Outcome ==
Most of the contested elections were in the eastern part of the county. Elsewhere, there were some contests where Independent candidates faced each other. Two such contests at Llanybydder and Rhydcymerau saw two Independents who were also brothers lose their seats.

In the Llanelli area there were a number of closely fought contests between Independents and Labour candidates. In Llanelli Borough, Labour held their only seat but Independents held off challenges in the other wards. These included Ward 4, where W.T. Morris held his seat against Tom Charles by 46 votes, having lost his borough council seat to the same opponent two years previously. The Llanelly Star considered this to be a 'great personal victory' for Morris.

== Division results ==
=== Abergwili ===
Abergwili 1928
Party	Candidate	Votes	%	±%
Independent	David Davies*	unopposed		
Independent hold		Swing		

=== Ammanford ===
Ammanford 1928
Party	Candidate	Votes	%	±%
Labour	David George*	unopposed		
Labour hold		Swing		

=== Bettws ===
Bettws 1928
Party	Candidate	Votes	%	±%
Independent	John Phillips*	unopposed		
Independent hold		Swing		

=== Caio ===
Caio 1928
Party	Candidate	Votes	%	±%
Independent	Isaac Williams*	unopposed		
Independent hold		Swing		

=== Carmarthen Eastern Ward (Lower Division) ===
Carmarthen Eastern Ward (Lower Division) 1928
Party	Candidate	Votes	%	±%
Independent	David Denzil Harries*	unopposed		
Independent hold		Swing		

=== Carmarthen Eastern Ward (Upper Division) ===
Carmarthen Eastern Ward (Upper Division) 1928
Party	Candidate	Votes	%	±%
Independent	Lewis David Thomas*	unopposed		
Independent hold		Swing		

=== Carmarthen Western Ward (Lower Division) ===
Carmarthen Western Ward (Lower Division) 1928
Party	Candidate	Votes	%	±%
Independent	H.S. Holmes*	unopposed		
Independent hold		Swing		

=== Carmarthen Western Ward (Upper Division) ===
Carmarthen Western Ward (Upper Division) 1928
Party	Candidate	Votes	%	±%
Independent	William Price Williams*	552		
Labour	Benjamin Charles	429		
Majority				
Independent hold		Swing		

=== Cenarth ===
Cenarth 1928
Party	Candidate	Votes	%	±%
Independent	David George Lloyd*	unopposed		
Independent hold		Swing		

=== Cilycwm ===
Cilycwm 1928
Party	Candidate	Votes	%	±%
Independent	Ivor Elystan Campbell-Davys*	unopposed		
Independent hold		Swing		

=== Conwil ===
Conwil 1928
Party	Candidate	Votes	%	±%
Independent	Thomas Jones*	unopposed		
Independent hold		Swing		

=== Kidwelly ===
Kidwelly 1928
Party	Candidate	Votes	%	±%
Independent	Alfred Stephens*	unopposed		
Independent hold		Swing		

=== Laugharne ===
Laugharne 1925
Party	Candidate	Votes	%	±%
Liberal	T.S.K. Morse	unpopposed		
Liberal hold		Swing		

=== Llanarthney ===
Llanarthney 1928
Party	Candidate	Votes	%	±%
Independent	David Stephens*	unopposed		
Independent hold		Swing		

=== Llanboidy ===
Llanboidy 1928
Party	Candidate	Votes	%	±%
Independent	William Thomas*	unopposed		
Independent hold		Swing		

=== Llandebie ===
Llandebie 1928
Party	Candidate	Votes	%	±%
Labour	D.B. Lewis*	1,616		
Independent	Frederick Davies	1,011		
Majority				
Labour hold		Swing		

=== Llandilo Rural ===
Llandilo Rural 1928
Party	Candidate	Votes	%	±%
Independent	Evan Davies	585		
Independent	John Henry James	518		
Majority				
Independent hold		Swing		

=== Llandilo Urban ===
Llandilo Urban 1928
Party	Candidate	Votes	%	±%
Independent	Lord Dynevor*	unopposed		
Independent hold		Swing		

=== Llandovery ===
Llandovery 1928
Party	Candidate	Votes	%	±%
Independent	Harry Vaughan Watkins*	unopposed		
Independent hold		Swing		

=== Llandyssilio ===
Llandyssilio 1928
Party	Candidate	Votes	%	±%
Independent	Edward James*	unopposed		
Independent hold		Swing		

=== Llanedy ===
Llanedy 1928
Party	Candidate	Votes	%	±%
Labour	T.J. Parry-Jones*	unopposed		
Labour hold		Swing		

=== Llanegwad ===
Llanegwad 1928
Party	Candidate	Votes	%	±%
Independent	William David Davies*	unopposed		
Independent hold		Swing		

=== Llanelly Division 1 ===
Llanelly Division 1 1928
Party	Candidate	Votes	%	±%
Independent	Daniel Roberts*	unopposed		
Independent hold		Swing		

=== Llanelly Division 2 ===
Llanelly Division 2 1928
Party	Candidate	Votes	%	±%
Independent	Brinley R. Jones	568		
Independent	James Jones	325		
Labour	F. Stanley Davies	276		
Majority				
Independent hold		Swing		

=== Llanelly Division 3 ===
Llanelly Division 3 1928
Party	Candidate	Votes	%	±%
Independent	Joseph Roberts*	unopposed		
Independent hold		Swing		

=== Llanelly Division 4 ===
Llanelly Division 4 1928
Party	Candidate	Votes	%	±%
Independent	W.T. Morris*	767		
Labour	Thomas Charles	721		
Majority				
Independent hold		Swing		

=== Llanelly Division 5 ===
Llanelly Division 5 1928
Party	Candidate	Votes	%	±%
Independent	Gwen Trubshaw*	729		
Labour	W. Douglas Hughes	243		
Majority				
Independent hold		Swing		

=== Llanelly Division 6 ===
Llanelly Division 6 1928
Party	Candidate	Votes	%	±%
Labour	Thomas Williams*	704		
Independent	D. Haddon Jones	507		
Majority				
Labour hold		Swing		

=== Llanelly Division 7 ===
Llanelly Division 7 1928
Party	Candidate	Votes	%	±%
Independent	W. Powell Rees*	unopposed		
Independent hold		Swing		

=== Llanelly Division 8 ===
Llanelly Division 8 1928
Party	Candidate	Votes	%	±%
Independent	William Davies*	unopposed		
Independent hold		Swing		

=== Llanelly Rural, Berwick ===
Llanelly Rural, Berwick 1928
Party	Candidate	Votes	%	±%
Labour	J.R. Jones	663		
Independent	David Harry*	621		
Independent	W.J. Morris	179		
Majority				
Labour gain from Independent		Swing		

=== Llanelly Rural, Hengoed ===
Llanelly Rural, Hengoed 1928
Party	Candidate	Votes	%	±%
Labour	Joseph Howells*	668		
Independent	E.V. Williams	429		
Majority				
Labour hold		Swing		

=== Llanelly Rural, Westfa and Glyn ===
Llanelly Rural, Westfa and Glyn 1928
Party	Candidate	Votes	%	±%
Labour	William Jones*	unopposed		
Labour hold		Swing		

=== Llanfihangel Aberbythick ===
Llanfihangel Aberbythick 1928
Party	Candidate	Votes	%	±%
Independent	Thomas Thomas*	unopposed		
Independent hold		Swing		

=== Llanfihangel-ar-Arth ===
Llanfihangel-ar-Arth 1928
Party	Candidate	Votes	%	±%
Independent	E. Haydn Davies	445		
Independent	Mary P.A.E. Mansell	185		
Independent	John Davies	174		
Independent	W.G. Evans	80		
Majority				
Independent hold		Swing		

=== Llangadock ===
Llangadock 1928
Party	Candidate	Votes	%	±%
Independent	Mervyn Peel*	unopposed		
Independent hold		Swing		

=== Llangeler ===
Llangeler 1928
Party	Candidate	Votes	%	±%
Independent	Henry Jones			
Independent gain from Labour		Swing		

=== Llangendeirne ===
Llangendeirne 1925
Party	Candidate	Votes	%	±%
Independent	James Jenkins*	675		
Labour	Gomer Evans	638		
Majority				
Independent hold		Swing		

=== Llangennech ===
Llangennech 1928
Party	Candidate	Votes	%	±%
Independent	David J. Jones*	unopposed		
Independent hold		Swing		

=== Llangunnor ===
Llangunnor 1928
Party	Candidate	Votes	%	±%
Independent	William Edwards	449		
Independent	T. Howell Davies*	334		
Majority				
Independent hold		Swing		

=== Llanon ===
Llanon 1928
Party	Candidate	Votes	%	±%
Independent	William Greville*	1,005		
Labour	Rees Morgan	978		
Majority				
Independent hold		Swing		

=== Llansawel ===
Llansawel 1928
Party	Candidate	Votes	%	±%
Independent	Evan Harris	unopposed		
Independent hold		Swing		

=== Llanstephan ===
Llanstephan 1928
Party	Candidate	Votes	%	±%
Independent	John James Bowen*	unopposed		
Independent hold		Swing		

=== Llanybyther ===
Llanybyther 1928
Party	Candidate	Votes	%	±%
Independent	W.J. Williams	643		
Independent	E.M. Evans*	408		
Majority				
Independent hold		Swing		

=== Mothvey ===
Mothvey 1928
Party	Candidate	Votes	%	±%
Independent	David Davies*	unopposed		
Independent hold		Swing		

=== Pembrey North ===
Pembrey North 1928
Party	Candidate	Votes	%	±%
Independent	David Evans	757		
Labour	William Rogers*	496		
Independent	J.H. Rees	225		
Majority		261		
Independent gain from Labour		Swing		

=== Pembrey South ===
Pembrey South 1928
Party	Candidate	Votes	%	±%
Labour	John Henry Williams	897		
Liberal	Gravelle	749		
Majority				
Labour hold		Swing		

=== Quarter Bach ===
Quarter Bach 1928
Party	Candidate	Votes	%	±%
Labour	Griffith Williams*	unopposed		
Labour hold		Swing		

=== Rhydcymmerai ===
Rhydcymmerai 1928
Party	Candidate	Votes	%	±%
Independent	Gwyneth M. Price Price	296		
Independent	Rees Llewellyn Evans*	210		
Majority				
Independent hold		Swing		

=== St Clears ===
St Clears 1928
Party	Candidate	Votes	%	±%
Independent	William Roberts Rogers*	unopposed		
Independent hold		Swing		

=== St Ishmael ===
St Ishmael 1928
Party	Candidate	Votes	%	±%
Independent	Walter Davies*	unopposed		
Independent hold		Swing		

=== Trelech ===
Trelech 1928
Party	Candidate	Votes	%	±%
Independent	D.L. Bowen*	unopposed		
Independent hold		Swing		

=== Whitland ===
Whitland 1928
Party	Candidate	Votes	%	±%
Independent	T.I. Phillips	559		
	Henry Thomas	305		
Majority		254		
Independent hold		Swing		

== Election of aldermen ==
In addition to the 53 councillors, the council consisted of 17 county aldermen. Aldermen were elected by the council, and served a six-year term. Following the elections, the following eight aldermen were elected (with the number of votes in each case):

- Thomas Morris
- Thomas Thomas
- W.J. Williams
- Sir Dudley Drummond
- Ben Evans
- John Lewis
- H.E. Blagdon-Richards
- L.N. Powell

On behalf of the eastern members of the Council, Labour member D.B. Lewis of Llandybie protested against the re-election of aldermen who had not faced the electorate. However, he declared that on this occasion they had decided not to oppose the re-election of aldermen who had not been given advance notice. This was not the first time this matter had been raised by Labour councillors.
