= 1931 Carmarthenshire County Council election =

Welsh local election

All 53 seats to Carmarthenshire County Council 27 seats needed for a majority
	First party	Second party	Third party
Party	Liberal	Conservative	Labour
Seats won	0/53	0/53	0/53
	Fourth party	Fifth party
Party	Independent	Liberal Unionist
Seats won	1/51	0/51
Council control after election
TBD

An election to the Carmarthenshire County Council was held in March 1931. It was preceded by the 1928 election and followed by the 1934 election.

== Overview of the result ==
The Independent group remained the majority grouping on the Council. In the Llanelli area the potential for Labour to win further ground was complicated by the appearance of Communist Party candidates.

== Boundary changes ==
There was one boundary change, namely the division of the existing Llandybie ward into two divisions, each of which was won by Labour.

== Results ==
Only a minority of the 53 divisions were contested. 53 councillors were elected.

== Division results ==
=== Abergwili ===
Abergwili 1931
Party	Candidate	Votes	%	±%
Independent	David Davies*	unopposed		
Independent hold		Swing		

=== Ammanford ===
Ammanford 1931
Party	Candidate	Votes	%	±%
Labour	David George*	unopposed		
Labour hold		Swing		

=== Bettws ===
Bettws 1931
Party	Candidate	Votes	%	±%
Independent	John Phillips*	1,379		
Independent	D.M. Richards	800		
Independent hold		Swing		

=== Caio ===
Caio 1931
Party	Candidate	Votes	%	±%
Independent	Isaac Williams*	unopposed		
Independent hold		Swing		

=== Carmarthen Eastern Ward (Lower Division) ===
Carmarthen Eastern Ward (Lower Division) 1931
Party	Candidate	Votes	%	±%
Independent	Katherine Isobel Harries	unopposed		
Independent hold		Swing		

=== Carmarthen Eastern Ward (Upper Division) ===
Carmarthen Eastern Ward (Upper Division) 1931
Party	Candidate	Votes	%	±%
Independent	Lewis David Thomas*	unopposed		
Independent hold		Swing		

=== Carmarthen Western Ward (Lower Division) ===
Carmarthen Western Ward (Lower Division) 1931
Party	Candidate	Votes	%	±%
Independent	H.S. Holmes*	unopposed		
Independent hold		Swing		

=== Carmarthen Western Ward (Upper Division) ===
Carmarthen Western Ward (Upper Division) 1931
Party	Candidate	Votes	%	±%
Independent	William Price Williams*	unopposed		
Independent hold		Swing		

=== Cenarth ===
Cenarth 1931
Party	Candidate	Votes	%	±%
Independent	Ellenora James*	unopposed		
Independent hold		Swing		

=== Cilycwm ===
Cilycwm 1931
Party	Candidate	Votes	%	±%
Independent	Ivor Elystan Campbell-Davys*	unopposed		
Independent hold		Swing		

=== Conwil ===
Conwil 1931
Party	Candidate	Votes	%	±%
Independent	Thomas Jones*	unopposed		
Independent hold		Swing		

=== Kidwelly ===
Kidwelly 1931
Party	Candidate	Votes	%	±%
Independent	Alfred Stephens*	unopposed		
Independent hold		Swing		

=== Laugharne ===
Laugharne 1931
Party	Candidate	Votes	%	±%
Independent	Thomas Stephen Thomas*	unopposed		
Independent hold		Swing		

=== Llanarthney ===
Llanarthney 1931
Party	Candidate	Votes	%	±%
Independent	David Stephens*	1,561		
Labour	Thomas Thomas	604		
Independent hold		Swing		

=== Llanboidy ===
Llanboidy 1931
Party	Candidate	Votes	%	±%
Independent	C. Vaughan*	unopposed		
Independent hold		Swing		

=== Llandebie North ===
Boundary Change

Llandebie North 1931
Party	Candidate	Votes	%	±%
Labour	Gwilym R. Thomas	552		
Independent	David O. Davies	403		
Independent	Frederick Davies	225		
Majority				
Labour win (new seat)				

=== Llandebie South ===
Boundary Change

Llandebie South 1931
Party	Candidate	Votes	%	±%
Labour	D.B. Lewis*	unopposed		
Labour win (new seat)				

=== Llandilo Rural ===
Llandilo Rural 1931
Party	Candidate	Votes	%	±%
Independent	Evan Davies*	560		
Independent	John Henry James	424		
Independent	Owen Jones	169		
Majority				
Independent hold		Swing		

=== Llandilo Urban ===
Llandilo Urban 1931
Party	Candidate	Votes	%	±%
Independent	Lord Dynevor*	unopposed		
Independent hold		Swing		

=== Llandovery ===
Llandovery 1931
Party	Candidate	Votes	%	±%
Independent	Harry Vaughan Watkins*	unopposed		
Independent hold		Swing		

=== Llandyssilio ===
Llandyssilio 1931
Party	Candidate	Votes	%	±%
Independent	Edward James*	unopposed		
Independent hold		Swing		

=== Llanedy ===
Llanedy 1931
Party	Candidate	Votes	%	±%
Labour	T.J. Parry-Jones*	unopposed		
Labour hold		Swing		

=== Llanegwad ===
Llanegwad 1931
Party	Candidate	Votes	%	±%
Independent	William David Davies*	unopposed		
Independent hold		Swing		

=== Llanelly Division 1 ===
Llanelly Division 1 1931
Party	Candidate	Votes	%	±%
Independent	Daniel Roberts*	1,047		
Labour	S.T. Vicary	257		
Communist	A. Evans	51		
Independent hold		Swing		

=== Llanelly Division 2 ===
Llanelly Division 2 1931
Party	Candidate	Votes	%	±%
Independent	Brinley R. Jones*	488		
Independent	James Jones	371		
Labour	John Roberts	323		
Independent	Elizabeth Thomas	49		
Majority				
Independent hold		Swing		

=== Llanelly Division 3 ===
Llanelly Division 3 1931
Party	Candidate	Votes	%	±%
Independent	Joseph Roberts*	521		
Labour	Percy M. Evans	252		
Communist	Brin Jones	55		
Independent hold		Swing		

=== Llanelly Division 4 ===
Llanelly Division 4 1931
Party	Candidate	Votes	%	±%
Independent	W.T. Morris*	670		
Labour	Thomas Charles	624		
Communist	William Morris	50		
Majority				
Independent hold		Swing		

=== Llanelly Division 5 ===
Llanelly Division 5 1931
Party	Candidate	Votes	%	±%
Independent	Gwen Trubshaw*	621		
Labour	Mary M. Griffiths	174		
Majority				
Independent hold		Swing		

=== Llanelly Division 6 ===
Llanelly Division 6 1931
Party	Candidate	Votes	%	±%
Labour	W. Douglas Hughes	636		
Independent	Agnes H. Evans	334		
Communist	Enoch Collins	51		
Majority				
Labour hold		Swing		

=== Llanelly Division 7 ===
Llanelly Division 7 1928
Party	Candidate	Votes	%	±%
Independent	W. Powell Rees*	806		
Labour	David John	184		
Communist	Henry Jones	16		
Independent hold		Swing		

=== Llanelly Division 8 ===
Llanelly Division 8 1928
Party	Candidate	Votes	%	±%
Labour	H.W. Bowen	515		
Independent	William Davies*	377		
Communist	Enoch Collins	28		
Independent hold		Swing		

=== Llanelly Rural, Berwick ===
Llanelly Rural, Berwick 1931
Party	Candidate	Votes	%	±%
Independent	David Harry	999		
Labour	J.R. Jones*	680		
Majority				
Independent gain from Labour		Swing		

=== Llanelly Rural, Hengoed ===
Joe Howells stood as an Independent against the official Labour candidate and won by a very narrow margin.

Llanelly Rural, Hengoed 1931
Party	Candidate	Votes	%	±%
Independent	Joseph Howells*	436		
Independent	D.J. Stone	420		
Labour	John Harris	398		
Communist	Arthur Evans	11		
Majority				
Independent gain from Labour		Swing		

=== Llanelly Rural, Westfa and Glyn ===
Llanelly Rural, Westfa and Glyn 1931
Party	Candidate	Votes	%	±%
Labour	William Jones*	998		
Communist	S. Edwards	180		
Labour hold		Swing		

=== Llanfihangel Aberbythick ===
Llanfihangel Aberbythick 1931
Party	Candidate	Votes	%	±%
Independent	W.J. Evans*	unopposed		
Independent hold		Swing		

=== Llanfihangel-ar-Arth ===
Llanfihangel-ar-Arth 1931
Party	Candidate	Votes	%	±%
Independent	E. Haydn Davies*	709		
Independent	Mary P.A.E. Mansell	171		
Majority				
Independent hold		Swing		

=== Llangadock ===
Llangadock 1931
Party	Candidate	Votes	%	±%
Independent	R.E. Williams*	unopposed		
Independent hold		Swing		

=== Llangeler ===
Llangeler 1931
Party	Candidate	Votes	%	±%
Independent	Henry Jones	unopposed		
Independent hold		Swing		

=== Llangendeirne ===
Llangendeirne 1931
Party	Candidate	Votes	%	±%
Independent	James Jenkins*	unopposed		
Independent hold		Swing		

=== Llangennech ===
Llangennech 1931
Party	Candidate	Votes	%	±%
Labour	D.J. Davies	570		
Independent	David J. Jones*	548		
Labour gain from Independent		Swing		

=== Llangunnor ===
Llangunnor 1931
Party	Candidate	Votes	%	±%
Independent	William Edwards*	unopposed		
Independent hold		Swing		

=== Llanon ===
Llanon 1931
Party	Candidate	Votes	%	±%
Labour	Rees Morgan*	unopposed		
Labour hold		Swing		

=== Llansawel ===
Llansawel 1931
Party	Candidate	Votes	%	±%
Independent	Evan Harris*	unopposed		
Independent hold		Swing		

=== Llanstephan ===
Llanstephan 1931
Party	Candidate	Votes	%	±%
Independent	T.Ll. Haries	369		
Independent	John James Bowen*	355		
Independent hold		Swing		

=== Llanybyther ===
Llanybyther 1931
Party	Candidate	Votes	%	±%
Independent	Evan Morgan Evans	562		
Independent	W. James Williams*	527		
Majority				
Independent hold		Swing		

=== Myddfai ===
Myddfai 1931
Party	Candidate	Votes	%	±%
Independent	David Davies*	unopposed		
Independent hold		Swing		

=== Pembrey North ===
Pembrey North 1928
Party	Candidate	Votes	%	±%
Labour	Gomer Evans	1.095		
Independent	David Evans*	455		
Communist	Brin Jones	79		
Majority				
Labour gain from Independent		Swing		

=== Pembrey South ===
Pembrey South 1928
Party	Candidate	Votes	%	±%
Labour	John Henry Williams*	994		
Independent	Daniel Davies	293		
Communist	Henry Jones	22		
Majority				
Labour hold		Swing		

=== Quarter Bach ===
Quarter Bach 1931
Party	Candidate	Votes	%	±%
Labour	William Jones*	886		
Independent	Gomer Harries	680		
Labour hold		Swing		

=== Rhydcymmerai ===
Rhydcymmerai 1931
Party	Candidate	Votes	%	±%
Independent	Gwendoline Lloyd-Price*	unopposed		
Independent hold		Swing		

=== St Clears ===
St Clears 1931
Party	Candidate	Votes	%	±%
Independent	Joseph David Rees*	unopposed		
Independent hold		Swing		

=== St Ishmael ===
St Ishmael 1931
Party	Candidate	Votes	%	±%
Independent	Walter Davies*	unopposed		
Independent hold		Swing		

=== Trelech ===
Trelech 1931
Party	Candidate	Votes	%	±%
Independent	Lewis L. Bowen*	unopposed		
Independent hold		Swing		

=== Whitland ===
Whitland 1931
Party	Candidate	Votes	%	±%
Independent	Thomas Lewis Phillips*	unopposed		
Independent hold		Swing		

== Election of aldermen ==
In addition to the 53 councillors the council consisted of 17 county aldermen. Aldermen were elected by the council, and served a six-year term. Following the elections the following nine aldermen were elected. Eight were retiring aldermen (some of whom had not fought an election for many years) while Joseph Roberts had been re-elected in Llanelly Division 3.

- T.R. Jones, Cross Hall
- James Phillips, St Clears
- Philip Phillips, Pencraig
- W.R. Rogers, Closyfran
- Rev William Thomas, Llanboidy
- David Davies, Rhyblid
- John Thomas, Llanelli
- Joseph Roberts, Llanelli
- W.N.Jones, Ammanford

In addition, W.D. Davies, recently re-elected unopposed for the Llanegwad division, was elevated to the aldermanic bench following the death of L.N. Powell.

== By-elections 1931-1934 ==
=== 1931 Llanegwad by-election ===
A by-election was scheduled for March 1931 following the elevation of W.D. Davies to the aldermanic bench. B. Davies of Glancothi was elected unopposed in his place.

Llanegwad by-election March 1931
Party	Candidate	Votes	%	±%
Independent	B. Davies	unopposed		
Independent hold		Swing		

=== 1931 Llanelly Division 3 by-election ===
A by-election was held in April due to the elevation of Joseph Roberts to the aldermanic bench. Strong objections were raised in the local press to the prospect of several Independent candidates contesting the vacancy, and these fears were realised when Labour candidate Percy Evans headed the poll with around a third of the votes cast. Gomer Thomas, chosen as an official candidate by the Ratepayers' Association, polled only 89 votes.

Llanelly Division 3 by-election
Party	Candidate	Votes	%	±%
Labour	Percy M. Evans	389		
Independent	D. Haddon Jones	296		
Independent	James Jones	248		
Independent	Gomer Thomas	89		
Independent	Elizabeth Thomas	10		
Independent hold		Swing		

=== 1932 Llandissilio by-election ===
A by-election was held in December 1932 following the elevation of Edward James to the aldermanic bench. Henry Morris, a mamber of Whitland RDC for 28 years, was elected by a narrow majority

1932 Llandissilio by-election
Party	Candidate	Votes	%	±%
Independent	Henry Morris	285		
Independent	Rev W.S. Thomas	269		
Independent hold		Swing		
