= 1925 Carmarthenshire County Council election =

Welsh local election

All 53 seats to Carmarthenshire County Council 27 seats needed for a majority
	First party	Second party	Third party
Party	Liberal	Conservative	Labour
Seats won	0/53	0/53	0/53
	Fourth party	Fifth party
Party	Independent	Liberal Unionist
Seats won	1/51	0/51
Council control after election
TBD

An election to the Carmarthenshire County Council was held in March 1925. It was preceded by the 1922 election and followed by the 1928 election.

== Overview of the result ==
The election saw a reduction in the number of candidates openly supporting the Liberal Party as an increasing number stood as Independents. Labour continued to gain some ground in the Llanelli and Ammanford districts.

== Boundary changes ==
There were no boundary changes.

== Unopposed returns ==
All but eighteen of the 53 divisions were uncontested, with the majority of the unopposed returns being in the rural parts of the county. All three seats in Carmarthen town were uncontested after the local Labour Party held a meeting to consider the question but decided to put no candidates forward.

== Contested elections ==
Conservatives and Liberals increasingly stood as Independents in those contests that took place. One local newspaper commented that a lack of interest on the part of the electorate was a feature of most of the eighteen contests that took place. Labour once again failed to make any real advance in Llanelli town.

== Retiring aldermen ==
The aldermen who retired at the election were

== Division results ==
=== Abergwili ===
Abergwili 1925
Party	Candidate	Votes	%	±%
Liberal	David Davies	446		
Conservative	William Williams	309		
Majority				
Liberal gain from Conservative		Swing		

=== Ammanford ===
Ammanford 1925
Party	Candidate	Votes	%	±%
Labour	David George*	unopposed		
Labour hold		Swing		

=== Bettws ===
Bettws 1925
Party	Candidate	Votes	%	±%
Independent	John Phillips*	unopposed		
Independent hold		Swing		

=== Caio ===
Caio 1925
Party	Candidate	Votes	%	±%
Independent	Isaac Williams*	415		
Independent	David Jones	230		
Majority				
Independent hold		Swing		

=== Carmarthen Eastern Ward (Lower Division) ===
Carmarthen Eastern Ward (Lower Division) 1925
Party	Candidate	Votes	%	±%
Liberal	David Denzil Harries*	unopposed		
Liberal hold		Swing		

=== Carmarthen Eastern Ward (Upper Division) ===
Carmarthen Eastern Ward (Upper Division) 1925
Party	Candidate	Votes	%	±%
Independent	Lewis David Thomas*	unopposed		
Independent hold		Swing		

=== Carmarthen Western Ward (Lower Division) ===
Carmarthen Western Ward (Lower Division) 1925
Party	Candidate	Votes	%	±%
Conservative	H.S. Holmes*	unopposed		
Conservative hold		Swing		

=== Carmarthen Western Ward (Upper Division) ===
Carmarthen Western Ward (Upper Division) 1925
Party	Candidate	Votes	%	±%
Liberal	William Price Williams*	unopposed		
Liberal hold		Swing		

=== Cenarth ===
Cenarth 1919
Party	Candidate	Votes	%	±%
	D.C. Lloyd	unopposed		
	Liberal hold	Swing		

=== Cilycwm ===
Cilycwm 1925
Party	Candidate	Votes	%	±%
Conservative	Ivor Elystan Campbell-Davys*	unopposed		
Conservative hold		Swing		

=== Conwil ===
Conwil 1925
Party	Candidate	Votes	%	±%
Liberal	Thomas Jones*	unopposed		
Liberal hold		Swing		

=== Kidwelly ===
Kidwelly 1925
Party	Candidate	Votes	%	±%
Conservative	Alfred Stephens*	561		
Labour	T.R. Griffiths	535		
Majority				
Conservative hold		Swing		

=== Laugharne ===
Laugharne 1925
Party	Candidate	Votes	%	±%
Liberal	T.S.K. Morse	unopposed		
Liberal hold		Swing		

=== Llanarthney ===
Llanarthney 1925
Party	Candidate	Votes	%	±%
Liberal	David Stephens*	unopposed		
Liberal hold		Swing		

=== Llanboidy ===
Llanboidy 1925
Party	Candidate	Votes	%	±%
Liberal	William Thomas*	unopposed		
Liberal hold		Swing		

=== Llandebie ===
Llandebie 1925
Party	Candidate	Votes	%	±%
Labour	D.B. Lewis*	unopposed		
Labour hold		Swing		

=== Llandilo Rural ===
Llandilo Rural 1922
Party	Candidate	Votes	%	±%
Liberal	L.N. Powell*	unopposed		
Liberal hold		Swing		

=== Llandilo Urban ===
Llandilo Urban 1925
Party	Candidate	Votes	%	±%
Conservative	Lord Dynevor*	Unopposed	N/A	N/A
Conservative hold				

=== Llandovery ===
Llandovery 1925
Party	Candidate	Votes	%	±%
Liberal	Harry Vaughan Watkins*	unopposed		
Liberal hold		Swing		

=== Llandyssilio ===
Llandyssilio 1925
Party	Candidate	Votes	%	±%
Liberal	Edward James*	unopposed		
Liberal hold		Swing		

=== Llanedy ===
Llanedy 1925
Party	Candidate	Votes	%	±%
Labour	T.J. Parry-Jones*	unopposed		
Labour hold		Swing		

=== Llanegwad ===
Llanegwad 1925
Party	Candidate	Votes	%	±%
Independent	William David Davies*	unopposed		
Independent hold		Swing		

=== Llanelly Division 1 ===
Llanelly Division 1 1925
Party	Candidate	Votes	%	±%
Independent	Daniel Roberts*	unopposed		
Independent hold		Swing		

=== Llanelly Division 2 ===
Llanelly Division 2 1922
Party	Candidate	Votes	%	±%
Independent	H. Hayton Williams*	477		
Labour	J.R. Jones	274		
Majority				
Independent hold		Swing		

=== Llanelly Division 3 ===
Llanelly Division 3 1925
Party	Candidate	Votes	%	±%
Independent	Joseph Roberts*	563		
Labour	R. Neft	149		
Majority				
Independent hold		Swing		

=== Llanelly Division 4 ===
Llanelly Division 4 1925
Party	Candidate	Votes	%	±%
Independent	W.T. Morris	713		
Labour	Ben Griffiths	484		
Majority				
Independent hold		Swing		

=== Llanelly Division 5 ===
Llanelly Division 5 1925
Party	Candidate	Votes	%	±%
Independent	Gwen Trubshaw*	unopposed		
Independent hold		Swing		

=== Llanelly Division 6 ===
Llanelly Division 6 1925
Party	Candidate	Votes	%	±%
Labour	Thomas Williams*	unopposed		
Labour hold		Swing		

=== Llanelly Division 7 ===
Llanelly Division 7 1925
Party	Candidate	Votes	%	±%
Independent	W. Powell Rees*	unopposed		
Independent hold		Swing		

=== Llanelly Division 8 ===
Llanelly Division 8 1925
Party	Candidate	Votes	%	±%
Independent	William Davies*	591		
Labour	J.J. Winter	276		
Majority				
Independent hold		Swing		

=== Llanelly Rural, Berwick ===
Llanelly Rural, Berwick 1925
Party	Candidate	Votes	%	±%
Independent	David Harry*	unopposed		
Independent hold		Swing		

=== Llanelly Rural, Hengoed ===
Llanelly Rural, Hengoed 1925
Party	Candidate	Votes	%	±%
Labour	Joseph Howells*	unopposed		
Labour hold		Swing		

=== Llanelly Rural, Westfa and Glyn ===
Llanelly Rural, Westfa and Glyn 1925
Party	Candidate	Votes	%	±%
Labour	William Jones*	unopposed		
Labour hold		Swing		

=== Llanfihangel Aberbythick ===
Llanfihangel Aberbythick 1925
Party	Candidate	Votes	%	±%
Liberal	Thomas Thomas*	unopposed		
Liberal hold		Swing		

=== Llanfihangel-ar-Arth ===
Llanfihangel-ar-Arth 1922
Party	Candidate	Votes	%	±%
	J.D. Evans	529		
	Lady Mansell*	332		
Majority				
		Swing		

=== Llangadock ===
Llangadock 1925
Party	Candidate	Votes	%	±%
Independent	Walter Tudor Lewis*	563		
Independent	William Jones	325		
Majority				
Independent hold		Swing		

=== Llangeler ===
Llangeler 1925
Party	Candidate	Votes	%	±%
Labour	Edward Teilo Owen			
Conservative	Henry Jones*			
Majority		38		
Labour gain from Conservative		Swing		

=== Llangendeirne ===
Llangendeirne 1925
Party	Candidate	Votes	%	±%
Liberal	James Jenkins	503		
Labour	R.H. Jones*	296		
Majority				
Liberal hold		Swing		

=== Llangennech ===
Llangennech 1925
Party	Candidate	Votes	%	±%
Liberal	D.J. Jones*	unopposed		
Liberal hold		Swing		

=== Llangunnor ===
Llangunnor 1925
Party	Candidate	Votes	%	±%
Liberal	T. Howell Davies*	391		
Liberal	Daniel Rees	320		
Majority				
Liberal hold		Swing		

=== Llanon ===
Llanon 1925
Party	Candidate	Votes	%	±%
Liberal	William Greville*	996		
Labour	John Jones	482		
Majority				
Liberal hold		Swing		

=== Llansawel ===
Llansawel 1925
Party	Candidate	Votes	%	±%
	Evan Harris	unopposed		
		Swing		

=== Llanstephan ===
Llanstephan 1925
Party	Candidate	Votes	%	±%
Liberal	John James Bowen*	unopposed		
Liberal hold		Swing		

=== Llanybyther ===
Llanybyther 1925
Party	Candidate	Votes	%	±%
	E.M. Evans	542		
	D.I. Rees	407		
Majority				
	Liberal hold	Swing		

=== Mothvey ===
Mothvey 1925
Party	Candidate	Votes	%	±%
Liberal	David Davies*	unopposed		
Liberal hold		Swing		

=== Pembrey North ===
Pembrey North 1919
Party	Candidate	Votes	%	±%
	William Rogers	520		
	E.T. Davies	368		
Majority		152		
	Liberal hold	Swing		

=== Pembrey South ===
Pembrey South 1925
Party	Candidate	Votes	%	±%
Labour	John Henry Williams	765		
Liberal	John Eager	388		
Majority				
Labour hold		Swing		

=== Quarter Bach ===
Quarter Bach 1925
Party	Candidate	Votes	%	±%
Labour	Griffith Williams*	982		
Liberal	Gomer Harries	394		
Majority				
Labour hold		Swing		

=== Rhydcymmerai ===
Rhydcymmerai 1925
Party	Candidate	Votes	%	±%
Liberal	Rees Llewellyn Evans*	unopposed		
Liberal hold		Swing		

=== St Clears ===
St Clears 1925
Party	Candidate	Votes	%	±%
Liberal	W.R. Rogers*	unopposed		
Liberal hold		Swing		

=== St Ishmael ===
St Ishmael 1925
Party	Candidate	Votes	%	±%
	Walter Davies	315		
	J. Beynon	307		
	David Thomas	298		
Majority				
	Liberal hold	Swing		

=== Trelech ===
Trelech 1925
Party	Candidate	Votes	%	±%
Liberal	Philip Phillips*	unopposed		
Liberal hold		Swing		

=== Whitland ===
Whitland 1925
Party	Candidate	Votes	%	±%
	T.I. Phillips	398		
	Henry Thomas	363		
Majority		72		
		Swing		

== Election of aldermen ==
In addition to the 53 councillors the council consisted of 17 county aldermen. Aldermen were elected by the council, and served a six-year term. Following the elections the following nine aldermen were elected (with the number of votes in each case).

- John Phillips 48
- Thomas Jones 47
- T.R. Jones 47
- W.N. Jones 47
- John Lloyd 46
- J. Thomas 46
- Rev E.B. Lloyd 45
- Philip Phillips 44
- Tudor Lewis 31

It was suggested that the precedent of electing the local MP, if a member of the Council, be adhered to in the case of Dr J.H. Williams, but Williams gained only 18 votes and was not elected.
