= 1910 Carmarthenshire County Council election =

Welsh local election

All 68 seats to Carmarthenshire County Council 35 seats needed for a majority
	First party	Second party	Third party
Party	Liberal	Conservative	Liberal Unionist
Last election	53/68	13/68	1/68
Seats before	53/68	13/68	1/68
Seats won	51/68	15/68	1/68
Councillors	37	12	1
Aldermen	14	3	0
Seats +/–	▼2	▲2	▼0
	Fourth party
Party	Independent
Last election	1/68
Seats before	1/68
Seats won	1/68
Councillors	1
Aldermen	0
Seats +/–	▼o
Council control after election
Liberal
Liberal Party

The eighth election to the Carmarthenshire County Council was held in March 1910. It was preceded by the 1907 election and followed by the 1913 election.

== Overview of the result ==
The Liberals retained a strong majority although the elections were far less politicized than in previous years. With a few exceptions, members were returned unopposed. The local press did not, on the whole, report the political affiliations of candidates but this was more explicitly noted in the Cardiff-based Weekly Mail.

== Boundary changes ==
There were no boundary changes that occurred.

== Candidates ==
There were only a small number of contested elections with one retiring alderman, John Lewis, seeking election as a councillor.

Three of those elected at the first election in 1889, and who had served continuously since then, sought re-election. Sir James Drummond, C.E. Morris and D.C. Parry (Llanelli) were all returned unopposed.

== Outcome ==
There was very little change in the political complexion of the council.

== The eighth council ==
John Johns (Liberal, Llansteffan) was elected chairman at the 1910 statutoty meeting but died suddenly within the month.

At the June quarterly meeting, the vice-chairman, Alderman John Bevan, Llansadwrn, declined to be nominated for the chair and the Rev. Alfred Fuller-Mills was elected unanimously.

== Ward results ==
=== Abergwili ===
Abergwili 1910
Party	Candidate	Votes	%	±%
Liberal	John Lloyd*	unopposed		
Liberal hold		Swing		

=== Ammanford ===
Ammanford 1910
Party	Candidate	Votes	%	±%
Liberal	Col. David Morris*	unopposed		
Liberal hold		Swing		

=== Bettws ===
Bettws 1910
Party	Candidate	Votes	%	±%
Labour	Tom Morris*	unopposed		
Labour hold		Swing		

=== Caio ===
Caio 1910
Party	Candidate	Votes	%	±%
Conservative	Sir James Hills-Johnes*	unopposed		

=== Carmarthen Eastern Ward (Lower Division) ===
Brigstocke, the member for many years, was defeated.

Carmarthen Eastern Ward (Lower Division) 1910
Party	Candidate	Votes	%	±%
Liberal	Dr Denzil Harries	244		
Independent	T.E. Brigstocke*	240		
Majority		4		
Liberal gain from Independent		Swing		

=== Carmarthen Eastern Ward (Upper Division) ===
Carmarthen Eastern Ward (Upper Division) 1910
Party	Candidate	Votes	%	±%
Liberal	Rev Andrew Fuller-Mills*	Unopposed		
Liberal hold		Swing		

=== Carmarthen Western Ward (Lower Division) ===
Carmarthen Western Ward (Lower Division) 1910
Party	Candidate	Votes	%	±%
Liberal	John Lewis*	157		
Independent	J.B. Arthur	147		
Majority		10		
Liberal hold		Swing		

=== Carmarthen Western Ward (Upper Division) ===
Carmarthen Western Ward (Upper Division) 1910
Party	Candidate	Votes	%	±%
Liberal	H.F. Blagdon-Richards*	unopposed		
Liberal hold		Swing		

=== Cenarth ===
Cenarth 1910
Party	Candidate	Votes	%	±%
Liberal	John Lewis+	261		
	John Bowen	223		
Majority		38		
Liberal hold		Swing		

=== Cilycwm ===
Cilycwm 1910
Party	Candidate	Votes	%	±%
Liberal	Rowland Evan Williams*	231		
	Daniel Lewis	101		
Majority		130		
Liberal hold		Swing		

=== Conwil ===
Conwil 1910
Party	Candidate	Votes	%	±%
Liberal	Thomas Jones*	unopposed		
Liberal hold		Swing		

=== Kidwelly ===
Kidwelly 1910
Party	Candidate	Votes	%	±%
Conservative	Alfred Stephens	322		
	Samuel H. Anthony*	270		
Majority				
gain from		Swing		

=== Laugharne ===
Laugharne 1910
Party	Candidate	Votes	%	±%
Liberal	John D. Morse	243		
Conservative	W.H. Dempster	153		
Majority		90		
Liberal gain from Conservative		Swing		

=== Llanarthney ===
Llanarthney 1910
Party	Candidate	Votes	%	±%
Liberal	W.J. Thomas	382		
Independent	David Farr-Davies	309		
Majority				
Liberal hold		Swing		

=== Llanboidy ===
Llanboidy 1910
Party	Candidate	Votes	%	±%
Liberal	David Evans*	unopposed		
Liberal hold		Swing		

=== Llandebie ===
Llandebie 1910
Party	Candidate	Votes	%	±%
Liberal	David Davies*	453		
	Rev P. Evans	352		
Majority				
Liberal hold		Swing		

=== Llandilo Rural ===
Llandilo Rural 1910
Party	Candidate	Votes	%	±%
Liberal	L.N. Powell*	unopposed		
Liberal hold		Swing		

=== Llandilo Urban ===
Llandilo Urban 1910
Party	Candidate	Votes	%	±%
Liberal	J.W. Gwynne Hughes*	unopposed		
Liberal hold		Swing		

=== Llandovery ===
Llandovery 1910
Party	Candidate	Votes	%	±%
Independent	J.C. Vaughan Pryse-Rice	unopposed		
Independent gain from Liberal		Swing		

=== Llandyssilio ===
Llandyssilio 1910
Party	Candidate	Votes	%	±%
Liberal	Benjamin John*	unopposed		
Liberal hold		Swing		

=== Llanedy ===
Llanedy 1910
Party	Candidate	Votes	%	±%
Liberal	John Jones*	unopposed		
Liberal hold		Swing		

=== Llanegwad ===
Llanegwad 1910
Party	Candidate	Votes	%	±%
Independent	Delme Davies-Evans*	267		
Liberal	Thomas Lewis	246		
Majority		21		
Independent hold		Swing		

=== Llanelly Division 1 ===
Llanelly Division 1 1910
Party	Candidate	Votes	%	±%
Independent	W. Griffiths	unopposed		
Independent hold		Swing		

=== Llanelly Division 2 ===
Llanelly Division 2 1910
Party	Candidate	Votes	%	±%
Labour	John Simlett	260		
	Brinley R. Jones	107		
Majority		153		
Labour hold		Swing		

=== Llanelly Division 3 ===
Llanelly Division 3 1910
Party	Candidate	Votes	%	±%
Liberal	William David*	unopposed		
Liberal hold		Swing		

=== Llanelly Division 4 ===
Llanelly Division 4 1910
Party	Candidate	Votes	%	±%
Liberal	John Thomas*	unopposed		
Liberal hold		Swing		

=== Llanelly Division 5 ===
Llanelly Division 5 1910
Party	Candidate	Votes	%	±%
Liberal	D.C. Parry*	unopposed		
Liberal hold		Swing		

=== Llanelly Division 6 ===
Llanelly Division 6 1910
Party	Candidate	Votes	%	±%
Labour	Joseph Roberts*	unopposed		
Labour hold		Swing		

=== Llanelly Division 7 ===
Llanelly Division 7 1910
Party	Candidate	Votes	%	±%
Liberal	Rev Hugh Jones	unopposed		
Liberal gain from Independent		Swing		

=== Llanelly Division 8 ===
Llanelly Division 8 1910
Party	Candidate	Votes	%	±%
Liberal	Joseph Williams*	unopposed		
Liberal hold		Swing		

=== Llanelly Rural, Berwick ===
Llanelly Rural, Berwick 1910
Party	Candidate	Votes	%	±%
Liberal	David Harry	265		
Liberal	H.J. Hopkins	229		
Majority		36		
Liberal hold		Swing		

=== Llanelly Rural, Hengoed ===
Llanelly Rural, Hengoed 1910
Party	Candidate	Votes	%	±%
Liberal	W.B. Jones*	unopposed		
Liberal hold		Swing		

=== Llanelly Rural, Westfa and Glyn ===
Llanelly Rural, Westfa and Glyn 1910
Party	Candidate	Votes	%	±%
Liberal	Rev Benjamin Humphreys*	unopposed		
Liberal hold		Swing		

=== Llanfihangel Aberbythick ===
Llanfihangel Aberbythick 1910
Party	Candidate	Votes	%	±%
Conservative	Earl Cawdor*	Unopposed	N/A	N/A
Conservative hold				

=== Llanfihangel-ar-Arth ===
Llanfihangel-ar-Arth 1910
Party	Candidate	Votes	%	±%
Conservative	Thomas Rees Jones	248		
Liberal	Thomas Barrett*	198		
Majority		50		
Conservative gain from Liberal		Swing		

=== Llangadock ===
Llangadock 1910
Party	Candidate	Votes	%	±%
Conservative	Mervyn Lloyd Peel*	unopposed		
Conservative hold		Swing		

=== Llangeler ===
Llangeler 1910
Party	Candidate	Votes	%	±%
Conservative	Thomas Thomas	318		
	David Jones	314		
Majority				
Conservative hold		Swing		

=== Llangendeirne ===
Llangendeirne 1910
Party	Candidate	Votes	%	±%
Liberal	Rev R.H. Jones	unopposed		
Liberal hold		Swing		

=== Llangennech ===
Llangennech 1910
Party	Candidate	Votes	%	±%
Liberal	Thomas Thomas*	unopposed		
Liberal hold		Swing		

=== Llangunnor ===
Llangunnor 1910
Party	Candidate	Votes	%	±%
Liberal	C.E. Morris*	unopposed		
Liberal hold		Swing		

=== Llanon ===
Llanon 1910
Party	Candidate	Votes	%	±%
Liberal	William Greville*	unopposed		
Liberal hold		Swing		

=== Llansawel ===
Llansawel 1910
Party	Candidate	Votes	%	±%
Conservative	Sir J.H.W. Drummond, Bart.*	Unopposed	N/A	N/A
Conservative hold				

=== Llanstephan ===
Llanstephan 1910
Party	Candidate	Votes	%	±%
Liberal	John Johns*	unopposed		
Liberal hold		Swing		

=== Llanybyther ===
Llanybyther 1910
Party	Candidate	Votes	%	±%
Liberal	David Williams*	unopposed		
Liberal hold		Swing		

=== Mothvey ===
Mothvey 1910
Party	Candidate	Votes	%	±%
Liberal	David Davies*	unopposed		
Liberal hold		Swing		

=== Pembrey North ===
Pembrey North 1910
Party	Candidate	Votes	%	±%
Liberal	Thomas Evans Davies	301		
Liberal	Rev J.H. Rees*	301		
Majority				
Liberal hold		Swing		

=== Pembrey South ===
Pembrey South 1910
Party	Candidate	Votes	%	±%
Independent	George Eynon Bowen*	406		
Liberal	Richard Thomas Hammond	332		
Majority				
Independent hold		Swing		

=== Quarter Bach ===
Quarter Bach 1910
Party	Candidate	Votes	%	±%
Liberal	W.J. Williams*	unopposed		
Liberal hold		Swing		

=== Rhydcymmerai ===
Rhydcymmerai 1910
Party	Candidate	Votes	%	±%
Liberal	Benjamin Evans*	unopposed		
Liberal hold		Swing		

=== St Clears ===
St Clears 1910
Party	Candidate	Votes	%	±%
Liberal	James Phillips*	unopposed		
Liberal hold		Swing		

=== St Ishmael ===
St Ishmael 1910
Party	Candidate	Votes	%	±%
Liberal	John Lloyd Thomas*	unopposed		
Liberal hold		Swing		

=== Trelech ===
Trelech 1910
Party	Candidate	Votes	%	±%
Liberal	William Thomas*	unopposed		
Liberal hold		Swing		

=== Whitland ===
Whitland 1910
Party	Candidate	Votes	%	±%
Independent	Dr R.L. Thomas*	unopposed		
Independent hold		Swing		

== Election of aldermen ==
In addition to the 51 councillors the council consisted of 17 county aldermen. Aldermen were elected by the council, and served a six-year term.

Following the elections the following eight retiring aldermen were re-elected:

- John Williams,
- W.N. Jones,
- D.L. Jones,
- R.W. Stephens,
- John Rees,
- Thomas Jones,
- Rev Thomas Johns,
- Rev William Davies,

One new alderman was elected

- John Lloyd, elected member for Abergwili

One retiring alderman successfully sought election as a councillor and was not re-elected as alderman:

- John Lewis

All nine aldermen elected were Liberals.

== By-elections between 1910 and 1913 ==
=== Llansteffan by-election 1910 ===
A by-election was held in May 1910 following the sudden death of John Johns, chairman of the council. His son, Walter Johns was initially nominated but withdrew in favour of another Liberal.

Llansteffan 1910
Party	Candidate	Votes	%	±%
Liberal	G. Barrett Evans	216		
Conservative	Walter Thomas	183		
Majority		33		
Liberal hold		Swing		

=== Llangeler by-election 1911 ===
A by-election was held on 6 May 1911 following the death of Conservative councillor, Thomas Thomas. Colonel Lewes of llysnewydd was selected in his place and won a comfortable victory over the Liberal candidate.

Llangeler by-election 1911
Party	Candidate	Votes	%	±%
Conservative	Capt. William Lewes	411		
Liberal	Rev D. Geler Jones	259		
Majority		152		
Conservative hold		Swing		
