= 1913 Carmarthenshire County Council election =

Welsh local election

All 68 seats to Carmarthenshire County Council 35 seats needed for a majority
	First party	Second party	Third party
Party	Liberal	Conservative	Liberal Unionist
Last election	53/68	13/68	1/68
Seats before	53/68	13/68	1/68
Seats won	51/68	15/68	1/68
Councillors	37	12	1
Aldermen	14	3	0
Seats +/–	▼2	▲2	▼0
	Fourth party
Party	Independent
Last election	1/68
Seats before	1/68
Seats won	1/68
Councillors	1
Aldermen	0
Seats +/–	▼o
Council control after election
Liberal
Liberal Party

The ninth election to the Carmarthenshire County Council was held in March 1913. It was preceded by the 1910 election and followed, due to the First World War and the postponement of the 1916 elections, by the 1919 election.

== Overview of the result ==
The Liberals retained a strong majority although the elections were far less politicized than in previous years. With a few exceptions, members were returned unopposed.

== Boundary changes ==
There were no boundary changes.

== Candidates ==
Only two of those elected at the first election in 1889, and who had served continuously since then, sought re-election. Sir James Drummond, the Lord Lieutenant of Carmarthenshire and D.C. Parry (Llanelli) were both returned unopposed.

== Division results ==
=== Abergwili ===
Abergwili 1913
Party	Candidate	Votes	%	±%
Liberal	John Griffiths*	unopposed		
Liberal hold		Swing		

=== Ammanford ===
Ammanford 1913
Party	Candidate	Votes	%	±%
Liberal	Col. David Morris*	unopposed		
Liberal hold		Swing		

=== Bettws ===
Bettws 1913
Party	Candidate	Votes	%	±%
Labour	Tom Morris*	503		
Liberal	Henry Folland	285		
Liberal	Arthur Williams	142		
Majority		218		
Labour hold		Swing		

=== Caio ===
Caio 1913
Party	Candidate	Votes	%	±%
Conservative	Sir James Hills-Johnes*	unopposed		

=== Carmarthen Eastern Ward (Lower Division) ===
Carmarthen Eastern Ward (Lower Division) 1913
Party	Candidate	Votes	%	±%
Liberal	Dr David Denzil Harries*	unopposed		
Liberal hold		Swing		

=== Carmarthen Eastern Ward (Upper Division) ===
Carmarthen Eastern Ward (Upper Division) 1913
Party	Candidate	Votes	%	±%
Liberal	Rev Andrew Fuller-Mills*	Unopposed		
Liberal hold		Swing		

=== Carmarthen Western Ward (Lower Division) ===
Carmarthen Western Ward (Lower Division) 1913
Party	Candidate	Votes	%	±%
Conservative	H.S. Holmes	152		
Liberal	John Lewis*	136		
Majority		16		
Conservative gain from Liberal		Swing		

=== Carmarthen Western Ward (Upper Division) ===
Carmarthen Western Ward (Upper Division) 1913
Party	Candidate	Votes	%	±%
Liberal	H.F. Blagdon-Richards*	268		
Conservative	John Crossman	243		
Majority		25		
Liberal hold		Swing		

=== Cenarth ===
Cenarth 1913
Party	Candidate	Votes	%	±%
Liberal	John Lewis*	261		
Conservative	David Evans	231		
Majority		30		
Liberal hold		Swing		

=== Cilycwm ===
Cilycwm 1913
Party	Candidate	Votes	%	±%
Conservative	J. Campbell-Davys	246		
Liberal	Daniel Lewis	99		
Majority		147		
Conservative gain from Liberal		Swing		

=== Conwil ===
Conwil 1913
Party	Candidate	Votes	%	±%
Liberal	Thomas Jones*	unopposed		
Liberal hold		Swing		

=== Kidwelly ===
Kidwelly 1913
Party	Candidate	Votes	%	±%
Conservative	Alfred Stephens*	unopposed		
Conservative hold		Swing		

=== Laugharne ===
Laugharne 1913
Party	Candidate	Votes	%	±%
Conservative	W.H. Dempster	223		
Liberal	T.S.K. Morse	184		
Majority		39		
Conservative gain from Liberal		Swing		

=== Llanarthney ===
Llanarthney 1913
Party	Candidate	Votes	%	±%
Liberal	W. Jones Thomas*	unopposed		
Liberal hold		Swing		

=== Llanboidy ===
Llanboidy 1913
Party	Candidate	Votes	%	±%
Liberal	David Evans*	unopposed		
Liberal hold		Swing		

=== Llandebie ===
Llandebie 1913
Party	Candidate	Votes	%	±%
Liberal	David Davies*	Unopposed		
Liberal hold		Swing		

=== Llandilo Rural ===
Llandilo Rural 1913
Party	Candidate	Votes	%	±%
Liberal	L.N. Powell*	unopposed		
Liberal hold		Swing		

=== Llandilo Urban ===
Llandilo Urban 1913
Party	Candidate	Votes	%	±%
Liberal	J.W. Gwynne Hughes*	unopposed		
Liberal hold		Swing		

=== Llandovery ===
Llandovery 1913
Party	Candidate	Votes	%	±%
Independent	J.P. Carbery Vaughan Pryse-Rice*	unopposed		
Independent hold		Swing		

=== Llandyssilio ===
Llandyssilio 1913
Party	Candidate	Votes	%	±%
Liberal	Benjamin John*	unopposed		
Liberal hold		Swing		

=== Llanedy ===
Llanedy 1910
Party	Candidate	Votes	%	±%
Liberal	John Jones*	unopposed		
Liberal hold		Swing		

=== Llanegwad ===
Llanegwad 1913
Party	Candidate	Votes	%	±%
Independent	Delme Davies-Evans*	unopposed		
Independent hold		Swing		

=== Llanelly Division 1 ===
Llanelly Division 1 1913
Party	Candidate	Votes	%	±%
Independent	William Griffiths	unopposed		
Independent hold		Swing		

=== Llanelly Division 2 ===
Llanelly Division 2 1913
Party	Candidate	Votes	%	±%
Labour	John Simlett*	unopposed		
Labour hold		Swing		

=== Llanelly Division 3 ===
Llanelly Division 3 1910
Party	Candidate	Votes	%	±%
Liberal	William David*	unopposed		
Liberal hold		Swing		

=== Llanelly Division 4 ===
Llanelly Division 4 1913
Party	Candidate	Votes	%	±%
Liberal	John Thomas*	unopposed		
Liberal hold		Swing		

=== Llanelly Division 5 ===
Llanelly Division 5 1913
Party	Candidate	Votes	%	±%
Liberal	D.C. Parry*	unopposed		
Liberal hold		Swing		

=== Llanelly Division 6 ===
Llanelly Division 6 1913
Party	Candidate	Votes	%	±%
Labour	Joseph Roberts*	unopposed		
Labour hold		Swing		

=== Llanelly Division 7 ===
Llanelly Division 7 1913
Party	Candidate	Votes	%	±%
Liberal	Rev Hugh Jones*	unopposed		
Liberal hold		Swing		

=== Llanelly Division 8 ===
Llanelly Division 8 1910
Party	Candidate	Votes	%	±%
Liberal	Joseph Williams*	unopposed		
Liberal hold		Swing		

=== Llanelly Rural, Berwick ===
Llanelly Rural, Berwick 1913
Party	Candidate	Votes	%	±%
Liberal	David Hughes	299		
Liberal	David Harry*	289		
Majority		10		
Liberal hold		Swing		

=== Llanelly Rural, Hengoed ===
Llanelly Rural, Hengoed 1913
Party	Candidate	Votes	%	±%
Liberal	W.B. Jones*	unopposed		
Liberal hold		Swing		

=== Llanelly Rural, Westfa and Glyn ===
Llanelly Rural, Westfa and Glyn 1913
Party	Candidate	Votes	%	±%
Liberal	Rev Benjamin Humphreys	unopposed		
Liberal hold		Swing		

=== Llanfihangel Aberbythick ===
Llanfihangel Aberbythick 1913
Party	Candidate	Votes	%	±%
Liberal	William Harris	unopposed		
Liberal gain from Conservative		Swing		

=== Llanfihangel-ar-Arth ===
Llanfihangel-ar-Arth 1907
Party	Candidate	Votes	%	±%
Conservative	Thomas Rees Jones	261		
Liberal	Ben Rees	170		
Majority		91		
Conservative hold		Swing		

=== Llangadock ===
Llangadock 1913
Party	Candidate	Votes	%	±%
Conservative	Mervyn Lloyd Peel*	unopposed		
Conservative hold		Swing		

=== Llangeler ===
Llangeler 1913
Party	Candidate	Votes	%	±%
Conservative	William Lewes*	360		
Liberal	Rev Edward Teilo Owen	320		
Majority		40		
Conservative hold		Swing		

=== Llangendeirne ===
Llangendeirne 1913
Party	Candidate	Votes	%	±%
Liberal	Rev R.H. Jones	273		
Liberal	Rev Ben Morris	238		
Majority		35		
Liberal hold		Swing		

=== Llangennech ===
Llangennech 1913
Party	Candidate	Votes	%	±%
Liberal	Thomas Thomas*	unopposed		
Liberal hold		Swing		

=== Llangunnor ===
Llangunnor 1913
Party	Candidate	Votes	%	±%
Liberal	Rev Evan B. Lloyd	unopposed		
Liberal hold		Swing		

=== Llanon ===
Llanon 1913
Party	Candidate	Votes	%	±%
Liberal	William Greville*	unopposed		
Liberal hold		Swing		

=== Llansawel ===
Llansawel 1913
Party	Candidate	Votes	%	±%
Conservative	Sir J.H.W. Drummond, Bart.*	Unopposed	N/A	N/A
Conservative hold				

=== Llanstephan ===
Llanstephan 1913
Party	Candidate	Votes	%	±%
Liberal	John Johns*	unopposed		
Liberal hold		Swing		

=== Llanybyther ===
Llanybyther 1913
Party	Candidate	Votes	%	±%
Liberal	Thomas Jones	334		
Liberal	Dr E. Jones	240		
Liberal hold		Swing		

=== Mothvey ===
Mothvey 1913
Party	Candidate	Votes	%	±%
Liberal	David Davies*	unopposed		
Liberal hold		Swing		

=== Pembrey North ===
Pembrey North 1913
Party	Candidate	Votes	%	±%
Liberal	Rev James Howell Rees*	302		
Liberal	David Evans	227		
Conservative	William Bassett	184		
Majority		75		
Liberal hold		Swing		

=== Pembrey South ===
Pembrey South 1913
Party	Candidate	Votes	%	±%
Labour	Dr John Henry Williams	390		
Independent	George Eynon Bowen*	202		
Majority		188		
Labour gain from Independent		Swing		

=== Quarter Bach ===
Quarter Bach 1913
Party	Candidate	Votes	%	±%
Liberal	W.J. Williams*	unopposed		
Liberal hold		Swing		

=== Rhydcymmerai ===
Rhydcymmerai 1910
Party	Candidate	Votes	%	±%
Liberal	Benjamin Evans*	unopposed		
Liberal hold		Swing		

=== St Clears ===
St Clears 1910
Party	Candidate	Votes	%	±%
Liberal	James Phillips*	unopposed		
Liberal hold		Swing		

=== St Ishmael ===
St Ishmael 1913
Party	Candidate	Votes	%	±%
Liberal	John Lloyd Thomas*	unopposed		
Liberal hold		Swing		

=== Trelech ===
Trelech 1913
Party	Candidate	Votes	%	±%
Liberal	Philip Phillips	unopposed		
Liberal hold		Swing		

=== Whitland ===
Whitland 1913
Party	Candidate	Votes	%	±%
Liberal	William Thomas	228		
Conservative	Dr R.L. Thomas*	184		
Majority		44		
Liberal gain from Conservative		Swing		

== Election of aldermen ==
In addition to the 51 councillors the council consisted of 17 county aldermen. Aldermen were elected by the council, and served a six-year term. At the statutory meeting there was disagreement over the election of aldermen with the Liberals initially nominating eight of their number for the eight vacancies. However, W.J. Williams of Brynamman withdrew in favour of a Conservative, Dudley Drummond.

Following the elections the following eight aldermen were elected:

- H. Jones-Thomas, retiring alderman (47)
- J. Llew. Thomas, retiring alderman (45)
- W. Mabon Davies, retiring alderman (44)
- Thomas Thomas, retiring alderman. (45)
- Dudley Drummond, from outside the council (48)
- Professor Jones, retiring alderman (47)
- C. E. Morris, retiring alderman (43)
- John Lewis, elected member for Cenarth (40)

== Aldermanic vacancies between 1913 and 1919 ==
Both W. Mabon Davies and Professor D.E. Jones died in the months following the election and the appointment of new aldermen in their place took place at the quarterly meeting of the council in late July. Several members objected to aspects of the process, including the perceived lack of aldermen from some parts of the county and the private meetings to decide upon nominations (from which Conservative councillors were said to be excluded). After a prolonged discussion it was decided to postpone the decision on a replacement for Professor Jones.

W. Mabon Davies was replaced by a member who had withdrawn his name at the annual meeting some months previously.

- W.J. Williams (Liberal), elected member for Quarter Bach

At the October quarterly meeting there was disagreement among members for the western division over a replacement for Professor Jones. The successful candidate received 28 votes as opposed to 18 for the Rev. J.H. Rees and 10 for the Rev. Arthur Fuller-Mills of Carmarthen.

- Ben Evans (Liberal), elected member for Rhydymcerau

== By-elections between 1913 and 1919 ==
=== Ammanford by-election, 1913 ===
A by-election was held in the Ammanford division in June 1913 following the death of Councillor David Morris, a Liberal councillor. Erne Hewlett, general manager of Ammanford Collieries, and an active Conservative, ran on a non-political basis and won the seat, despite Liberal attempts to make the contest a political one.

Ammanford by-election 1913
Party	Candidate	Votes	%	±%
Independent	Erne Hewlett			
Liberal	David Griffiths Davies			
Majority				
Turnout				
Independent gain from Liberal		Swing		

=== Quarter Bach by-election, 1913 ===
A by-election was held in the Quarter Bach division on 5 September 1913 following the elevation of W.J. Williams to the aldermanic bench.

Quarter Bach by-election 1913
Party	Candidate	Votes	%	±%
Liberal	Gwilym Vaughan	430		
Liberal	D.W. Lewis	252		
Majority				
Turnout				
Liberal hold		Swing		
