= 1922 Carmarthenshire County Council election =

Welsh local election

All 53 seats to Carmarthenshire County Council 27 seats needed for a majority
	First party	Second party	Third party
Party	Liberal	Conservative	Labour
Seats won	0/53	0/53	0/53
	Fourth party	Fifth party
Party	Independent	Liberal Unionist
Seats won	1/51	0/51
Council control after election
TBD

An election to the Carmarthenshire County Council was held in March 1922. It was preceded by the 1919 election and followed by the 1925 election.

== Overview of the result ==
The election saw a reduction in the number of candidates openly supporting the Liberal Party as an increasing number stood as Independents. Labour continued to gain some ground in the Llanelli and Ammanford districts.

== Boundary changes ==
There were no boundary changes.

== Unopposed returns ==
22 of the 53 divisions were uncontested, with the majority of the unopposed returns being in the rural parts of the county.

== Contested elections ==
Contests in Llanelli town and in the surrounding areas saw a significant campaign by the Labour Party, but its success remained limited.

== Retiring aldermen ==
The aldermen who retired at the election were

== Division results ==
=== Abergwili ===
Abergwili 1922
Party	Candidate	Votes	%	±%
Conservative	William Williams	290		
Liberal	John Williams	265		
	David Williams	165		
Majority				
Conservative gain from Liberal		Swing		

=== Ammanford ===
Ammanford 1922
Party	Candidate	Votes	%	±%
Labour	David George*	unopposed		
Labour hold		Swing		

=== Bettws ===
Bettws 1922
Party	Candidate	Votes	%	±%
Labour	Tom Morris**	unopposed		
Labour hold		Swing		

=== Caio ===
Caio 1922
Party	Candidate	Votes	%	±%
	Isaac Williams	324		
	Mabel Davies*	282		
Majority				
	Independent hold	Swing		

=== Carmarthen Eastern Ward (Lower Division) ===
Carmarthen Eastern Ward (Lower Division) 1922
Party	Candidate	Votes	%	±%
Liberal	David Denzil Harries*	unopposed		
Liberal hold		Swing		

=== Carmarthen Eastern Ward (Upper Division) ===
Carmarthen Eastern Ward (Upper Division) 1922
Party	Candidate	Votes	%	±%
Independent	Lewis David Thomas	unopposed		
Independent gain from Other parties				

=== Carmarthen Western Ward (Lower Division) ===
Carmarthen Western Ward (Lower Division) 1922
Party	Candidate	Votes	%	±%
Conservative	H.S. Holmes*	unopposed		
Conservative hold		Swing		

=== Carmarthen Western Ward (Upper Division) ===
Carmarthen Western Ward (Upper Division) 1922
Party	Candidate	Votes	%	±%
Liberal	William Price Williams	583		
Independent	Thomas Jenkins	295		
Majority				
Liberal hold		Swing		

=== Cenarth ===
Cenarth 1919
Party	Candidate	Votes	%	±%
Liberal	D.C. Lloyd	unopposed		
Liberal hold		Swing		

=== Cilycwm ===
Cilycwm 1922
Party	Candidate	Votes	%	±%
Conservative	Ivor Elystan Campbell-Davys*	unopposed		
Conservative hold		Swing		

=== Conwil ===
Conwil 1922
Party	Candidate	Votes	%	±%
Liberal	Thomas Phillips*	unopposed		
Liberal hold		Swing		

=== Kidwelly ===
Kidwelly 1922
Party	Candidate	Votes	%	±%
Conservative	Alfred Stephens*	unopposed		
Conservative hold		Swing		

=== Laugharne ===
Laugharne 1922
Party	Candidate	Votes	%	±%
Liberal	T.S.K. Morse	unopposed		
Liberal hold		Swing		

=== Llanarthney ===
Llanarthney 1922
Party	Candidate	Votes	%	±%
Liberal	David Stephens	unopposed		
Liberal hold		Swing		

=== Llanboidy ===
Llanboidy 1922
Party	Candidate	Votes	%	±%
Liberal	William Thomas*	unopposed		
Liberal hold		Swing		

=== Llandebie ===
Llandebie 1922
Party	Candidate	Votes	%	±%
Labour	D.B. Lewis	955		
Liberal	D.W. Thomas	870		
Majority				
Labour gain from Liberal		Swing		

=== Llandilo Rural ===
Llandilo Rural 1922
Party	Candidate	Votes	%	±%
Liberal	L.N. Powell*	unopposed		
Liberal hold		Swing		

=== Llandilo Urban ===
Llandilo Urban 1922
Party	Candidate	Votes	%	±%
Conservative	Lord Dynevor*	Unopposed	N/A	N/A
Conservative hold				

=== Llandovery ===
Llandovery 1922
Party	Candidate	Votes	%	±%
Liberal	Harry Vaughan Watkins*	unopposed		
Liberal hold		Swing		

=== Llandyssilio ===
Llandyssilio 1922
Party	Candidate	Votes	%	±%
Liberal		unopposed		
Liberal hold		Swing		

=== Llanedy ===
Llanedy 1922
Party	Candidate	Votes	%	±%
Labour	T.J. Parry-Jones*	629		
	G. Evans	520		
Majority				
Labour hold		Swing		

=== Llanegwad ===
Llanegwad 1922
Party	Candidate	Votes	%	±%
Independent	William David Davies	unopposed		
Independent hold		Swing		

=== Llanelly Division 1 ===
Llanelly Division 1 1922
Party	Candidate	Votes	%	±%
Independent	Daniel Roberts	676		
Independent	Lady Howard*	247		
Majority				
Independent hold		Swing		

=== Llanelly Division 2 ===
Llanelly Division 2 1922
Party	Candidate	Votes	%	±%
Independent	H. Hayton Williams	478		
Liberal	William David*	408		
Majority				
Independent gain from Liberal		Swing		

=== Llanelly Division 3 ===
Llanelly Division 3 1922
Party	Candidate	Votes	%	±%
Independent	Joseph Roberts	563		
Labour	J.R. Jones*	194		
Majority				
Independent gain from Labour		Swing		

=== Llanelly Division 4 ===
Llanelly Division 4 1922
Party	Candidate	Votes	%	±%
Independent	John Thomas*	669		
Labour	D.T. Jones	307		
Majority				
Independent hold		Swing		

=== Llanelly Division 5 ===
Llanelly Division 5 1922
Party	Candidate	Votes	%	±%
Independent	Gwen Trubshaw	438		
Labour	T.D.J. Dolling	206		
Majority				
Independent hold		Swing		

=== Llanelly Division 6 ===
Llanelly Division 6 1922
Party	Candidate	Votes	%	±%
Labour	Thomas Williams*	500		
Independent	T.P. Jones	452		
Majority				
Labour hold		Swing		

=== Llanelly Division 7 ===
Llanelly Division 7 1922
Party	Candidate	Votes	%	±%
Independent	W. Powell Rees	731		
Independent	Hugh Jones*	396		
Majority				
Independent hold		Swing		

=== Llanelly Division 8 ===
Llanelly Division 8 1922
Party	Candidate	Votes	%	±%
Independent	William Davies	512		
Labour	H.W. Bowen*	403		
Majority				
Independent gain from Labour		Swing		

=== Llanelly Rural, Berwick ===
Llanelly Rural, Berwick 1922
Party	Candidate	Votes	%	±%
Independent	David Harry*	659		
Labour	William Morgan	313		
Majority		346		
Independent hold		Swing		

=== Llanelly Rural, Hengoed ===
Llanelly Rural, Hengoed 1922
Party	Candidate	Votes	%	±%
Labour	Joseph Howells	499		
Independent	David John*	450		
Majority				
Labour gain from Independent		Swing		

=== Llanelly Rural, Westfa and Glyn ===
Llanelly Rural, Westfa and Glyn 1922
Party	Candidate	Votes	%	±%
Labour	William Jones*	unopposed		
Labour hold		Swing		

=== Llanfihangel Aberbythick ===
Llanfihangel Aberbythick 1922
Party	Candidate	Votes	%	±%
Liberal	Thomas Thomas*	359		
Liberal	William Harris	319		
Majority				
Liberal hold		Swing		

=== Llanfihangel-ar-Arth ===
Llanfihangel-ar-Arth 1922
Party	Candidate	Votes	%	±%
Conservative	Thomas Rees Jones*	unopposed		
Conservative hold		Swing		

=== Llangadock ===
Llangadock 1922
Party	Candidate	Votes	%	±%
Liberal	Walter Tudor Lewis*	unopposed		
Liberal hold		Swing		

=== Llangeler ===
Llangeler 1922
Party	Candidate	Votes	%	±%
Conservative	Henry Jones	804		
Liberal	Robert G. Owen	408		
Majority		396		
Conservative hold		Swing		

=== Llangendeirne ===
Llangendeirne 1922
Party	Candidate	Votes	%	±%
Liberal	R.H. Jones	408		
Labour	Thomas Jones	377		
Majority		31		
Liberal hold		Swing		

=== Llangennech ===
Llangennech 1922
Party	Candidate	Votes	%	±%
Liberal	D.J. Jones*	481		
Labour	Philip Foster Owen	327		
Majority				
Liberal hold		Swing		

=== Llangunnor ===
Llangunnor 1922
Party	Candidate	Votes	%	±%
Liberal	T. Howell Davies	371		
Liberal	John Richards*	282		
Majority				
Liberal hold		Swing		

=== Llanon ===
Llanon 1922
Party	Candidate	Votes	%	±%
Liberal	William Greville*	unopposed		
Liberal hold		Swing		

=== Llansawel ===
Llansawel 1922
Party	Candidate	Votes	%	±%
	Evan Harris	277		
	Thomas Evans*	145		
Majority				
		Swing		

=== Llanstephan ===
Llanstephan 1922
Party	Candidate	Votes	%	±%
Liberal	J.J. Bowen	353		
Liberal	G. Barrett Evans*	328		
Majority				
Liberal hold		Swing		

=== Llanybyther ===
Llanybyther 1922
Party	Candidate	Votes	%	±%
Liberal	John Edward Lloyd	334		
Conservative	Lady Mansel	240		
Majority				
Liberal hold		Swing		

=== Mothvey ===
Mothvey 1922
Party	Candidate	Votes	%	±%
Liberal	David Davies*	unopposed		
Liberal hold		Swing		

=== Pembrey North ===
Pembrey North 1922
Party	Candidate	Votes	%	±%
Liberal	William Rogers	520		
	E.T. Davies	368		
Majority		152		
Liberal hold		Swing		

=== Pembrey South ===
Pembrey South 1922
Party	Candidate	Votes	%	±%
Labour	John Henry Williams	Unopposed	N/A	N/A
Labour hold				

=== Quarter Bach ===
Quarter Bach 1922
Party	Candidate	Votes	%	±%
Labour	Griffith Williams*	unopposed		
Labour hold		Swing		

=== Rhydcymmerai ===
Rhydcymmerai 1922
Party	Candidate	Votes	%	±%
	Rees Llewellyn Evans	333		
	David Samuel Jones	158		
Majority				
	Liberal hold	Swing		

=== St Clears ===
St Clears 1922
Party	Candidate	Votes	%	±%
Liberal	W.R. Rogers*	unopposed		
Liberal hold		Swing		

=== St Ishmael ===
St Ishmael 1922
Party	Candidate	Votes	%	±%
Liberal	John Jones*	unopposed		
Liberal hold		Swing		

=== Trelech ===
Trelech 1922
Party	Candidate	Votes	%	±%
Liberal	Philip Phillips*	unopposed		
Liberal hold		Swing		

=== Whitland ===
Whitland 1922
Party	Candidate	Votes	%	±%
	R.L. Thomas	391		
	Thomas Phillips	319		
Majority		72		
		Swing		

== Election of aldermen ==
In addition to the 53 councillors the council consisted of 17 county aldermen. Aldermen were elected by the council, and served a six-year term, and from the formation of the council aldermen had not been obliged to face an election before being re-appointed.

Some Welsh councils, notably Glamorgan, had required aldermen to seek re-election and demands for a similar process in Carmarthenshire had been made from time to time. At a private meeting of the council held on 9 March it was resolved that, in future, retiring aldermen in Carmarthenshire would be required to seek re-election. It was, however, decided that this policy would not be immediately implemented as retiring aldermen had not been given sufficient notice. Only one of the retiring members, namely Tom Morris, the Labour member for Betws, has sought election (and had been returned unopposed).

At the statutory meeting held on 16 March, a list on names selected by the western and eastern members respectively were submitted. L.D. Thomas, the Mayor of Carmarthen and a new member, protested against this approach but the majority of councillors overwhelmingly supported the nine nominations.

Consequently, the following eight aldermen were elected (with the number of votes in each case).

- Thomas Thomas, retiring alderman (45)
- Tom Morris, retiring alderman (43)
- H Jones-Thomas, retiring alderman (43)
- W.J. Williams, retiring alderman (43)
- Ben Evans, retiring alderman (42)
- F.D.W. Williams-Drummond, retiring alderman (39)
- H.E. Blagdon-Richards, retiring alderman (35)
- John Lewis, retiring alderman
