= Dyfed County Council =

Welsh local governing body (1974–1996)

Dyfed County Council Cyngor Sir Dyfed

History
- Founded: 1 April 1974
- Disbanded: 31 March 1996
- Preceded by: Cardiganshire County Council Carmarthenshire County Council Pembrokeshire County Council
- Succeeded by: Ceredigion; Carmarthenshire; Pembrokeshire

Elections
- First election: April 1973
- Last election: May 1993
- Next election: N/A

Meeting place
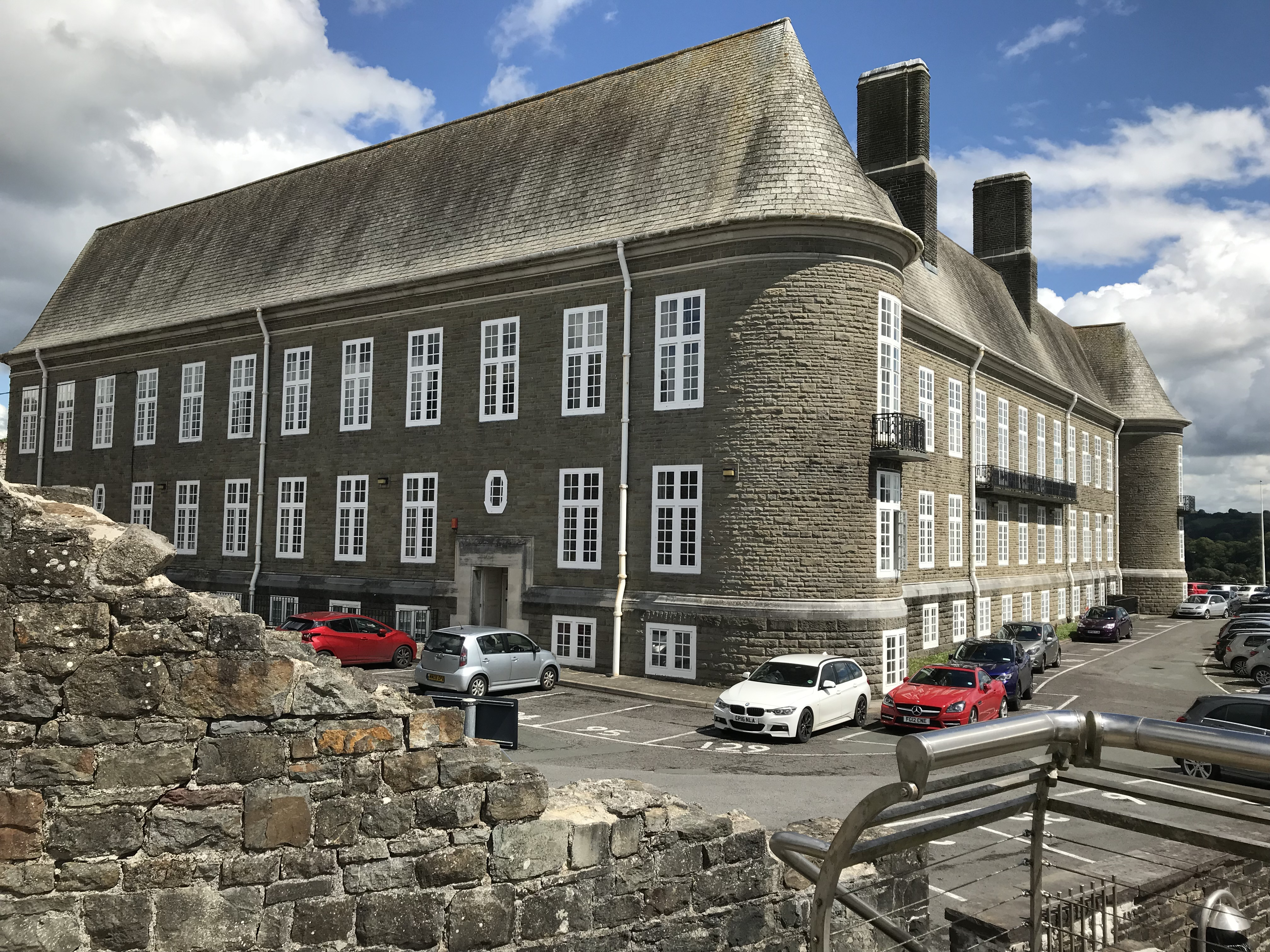
- County Hall, Carmarthen

Dyfed County Council (Welsh: Cyngor Sir Dyfed) was the county council of the county of Dyfed in south west Wales. It operated between 1974 and 1996. The county council was based at County Hall, Carmarthen.

== History ==
Dyfed County Council was created on 1 April 1974 under the Local Government Act 1972. It took over the functions of the three previous county councils which had covered the area: Cardiganshire, Carmarthenshire, and Pembrokeshire.

Dyfed County Council was abolished under the Local Government (Wales) Act 1994, being replaced on 1 April 1996 by three unitary authorities: Carmarthenshire County Council, Ceredigion County Council, and Pembrokeshire County Council. These corresponded to the former counties which had been abolished 22 years earlier. The area of Dyfed became a preserved county, being used for some ceremonial purposes, but no longer having a county council.

== Political control ==
The first election to the county council was held in April 1973, initially operating as a shadow authority alongside the outgoing authorities until it came into its powers on 1 April 1974. The vast majority of the councillors elected in 1973 were members of one of the three previous county councils. At the 1977 election, Plaid Cymru gained some ground although not to the extent that was seen in parts of the South Wales valleys in that year. Political control of the council from 1974 until its abolition in 1996 was as follows:

Party in control	Years
Independent	1974–1981
No overall control	1981–1996

== Elections ==
- 1973 Dyfed County Council election
- 1977 Dyfed County Council election
- 1981 Dyfed County Council election
- 1985 Dyfed County Council election
- 1989 Dyfed County Council election
- 1993 Dyfed County Council election

== Premises ==
The council inherited several offices from its three predecessor county councils, including the three former county councils' main offices, being Swyddfa'r Sir in Aberystwyth from Cardiganshire, County Hall, Carmarthen from Carmarthenshire, and the County Offices on St Thomas Green in Haverfordwest from Pembrokeshire. County Hall in Carmarthen served as Dyfed County Council's headquarters throughout its existence, with the other offices serving as area offices.
