= Dyfed =

Preserved county of Wales

Coordinates: 51.94°N 4.51°W

- Dyfed shown as a preserved county since 2003
- Area
  - 1974: 5,766 km^{2}
  - 2024: 5,774 km²
- Population
  - 1971: 316,369
  - 1992: 351,100 (estimate)
  - 2024: 389,160
- History
  - Origin: Kingdom of Dyfed
  - Created: 1974
  - Abolished: 1996
  - Succeeded by: Carmarthenshire, Ceredigion, Pembrokeshire; Preserved county of Dyfed
- Status: Non-metropolitan county (1974–1996) Preserved county (1996–)
- Government: Dyfed County Council
  - HQ: County Hall, Carmarthen

Dyfed (Welsh pronunciation: [ˈdəvɛd]) is a preserved county in southwestern Wales, covering the modern counties Carmarthenshire, Ceredigion and Pembrokeshire. It is mostly rural area with a coastline on the Irish Sea and the Bristol Channel. Between 1974 and 1996, Dyfed was an administrative county of Wales, with its council based at Carmarthen. Dyfed continues to give name to public services including Dyfed-Powys Police and Dyfed Telecom.

== Etymology ==
The name Dyfed is an ancient one, appearing in the Mabinogion with a history predating that work. It is derived from Demetae (the Iron Age tribe that inhabited the area), with this tribal name deriving from a Celtic element related to the Welsh language word defaid (sheep) as well as the Common Brittonic word defod (wealth, property or riches). This suggests that the area that became Dyfed was noted for the cultivation of sheep from ancient times, and that this was associated with great wealth. The name persisted in the post-Roman Kingdom of Dyfed (clearly a continuation of this pre-Roman etymon) and even survived the Norman conquest of Wales and the introduction of the Shire system, with Thomas Morgan noting that the Welsh inhabitants of Pembrokeshire still referred to the area as Dyfed in the nineteenth century.

== History ==
Dyfed is a preserved county of Wales. It was originally created as an administrative county council on 1 April 1974 under the terms of the Local Government Act 1972, and covered approximately the same geographic extent as the ancient Principality of Deheubarth, although excluding the Gower Peninsula and the area west of the River Tawe.

Dyfed County Council was abolished on 1 April 1996, when the three historic counties were reinstated for administrative purposes with Cardiganshire being renamed Ceredigion on the following day. The name "Dyfed" remains used for some ceremonial and administrative purposes.

Administrative county 1889–1974	Local government districts 1974–1996
Cardiganshire	Ceredigion
Carmarthenshire	Carmarthen, Dinefwr, Llanelli
Pembrokeshire	Preseli (renamed to Preseli Pembrokeshire in 1987), South Pembrokeshire

== Headquarters ==
The administrative headquarters of Dyfed County Council was Carmarthen, whilst the largest settlement was Llanelli. Other significant centres of population included Haverfordwest, Milford Haven and Aberystwyth.

== Continued use of name ==
The name Dyfed was retained for such purely ceremonial purposes as the Lord Lieutenancy and in the name of some regional bodies such as Dyfed–Powys Police, Dyfed Telecom, and Dyfed Digital, but some databases, including that of the Royal Mail, continued its use at least until 2008, causing confusion in online commerce.

== Geography ==
Dyfed has a long coast on the Irish Sea to the west and the Bristol Channel to the south. It is bounded by the preserved counties of Gwynedd to the north, Powys to the east and West Glamorgan to the southeast.

Ceredigion, the northernmost part of Dyfed, has a narrow coastal strip and the Cambrian Mountains cover much of the east of the county. The highest point is Plynlimon at 752 metres (2,467 ft), on the slopes of which five rivers have their sources: the Severn, the Wye, the Dulas, the Llyfnant and the Rheidol, the first two of which flow eastwards into England and the last three of which flow westwards to the Irish Sea. Further south in Ceredigion the land is less mountainous, and the River Teifi forms the border with Carmarthenshire for part of its length.

Carmarthenshire, the southeastern part of Dyfed, is mostly hilly, except for the river valleys and coastal strip. Fforest Fawr and Black Mountain extend into the east of Carmarthenshire and the Cambrian Mountains into the north. The highest point in Carmarthenshire is Fan Foel, 781 metres (2,562 ft), on the border with Powys. The River Towy is the largest river and drains into the Bristol Channel, as do the River Loughor, the River Gwendraeth and the River Taf. Carmarthenshire has a long coastline which is deeply cut by the estuaries of the Loughor, Gwendraeth, Tywi and Taf. The south coast has many fishing villages and sandy beaches and the eastern part around Llanelli and Burry Port is more industrial.

Pembrokeshire, the southwestern part of Dyfed, juts out into the Irish Sea and has a long, much indented, coastline. It does not have the mountains found in other parts of Dyfed but much of the interior is still hilly. In the north are the Preseli Hills (Mynydd Preseli), a wide stretch of high moorland. The highest point in the Preseli Hills is Foel Cwmcerwyn at 536 metres (1,759 ft), and this is the highest point in Pembrokeshire. The largest river is the River Cleddau which has two main branches which join to form the Daugleddau estuary, which forms the important harbour of Milford Haven which enters the sea at the southwestern corner of the county. The areas around the River Cleddau are mainly level, low-lying land with many inlets and creeks. The coastline of Pembrokeshire has cliffs in places, and numerous bays and sandy beaches. The county contains the Pembrokeshire Coast National Park, which contains the 186-mile (299-kilometre) walking trail, the Pembrokeshire Coast Path.

== See also ==
- 1973 Dyfed County Council election
- 1977 Dyfed County Council election
- List of Lord Lieutenants of Dyfed
- List of High Sheriffs of Dyfed
