= 1985 Dyfed County Council election =

1985 Welsh local government election

The fourth election to Dyfed County Council was held in May 1985. It was preceded by the 1981 election and followed by the 1989 election. Once again, there were a number of unopposed returns, particularly in rural parts of the county.

== Overview ==
The Independents remained the largest party but lost ground to Labour.

== Ward Results (Cardiganshire) ==
=== Aberaeron No.1 ===
Aberaeon No.1 1985
Party	Candidate	Votes	%	±%
Independent	John Austen Rees	1,314	55.9	
Liberal	Evan Evans Williams*	1,036	44.1	
Majority			11.8	
Turnout				
Independent gain from Liberal		Swing		

=== Aberaeron No. 2 ===
Aberaeon No.2 1985
Party	Candidate	Votes	%	±%
Liberal	William Ainsleigh Jones*	1,668		
Independent	M.J. Pattenden	176		
Majority				
Turnout				
Liberal hold		Swing		

=== Aberaeron No.3 ===
Aberaeron No. 3 1985
Party	Candidate	Votes	%	±%
Plaid Cymru	John Rheinallt Evans	831	52.6	
Independent	M.D. Skyme	608	38.5	
Conservative	J.R. Scott	141	8.9	
Majority			14.1	
Turnout				
Plaid Cymru gain from Liberal		Swing		

=== Aberystwyth No.1 ===
Aberystwyth No. 1 1985
Party	Candidate	Votes	%	±%
Labour	Griffith Eric Hughes*	1,011	57.2	
Independent	Owen Henry Jones	757	42.8	
Majority			14.4	
Turnout				
Labour hold		Swing		

=== Aberystwyth No.2 ===
Aberystwyth No. 2 1985
Party	Candidate	Votes	%	±%
Liberal	Ceredig Jones	419	43.5	−1.3
Labour	Peter James Goodman*	354	40.1	−9.6
Plaid Cymru	Gareth Butler	219	21.9	+6.8
Green	Brian Kingzett	42	4.0	+4.0
Majority			6.2	
Turnout				
Liberal gain from Labour		Swing		

=== Aberystwyth No. 3 ===
Aberystwyth No. 3 1985
Party	Candidate	Votes	%	±%
Plaid Cymru	Hywel Griffiths Evans*	957	79.7	+24.7
Green	C.G.B. Simpson	244	20.3	+20.3
Majority			59.4	
Turnout				
Plaid Cymru hold		Swing		

=== Aberystwyth Rural No. 1 ===
Aberystwyth Rural No. 1 1981
Party	Candidate	Votes	%	±%
Liberal	John Gatty P. Lewis*	1,097	65.1	
Independent	Ll.D. Jones	588	34.9	
Majority			30.2	
Turnout				
Liberal hold		Swing		

=== Aberystwyth Rural No.2 ===
Aberystwyth Rural No. 2 1985
Party	Candidate	Votes	%	±%
Independent	Richard Wynn Cowell*	832	45.7	
Plaid Cymru	Marian Eluned Jenkins	508	27.9	
Labour	Howard Williams	482	26.5	
Majority			17.8	
Turnout				
Independent hold		Swing		

=== Aberystwyth Rural No.3 ===
Aberystwyth Rural No. 3 1985
Party	Candidate	Votes	%	±%
Plaid Cymru	Griffith Gwynfor Jones*	1,062	43.8	−18.2
Liberal	Peredur Wynne Eklund	978	40.4	+40.4
Labour	C. Stevens	382	15.8	
Majority				
Turnout				
Plaid Cymru hold		Swing		

=== Cardigan ===
Cardigan 1985
Party	Candidate	Votes	%	±%
Independent	Alban Dewi Lewis*	Unopposed		
Independent hold				

=== Lampeter ===
Lampeter 1985
Party	Candidate	Votes	%	±%
Labour	Robert George Harris*	Unopposed		
Labour hold				

=== Teifiside No.1 ===
Teifiside No.1 1985
Party	Candidate	Votes	%	±%
Independent	D.G.E. Davies*	Unopposed		
Independent hold				

=== Teifiside No.2 ===
Teifiside No.2 1985
Party	Candidate	Votes	%	±%
Independent	Hywel Heulyn Roberts*	874		
Alliance (SDP)	W.M. Jones	417		
Majority				
Turnout				
Independent hold		Swing		

=== Teifiside No.3 ===
Teifiside No.3 1985
Party	Candidate	Votes	%	±%
Liberal	R.E. Morris*	Unopposed		
Liberal hold				

=== Tregaron ===
Tregaron 1985
Party	Candidate	Votes	%	±%
Independent	William Gethin Bennett	1,266		
Liberal	M.J. Morgan	966		
Majority				
Turnout				
Independent gain from Plaid Cymru		Swing		

== Ward Results (Carmarthenshire) ==
=== Ammanford No. 1 ===
Ammanford No. 1 1985
Party	Candidate	Votes	%	±%
Labour	David Howard Cooke*	714	56.1	−12.0
Plaid Cymru	M. James	558	43.9	+12.0
Majority			12.2	−24.0
Turnout				
Labour hold		Swing		

=== Ammanford No.2 ===
Ammanford No. 2 1985
Party	Candidate	Votes	%	±%
Labour	Myrddin Evans*	unopposed		
Labour hold		Swing		

=== Berwick ===
Berwick 1985
Party	Candidate	Votes	%	±%
Labour	Eunydd Ashley Brynmor Thomas	unopposed		
Labour hold		Swing		

=== Burry Port East ===
Burry Port East 1985
Party	Candidate	Votes	%	±%
Labour	Thomas Elwyn Marks	513	56.9	+0.7
Plaid Cymru	E.J. McKibbin	389	43.1	+34.3
Majority			13.8	−19.4
Turnout			35.6	−10.1
Labour hold		Swing		

=== Burry Port West ===
Burry Port West 1985
Party	Candidate	Votes	%	±%
Labour	Bryan Joseph Rayner*	617	54.4	+10.1
Independent	Hugh Jones-Parry	339	29.9	
Plaid Cymru	D. Williams	178	15.7	+3.2
Majority			24.5	+23.4
Turnout			52.7	+3.5
Labour hold		Swing		

=== Carmarthen No. 1 ===
The Liberal candidate had won the seat from Labour at a by-election

Carmarthen No. 1 1985
Party	Candidate	Votes	%	±%
Labour	Kenneth Bryan Maynard	1,295	52.3	−2.0
Liberal	Harry M. Lloyd*	1,112	47.3	
Majority			5.0	
Turnout				
Labour gain from Liberal		Swing		

=== Carmarthen No. 2 ===
Carmarthen No. 2 1985
Party	Candidate	Votes	%	±%
Independent	John Elfed Thomas*	540	43.5	+5.7
Labour	Peter Short	447	36.0	−0.1
Conservative	Robert Smith Jones	220	20.5	+12.5
Majority			7.5	+5.8
Turnout				
Independent hold		Swing		

=== Carmarthen No. 3 ===
Carmarthen No. 3 1985
Party	Candidate	Votes	%	±%
Independent	William Roy Nicholl*	838	53.1	−15.5
Labour	D.F. Dale-Jones	741	46.9	+15.5
Majority			6.2	−31.0
Turnout				
Independent hold		Swing		

=== Carmarthen Rural No.1 ===
Carmarthen Rural No. 1 1985
Party	Candidate	Votes	%	±%
Ratepayer	William J. Wyn Evans*	1,112	39.9	−13.5
Labour	Terry Davies	978	35.1	−11.5
Independent	V. Thomas	400	14.4	+14.4
Plaid Cymru	John Gareth James	294	10.6	+10.6
Majority			4.8	−2.0
Turnout				
Ratepayer hold		Swing		

=== Carmarthen Rural No.2 ===
Carmarthen Rural No. 2 1985
Party	Candidate	Votes	%	±%
Labour	Philip Ian Evans*	unopposed		
Labour hold		Swing		

=== Carmarthen Rural No. 3 ===
Carmarthen Rural No. 3 1985
Party	Candidate	Votes	%	±%
Independent	E.T. Davies*	unopposed		
Independent hold		Swing		

=== Carmarthen Rural No. 4 ===
Carmarthen Rural No. 4 1985
Party	Candidate	Votes	%	±%
Independent	J. Arthur J. Harries*	unopposed		
Independent hold		Swing		

=== Carmarthen Rural No. 5 ===
Carmarthen Rural No. 5 1985
Party	Candidate	Votes	%	±%
Independent	Dr William Edmund V.J. Davies*	1,436	59.0	−22.6
Independent	C.P. Higginson	997	41.0	
Majority			18.0	−45.0
Turnout				
Independent hold		Swing		

=== Carmarthen Rural No. 6 ===
Carmarthen Rural No. 6 1985
Party	Candidate	Votes	%	±%
Independent	J.L. James*	1,411	59.8	−30.7
Alliance (SDP)	Pamela Ann Palmer	491	20.8	+20.8
Independent	Lyn Luke ap Trin Davies	456	19.3	
Majority			39.0	−42.0
Turnout				
Independent hold		Swing		

=== Carmarthen Rural No. 7 ===
Carmarthen Rural No. 7 1985
Party	Candidate	Votes	%	±%
Independent	John Gibbin	1,750	82.9	
Labour	D.K. Jenkins	362	17.1	+17.1
Majority			65.8	
Turnout				
Independent hold		Swing		

=== Cwmamman ===
The sitting member was deselected by the Labour Party but chose to contest the seat again.

Cwmamman 1985
Party	Candidate	Votes	%	±%
Independent Labour	W.J. Davies*	857	42.0	+42.0
Labour	S. Williams	625	30.6	−29.7
Plaid Cymru	John Edwin Lewis	558	27.4	−12.3
Majority			11.4	
Turnout				
Independent Labour gain from Labour		Swing		

=== Felinfoel ===
Felinfoel 1985
Party	Candidate	Votes	%	±%
Labour	Arthur Cledwyn Francis*	unopposed		
Labour hold		Swing		

=== Hengoed ===
Hengoed 1985
Party	Candidate	Votes	%	±%
Independent	Irwyn Phillips*	858	71.6	−1.8
Labour	H. Palmer	340	28.4	+1.8
Majority			43.2	−3.6
Turnout			56.3	−10.9
Independent hold		Swing		

=== Llandeilo No.1 ===
Llandeilo No. 1 1985
Party	Candidate	Votes	%	±%
Independent	W.D.R. Davies*	unopposed		
Independent hold		Swing		

=== Llandeilo No.2 ===
Llandeilo No. 2 1985
Party	Candidate	Votes	%	±%
Independent	D.T. Davies*	unopposed		
Independent hold		Swing		

=== Llandeilo No.3 ===
Llandeilo No. 3 1985
Party	Candidate	Votes	%	±%
Labour	V.E.D. Price*	unopposed		
Labour hold		Swing		

=== Llandeilo No.4 ===
Llandeilo No. 4 1985
Party	Candidate	Votes	%	±%
Labour	Ken Williams*	unopposed		
Labour hold		Swing		

=== Llandeilo No.5 ===
Llandeilo No. 5 1985
Party	Candidate	Votes	%	±%
Independent	Gerald J. Earl*	1,233	50.8	−21.8
Labour	D. Phillips	1,193	49.2	+21.8
Majority		40	1.6	−43.5
Turnout				
Independent hold		Swing		

=== Llandeilo No.6 ===
Llandeilo No. 6 1985
Party	Candidate	Votes	%	±%
Alliance (Liberal)	W.R. Price	688	28.0	+28.0
Independent	Gwyn Jones*	631	25.7	
Plaid Cymru	D. Richards	486	19.8	+19.8
Independent	T. Davies	457	18.6	+18.6
Conservative	K. Mitchell	198	8.0	+8.0
Majority			2.3	
Turnout				
Alliance gain from Independent		Swing		

=== Llanedi ===
Llanedi 1985
Party	Candidate	Votes	%	±%
Labour	I.L. Foulkes*	unopposed		
Labour hold		Swing		

=== Llanelli No.1 ===
Llanelli No. 1 1985
Party	Candidate	Votes	%	±%
Independent	Harry J. Richards*	850	58.9	+2.6
Labour	E. Davies	594	41.1	−2.6
Majority			17.8	
Turnout			37.8	−5.8
Independent hold		Swing		

=== Llanelli No.2 ===
Llanelli No. 2 1985
Party	Candidate	Votes	%	±%
Labour	Brinley Owen*	531	64.9	+9.8
Alliance (SDP)	R.C. Rosser	287	35.1	+35.1
Majority			29.8	−2.5
Turnout			38.3	−12.5
Labour hold		Swing		

=== Llanelli No. 3 ===
Llanelli No. 3 1985
Party	Candidate	Votes	%	±%
Labour	Grismond J. Williams*	unopposed		
Labour hold		Swing		

=== Llanelli No.4 ===
Llanelli No. 4 1985
Party	Candidate	Votes	%	±%
Labour	Martin Philip Morris*	unopposed		
Labour hold		Swing		

=== Llanelli No.5 ===
Llanelli No. 5 1985
Party	Candidate	Votes	%	±%
Labour	David Charles Prothero*	343	66.0	−15.8
Alliance (SDP)	E. Jones	177	34.0	+34.0
Majority			32.0	−31.8
Turnout			43.4	−3.4
Labour hold		Swing		

=== Llanelli No. 6 ===
Llanelli No. 6 1985
Party	Candidate	Votes	%	±%
Labour	J.G. Hill	unopposed		
Labour hold		Swing		

=== Llanelli No.7 ===
Llanelli No. 7 1985
Party	Candidate	Votes	%	±%
Labour	Gerald Frederick Meyler	unopposed		
Labour hold		Swing		

=== Llangennech ===
Llangennech 1985
Party	Candidate	Votes	%	±%
Plaid Cymru	Hywel Teifi Edwards*	823	75.9	+18.0
Green	Caroline Cooke	261	24.1	+24.1
Majority			51.8	+36.1
Turnout			40.9	−12.9
Plaid Cymru hold		Swing		

=== Llan-non ===
Llannon 1985
Party	Candidate	Votes	%	±%
Labour	George Malcolm Davies	848	47.3	
Independent	Philip Brinley Davies	568	31.7	
Plaid Cymru	Dorian Castagna-Davies	375	20.9	+20.9
Majority			15.6	−16.7
Turnout			42.8	−9.0
Labour hold		Swing		

=== Newcastle Emlyn No.1 ===
Newcastle Emlyn No. 1 1985
Party	Candidate	Votes	%	±%
Independent	William Michael Davies	1,215	54.8	
Independent	Lyndon Lloyd Jones	1,019	45.2	
Majority			9.6	
Turnout				
Independent gain from Labour		Swing		

=== Newcastle Emlyn No.2 ===
The Alliance candidate had stood for Labour at the two previous elections.

Newcastle Emlyn No. 2 1985
Party	Candidate	Votes	%	±%
Independent	William Evans*	1,961	70.5	−10.6
Alliance (SDP)	Peter Appleton Wilde	820	29.5	+29.5
Majority			41.0	−21.2
Turnout				
Independent hold		Swing		

=== Pembrey ===
Pembrey 1985
Party	Candidate	Votes	%	±%
Labour	Hugh Samuel Peregrine*	unopposed		
Labour hold		Swing		

=== Pontyberem ===
Pontyberem 1985
Party	Candidate	Votes	%	±%
Labour	Howard Jones*	unopposed		
Labour hold		Swing		

=== Trimsaran ===
Trimsaran 1985
Party	Candidate	Votes	%	±%
Labour	D. Deasy	599	54.1	−21.8
Plaid Cymru	I. Beynon	444	40.1	+22.2
Alliance (SDP)	V. Bevan	65	5.9	+5.9
Majority			14.0	−44.0
Turnout			57.9	−6.0
Labour hold		Swing		

=== Westfa ===
Westfa 1985
Party	Candidate	Votes	%	±%
Labour	D.R. Griffiths*	775	66.8	+8.2
Plaid Cymru	Dyfrig Thomas	385	33.2	−8.2
Majority			33.6	+16.4
Turnout			35.2	−4.8
Labour hold		Swing		

== Ward Results (Pembrokeshire) ==
=== Cemaes No. 1 ===
Cemaes No. 1 1985
Party	Candidate	Votes	%	±%
Independent	Halket Jones	1,501	68.5	+2.9
Conservative	S.H.H. Davies	487	22.2	−12.2
Alliance (SDP)	C. Lovegrove	204	9.3	+9.3
Majority			46.3	+15.0
Turnout			51.1	−7.7
Independent hold		Swing		

=== Cemaes No. 2 ===
Cemaes No. 2 1985
Party	Candidate	Votes	%	±%
Independent	T.R. George*	1,084	85.4	−2.0
Green	Marilyn Smith	186	14.6	+14.6
Majority			70.8	−4.2
Turnout			48.3	−21.7
Independent hold		Swing		

=== Cemaes No. 3 ===
Cemaes No. 3 1985
Party	Candidate	Votes	%	±%
Independent	David John Thomas*	unopposed		
Independent hold		Swing		

=== Fishguard and Goodwick No. 1 ===
Fishguard and Goodwick No. 1 1985
Party	Candidate	Votes	%	±%
Plaid Cymru	J.P.A. Maddocks*	unopposed		
Plaid Cymru hold		Swing		

=== Fishguard and Goodwick No. 2 ===
The sitting member was elected as an Independent in 1981

Fishguard and Goodwick No. 2 1985
Party	Candidate	Votes	%	±%
Independent	William Lloyd Evans	1,193	79.4	
Liberal	H. Williams*	309	20.6	
Majority			58.8	
Turnout			58.5	+11.0
Independent hold		Swing		

=== Haverfordwest No.1 ===
Haverfordwest No.1 1985
Party	Candidate	Votes	%	±%
Independent	Thomas G. Parry*	unopposed		
Independent hold		Swing		

=== Haverfordwest No. 2 ===
Haverfordwest No. 2 1985
Party	Candidate	Votes	%	±%
Independent	D.S. Grey*	611	50.5	+7.3
Independent	W.W. Ladd	600	49.5	+19.1
Majority			1.0	−11.9
Turnout			30.1	−8.9
Independent hold		Swing		

=== Haverfordwest Rural No. 1 ===
Haverfordwest Rural No. 1 1985
Party	Candidate	Votes	%	±%
Independent	David Gareth Beechey Lloyd*	unopposed		
Independent hold		Swing		

=== Haverfordwest Rural No. 2 ===
Haverfordwest Rural No. 2 1985
Party	Candidate	Votes	%	±%
Independent	William Henry Hitchings	724	37.8	
Independent	George Charles Grey	443	23.2	
Independent	J.R. Lewis	271	14.2	
Labour	W. Stocker	252	13.2	
Independent	James Lester Brock	223	11.7	
Majority			14.6	
Turnout			53.8	
Independent hold		Swing		

=== Haverfordwest Rural No. 3 ===
Haverfordwest Rural No. 3 1985
Party	Candidate	Votes	%	±%
Independent	J. James*	1,100	72.5	−1.8
Independent	J. Roberts	418	27.5	
Majority			45.0	−3.8
Turnout			38.6	−8.4
Independent hold		Swing		

=== Haverfordwest Rural No. 4 ===
Haverfordwest Rural No. 4 1985
Party	Candidate	Votes	%	±%
Independent	T.R.L. Martin*	unopposed		
Independent hold		Swing		

=== Haverfordwest Rural No. 5 ===
Haverfordwest Rural No. 5 1985
Party	Candidate	Votes	%	±%
Independent	H.W. Phillips*	818	52.3	
Independent	A.J. Webb	746	47.7	
Majority			4.6	
Turnout			44.0	
Independent hold		Swing		

=== Milford Haven No. 1 ===
Milford Haven No. 1 1985
Party	Candidate	Votes	%	±%
Liberal	J. Sizer	645	35.4	
Independent	E.G. Setterfield	501	27.5	
Independent	T.W.H. Byard*	268	14.7	
Conservative	S.J. Cole	261	14.3	
Independent	William John Kenneth Williams	145	8.0	
Majority			7.9	
Turnout			50.6	
Liberal gain from Independent		Swing		

=== Milford Haven No. 2 ===
Milford Haven No. 2 1985
Party	Candidate	Votes	%	±%
Independent	Basil Ralph Woodruff*	884	50.5	−0.2
Labour	Alun Emanuel Byrne	747	47.7	−6.6
Independent	V.H. Buckley	118	6.7	+6.7
Majority			7.8	+6.4
Turnout			45.0	−8.6
Independent hold		Swing		

=== Milford Haven No. 3 ===
Milford Haven No. 3 1985
Party	Candidate	Votes	%	±%
Labour	David John Adams*	585	48.6	−15.5
Independent	W.J. Owston	491	40.8	
Plaid Cymru	D. Hibley-Williams	128	10.6	+10.6
Majority			7.8	−20.3
Turnout			41.5	−2.5
Labour hold		Swing		

=== Narberth No. 1 ===
Narberth No. 1 1985
Party	Candidate	Votes	%	±%
Independent	Thomas Elwyn John*	1,183	53.7	
Independent	G.C. Rowe	1,019	46.3	
Majority			7.4	
Turnout			38.3	
Independent hold		Swing		

=== Narberth No. 2 ===
Narberth No. 2 1985
Party	Candidate	Votes	%	±%
Labour	Joan Asby	866	56.7	+16.6
Independent	C.W. Johnson	660	43.3	
Majority			13.4	
Turnout			45.4	−6.9
Labour gain from Independent		Swing		

=== Neyland and Llanstadwell ===
Neyland and Llanstadwell 1985
Party	Candidate	Votes	%	±%
Labour	W.G.H. James*	unopposed		
Labour hold		Swing		

=== Pembroke No. 1 ===
Pembroke No. 1 1985
Party	Candidate	Votes	%	±%
Labour	F.H. Levesley	917	52.1	+5.8
Independent	M. Mathias*	843	47.9	−5.8
Majority			4.2	
Turnout			43.3	+2.7
Labour gain from Independent		Swing		

=== Pembroke No. 2 ===
Pembroke No. 2 1985
Party	Candidate	Votes	%	±%
Labour	I.E. Morgan	1,033	69.4	+13.3
Independent	E. Reed	455	30.6	
Majority			38.8	+26.6
Turnout			35.1	+3.5
Labour gain from Independent		Swing		

=== Pembroke No. 3 ===
Pembroke No. 3 1985
Party	Candidate	Votes	%	±%
Labour	Nicholas Richard Ainger*	unopposed		
Labour hold		Swing		

=== Pembroke Rural No. 1 ===
Pembroke Rural No. 1 1985
Party	Candidate	Votes	%	±%
Independent	Rev G.R. Ball*	unopposed		
Independent hold		Swing		

=== Pembroke Rural No. 2 ===
Pembroke Rural No. 2 1985
Party	Candidate	Votes	%	±%
Independent	Norman Richard Parry	654	54.5	+6.5
Independent	D.R. Pennington	546	45.5	
Majority			9.0	
Turnout			37.4	−5.8
Independent hold		Swing		

=== Tenby ===
Tenby 1985
Party	Candidate	Votes	%	±%
Alliance (SDP)	John Pullin	606	38.1	
Independent	C.J. Evans	504	31.7	
Labour	N.R. Spence	352	22.1	
Independent	W. Lawrence	128	8.1	
Majority			6.4	
Turnout			43.8	
SDP gain from Independent		Swing		
