= 1981 Dyfed County Council election =

1981 Welsh local government election

The third election to Dyfed County Council was held in May 1981. It was preceded by the 1977 election and followed by the 1985 election. There were a number of unopposed returns, particularly in rural parts of the county.

== Overview ==
The Independents remained the largest party but lost ground to Labour.

In Pembrokeshire, Labour gained three seats from the Independents, although one of these - in Pembroke Dock - was from a former Labour councillor who stood as an Independent.

== Ward Results (Cardiganshire) ==
=== Aberaeron No.1 ===
Aberaeon No.1 1981
Party	Candidate	Votes	%	±%
Liberal	Evan Evans Williams*	1,484	71.0	
Independent	L.E. Davies	411	19.7	
Independent	R. Fearon-Jones	195	9.3	
Majority			51.3	
Turnout				
Liberal hold		Swing		

=== Aberaeron No. 2 ===
Aberaeon No.2 1981
Party	Candidate	Votes	%	±%
Liberal	W.Ainsleigh Jones	1,294	67.0	
Plaid Cymru	William Lynford Thomas	636	33.0	
Majority			34.0	
Turnout				
Liberal gain from Independent		Swing		

=== Aberaeron No.3 ===
Aberaeron No. 3 1981
Party	Candidate	Votes	%	±%
Liberal	John Owen Williams*	Unopposed		
Liberal hold				

=== Aberystwyth No.1 ===
Aberystwyth No. 1 1981
Party	Candidate	Votes	%	±%
Labour	Griffith Eric Hughes*	Unopposed		
Labour hold				

=== Aberystwyth No.2 ===
Aberystwyth No. 2 1981
Party	Candidate	Votes	%	±%
Labour	Peter James Goodman*	464	43.5	
Liberal	Ceredig Jones*	442	41.4	
Plaid Cymru	M. Dafydd	161	15.1	
Majority				
Turnout				
Labour hold		Swing		

=== Aberystwyth No. 3 ===
Aberystwyth No. 3 1981
Party	Candidate	Votes	%	±%
Plaid Cymru	Hywel Griffiths Evans*	768	55.0	
Liberal	Elizabeth Mary Griffiths	629	45.0	
Majority				
Turnout				
Plaid Cymru gain from Liberal		Swing		

=== Aberystwyth Rural No. 1 ===
Aberystwyth Rural No. 1 1981
Party	Candidate	Votes	%	±%
Liberal	John Gatty P. Lewis*	1,097	65.1	
Independent	Ll.D. Jones	588	34.9	
Majority			30.2	
Turnout				
Liberal hold		Swing		

=== Aberystwyth Rural No.2 ===
Aberystwyth Rural No. 2 1981
Party	Candidate	Votes	%	±%
Independent	Richard Wynn Cowell*	1,027	50.6	
Plaid Cymru	Marian Eluned Parry	562	27.7	
Labour	C.I. Campbell	441	21.7	
Majority				
Turnout				
Independent hold		Swing		

=== Aberystwyth Rural No.3 ===
Aberystwyth Rural No. 3 1981
Party	Candidate	Votes	%	±%
Plaid Cymru	Griffith Gwynfor Jones*	1,246	62.0	
Labour	R.B. Kemp	764	38.0	
Majority				
Turnout				
Plaid Cymru hold		Swing		

=== Cardigan ===
Cardigan 1981
Party	Candidate	Votes	%	±%
Independent	Alban Dewi Lewis*	Unopposed		
Independent hold				

=== Lampeter ===
Lampeter 1981
Party	Candidate	Votes	%	±%
Labour	Robert George Harris	1,043	49.9	
Independent Ratepayer	R.G. Daniel*	1,004	48.0	
Green	G.E. Oubridge	45	30.2	
Majority				
Turnout				
Labour gain from Independent		Swing		

=== Teifiside No.1 ===
Teifiside No.1 1981
Party	Candidate	Votes	%	±%
Independent	D.G.E. Davies*	1,967	93.0	
SDP	T.G. Glaister	148	7.0	
Majority				
Turnout				
Independent hold		Swing		

=== Teifiside No.2 ===
Teifiside No.2 1981
Party	Candidate	Votes	%	±%
Independent	Hywel Heulyn Roberts*	1,115		
Conservative	A. Richards	354	24.1	
Majority				
Turnout				
Independent hold		Swing		

=== Teifiside No.3 ===
Teifiside No.3 1981
Party	Candidate	Votes	%	±%
Liberal	R.E. Morris*	1,418	74.7	
Conservative	D.J.D. Owen	271	14.3	
Plaid Cymru	Islwyn Iago	209	11.0	
Majority				
Turnout				
Liberal hold		Swing		

=== Tregaron ===
Tregaron 1981
Party	Candidate	Votes	%	±%
Plaid Cymru	Marie James*	Unopposed		
Plaid Cymru hold				

== Ward Results (Carmarthenshire) ==
=== Ammanford No. 1 ===
Ammanford No. 1 1981
Party	Candidate	Votes	%	±%
Labour	David Howard Cooke*	898	68.1	
Plaid Cymru	D.H. Davies	420	31.9	
Majority			36.2	
Turnout				
Labour hold		Swing		

=== Ammanford No.2 ===
Ammanford No. 2 1981
Party	Candidate	Votes	%	±%
Labour	Myrddin Evans*	Unopposed		
Labour hold				

=== Berwick ===
Berwick 1981
Party	Candidate	Votes	%	±%
Labour	D. Williams	1,258	72.7	
Liberal	Kenneth Denver Rees	472	27.3	
Majority			45.4	
Turnout			45.6	
Labour hold		Swing		

=== Burry Port East ===
Burry Port East 1981
Party	Candidate	Votes	%	±%
Labour	Thomas Elwyn Marks	559	56.2	
Independent	E. Northam	230	23.1	
Independent	V. Morgan	119	12.0	
Plaid Cymru	T. Samuel	86	8.7	
Majority			33.1	
Turnout			45.7	
Labour hold		Swing		

=== Burry Port West ===
Burry Port West 1981
Party	Candidate	Votes	%	±%
Labour	Bryan Joseph Rayner	540	44.3	+7.1
Independent	Eirwen Jones-Parry*	527	43.2	+2.2
Plaid Cymru	Michael E. Clement	153	12.5	−9.3
Majority		13	1.1	
Turnout			49.2	
Labour gain from Independent		Swing		

=== Carmarthen No. 1 ===
Carmarthen No. 1 1981
Party	Candidate	Votes	%	±%
Labour	Anthony Earle*	1,124	54.3	−19.9
Independent	David Percy Jones	946	45.7	+45.7
Majority			8.6	
Turnout				
Labour hold		Swing		

=== Carmarthen No. 2 ===
Carmarthen No. 2 1981
Party	Candidate	Votes	%	±%
Independent	John Elfed Thomas	449	37.8	
Labour	Ellis James Powell*	429	36.1	
Liberal	John B. Lewis	143	12.0	
Conservative	Richard L. Thompson	95	8.0	
Independent	Gwynne Morris Williams	72	6.1	
Majority		20	1.7	
Turnout				
Independent gain from Labour		Swing		

=== Carmarthen No. 3 ===
Carmarthen No. 3 1981
Party	Candidate	Votes	%	±%
Independent	William Roy Nicholl*	933	68.6	
Labour	Kenneth Bryan Maynard	428	31.4	
Majority			37.2	
Turnout				
Independent hold		Swing		

=== Carmarthen Rural No.1 ===
Carmarthen Rural No. 1 1981
Party	Candidate	Votes	%	±%
Ratepayers	William J. Wyn Evans*	1,515	53.4	
Labour	Terry Davies	1,321	46.6	
Majority			6.8	
Turnout				
Ratepayers hold		Swing		

=== Carmarthen Rural No.2 ===
Carmarthen Rural No. 2 1981
Party	Candidate	Votes	%	±%
Labour	Philip Ian Evans	907	55.7	
Plaid Cymru	Handel Michael Ayres Williams*	644	39.6	
Conservative	D. Reed	76	4.7	
Majority			16.1	
Turnout				
Labour gain from Plaid Cymru		Swing		

=== Carmarthen Rural No. 3 ===
Carmarthen Rural No. 3 1981
Party	Candidate	Votes	%	±%
Independent	E.T. Davies*	Unopposed		
Independent hold				

=== Carmarthen Rural No. 4 ===
Carmarthen Rural No. 4 1981
Party	Candidate	Votes	%	±%
Independent	J. Arthur J. Harries*	Unopposed		
Independent hold				

=== Carmarthen Rural No. 5 ===
Carmarthen Rural No. 5 1981
Party	Candidate	Votes	%	±%
Independent	Dr William Edmund V.J. Davies*	2,024	81.6	
Plaid Cymru	Hywel Rhodri Glyn Thomas	456	18.4	
Majority			63.2	
Turnout				
Independent hold		Swing		

=== Carmarthen Rural No. 6 ===
Carmarthen Rural No. 6 1981
Party	Candidate	Votes	%	±%
Independent	J.L. James*	2,028	90.5	
Green	Brian Kingzett	213	9.5	
Majority			81.0	
Turnout				
Independent hold		Swing		

=== Carmarthen Rural No. 7 ===
Carmarthen Rural No. 7 1981
Party	Candidate	Votes	%	±%
Independent	Clodwyn Percival Phillips*	1,331	55.6	
Plaid Cymru	Daniel James Roy Llewellyn	1,062	44.4	
Majority			11.2	
Turnout				
Independent hold		Swing		

=== Cwmamman ===
Cwmamman 1981
Party	Candidate	Votes	%	±%
Labour	W.J. Davies*	1,095	60.3	
Plaid Cymru	John Edwin Lewis	722	39.7	
Majority			20.6	
Turnout				
Labour hold		Swing		

=== Felinfoel ===
Felinfoel 1981
Party	Candidate	Votes	%	±%
Labour	Arthur Cledwyn Francis*	1,484	83.9	+18.0
Plaid Cymru	B. Lane	285	16.1	−8.9
Majority			67.8	
Turnout			39.3	+1.9
Labour hold		Swing		

=== Hengoed ===
Hengoed 1981
Party	Candidate	Votes	%	±%
Independent	Irwyn Phillips*	1,057	73.4	
Labour	D. Thomas	383	26.6	
Majority			46.8	
Turnout			67.2	
Independent hold		Swing		

=== Llandeilo No.1 ===
Llandeilo No. 1 1981
Party	Candidate	Votes	%	±%
Independent	W.D.R. Davies*	Unopposed		
Independent hold				

=== Llandeilo No.2 ===
Llandeilo No. 2 1981
Party	Candidate	Votes	%	±%
Independent	D.T. Davies*	1,923	92.0	
Green	S. Rawle	168	8.0	
Majority			84.0	
Turnout				
Independent hold		Swing		

=== Llandeilo No.3 ===
Llandeilo No. 3 1981
Party	Candidate	Votes	%	±%
Labour	V.E.D. Price*	1,539	83.6	
Independent	Michael J. North	301	16.4	
Majority			67.2	
Turnout				
Labour hold		Swing		

=== Llandeilo No.4 ===
Llandeilo No. 4 1981
Party	Candidate	Votes	%	±%
Labour	Ken Williams	1,440	60.6	
Plaid Cymru	John Gareth James	936	39.4	
Majority			21.2	
Turnout				
Labour hold		Swing		

=== Llandeilo No.5 ===
Llandeilo No. 5 1981
Party	Candidate	Votes	%	±%
Independent	Gerald J. Earl*	1,806	72.6	
Labour	Peter Bourne	683	27.4	
Majority			45.2	
Turnout			46.0	
Independent hold		Swing		

=== Llandeilo No.6 ===
Llandeilo No. 6 1981
Party	Candidate	Votes	%	±%
Independent	Gwyn Jones*	Unopposed		
Independent hold				

=== Llanedi ===
Llanedi 1981
Party	Candidate	Votes	%	±%
Labour	I.L. Foulkes*	1,093	65.8	
Plaid Cymru	J. Keith Phillips	568	34.2	
Majority			31.6	
Turnout				
Labour hold		Swing		

=== Llanelli No.1 ===
Llanelli No. 1 1981
Party	Candidate	Votes	%	±%
Independent	Harry J. Richards*	934	56.3	
Labour	E. Davies	726	43.7	
Majority			12.6	
Turnout			43.6	
Independent hold		Swing		

=== Llanelli No.2 ===
Llanelli No. 2 1981
Party	Candidate	Votes	%	±%
Labour	Brinley Owen*	596	55.1	
Plaid Cymru	G. Morris	247	22.8	
Conservative	C.S. Snee	238	22.0	
Majority			32.3	
Turnout			50.8	
Labour hold		Swing		

=== Llanelli No. 3 ===
Llanelli No. 3 1981
Party	Candidate	Votes	%	±%
Labour	Grismond J. Williams*	Unopposed		
Labour hold				

=== Llanelli No.4 ===
Llanelli No. 4 1981
Party	Candidate	Votes	%	±%
Labour	Martin Philip Morris	585	56.4	
Conservative	I. Jones	241	23.2	
Plaid Cymru	D. Thomas	211	20.3	
Majority			33.2	
Turnout				
Labour hold		Swing		

=== Llanelli No.5 ===
Llanelli No. 5 1981
Party	Candidate	Votes	%	±%
Labour	David Charles Prothero*	455	81.8	
Plaid Cymru	Roger Thomas Price	101	18.2	
Majority			63.6	
Turnout			46.7	
Labour hold		Swing		

=== Llanelli No. 6 ===
Llanelli No. 6 1981
Party	Candidate	Votes	%	±%
Labour	Harold J. Thomas*	1,060	81.3	
Plaid Cymru	M. Hughes	244	18.7	
Majority			62.6	
Turnout				
Labour hold		Swing		

=== Llanelli No.7 ===
Llanelli No. 7 1981
Party	Candidate	Votes	%	±%
Labour	George M. McConkey*	Unopposed		
Labour hold				

=== Llangennech ===
Llangennech 1981
Party	Candidate	Votes	%	±%
Plaid Cymru	Hywel Teifi Edwards*	828	57.9	
Labour	Thomas Gordon Lewis	603	42.1	
Majority			15.8	
Turnout			53.8	
Plaid Cymru hold		Swing		

=== Llan-non ===
Llannon 1981
Party	Candidate	Votes	%	±%
Labour	David Bryan Richards	1,400	66.1	
Independent	I. Thomas	717	33.9	
Majority			32.3	
Turnout			51.8	
Labour hold		Swing		

=== Newcastle Emlyn No.1 ===
Newcastle Emlyn No. 1 1981
Party	Candidate	Votes	%	±%
Labour	D.T. Enoch*	Unopposed		
Labour hold				

=== Newcastle Emlyn No.2 ===
Newcastle Emlyn No. 2 1981
Party	Candidate	Votes	%	±%
Independent	William Evans*	2,100	81.1	
Labour	Peter Appleton Wilde	490	18.9	
Majority			62.2	
Turnout				
Independent hold		Swing		

=== Pembrey ===
Pembrey 1981
Party	Candidate	Votes	%	±%
Labour	Hugh Samuel Peregrine	1,045	78.1	
Conservative	T. Jones	293	21.9	
Majority			56.2	
Turnout			45.7	
Labour gain from Independent		Swing		

=== Pontyberem ===
Pontyberem
Party	Candidate	Votes	%	±%
Labour	Howard Jones*	1,588	78.2	
Independent Labour	Dynfor Vaughan Owens	440	21.7	
Majority			56.5	
Turnout			59.7	
Labour hold		Swing		

=== Trimsaran ===
Trimsaran 1981
Party	Candidate	Votes	%	±%
Labour	Samuel T. Hughes*	901	75.9	
Plaid Cymru	J. Price	213	17.9	
Independent	V. Bevan	73	6.1	
Majority			58.0	
Turnout			63.9	
Labour hold		Swing		

=== Westfa ===
Westfa
Party	Candidate	Votes	%	±%
Labour	D.R. Griffiths	786	58.6	
Plaid Cymru	William Gwyn Hopkins*	556	41.4	
Majority			17.2	
Turnout			40.0	
Labour gain from Plaid Cymru		Swing		

== Ward Results (Pembrokeshire) ==
=== Cemaes No. 1 ===
Cemaes No. 1 1981
Party	Candidate	Votes	%	±%
Independent	Halket Jones	1,571	65.6	
Conservative	D. James	822	34.4	
Majority			31.3	
Turnout			58.8	
Independent hold		Swing		

=== Cemaes No. 2 ===
Cemaes No. 2 1981
Party	Candidate	Votes	%	±%
Independent	T.R. George*	1,461	87.4	
Plaid Cymru	C.M. Phillips	210	12.6	
Majority			74.9	
Turnout			70.0	
Independent hold		Swing		

=== Cemaes No. 3 ===
This ward was previously known as Narberth No.3 but was renamed following the transfer of several wards from South Pembrokeshire to Preseli District Council.

Narberth No. 3 1981
Party	Candidate	Votes	%	±%
Independent	David John Thomas*	856	89.1	
Labour	J. Roberts	105	10.9	
Majority			78.2	
Turnout			67.2	
Independent hold		Swing		

=== Fishguard and Goodwick No. 1 ===
Fishguard and Goodwick No. 1 1981
Party	Candidate	Votes	%	±%
Plaid Cymru	J.P.A. Maddocks*	1,185	69.0	+17.4
Independent	Alwyn Cadwallader Luke	390	22.7	
Labour	D.D. Busby	143	8.3	
Majority			46.3	
Turnout			62.9	
Plaid Cymru hold		Swing		

=== Fishguard and Goodwick No. 2 ===
Fishguard and Goodwick No. 2 1981
Party	Candidate	Votes	%	±%
Independent	H. Williams	723	60.2	
Labour	Vaughan Barrah	478	39.8	
Majority			20.4	
Turnout			47.5	
Independent hold		Swing		

=== Haverfordwest No.1 ===
Haverfordwest No.1 1981
Party	Candidate	Votes	%	±%
Independent	T.G. Parry*	unopposed		
Independent hold				

=== Haverfordwest No. 2 ===
Haverfordwest No. 2 1981
Party	Candidate	Votes	%	±%
Independent	D.S. Grey*	656	43.2	
Independent	W.W. Ladd	462	30.4	
Independent	A.J. Webb	401	26.4	
Majority			12.8	
Turnout			39.0	
Independent hold		Swing		

=== Haverfordwest Rural No. 1 ===
Haverfordwest Rural No. 1 1981
Party	Candidate	Votes	%	±%
Independent	D.G.B. Lloyd	982	54.3	
Conservative	D.H. Luke	828	45.7	
Majority			8.6	
Turnout			57.0	
Independent hold		Swing		

=== Haverfordwest Rural No. 2 ===
Haverfordwest Rural No. 2 1981
Party	Candidate	Votes	%	±%
Independent	O.C. John*	Unopposed		
Independent hold				

=== Haverfordwest Rural No. 3 ===
Haverfordwest Rural No. 3 1981
Party	Candidate	Votes	%	±%
Independent	J. James*	1,329	74.3	
Plaid Cymru	I. Williams	459	25.7	
Majority			48.6	
Turnout			47.0	
Independent hold		Swing		

=== Haverfordwest Rural No. 4 ===
Haverfordwest Rural No. 4 1981
Party	Candidate	Votes	%	±%
Independent	T.R.L. Martin	838	53.2	
Independent	P.M. Thomas	736	46.8	
Majority			8.4	
Turnout			57.0	
Independent hold		Swing		

=== Haverfordwest Rural No. 5 ===
Haverfordwest Rural No. 5 1981
Party	Candidate	Votes	%	±%
Independent	H.W. Phillips*	Unopposed		
Independent hold				

=== Milford Haven No. 1 ===
Milford Haven No. 1 1981
Party	Candidate	Votes	%	±%
Independent	T.W.H. Byard*	Unopposed		
Independent hold				

=== Milford Haven No. 2 ===
Milford Haven No. 2 1981
Party	Candidate	Votes	%	±%
Independent	Basil Ralph Woodruff*	1,063	50.7	
Labour	D. Phillips	1,034	49.3	
Majority			1.44	
Turnout			53.6	
Independent hold		Swing		

=== Milford Haven No. 3 ===
Milford Haven No. 3 1981
Party	Candidate	Votes	%	±%
Labour	David John Adams	799	64.1	
Independent	Mrs R. Keane*	448	35.9	
Majority			28.2	
Turnout			44.0	
Labour gain from Independent		Swing		

=== Narberth No. 1 ===
Narberth No. 1 1981
Party	Candidate	Votes	%	±%
Independent	Thomas Elwyn John*	Unopposed		
Independent hold				

=== Narberth No. 2 ===
Narberth No. 2 1981
Party	Candidate	Votes	%	±%
Independent	W. Harry*	1,028	59.9	
Labour	R.J.B. Asby	689	40.1	
Majority			19.8	
Turnout			52.3	
Independent hold		Swing		

=== Neyland and Llanstadwell ===
Neyland and Llanstadwell 1981
Party	Candidate	Votes	%	±%
Labour	W.G.H. James	858	53.8	
Independent	J.F. Bowman	737	46.2	
Majority			7.6	
Turnout			53.6	
Labour hold		Swing		

=== Pembroke No. 1 ===
Pembroke No. 1 1981
Party	Candidate	Votes	%	±%
Independent	M. Mathias*	849	53.7	
Labour	A. Cookson	732	46.3	
Majority			7.4	
Turnout			40.6	
Independent hold		Swing		

=== Pembroke No. 2 ===
Pembroke No. 2 1981
Party	Candidate	Votes	%	±%
Labour	I.E. Morgan	715	56.1	
Independent	C. Sandell	560	43.9	
Majority			12.2	
Turnout			31.6	
Labour gain from Independent		Swing		

=== Pembroke No. 3 ===
The previous Labour councilor stood as an Independent but was defeated by a future MP.

Pembroke No. 3 1981
Party	Candidate	Votes	%	±%
Labour	Nicholas Richard Ainger	564	58.9	
Independent	C.E. Nicholls*	394	41.1	
Majority			17.8	
Turnout			31.2	
Labour hold		Swing		

=== Pembroke Rural No. 1 ===
Pembroke Rural No. 1 1981
Party	Candidate	Votes	%	±%
Independent	Rev G.R. Ball*	800	80.0	
Labour	R. Milson	200	20.0	
Majority			60.0	
Turnout			42.5	
Independent hold		Swing		

=== Pembroke Rural No. 2 ===
Pembroke Rural No. 2 1981
Party	Candidate	Votes	%	±%
Independent	W.G. Lawrence*	662	52.0	
Independent	Norman Richard Parry	610	48.0	
Majority			4.0	
Turnout			43.2	
Independent hold		Swing		

=== Tenby ===
Tenby 1981
Party	Candidate	Votes	%	±%
Independent	H. Mace	Unopposed		
Independent hold				

== By-elections between 1981 and 1985 ==
=== Carmarthen No. 1 by-election 1983 ===
A by-election was held following the resignation of Labour councillor Tony Earle.

Carmarthen No. 2 1985
Party	Candidate	Votes	%	±%
Alliance (Liberal)	Harry M. Lloyd	724		
Independent	David Howell Merriman	651		
Labour	Ellis J. Powell	537		
Majority		73		
Turnout				
Alliance gain from Labour		Swing		
