= 1993 Dyfed County Council election =

Welsh local election

The sixth and final election to Dyfed County Council was held in May 1993. It was preceded by the 1989 election. In 1995 Welsh local government reorganization led to the abolition of the authority.

== Overview ==
The Independents remained the largest party with Labour the nearest challenger.

== Ward Results (Cardiganshire) ==
=== Aberporth ===
The sitting member had won the seat at a by-election.

Aberporth 1993
Party	Candidate	Votes	%	±%
Independent	Thomas Haydn Lewis*	1,234	67.8	
Plaid Cymru	Islwyn Iago	585	32.2	−7.8
Majority			35.6	
Turnout			43.4	−1.7
Independent hold		Swing		

=== Aberteifi ===
Aberteifi 1993
Party	Candidate	Votes	%	±%
Independent	T.J. Adams-Lewis	Unopposed		
Independent hold				

=== Aberystwyth North ===
Aberystwyth North 1993
Party	Candidate	Votes	%	±%
Plaid Cymru	Hywel Griffiths Evans*	1,019	65.4	+11.9
Liberal Democrats	Robert Louis Griffin	538	34.6	+15.8
Majority			34.8	−3.8
Turnout			40.1	−7.5
Plaid Cymru hold		Swing		

=== Aberystwyth South ===
Aberystwyth South 1993
Party	Candidate	Votes	%	±%
Liberal Democrats	Eric John Griffiths	802	40.1	−4.9
Independent	Hywel Thomas Jones	485	24.3	
Independent	Owen Henry Jones	325	16.3	
Labour	B.E. Cole	255	12.8	−42.2
Independent	A. Bowden	132	6.6	
Majority				
Turnout			44.9	−12.0
Liberal Democrats gain from Labour		Swing		

=== Beulah ===
Beulah 1993
Party	Candidate	Votes	%	±%
Independent	John Emrys Jones*	872	73.9	+3.7
Independent	K. Symmons	308	26.1	−3.7
Majority			37.8	+7.3
Turnout			47.8	+3.1
Independent hold		Swing		

=== Borth ===
Borth 1993
Party	Candidate	Votes	%	±%
Plaid Cymru	Wiliam Penri James	1,373	67.8	+67.8
Independent	Richard Wynn Cowell*	653	32.2	−27.1
Majority			35.6	
Turnout			47.5	−12.1
Plaid Cymru gain from Independent		Swing		

=== Lampeter ===
Lampeter 1993
Party	Candidate	Votes	%	±%
Labour	Robert George Harris*	1,378	79.4	−3.9
Plaid Cymru	S. Taylor	358	20.6	+3.9
Majority			58.8	−10.7
Turnout			47.3	−5.0
Labour hold		Swing		

=== Llanbadarn Fawr ===
Llanbadarn Fawr 1993
Party	Candidate	Votes	%	±%
Liberal Democrats	Peredur Wynne Eklund	1,458	56.5	+56.5
Plaid Cymru	Griffith Gwynfor Jones*	1,123	43.5	−25.7
Majority			13.0	
Turnout			43.1	
Liberal Democrats gain from Plaid Cymru		Swing		

=== Llandysiliogogo ===
Llandysiliogogo 1993
Party	Candidate	Votes	%	±%
Plaid Cymru	John Rheinallt Evans*	Unopposed		
Plaid Cymru hold				

=== Llandyfriog ===
Llandyfriog 1993
Party	Candidate	Votes	%	±%
Independent	D.G.E. Davies*	Unopposed		
Independent hold				

=== Llanfihangel Ystrad ===
Llanfihangel Ystrad 1993
Party	Candidate	Votes	%	±%
Liberal Democrats	W.A. Jones*	Unopposed		
Liberal Democrats hold				

=== Llansantffraid ===
The seat had changed hands at a by-election.

Llansantffraid 1993
Party	Candidate	Votes	%	±%
Independent	R.W. Lewis*	Unopposed		
Independent hold				

=== Lledrod ===
Lledrod 1993
Party	Candidate	Votes	%	±%
Independent	William Gethin Bennett*	Unopposed		
Independent hold				

=== Ystwyth ===
Ystwyth 1993
Party	Candidate	Votes	%	±%
Liberal Democrats	John David Rowland Jones*	1,270	59.8	−5.8
Plaid Cymru	Alun Lloyd Jones	853	40.2	+5.8
Majority			19.6	−11.6
Turnout			59.0	+7.3
Liberal Democrats hold		Swing		

== Ward Results (Carmarthenshire) ==
=== Abergwili ===
Abergwili 1993
Party	Candidate	Votes	%	±%
Independent	J.L. James*	Unopposed		
Independent hold		Swing		

=== Ammanford ===
Ammanford 1993
Party	Candidate	Votes	%	±%
Labour	Myrddin Evans*	1,489	70.9	+37.8
Independent Labour	D. Thomas	442	21.0	
Independent	W. Thomas	170	8.1	
Majority			49.9	
Turnout			49.8	−19.4
Labour hold		Swing		

=== Bigyn ===
Bigyn 1993
Party	Candidate	Votes	%	±%
Labour	Martin Philip Morris*	920	59.2	
Independent	R.I. John	635	40.8	
Majority			18.3	
Turnout			31.9	
Labour hold		Swing		

=== Burry Port ===
Burry Port 1993
Party	Candidate	Votes	%	±%
Liberal Democrats	Keith John Evans	845	62.8	+62.8
Labour	A. Rollason	283	21.0	−46.4
Plaid Cymru	D.I. Howells	217	16.1	−16.5
Majority			41.8	
Turnout			38.3	+0.5
Liberal Democrats gain from Labour		Swing		

=== Carmarthen Town North ===
Carmarthen Town North 1993
Party	Candidate	Votes	%	±%
Labour	Kenneth Bryan Maynard*	unopposed		
Labour hold		Swing		

=== Carmarthen Town South ===
Carmarthen Town South 1993
Party	Candidate	Votes	%	±%
Independent	Robin Owen Griffiths	897	40.6	
Liberal Democrats	Juliana Hughes	533	24.2	−19.0
Plaid Cymru	Dewi Elwyn Williams	482	18.3	+3.5
Independent	W.G. Tucker	295	13.4	−25.1
Majority			16.4	
Turnout			48.2	+3.9
Independent gain from Liberal Democrats		Swing		

=== Carmarthen Town West ===
Carmarthen Town West 1993
Party	Candidate	Votes	%	±%
Labour	Kenneth Wigley Lloyd*	1,065	77.7	+34.5
Plaid Cymru	Sian Thomas	306	22.3	+2.0
Majority			55.4	
Turnout			41.8	−5.0
Labour hold		Swing		

=== Elli ===
Elli 1993
Party	Candidate	Votes	%	±%
Conservative	Robert James Buckland	353	30.7	+30.7
Labour	Stephen Charles James*	350	30.5	+30.5
Independent	D. Owen	256	22.3	+22.3
Liberal Democrats	Jonathan E, Burree	189	16.5	+16.5
Majority		3	0.2	
Turnout			43.4	
Conservative gain from Labour		Swing		

=== Felinfoel ===
Felinfoel 1989
Party	Candidate	Votes	%	±%
Labour	Arthur Cledwyn Francis*	879	71.1	
Plaid Cymru	J. Barr	358	28.9	
Majority			42.2	
Turnout			32.8	
Labour hold		Swing		

=== Glanamman ===
Jack Davies, who had stood as an Independent Labour candidate at the previous two elections returned to the Labour fold.

Glanamman 1993
Party	Candidate	Votes	%	±%
Labour	W.J. Davies*	824	55.0	+21.0
Plaid Cymru	John Edwin Lewis	674	45.0	+27.0
Majority			10.0	
Turnout			44.8	
Labour gain from Independent Labour		Swing		

=== Glanymor ===
Glanymor 1993
Party	Candidate	Votes	%	±%
Labour	Gerald Frederick Meyler*	735	61.4	
Plaid Cymru	C. Perrott	462	38.6	
Majority			22.8	
Turnout			32.6	
Labour hold		Swing		

=== Gorslas ===
Gorslas 1993
Party	Candidate	Votes	%	±%
Ratepayer	William J. Wyn Evans*	1,875	76.3	
Labour	V. Thomas	583	23.7	
Majority			52.6	
Turnout			56.8	
Ratepayer hold		Swing		

=== Hengoed ===
Hengoed 1993
Party	Candidate	Votes	%	±%
Labour	Hugh Samuel Peregrine*	736	67.4	
Plaid Cymru	D. Williams	356	32.6	
Majority			34.8	
Turnout			37.2	
Labour hold		Swing		

=== Kidwelly ===
Kidwelly 1993
Party	Candidate	Votes	%	±%
Labour	Hywel Glyndwr Rees*	1,081	87.2	
Liberal Democrats	T. Owens	159	12.8	
Majority			74.4	
Turnout			49.1	
Labour hold		Swing		

=== Llandovery ===
Llandovery 1993
Party	Candidate	Votes	%	±%
Independent	Thomas Theophilus*	1,770	89.4	
Labour	P. Perry	210	10.6	
Majority			78.8	
Turnout			57.4	
Independent hold		Swing		

=== Llandybie ===
Llandybie 1993
Party	Candidate	Votes	%	±%
Independent	Gerald J. Earl*	978	46.3	−36.2
Labour	Gareth M. Knowles	757	35.8	+35.8
Plaid Cymru	Sarah Ann Nesta Price	378	17.9	
Majority			10.5	
Turnout			55.3	+2.5
Independent hold		Swing		

=== Llanedi ===
Llanedi 1993
Party	Candidate	Votes	%	±%
Labour	A. Pugh	783	53.8	
Plaid Cymru	H. Williams	672	46.2	
Majority			7.6	
Turnout			37.2	−11.1
Labour hold		Swing		

=== Llanegwad ===
Llanegwad 1993
Party	Candidate	Votes	%	±%
Independent	D.T. Davies*	Unopposed		
Independent hold		Swing		

=== Llanfihangel ar Arth ===
Llanfihangel ar Arth 1993
Party	Candidate	Votes	%	±%
Plaid Cymru	Fioled Meirion Jones	1,743	67.6	
Labour	D.R. Williams	834	32.4	
Majority			35.2	
Turnout			55.3	
Plaid Cymru gain from Independent		Swing		

=== Llangadog ===
Llangadog 1993
Party	Candidate	Votes	%	±%
Independent	T.M. Thomas	1,636	68.7	
Liberal Democrats	W.R. Price	499	20.9	−13.2
Independent	B. Carr	247	10.4	
Majority			47.8	
Turnout			58.9	+1.8
Independent hold		Swing		

=== Llangeler ===
Llangeler 1993
Party	Candidate	Votes	%	±%
Independent	Thomas Wilfred Davies*	Unopposed		
Independent hold		Swing		

=== Llangennech ===
Llangennech 1993
Party	Candidate	Votes	%	±%
Plaid Cymru	William Gwyn Hopkins	1,114	55.8	
Labour	Thomas Gordon Lewis*	884	44.2	
Majority			11.6	
Turnout			35.8	
Plaid Cymru gain from Labour		Swing		

=== Llangyndeyrn ===
Boundary Change.

Llangyndeyrn 1993
Party	Candidate	Votes	%	±%
Labour	Philip Ian Evans*	1,192	57.8	−8.9
Plaid Cymru	Handel Michael Ayres Williams	870	42.2	+8.9
Majority			15.6	
Turnout			47.5	+3.7
Labour hold		Swing		

=== Llan-non ===
Llannon 1993
Party	Candidate	Votes	%	±%
Labour	George Malcolm Davies*	1,067	63.7	
Plaid Cymru	Neil W. Baker	609	36.3	
Majority			27.4	
Turnout			41.8	
Labour hold		Swing		

=== Llansteffan ===
Llansteffan 1993
Party	Candidate	Votes	%	±%
Independent	J. Arthur J. Harries*	Unopposed		
Independent hold		Swing		

=== Lliedi ===
Lliedi 1993
Party	Candidate	Votes	%	±%
Liberal Democrats	Kenneth Denver Rees	711	54.2	+19.6
Labour	Grenville Darby*	600	45.8	−19.6
Majority			8.4	
Turnout			30.4	+0.6
Liberal Democrats gain from Labour		Swing		

=== Llwynhendy ===
Llwynhendy 1993
Party	Candidate	Votes	%	±%
Labour	Eunydd Ashley Brynmor Thomas*	1,058	71.1	
Liberal Democrats	N. Burree	429	28.9	
Majority			42.2	
Turnout			25.8	
Labour hold		Swing		

=== Pembrey ===
Pembrey 1993
Party	Candidate	Votes	%	±%
Independent	Meryl Gravell	945	48.2	
Labour	Kenneth Vaughan Owens*	566	28.9	−32.2
Plaid Cymru	E. McKibbin	448	22.9	−16.0
Majority			19.3	
Turnout			39.0	+6.8
Independent gain from Labour		Swing		

=== Pontyberem ===
Pontyberem 1993
Party	Candidate	Votes	%	±%
Labour	Howard Jones*	1,242	65.2	
Liberal Democrats	Dynfor Vaughan Owens	662	34.8	
Majority			30.4	
Turnout			49.7	
Labour hold		Swing		

=== Quarter Bach ===
Quarter Bach 1989
Party	Candidate	Votes	%	±%
Labour	R. Maddock	751	53.5	
Plaid Cymru	K.J.G. Maddocks	652	46.5	
Majority			7.0	
Turnout			59.5	
Labour hold		Swing		

=== Saron ===
Saron 1993
Party	Candidate	Votes	%	±%
Labour	Ken Williams*	Unopposed		
Labour hold		Swing		

=== St Clears ===
St Clears 1993
Party	Candidate	Votes	%	±%
Independent	Dr William Edmund V.J. Davies*	1,454	60.8	
Plaid Cymru	David T. Petersen	937	39.2	
Majority			21.6	
Turnout			52.7	
Independent hold		Swing		

=== Tyisha ===
Tyisha 1993
Party	Candidate	Votes	%	±%
Plaid Cymru	Dyfrig Thomas	749	50.6	
Labour	Grismond J. Williams*	731	49.4	
Majority		18	1.2	
Turnout			43.7	
Plaid Cymru gain from Labour		Swing		

=== Whitland ===
Whitland 1993
Party	Candidate	Votes	%	±%
Plaid Cymru	Daniel James Roy Llewellyn*	Unopposed		
Plaid Cymru hold		Swing		

== Ward Results (Pembrokeshire) ==
=== Camrose ===
Camrose 1993
Party	Candidate	Votes	%	±%
Independent	Dewi Llewellyn James*	539	57.0	+5.1
Green	Kay Dearing	407	43.0	
Majority		132	14.0	
Turnout			28.2	−7.0
Independent hold		Swing		

=== Crymych ===
Crymych 1993
Party	Candidate	Votes	%	±%
Independent	T.R. George*	1,331	67.2	
Labour	Michael Frederick McNamara	340	17.2	
Conservative	Norman Hird	311	15.7	
Majority			50.0	
Turnout			46.4	
Independent hold		Swing		

=== East Williamston ===
East Williamston 1993
Party	Candidate	Votes	%	±%
Independent	Patricia Edwina Griffiths*	1,082	60.7	
Independent	Norman Richard Parry	702	39.3	+2.8
Majority			21.4	
Turnout			36.8	−2.9
Independent hold		Swing		

=== Fishguard ===
Fishguard 1993
Party	Candidate	Votes	%	±%
Independent	William Lloyd Evans*	1,372	51.3	
Labour	Alexander Frederick Allison	937	35.0	+35.0
Independent	Alwyn Cadwallader Luke	365	13.6	
Majority			16.3	
Turnout			51.9	
Independent hold		Swing		

=== Hakin ===
Hakin 1993
Party	Candidate	Votes	%	±%
Independent	Eric Ronald Harries	804	50.9	+1.2
Independent	George Noel William Max	776	49.1	
Majority			1.8	−26.0
Turnout			41.4	−11.2
Independent hold		Swing		

=== Llangwm ===
Llangwm 1993
Party	Candidate	Votes	%	±%
Independent	William Henry Hitchings*	1,039	69.5	+9.4
Labour	G.R. Stone	456	30.5	
Majority			39.0	
Turnout			36.7	−10.1
Independent hold		Swing		

=== Milford Central and East ===
Milford Central and East 1993
Party	Candidate	Votes	%	±%
Liberal Democrats	Thomas Hutton Sinclair	796	60.3	+12.7
Conservative	Stanley Thomas Hudson	523	39.7	
Majority			20.6	
Turnout			34.8	+3.3
Liberal Democrats hold		Swing		

=== Milford North and West ===
An attempt by the Liberal Democrats to win an additional seat as the sitting member for Milford Central and East changed wards was unsuccessful.

Milford North and West 1993
Party	Candidate	Votes	%	±%
Labour	David John Adams	359	39.3	+2.0
Independent	Edward George Setterfield*	447	38.2	−24.5
Liberal Democrats	G. Sizer*	263	22.5	
Majority			1.1	
Turnout			36.7	−0.9
Labour gain from Independent		Swing		

=== Narberth ===
Narberth 1993
Party	Candidate	Votes	%	±%
Independent	Alan Walter Edwards	1,107	51.6	
Labour	Joan Asby*	1,039	48.4	−2.0
Majority			3.2	
Turnout			46.8	
Independent gain from Labour		Swing		

=== Neyland ===
Neyland 1993
Party	Candidate	Votes	%	±%
Labour	W.G.H. James*	unopposed		
Labour hold		Swing		

=== Pembroke St Mary ===
Pembroke St Mary 1993
Party	Candidate	Votes	%	±%
Labour	F.H. Levesley*	unopposed		
Labour hold		Swing		

=== Pembroke St Michael ===
Pembroke St Michael 1993
Party	Candidate	Votes	%	±%
Liberal Democrats	John Martin Allen	652	51.0	+3.5
Labour	David William Edwards	627	49.0	
Majority			2.0	
Turnout			32.9	−4.0
Liberal Democrats gain from Independent		Swing		

=== Pembroke Dock Llanion ===
Pembroke Dock Llanion 1993
Party	Candidate	Votes	%	±%
Labour	Jacqueline Rita Lawrence	886	60.7	
Independent	Dillwyn Morgan Davies	574	39.3	
Majority			21,4	
Turnout			38.1	−0.1
Labour hold		Swing		

=== Pembroke Dock Pennar ===
Pembroke Dock Pennar 1993
Party	Candidate	Votes	%	±%
Labour	Stephen James May	813	46.7	−19.1
Independent	Brian John Hall	749	43.0	
Independent	D. Cook	96	5.5	
Independent	Donald Thomas Esmond	84	4.8	
Majority			3.7	
Turnout			50.3	+9.3
Labour hold		Swing		

=== Portfield ===
Portfield 1993
Party	Candidate	Votes	%	±%
Independent	T.G. Parry*	710	54.5	+2.3
Labour	Tony D. Devito	593	45.4	
Majority			9.1	
Turnout			38.9	−1.9
Independent hold		Swing		

=== Priory ===
Priory 1993
Party	Candidate	Votes	%	±%
Independent	Haydn Eric Davies*	unopposed		
Independent hold		Swing		

=== Rudbaxton ===
Rudbaxton 1993
Party	Candidate	Votes	%	±%
Independent	David John Thomas*	unopposed		
Independent hold		Swing		

=== St David's ===
St David's 1993
Party	Candidate	Votes	%	±%
Independent	John Gordon Cawood*	unopposed		
Independent hold		Swing		

=== St Dogmaels ===
St Dogmaels 1993
Party	Candidate	Votes	%	±%
Independent	John William James Roberts	689	51.1	
Green	A. Gifford	659	48.9	
Majority		30	2.2	
Turnout			35.1	
Independent hold		Swing		

=== Saundersfoot ===
Saundersfoot 1993
Party	Candidate	Votes	%	±%
Independent	Rosemary Rebecca Hayes	1,212	80.2	
Independent	D. Carter	300	19.8	
Majority			60.4	
Turnout			32.8	
Independent hold		Swing		

=== Tenby ===
Tenby 1993
Party	Candidate	Votes	%	±%
Independent	Michael Tracy Folland*	unopposed		
Independent gain from SDP		Swing		

=== The Havens ===
The Havens 1993
Party	Candidate	Votes	%	±%
Independent	T.R.L. Martin*	1,091	83.7	+44.2
Plaid Cymru	Susan Dearson	213	16.3	
Majority			67.4	
Turnout			32.3	−12.7
Independent win (new seat)				
