= 1973 Dyfed County Council election =

1973 Welsh local government election

The first election to Dyfed County Council was held in April 1973. It was followed by the 1977 election. The vast majority of the councillors elected had been members of one of the three previous county authorities which were merged to create Dyfed, namely Cardiganshire, Carmarthenshire, and Pembrokeshire.

== Overview ==
=== Cardiganshire ===
There were fifteen wards in Cardiganshire. Eight of these were won by Liberal candidates even though the parliamentary constituency was held by Labour since 1966.

A number of the elected councillors had served on the previous Cardiganshire County Council for many years, with John Rogers-Lewis and Morgan Davies having been members since 1937.

=== Carmarthenshire ===
The first elections, in line with the traditional pattern of local government in west Wales, resulted in an Independent majority. These Independents were, by and large, genuinely unattached to any political grouping. Of the political parties, Labour comfortably had the largest number of seats but were to be consistently outvoted by the Independents.

In the urban part of Carmarthenshire the contests were, in the main, between Labour candidates and one other opponent. In the rural areas, however, several Independent members of the former Carmarthenshire County Council, including aldermen, fought each other. In several cases, once these initial contests had taken place, the Independent councillor was returned unopposed.

The most significant contest, which attracted press coverage, was at Llangadog (Llandeilo No. 6 Ward) where the President of Plaid Cymru, Gwynfor Evans, a member of Carmarthenshire Council since 1949 was defeated by an Independent. The results for Plaid Cymru were disappointing and their one success in Carmarthen Rural No. 7 (the Whitland area) was partly caused by the non-Plaid vote being split between two Independent candidates.

== Ward Results (Cardiganshire) ==
=== Aberaeron No. 1 ===
Aberaeon No. 1 1973
Party	Candidate	Votes	%	±%
Liberal	Evan Evans Williams	764	29.3	
Labour	John Austen Rees	734	28.2	
Independent	I. Jones	440	16.9	
Independent	B. Jones	388	14.9	
Independent	P. Hughes	281	10.8	
Majority		30		
Turnout				
Liberal win (new seat)				

=== Aberaeron No.2 ===
Aberaeon No. 2 1973
Party	Candidate	Votes	%	±%
Independent	John Edwardes Rogers-Lewis	711	33.4	
Independent	D. Evans	497	23.3	
Liberal	E. Jones	475	22.3	
Plaid Cymru	D. Jacob Davies	447	21.0	
Majority				
Turnout				
Independent win (new seat)				

=== Aberaeron No. 3 ===
Aberaeron No. 3 1973
Party	Candidate	Votes	%	±%
Liberal	John Owen Williams*	1,599	74.2	
Independent	Edwin Pryce Jones	373	17.3	
Independent	P. Bryan	92	4.3	
Labour	J. Davies	91	4.2	
Majority				
Turnout				
Liberal win (new seat)				

=== Aberystwyth No. 1 ===
Aberystwyth No. 1 1973
Party	Candidate	Votes	%	±%
Labour	J. Jones	1,018	53.2	
Plaid Cymru	J. Williams	550	27.7	
Independent	H. Owen	365	19.1	
Majority				
Turnout				
Labour win (new seat)				

=== Aberystwyth No. 2 ===
Aberystwyth No. 2 1973
Party	Candidate	Votes	%	±%
Liberal	Gwendoline Calan Evans	485	45.7	
Labour	P. Davies	328	30.9	
Independent	E. Slater	248	23.4	
Majority				
Turnout				
Liberal win (new seat)				

=== Aberystwyth No. 3 ===
Aberystwyth No. 3 1973
Party	Candidate	Votes	%	±%
Liberal	Ceredig Jones	497	35.7	
Independent	Mary Llewelfryn Davies	355	25.5	
Independent	A. Carr	255	18.3	
Labour	Graham Thomas Parry	228	16.4	
Independent	M. Hopkinson	59	4.2	
Majority				
Turnout				
Liberal win (new seat)				

=== Aberystwyth Rural No.1 ===
Aberystwyth Rural No. 1 1973
Party	Candidate	Votes	%	±%
Liberal	John Gatty Pugh Lewis	933		
Labour	C. Marek	615	29.1	
Independent	D. Davies	562	26.6	
Majority				
Turnout				
Liberal win (new seat)				

=== Aberystwyth Rural No. 2 ===
Aberystwyth Rural No. 2 1973
Party	Candidate	Votes	%	±%
Liberal	James Owen Morgan*	846	34.0	
Independent	William Thomas Kinsey Raw-Rees	728	29.3	
Labour	G. Jones	565	22.7	
Plaid Cymru	G. Owen	347	14.0	
Majority				
Turnout				
Liberal win (new seat)				

=== Aberystwyth Rural No. 3 ===
Aberystwyth Rural No. 3 1973
Party	Candidate	Votes	%	±%
Labour	Michael Hughes	723	35.8	
Plaid Cymru	A. Griffiths	654	32.4	
Liberal	Richard Jenkin Ellis*	641	31.8	
Majority				
Turnout				
Labour win (new seat)				

=== Cardigan ===
Cardigan 1973
Party	Candidate	Votes	%	±%
Independent	Rowland Ll. Peregrine	945	49.4	
Labour	T. Lloyd	484	25.3	
Plaid Cymru	D. Williams	387	20.2	
Independent	Albert Hallam	96	5.0	
Majority				
Turnout				
Independent win (new seat)				

=== Lampeter ===
Lampeter 1973
Party	Candidate	Votes	%	±%
Independent	J. Jones	507	26.5	
Labour	J. Roberts	450	23.5	
Independent	Oliver Williams	400	20.9	
Liberal	J. Lewis	382	19.9	
Independent	D. Preece-Jones	95	5.0	
Independent	D. Davies	82	4.3	
Majority				
Turnout				
Independent win (new seat)				

=== Teifiside No.1 ===
Teifiside No.1 1973
Party	Candidate	Votes	%	±%
Independent	D.G.E. Davies	1,848	80.0	
Independent	W. Jones	461	20.0	
Majority				
Turnout				
Independent win (new seat)				

=== Teifiside No.2 ===
Teifiside No.2 1973
Party	Candidate	Votes	%	±%
Independent	Hywel Heulyn Roberts	705	40.1	
Independent	M. Griffiths	600	34.1	
Independent	S. Idris Evans	322	18.3	
Labour	G. Hutton	132	7.5	
Majority				
Turnout				
Independent win (new seat)				

=== Teifiside No.3 ===
Teifiside No.3 1973
Party	Candidate	Votes	%	±%
Liberal	R.E. Morris	1,677	84.9	
Labour	A. Wormersley	299	15.1	
Majority				
Turnout				
Liberal win (new seat)				

=== Tregaron ===
Tregaron 1973
Party	Candidate	Votes	%	±%
Liberal	W. Morgan Davies*	1,601	68.3	
Labour	I. Davies	413	17.6	
Independent	D. Evans	331	14.1	
Majority				
Turnout				
Liberal win (new seat)				

== Ward Results (Carmarthenshire) ==
=== Ammanford No.1 ===
Ammanford No. 1 1973
Party	Candidate	Votes	%	±%
Labour	David Howard Cooke*	1,160	70.2	
Plaid Cymru	J.D. Davies	492	29.8	
Majority		668	40.4	
Turnout				
Labour win (new seat)				

=== Ammanford No.2 ===
Ammanford No. 2 1973
Party	Candidate	Votes	%	±%
Labour	Myrddin Evans*	1,475	76.0	
Plaid Cymru	D.H. Davies	467	24.0	
Majority		1,008	52.0	
Turnout				
Labour win (new seat)				

=== Berwick ===
Berwick 1973
Party	Candidate	Votes	%	±%
Labour	John Raglan Thomas*	Unopposed		
Labour win (new seat)				

=== Burry Port East ===
Burry Port East 1973
Party	Candidate	Votes	%	±%
Labour	D.Ll. Rosser	504	48.9	
Independent	G.E. Phillips	349	33.8	
Plaid Cymru	L. Thomas	178	17.3	
Majority		155	15.1	
Turnout				
Labour win (new seat)				

=== Burry Port West ===
Burry Port West 1973
Party	Candidate	Votes	%	±%
Independent	Eirwen Jones-Parry*	668	56.1	
Labour	Labor Dennis	362	30.4	
Plaid Cymru	R.J. Williams	161	13.5	
Majority		306	25.7	
Turnout				
Independent win (new seat)				

=== Carmarthen No.1 ===
Carmarthen No. 1 1973
Party	Candidate	Votes	%	±%
Labour	T. Idwal Jones*	1,043	46.1	
Independent	H. Dewi Evans	661	29.2	
Plaid Cymru	Huw Edwards	558	24.7	
Majority				
Turnout				
Labour win (new seat)				

=== Carmarthen No.2 ===
Carmarthen No. 2 1973
Party	Candidate	Votes	%	±%
Labour	Ellis James Powell*	590	46.5	
Independent	T. Llewellyn Davies	427	33.6	
Liberal	Paula Yates	292	19.9	
Majority				
Turnout				
Labour win (new seat)				

=== Carmarthen No.3 ===
Carmarthen No. 3 1973
Party	Candidate	Votes	%	±%
Independent	William Roy Nicholl*	1,078	60.5	
Plaid Cymru	E.J.E. Jones	355	19.9	
Labour	Anthony Earle	350	19.6	
Majority				
Turnout				
Independent win (new seat)				

=== Carmarthen Rural No.1 ===
Carmarthen Rural No. 1
Party	Candidate	Votes	%	±%
Ratepayers	T. Austin Griffiths*	1,808	63.8	
Labour	Ryan Jones*	1,024	36.2	
Majority				
Turnout				
Ratepayers win (new seat)				

=== Carmarthen Rural No.2 ===
Carmarthen Rural No. 2
Party	Candidate	Votes	%	±%
Labour	David Gwynfor Charles	874	53.5	
Plaid Cymru	Handel Michael Ayres Williams	761	46.5	
Majority		113		
Turnout				
Labour win (new seat)				

=== Carmarthen Rural No.3 ===
Carmarthen Rural No. 3
Party	Candidate	Votes	%	±%
Independent	E.T. Davies*	1,292	58.0	
Labour	R.B.J. Gough	434	19.5	
Independent	Ben Howell	278	12.5	
Independent	Mrs G.C. Phillips	225	10.1	
Majority				
Turnout				
Independent win (new seat)				

=== Carmarthen Rural No.4 ===
Carmarthen Rural No. 4
Party	Candidate	Votes	%	±%
Independent	J. Arthur J. Harries*	1,235	73.6	
Independent	J.H. Davies*	444	26.4	
Majority				
Turnout				
Independent win (new seat)				

=== Carmarthen Rural No.5 ===
Carmarthen Rural No. 5
Party	Candidate	Votes	%	±%
Independent	Dr William Edmund V.J. Davies*	1,779	60.0	
Independent	David Myrddin Jenkins*	1,185	40.0	
Majority				
Turnout				
Independent win (new seat)				

=== Carmarethen Rural No.6 ===
Carmarthen Rural No. 6
Party	Candidate	Votes	%	±%
Independent	J.L. James*	1,041	35.9	
Independent	William Howell Phillips**	768	26.5	
Independent	T.S. Davies*	466	16.1	
Plaid Cymru	Denzil Protheroe	360	12.4	
Labour	John Russell Davies	262	9.0	
Majority				
Turnout				
Independent win (new seat)				

=== Carmarthen Rural No.7 ===
Carmarthen Rural No. 7
Party	Candidate	Votes	%	±%
Plaid Cymru	D. Aled Gwyn	1,032	38.1	
Independent	Daniel Clodwyn Thomas*	781	28.8	
Independent	E.J. Jenkins	703	26.0	
Independent	W.E. Thomas	104	3.8	
Labour	J. Jill	89	3.3	
Majority				
Turnout				
Plaid Cymru win (new seat)				

=== Cwmamman ===
Cwmamman
Party	Candidate	Votes	%	±%
Labour	J. Walters*	1,122	71.0	
Independent Labour	K. Rees	458	29.0	
Majority				
Turnout				
Labour win (new seat)				

=== Felinfoel ===
Felinfoel
Party	Candidate	Votes	%	±%
Labour	Arthur Cledwyn Francis*	Unopposed		
Labour win (new seat)				

=== Hengoed ===
Hengoed
Party	Candidate	Votes	%	±%
Independent	Irwyn Phillips	920		
Labour	J.G. Thomas	576		
Majority				
Turnout				
Independent win (new seat)				

=== Llandeilo No.1 ===
Llandeilo No. 1
Party	Candidate	Votes	%	±%
Independent	W.J. Davies*	824		
Independent	W.D.R. Davies*	583		
Independent	D.W. Davies*	572		
Plaid Cymru	J.E. Davies	384		
Labour	R. Fearon-Jones	141		
Independent	James James**	135		
Majority				
Turnout				
Independent win (new seat)				

=== Llandeilo No.2 ===
Llandeilo No. 2
Party	Candidate	Votes	%	±%
Independent	D.T. Davies*	1,132		
Independent	D. Idris Davies*	545		
Plaid Cymru	D.A. James*	462		
Labour	Elfryn Thomas*	461		
Independent	D.A. Thomas	172		
Majority				
Turnout				
Independent win (new seat)				

=== Llandeilo No.3 ===
Llandeilo No. 3
Party	Candidate	Votes	%	±%
Labour	V.E.D. Price*	1,479		
Ind. Socialist	Elwyn Rees Thomas	791		
Majority				
Turnout				
Labour win (new seat)				

=== Llandeilo No.4 ===
Llandeilo No. 4
Party	Candidate	Votes	%	±%
Labour	Idris Evans*	1,412		
Plaid Cymru	W.P. Jones	910		
Majority				
Turnout				
Labour win (new seat)				

=== Llandeilo No.5 ===
Llandeilo No. 5
Party	Candidate	Votes	%	±%
Independent	Gerald J. Earl	1,492		
Labour	William Morris*	1,013		
Majority		1,479		
Turnout				
Independent win (new seat)				

=== Llandeilo No.6 ===
Llandeilo No. 6
Party	Candidate	Votes	%	±%
Independent	E. George Morgan*	1,309		
Plaid Cymru	Gwynfor Richard Evans**	931		
Labour	Patrick J. Dobbs	426		
Majority				
Turnout				
Independent win (new seat)				

=== Llanedi ===
Llanedi
Party	Candidate	Votes	%	±%
Labour	T.E. Williams*	Unopposed		
Labour win (new seat)				

=== Llanelli No.1 ===
Llanelli No. 1
Party	Candidate	Votes	%	±%
Independent	Harry J. Richards*	944		
Labour	T. Glanville Williams	626		
Plaid Cymru	W.H. Davies	178		
Majority				
Turnout				
Independent win (new seat)				

=== Llanelli No.2 ===
Llanelli No. 2
Party	Candidate	Votes	%	±%
Labour	Brinley Owen*	734		
Liberal	Eileen Clarke	398		
Majority				
Turnout				
Labour win (new seat)				

=== Llanelli No. 3 ===
Llanelli No. 3
Party	Candidate	Votes	%	±%
Labour	Grismond J. Williams*	718		
Liberal	W. Gibby	360		
Plaid Cymru	D.R.T. Thomas	208		
Majority				
Turnout				
Labour win (new seat)				

=== Llanelli No.4 ===
Llanelli No. 4
Party	Candidate	Votes	%	±%
Labour	Mrs M. Joseph	643		
Plaid Cymru	E.E. Jones	469		
Majority				
Turnout				
Labour win (new seat)				

=== Llanelli No.5 ===
Llanelli No. 5
Party	Candidate	Votes	%	±%
Labour	W.J. Davies*	390		
Liberal	W.A. Tilleke	307		
Majority				
Turnout				
Labour win (new seat)				

=== Llanelli No. 6 ===
Llanelli No. 6
Party	Candidate	Votes	%	±%
Labour	Harold J. Thomas	933		
Plaid Cymru	P. Davies	340		
Majority				
Turnout				
Labour win (new seat)				

=== Llanelli No.7 ===
Llanelli No. 7
Party	Candidate	Votes	%	±%
Labour	George M. McConkey*	1,224		
Independent Labour	I.T. Roberts	940		
Majority				
Turnout				
Labour win (new seat)				

=== Llangennech ===
Llangennech
Party	Candidate	Votes	%	±%
Labour	M.J. Thomas*	924		
Plaid Cymru	D.A. Rees	574		
Majority				
Turnout				
Labour win (new seat)				

=== Llan-non ===
Llannon
Party	Candidate	Votes	%	±%
Labour	David William James*	1,788		
Plaid Cymru	A.D. Bowen	675		
Majority				
Turnout				
Labour win (new seat)				

=== Newcastle Emlyn No.1 ===
Newcastle Emlyn No. 1
Party	Candidate	Votes	%	±%
Labour	D.T. Enoch*	1,326		
Independent	G.E. Howell*	887		
Independent	D.G.J. Jones**	633		
Majority				
Turnout				
Labour win (new seat)				

=== Newcastle Emlyn No.2 ===
Newcastle Emlyn No. 2
Party	Candidate	Votes	%	±%
Independent	William Evans*	1,899		
Independent	D.M. Thomas*	690		
Independent	J.E. Davies*	441		
Labour	G.C. Price	276		
Majority				
Turnout				
Independent win (new seat)				

=== Pembrey ===
Pembrey
Party	Candidate	Votes	%	±%
Independent	G.P. Evans*	1,137		
Plaid Cymru	F.D.E. Morgan	325		
Majority				
Turnout				
Independent win (new seat)				

=== Pontyberem ===
Pontyberem
Party	Candidate	Votes	%	±%
Labour	Howard Jones*	1,977		
Plaid Cymru	Rev D.W. Williams	497		
Majority				
Turnout				
Labour win (new seat)				

=== Trimsaran ===
Trimsaran
Party	Candidate	Votes	%	±%
Labour	Samuel T. Hughes*	Unopposed		
Labour win (new seat)				

=== Westfa ===
Westfa
Party	Candidate	Votes	%	±%
Labour	W.J. Franklin Thomas*	Unopposed		
Labour win (new seat)				

== Ward Results (Pembrokeshire) ==
=== Cemaes No. 1 ===
Cemaes No. 1 1973
Party	Candidate	Votes	%	±%
Independent	J. Jenkins	1,070	39.4	
Plaid Cymru	M. Phillips	749	27.6	
Independent	A. Rees	655	24.1	
Independent	N. Thomas	240	8.8	
Majority			11.8	
Turnout			70.7	
Independent win (new seat)				

=== Cemaes No. 2 ===
Cemaes No. 2 1973
Party	Candidate	Votes	%	±%
Independent	T.R. George	1,119	66.9	
Independent	J. Thomas	553	33.1	
Majority			33.8	
Turnout			71.7	
Independent win (new seat)				

=== Fishguard and Goodwick No. 1 ===
Fishguard and Goodwick No. 1 1973
Party	Candidate	Votes	%	±%
Independent	Carey George	845	56.8	
Independent	D. Sayer	470	31.6	
Independent	F. Thomas	172	11.6	
Majority			25.2	
Turnout			53.6	
Independent win (new seat)				

=== Fishguard and Goodwick No. 2 ===
Fishguard and Goodwick No. 2 1973
Party	Candidate	Votes	%	±%
Independent	J. Evans	604	43.9	
Labour	A. O'Brien	406	29.5	
Independent	G. Hughes	367	26.7	
Majority			14.4	
Turnout			56.9	
Independent win (new seat)				

=== Haverfordwest No.1 ===
Haverfordwest No.1 1973
Party	Candidate	Votes	%	±%
Independent	T.G. Parry	935	60.5	
Independent	C.M. Cole	476	30.8	
Labour	A. Kersey	135	8.7	
Majority			29.7	
Turnout			51.5	
Independent win (new seat)				

=== Haverfordwest No. 2 ===
Haverfordwest No. 2 1973
Party	Candidate	Votes	%	±%
Independent	D.S. Grey	886	50.6	
Independent	T. Arran	575	32.9	
Independent	E. Williams	289	16.5	
Majority			17.8	
Turnout			45.8	
Independent win (new seat)				

=== Haverfordwest Rural No. 1 ===
Haverfordwest Rural No. 1 1973
Party	Candidate	Votes	%	±%
Independent	A. Gray	1,154	53.9	
Independent	J. Martin	987	46.1	
Majority			7.8	
Turnout			71.8	
Independent win (new seat)				

=== Haverfordwest Rural No. 2 ===
Haverfordwest Rural No. 2 1973
Party	Candidate	Votes	%	±%
Independent	O.C. John	Unopposed		
Independent win (new seat)				

=== Haverfordwest Rural No. 3 ===
Haverfordwest Rural No. 3 1973
Party	Candidate	Votes	%	±%
Independent	J. James	982		
Independent	W. Evans	965		
Independent	W. Thomas	206		
Independent	Alwyn Cadwallader Luke	173		
Majority				
Turnout				
Independent win (new seat)				

=== Haverfordwest Rural No. 4 ===
Haverfordwest Rural No. 4 1973
Party	Candidate	Votes	%	±%
Independent	W. Philpin	Unopposed		
Independent win (new seat)				

=== Haverfordwest Rural No. 5 ===
Haverfordwest Rural No. 5 1973
Party	Candidate	Votes	%	±%
Independent	H.W. Phillips	872	66.3	
Independent	G. Thorne	443	33.7	
Majority			32.6	
Turnout			46.1	
Independent win (new seat)				

=== Milford Haven No. 1 ===
Milford Haven No. 1 1973
Party	Candidate	Votes	%	±%
Independent	R. Yolland	1,089	73.3	
Labour	T.W.H. Byard	396	26.7	
Majority			46.7	
Turnout			49.0	
Independent win (new seat)				

=== Milford Haven No. 2 ===
Milford Haven No. 2 1973
Party	Candidate	Votes	%	±%
Independent	Basil Ralph Woodruff	Unopposed		
Independent win (new seat)				

=== Milford Haven No. 3 ===
Milford Haven No. 3 1973
Party	Candidate	Votes	%	±%
Independent	Mrs R. Keane	Unopposed		
Independent win (new seat)				

=== Narberth No. 1 ===
Narberth No. 1 1973
Party	Candidate	Votes	%	±%
Independent	Thomas Elwyn John	1,311	55.3	
Independent	S. Harries	1,058	44.7	
Majority			10.7	
Turnout			57.2	
Independent win (new seat)				

=== Narberth No. 2 ===
Narberth No. 2 1973
Party	Candidate	Votes	%	±%
Independent	W. Harry	758	40.6	
Independent	C. Williams	757	40.5	
Independent	M. Phillips	353	18.9	
Majority			0.1	
Turnout			68.1	
Independent win (new seat)				

=== Narberth No. 3 ===
Narberth No. 3 1973
Party	Candidate	Votes	%	±%
Independent	David John Thomas	559	45.9	
Independent	J. Steadman	311	25.5	
Plaid Cymru	D. Edwards	253	20.8	
Independent	G. Davies	96	7.9	
Majority			20.3	
Turnout			76.9	
Independent win (new seat)				

=== Neyland and Llanstadwell ===
Neyland and Llanstadwell 1973
Party	Candidate	Votes	%	±%
Labour	J. John	992	64.0	
Independent	W. Jacob	559	36.0	
Majority			27.9	
Turnout			62.7	
Labour win (new seat)				

=== Pembroke No. 1 ===
Pembroke No. 1 1973
Party	Candidate	Votes	%	±%
Independent	M. Mathias	409	27.3	
Independent	E. Morgan	376	25.1	
Independent	P. Peachey	255	17.0	
Labour	G. Prince-Harding	248	16.6	
Independent	G. Wheeler	208	13.9	
Majority			2.2	
Turnout			42.6	
Independent win (new seat)				

=== Pembroke No. 2 ===
Pembroke No. 2 1973
Party	Candidate	Votes	%	±%
Independent	J. Williams	786	52.4	
Independent	A. Dureau	430	28.6	
Independent	W. Evans	285	19.0	
Majority			23.7	
Turnout			33.2	
Independent win (new seat)				

=== Pembroke No. 3 ===
Pembroke No. 3 1973
Party	Candidate	Votes	%	±%
Labour	C.E. Nicholls	484	48.5	
Independent	E. Gibby	286	28.7	
Independent	C. Thomas	228	22.8	
Majority			19.8	
Turnout			33.2	
Labour win (new seat)				

=== Pembroke Rural No. 1 ===
Pembroke Rural No. 1 1973
Party	Candidate	Votes	%	±%
Independent	Rev G.R. Ball	Unopposed		
Independent win (new seat)				

=== Pembroke Rural No. 2 ===
Pembroke Rural No. 2 1973
Party	Candidate	Votes	%	±%
Independent	W.G. Lawrence	717	53.0	
Independent	N. Hains	635	47.0	
Majority			6.0	
Turnout			52.2	
Independent win (new seat)				

=== Tenby ===
Tenby 1973
Party	Candidate	Votes	%	±%
Independent	D. Williams	Unopposed		
Independent win (new seat)				
