= 1977 Dyfed County Council election =

1977 Welsh local government election

The second election to Dyfed County Council was held in May 1977. It was preceded by the 1973 election and followed by the 1981 election. There were a number of unopposed returns, particularly in rural parts of the county.

== Overview ==
=== Cardiganshire ===
A number of members elected in 1973 stood down. The most striking result was in Aberystwyth where Gwendoline Calan Evans, a Liberal member of the old county council since 1946 and a former alderman, was defeated by the Labour candidate in a three-cornered contest which also included historian John Davies contesting for Plaid Cymru.

=== Carmarthenshire ===
The main feature of the results in Carmarthenshire was a Plaid Cymru challenge to Labour in the more urban part of the county although they lost the one seat they held on the previous council.

== Ward Results (Cardiganshire) ==
=== Aberaeron No.1 ===
Aberaeon No.1 1977
| Party | Candidate | Votes | % | ±% |
|---|---|---|---|---|
| Liberal | Evan Evans Williams* | Unopposed | | |
| Liberal hold | | | | |

=== Aberaeron No. 2 ===
Aberaeon No.2 1977
| Party | Candidate | Votes | % | ±% |
|---|---|---|---|---|
| Independent | John Edwardes Rogers-Lewis* | 1,125 | 62.5 | |
| Plaid Cymru | William Lynford Thomas | 676 | 37.5 | |
| Majority | | | | |
| Turnout | | | | |
| Independent hold | | Swing | | |

=== Aberaeron No.3 ===
Aberaeron No. 3 1977
| Party | Candidate | Votes | % | ±% |
|---|---|---|---|---|
| Liberal | John Owen Williams* | 1,718 | 87.5 | |
| Plaid Cymru | Gerallt Jones | 246 | 12.5 | |
| Majority | | | | |
| Turnout | | | | |
| Liberal hold | | Swing | | |

=== Aberystwyth No.1 ===
Aberystwyth No. 1 1977
| Party | Candidate | Votes | % | ±% |
|---|---|---|---|---|
| Labour | Griffith Eric Hughes | 1,492 | 80.4 | |
| Plaid Cymru | Elizabeth A. Edwards | 363 | 19.6 | |
| Majority | | | | |
| Turnout | | | | |
| Labour hold | | Swing | | |

=== Aberystwyth No.2 ===
Aberystwyth No. 2 1977
| Party | Candidate | Votes | % | ±% |
|---|---|---|---|---|
| Labour | Peter James Goodman | 368 | 37.1 | |
| Liberal | Gwendoline Calan Evans* | 340 | 34.2 | |
| Plaid Cymru | John Davies | 285 | 28.7 | |
| Majority | | | | |
| Turnout | | | | |
| Labour gain from Liberal | | Swing | | |

=== Aberystwyth No. 3 ===
Aberystwyth No. 3 1977
| Party | Candidate | Votes | % | ±% |
|---|---|---|---|---|
| Liberal | Ceredig Jones* | 765 | 52.7 | |
| Plaid Cymru | Mary Fitter | 686 | 47.3 | |
| Majority | | | | |
| Turnout | | | | |
| Liberal hold | | Swing | | |

=== Aberystwyth Rural No. 1 ===
Aberystwyth Rural No. 1 1977
| Party | Candidate | Votes | % | ±% |
|---|---|---|---|---|
| Liberal | John Gatty P. Lewis* | 1,067 | 53.7 | |
| Plaid Cymru | John Thomas Jones | 919 | 46.3 | |
| Majority | | | | |
| Turnout | | | | |
| Liberal hold | | Swing | | |

=== Aberystwyth Rural No.2 ===
Aberystwyth Rural No. 2 1977
| Party | Candidate | Votes | % | ±% |
|---|---|---|---|---|
| Independent | Richard Wynn Cowell | 1,017 | | |
| Plaid Cymru | Edward Vernon Jones | 881 | | |
| Majority | | | | |
| Turnout | | | | |
| Independent gain from Liberal | | Swing | | |

=== Aberystwyth Rural No.3 ===
Aberystwyth Rural No. 3 1977
| Party | Candidate | Votes | % | ±% |
|---|---|---|---|---|
| Plaid Cymru | Griffith Gwynfor Jones | 957 | 46.7 | |
| Liberal | Glyndwr Lloyd Edwards | 638 | 31.2 | |
| Labour | Frederick Fanstone | 453 | 22.1 | |
| Majority | | | | |
| Turnout | | | | |
| Plaid Cymru gain from Labour | | Swing | | |

=== Cardigan ===
Cardigan 1977
| Party | Candidate | Votes | % | ±% |
|---|---|---|---|---|
| Independent | Rowland Ll. Peregrine* | 1,098 | 77.1 | |
| Plaid Cymru | Islwyn Iago | 327 | 22.9 | |
| Majority | | | | |
| Turnout | | | | |
| Independent hold | | Swing | | |

=== Lampeter ===
Lampeter 1977
| Party | Candidate | Votes | % | ±% |
|---|---|---|---|---|
| Independent | R.G. Daniel | 1,166 | 69.8 | |
| Plaid Cymru | J. Jones | 504 | 30.2 | |
| Majority | | | | |
| Turnout | | | | |
| Independent hold | | Swing | | |

=== Teifiside No.1 ===
Teifiside No.1 1977
| Party | Candidate | Votes | % | ±% |
|---|---|---|---|---|
| Independent | D.G.E. Davies* | 1,794 | 81.2 | |
| Independent | G. Guttridge | 416 | 18.8 | |
| Majority | | | | |
| Turnout | | | | |
| Independent hold | | Swing | | |

=== Teifiside No.2 ===
Teifiside No.2 1977
| Party | Candidate | Votes | % | ±% |
|---|---|---|---|---|
| Independent | Hywel Heulyn Roberts* | Unopposed | | |
| Independent hold | | | | |

=== Teifiside No.3 ===
Teifiside No.3 1977
| Party | Candidate | Votes | % | ±% |
|---|---|---|---|---|
| Liberal | R.E. Morris* | 1,522 | 78.7 | |
| Plaid Cymru | T. George | 411 | 21.3 | |
| Majority | | | | |
| Turnout | | | | |
| Liberal hold | | Swing | | |

=== Tregaron ===
Tregaron 1977
| Party | Candidate | Votes | % | ±% |
|---|---|---|---|---|
| Plaid Cymru | Marie James | 1,267 | 56.9 | |
| Independent | William Gethin Bennett | 958 | 43.1 | |
| Majority | | | | |
| Turnout | | | | |
| Plaid Cymru gain from Liberal | | Swing | | |

== Ward Results (Carmarthenshire) ==
=== Ammanford No. 1 ===
Ammanford No. 1 1977
| Party | Candidate | Votes | % | ±% |
|---|---|---|---|---|
| Labour | David Howard Cooke* | Unopposed | | |
| Labour hold | | | | |

=== Ammanford No.2 ===
Ammanford No. 2 1977
| Party | Candidate | Votes | % | ±% |
|---|---|---|---|---|
| Labour | Myrddin Evans* | 1,193 | 66.1 | −9.9 |
| Plaid Cymru | D.H. Davies | 613 | 33.9 | +9.9 |
| Majority | | 580 | 32.2 | −19.8 |
| Turnout | | | | |
| Labour hold | | Swing | | |

=== Berwick ===
Berwick 1977
| Party | Candidate | Votes | % | ±% |
|---|---|---|---|---|
| Labour | John Raglan Thomas* | 1,062 | | |
| Liberal | Kenneth Denver Rees | 351 | | |
| Plaid Cymru | Brian Marke | 204 | | |
| Majority | | | | |
| Turnout | | | | |
| Labour hold | | Swing | | |

=== Burry Port East ===
-->

Burry Port East 1977
| Party | Candidate | Votes | % | ±% |
|---|---|---|---|---|
| Labour | Thomas Elwyn Marks | 502 | 46.2 | −2.7 |
| Independent | Hugh Williams | 320 | 29.5 | 29.5 |
| Plaid Cymru | Edryd Morgan | 160 | 14.7 | −2.6 |
| Independent Labour | S.J.E. Samuel | 104 | 9.6 | +9.6 |
| Majority | | 182 | 16.7 | +1.6 |
| Turnout | | | | |
| Labour hold | | Swing | | |

=== Burry Port West ===
-->

Burry Port West 1977
| Party | Candidate | Votes | % | ±% |
|---|---|---|---|---|
| Independent | Eirwen Jones-Parry* | 476 | 41.0 | −15.1 |
| Labour | Bryan Joseph Rayner | 432 | 37.2 | +6.8 |
| Plaid Cymru | Michael E. Clement | 254 | 21.8 | +8.3 |
| Majority | | 44 | 3.8 | −21.9 |
| Turnout | | | | |
| Independent hold | | Swing | | |

=== Carmarthen No. 1 ===
Anthony Earle was elected at a by-election in 1975 following the death of T. Idwal Jones

-->

Carmarthen No. 1 1977
| Party | Candidate | Votes | % | ±% |
|---|---|---|---|---|
| Labour | Anthony Earle* | 1,511 | 74.2 | |
| Plaid Cymru | Elizabeth Tabitha Beynon | 526 | 25.8 | |
| Majority | | 985 | 48.4 | |
| Turnout | | | | |
| Labour hold | | Swing | | |

=== Carmarthen No. 2 ===
Carmarthen No. 2 1977
| Party | Candidate | Votes | % | ±% |
|---|---|---|---|---|
| Labour | Ellis James Powell* | 689 | | |
| Plaid Cymru | Peter Hughes Griffiths | 376 | | |
| Liberal | Janet Webb | 187 | | |
| Majority | | | | |
| Turnout | | | | |
| Labour hold | | Swing | | |

=== Carmarthen No. 3 ===
Carmarthen No. 3 1977
| Party | Candidate | Votes | % | ±% |
|---|---|---|---|---|
| Independent | William Roy Nicholl* | 1,157 | | |
| Plaid Cymru | Emrys Jones | 654 | | |
| Majority | | | | |
| Turnout | | | | |
| Independent hold | | Swing | | |

=== Carmarthen Rural No.1 ===
Carmarthen Rural No. 1 1977
| Party | Candidate | Votes | % | ±% |
|---|---|---|---|---|
| Ratepayers | William J. Wyn Evans | 1,142 | | |
| Labour | Percy Morgan Lewis | 1,058 | | |
| Independent | Jane Ann Jones | 645 | | |
| Majority | | | | |
| Turnout | | | | |
| Ratepayers hold | | Swing | | |

=== Carmarthen Rural No.2 ===
Carmarthen Rural No. 2 1977
| Party | Candidate | Votes | % | ±% |
|---|---|---|---|---|
| Plaid Cymru | Handel Michael Ayres Williams | 788 | | |
| Labour | David Gwynfor Charles* | 677 | | |
| Independent Labour | Eira Cordelia Jones | 173 | | |
| Majority | | | | |
| Turnout | | | | |
| Plaid Cymru gain from Labour | | Swing | | |

=== Carmarthen Rural No. 3 ===
Carmarthen Rural No. 3 1977
| Party | Candidate | Votes | % | ±% |
|---|---|---|---|---|
| Independent | E.T. Davies* | Unopposed | | |
| Independent hold | | | | |

=== Carmarthen Rural No. 4 ===
Carmarthen Rural No. 4 1977
| Party | Candidate | Votes | % | ±% |
|---|---|---|---|---|
| Independent | J. Arthur J. Harries* | Unopposed | | |
| Independent hold | | | | |

=== Carmarthen Rural No. 5 ===
Carmarthen Rural No. 5 1977
| Party | Candidate | Votes | % | ±% |
|---|---|---|---|---|
| Independent | Dr William Edmund V.J. Davies* | 1,683 | | |
| Independent | David Myrddin Jenkins | 1,018 | | |
| Majority | | | | |
| Turnout | | | | |
| Independent hold | | Swing | | |

=== Carmarthen Rural No. 6 ===
Carmarthen Rural No. 6 1977
| Party | Candidate | Votes | % | ±% |
|---|---|---|---|---|
| Independent | J.L. James* | Unopposed | | |
| Independent hold | | | | |

=== Carmarthen Rural No. 7 ===
Carmarthen Rural No. 7 1977
| Party | Candidate | Votes | % | ±% |
|---|---|---|---|---|
| Independent | Clodwyn Percival Phillips | 1,301 | | |
| Plaid Cymru | Daniel James Roy Llewellyn | 1,175 | | |
| Majority | | | | |
| Turnout | | | | |
| Independent gain from Plaid Cymru | | Swing | | |

=== Cwmamman ===
Cwmamman 1977
| Party | Candidate | Votes | % | ±% |
|---|---|---|---|---|
| Labour | W.J. Davies | 977 | 60.3 | |
| Plaid Cymru | John Edwin Lewis | 848 | 39.7 | |
| Majority | | | | |
| Turnout | | | | |
| Labour hold | | Swing | | |

=== Felinfoel ===
Felinfoel 1977
| Party | Candidate | Votes | % | ±% |
|---|---|---|---|---|
| Labour | Arthur Cledwyn Francis* | 1,106 | 65.9 | |
| Plaid Cymru | D. Rhys | 420 | 25.0 | |
| Communist | R.E. Hitchon | 153 | 9.1 | |
| Majority | | | 40.9 | |
| Turnout | | | 37.4 | |
| Labour hold | | Swing | | |

=== Hengoed ===
Hengoed 1977
| Party | Candidate | Votes | % | ±% |
|---|---|---|---|---|
| Independent | Irwyn Phillips* | 1,034 | | |
| Labour | D. Thomas | 383 | | |
| Majority | | | | |
| Turnout | | | | |
| Independent hold | | Swing | | |

=== Llandeilo No.1 ===
Llandeilo No. 1 1977
| Party | Candidate | Votes | % | ±% |
|---|---|---|---|---|
| Independent | W.D.R. Davies* | 1,125 | | |
| Independent | T. Davies | 884 | | |
| Independent | H. Jones | 537 | | |
| Majority | | | | |
| Turnout | | | | |
| Independent hold | | Swing | | |

=== Llandeilo No.2 ===
Llandeilo No. 2 1977
| Party | Candidate | Votes | % | ±% |
|---|---|---|---|---|
| Independent | D.T. Davies* | Unopposed | | |
| Independent hold | | | | |

=== Llandeilo No.3 ===
Llandeilo No. 3 1977
| Party | Candidate | Votes | % | ±% |
|---|---|---|---|---|
| Labour | V.E.D. Price* | 1,472 | | |
| Ind. Socialist | D. Moses | 574 | | |
| Majority | | | | |
| Turnout | | | | |
| Labour hold | | Swing | | |

=== Llandeilo No.4 ===
Llandeilo No. 4 1977
| Party | Candidate | Votes | % | ±% |
|---|---|---|---|---|
| Labour | Roger Gareth Thomas* | 1,885 | | |
| Plaid Cymru | J.G. James | 714 | | |
| Majority | | | | |
| Turnout | | | | |
| Labour hold | | Swing | | |

=== Llandeilo No.5 ===
Llandeilo No. 5 1977
| Party | Candidate | Votes | % | ±% |
|---|---|---|---|---|
| Independent | Gerald J. Earl* | 1,567 | | |
| Labour | W. Davies | 1,043 | | |
| Majority | | | | |
| Turnout | | | | |
| Independent hold | | Swing | | |

=== Llandeilo No.6 ===
Llandeilo No. 6 1977
| Party | Candidate | Votes | % | ±% |
|---|---|---|---|---|
| Independent | Gwyn Jones | 1,172 | | |
| Plaid Cymru | D. Jones | 1,112 | | |
| Majority | | 60 | | |
| Turnout | | | | |
| Independent hold | | Swing | | |

=== Llanedi ===
Llanedi 1977
| Party | Candidate | Votes | % | ±% |
|---|---|---|---|---|
| Labour | I.L. Foulkes | Unopposed | | |
| Labour hold | | | | |

=== Llanelli No.1 ===
Llanelli No. 1 1977
| Party | Candidate | Votes | % | ±% |
|---|---|---|---|---|
| Independent | Harry J. Richards* | 969 | | |
| Labour | J. Smith | 437 | | |
| Plaid Cymru | G. Morris | 364 | | |
| Majority | | | | |
| Turnout | | | | |
| Independent hold | | Swing | | |

=== Llanelli No.2 ===
Llanelli No. 2 1977
| Party | Candidate | Votes | % | ±% |
|---|---|---|---|---|
| Labour | Brinley Owen* | Unopposed | | |
| Labour hold | | | | |

=== Llanelli No. 3 ===
Llanelli No. 3 1977
| Party | Candidate | Votes | % | ±% |
|---|---|---|---|---|
| Labour | Grismond J. Williams* | 643 | | |
| Plaid Cymru | D. Thomas | 312 | | |
| Majority | | | | |
| Turnout | | | | |
| Labour hold | | Swing | | |

=== Llanelli No.4 ===
Llanelli No. 4 1977
| Party | Candidate | Votes | % | ±% |
|---|---|---|---|---|
| Labour | Mrs M. Joseph | 455 | | |
| Plaid Cymru | P. Davies | 429 | | |
| Majority | | | | |
| Turnout | | | | |
| Labour hold | | Swing | | |

=== Llanelli No.5 ===
Llanelli No. 5 1977
| Party | Candidate | Votes | % | ±% |
|---|---|---|---|---|
| Labour | David Chaeles Prothero | 354 | | |
| Independent Labour | W.J. Davies* | 196 | | |
| Majority | | | | |
| Turnout | | | | |
| Labour hold | | Swing | | |

=== Llanelli No. 6 ===
Llanelli No. 6 1977
| Party | Candidate | Votes | % | ±% |
|---|---|---|---|---|
| Labour | Harold J. Thomas | Unopposed | | |
| Labour hold | | | | |

=== Llanelli No.7 ===
Llanelli No. 7
| Party | Candidate | Votes | % | ±% |
|---|---|---|---|---|
| Labour | George M. McConkey* | Unopposed | | |
| Labour hold | | | | |

=== Llangennech ===
Llangennech
| Party | Candidate | Votes | % | ±% |
|---|---|---|---|---|
| Plaid Cymru | Hywel Teifi Edwards | 717 | | |
| Labour | M.J. Thomas* | 632 | | |
| Majority | | | | |
| Turnout | | | | |
| Plaid Cymru gain from Labour | | Swing | | |

=== Llan-non ===
Llannon 1977
| Party | Candidate | Votes | % | ±% |
|---|---|---|---|---|
| Labour | David William James* | Unopposed | | |
| Labour hold | | | | |

=== Newcastle Emlyn No.1 ===
Newcastle Emlyn No. 1
| Party | Candidate | Votes | % | ±% |
|---|---|---|---|---|
| Labour | D.T. Enoch* | Unopposed | | |
| Labour hold | | | | |

=== Newcastle Emlyn No.2 ===
Newcastle Emlyn No. 2
| Party | Candidate | Votes | % | ±% |
|---|---|---|---|---|
| Independent | William Evans* | 2,113 | | |
| Labour | Peter Appleton Wilde | 898 | | |
| Majority | | | | |
| Turnout | | | | |
| Independent hold | | Swing | | |

=== Pembrey ===
Pembrey
| Party | Candidate | Votes | % | ±% |
|---|---|---|---|---|
| Independent | J. Evans* | Unopposed | | |
| Independent hold | | | | |

=== Pontyberem ===
Pontyberem
| Party | Candidate | Votes | % | ±% |
|---|---|---|---|---|
| Labour | Howard Jones* | Unopposed | | |
| Labour hold | | | | |

=== Trimsaran ===
Trimsaran
| Party | Candidate | Votes | % | ±% |
|---|---|---|---|---|
| Labour | Samuel T. Hughes* | Unopposed | | |
| Labour hold | | | | |

=== Westfa ===
Westfa
| Party | Candidate | Votes | % | ±% |
|---|---|---|---|---|
| Plaid Cymru | William Gwyn Hopkins | 693 | | |
| Labour | G. Williams | 644 | | |
| Majority | | | | |
| Turnout | | | | |
| Plaid Cymru gain from Labour | | Swing | | |

== Ward Results (Pembrokeshire) ==
=== Cemaes No. 1 ===
Cemaes No. 1 1977
| Party | Candidate | Votes | % | ±% |
|---|---|---|---|---|
| Independent | J. Jenkins* | 1,549 | 59.0 | |
| Plaid Cymru | C.M. Phillips | 1,075 | 41.0 | |
| Majority | | | 18.0 | |
| Turnout | | | 68.4 | −2.3 |
| Independent hold | | Swing | | |

=== Cemaes No. 2 ===
Cemaes No. 2 1977
| Party | Candidate | Votes | % | ±% |
|---|---|---|---|---|
| Independent | T.R. George* | Unopposed | | |
| Independent hold | | | | |

=== Fishguard and Goodwick No. 1 ===
Fishguard and Goodwick No. 1 1977
| Party | Candidate | Votes | % | ±% |
|---|---|---|---|---|
| Plaid Cymru | J.P.A. Maddocks | 757 | 51.6 | |
| Independent | Carey George* | 710 | 48.4 | |
| Majority | | | 3.2 | |
| Turnout | | | 55.1 | +1.5 |
| Plaid Cymru gain from Independent | | Swing | | |

=== Fishguard and Goodwick No. 2 ===
Fishguard and Goodwick No. 2 1973
| Party | Candidate | Votes | % | ±% |
|---|---|---|---|---|
| Independent | J. Evans | 604 | 43.9 | |
| Labour | A. O'Brien | 406 | 29.5 | |
| Independent | G. Hughes | 367 | 26.7 | |
| Majority | | | 14.4 | |
| Turnout | | | 56.9 | |
| Independent hold | | Swing | | |

=== Haverfordwest No.1 ===
Haverfordwest No.1 1977
| Party | Candidate | Votes | % | ±% |
|---|---|---|---|---|
| Independent | T.G. Parry* | Unopposed | | |
| Independent hold | | | | |

=== Haverfordwest No. 2 ===
Haverfordwest No. 2 1977
| Party | Candidate | Votes | % | ±% |
|---|---|---|---|---|
| Independent | D.S. Grey* | Unopposed | | |
| Independent hold | | | | |

=== Haverfordwest Rural No. 1 ===
Haverfordwest Rural No. 1 1977
| Party | Candidate | Votes | % | ±% |
|---|---|---|---|---|
| Independent | A. Gray* | Unopposed | | |
| Independent hold | | | | |

=== Haverfordwest Rural No. 2 ===
Haverfordwest Rural No. 2 1977
| Party | Candidate | Votes | % | ±% |
|---|---|---|---|---|
| Independent | O.C. John* | Unopposed | | |
| Independent hold | | | | |

=== Haverfordwest Rural No. 3 ===
Haverfordwest Rural No. 3 1977
| Party | Candidate | Votes | % | ±% |
|---|---|---|---|---|
| Independent | J. James* | 1,249 | 66.9 | |
| Plaid Cymru | I. Williams | 619 | 33.1 | +33.1 |
| Majority | | | 33.8 | |
| Turnout | | | 52.4 | |
| Independent hold | | Swing | | |

=== Haverfordwest Rural No. 4 ===
Haverfordwest Rural No. 4 1977
| Party | Candidate | Votes | % | ±% |
|---|---|---|---|---|
| Independent | J. McBrearty | 784 | 93.4 | |
| Independent | B. Morris | 55 | 6.6 | |
| Majority | | | 86.9 | |
| Turnout | | | 27.0 | −29.9 |
| Independent hold | | Swing | | |

=== Haverfordwest Rural No. 5 ===
Haverfordwest Rural No. 5 1977
| Party | Candidate | Votes | % | ±% |
|---|---|---|---|---|
| Independent | H.W. Phillips* | Unopposed | | |
| Independent hold | | | | |

=== Milford Haven No. 1 ===
Milford Haven No. 1 1977
| Party | Candidate | Votes | % | ±% |
|---|---|---|---|---|
| Independent | R. Yolland* | Unopposed | | |
| Independent hold | | | | |

=== Milford Haven No. 2 ===
Milford Haven No. 2 1977
| Party | Candidate | Votes | % | ±% |
|---|---|---|---|---|
| Independent | Basil Ralph Woodruff* | Unopposed | | |
| Independent hold | | | | |

=== Milford Haven No. 3 ===
Milford Haven No. 3 1977
| Party | Candidate | Votes | % | ±% |
|---|---|---|---|---|
| Independent | Mrs R. Keane* | 467 | 52.4 | |
| Independent | T.W.H. Byard | 424 | 47.6 | |
| Majority | | | 4.8 | |
| Turnout | | | 31.5 | |
| Independent hold | | Swing | | |

=== Narberth No. 1 ===
Narberth No. 1 1977
| Party | Candidate | Votes | % | ±% |
|---|---|---|---|---|
| Independent | Thomas Elwyn John* | Unopposed | | |
| Independent hold | | | | |

=== Narberth No. 2 ===
Narberth No. 2 1977
| Party | Candidate | Votes | % | ±% |
|---|---|---|---|---|
| Independent | W. Harry* | 953 | 51.6 | +11.0 |
| Independent | R. Martin | 894 | 48.4 | |
| Majority | | | 3.2 | |
| Turnout | | | 65.4 | −2.7 |
| Independent hold | | Swing | | |

=== Narberth No. 3 ===
Narberth No. 3 1977
| Party | Candidate | Votes | % | ±% |
|---|---|---|---|---|
| Independent | David John Thomas* | Unopposed | | |
| Independent hold | | | | |

=== Neyland and Llanstadwell ===
Neyland and Llanstadwell 1977
| Party | Candidate | Votes | % | ±% |
|---|---|---|---|---|
| Labour | J. John* | Unopposed | | |
| Labour hold | | | | |

=== Pembroke No. 1 ===
Pembroke No. 1 1977
| Party | Candidate | Votes | % | ±% |
|---|---|---|---|---|
| Independent | M. Mathias* | 1,091 | 71.9 | +44.6 |
| Plaid Cymru | R. Kane | 427 | 28.1 | +28.1 |
| Majority | | | 43.8 | |
| Turnout | | | 43.7 | +1.1 |
| Independent hold | | Swing | | |

=== Pembroke No. 2 ===
Pembroke No. 2 1977
| Party | Candidate | Votes | % | ±% |
|---|---|---|---|---|
| Independent | A. Dureau | 843 | | |
| Independent | W. Corcoran | 290 | | |
| Majority | | | | |
| Turnout | | | 22.8 | −10.4 |
| Independent hold | | Swing | | |

=== Pembroke No. 3 ===
Pembroke No. 3 1977
| Party | Candidate | Votes | % | ±% |
|---|---|---|---|---|
| Labour | C.E. Nicholls* | Unopposed | | |
| Labour hold | | | | |

=== Pembroke Rural No. 1 ===
Pembroke Rural No. 1 1977
| Party | Candidate | Votes | % | ±% |
|---|---|---|---|---|
| Independent | Rev G.R. Ball* | Unopposed | | |
| Independent hold | | | | |

=== Pembroke Rural No. 2 ===
Pembroke Rural No. 2 1977
| Party | Candidate | Votes | % | ±% |
|---|---|---|---|---|
| Independent | W.G. Lawrence* | 594 | 41.7 | −11.3 |
| Independent | Norman Richard Parry | 411 | 28.8 | |
| Independent | M. Collis | 250 | 17.5 | |
| Independent | E. Hodgson | 161 | 12.0 | |
| Majority | | | 12.9 | |
| Turnout | | | 54.9 | +2.7 |
| Independent hold | | Swing | | |

=== Tenby ===
Tenby 1977
| Party | Candidate | Votes | % | ±% |
|---|---|---|---|---|
| Independent | H. Mace | 845 | 55.2 | |
| Plaid Cymru | Wynne Islwyn Samuel | 686 | 44.8 | +44.8 |
| Majority | | | 10.4 | |
| Turnout | | | 41.9 | |
| Independent hold | | Swing | | |
