= 1989 Dyfed County Council election =

1989 Welsh local government election

The fifth election to Dyfed County Council was held in May 1989. It was preceded by the 1985 election and followed by the 1993 election. There were extensive boundary changes at this election.

== Overview ==
The Independents remained the largest party with Labour the nearest challenger.

== Ward Results (Cardiganshire) ==
=== Aberporth ===
Minor boundary changes. This ward was largely based on the previous Teifiside No.3 Ward. Dewi Lewis, who previously represented Cardigan, chose to contest Aberporth on this occasion after the siting Liberal member retired.

Aberporth 1989
Party	Candidate	Votes	%	±%
Independent	Alban Dewi Lewis*	872	49.7	
Plaid Cymru	Islwyn Iago	702	40.0	
Green	Marilyn A. Wakefield	179	10.2	
Majority			9.7	
Turnout			45.1	
Independent gain from Liberal		Swing		

=== Aberteifi ===
The previous Cardigan ward was renamed Aberteifi. The siting member, Dewi Lewis, chose to contest Aberporth instead.

Aberteifi 1989
Party	Candidate	Votes	%	±%
Independent	Sandra Williams	1,119	58.7	
Independent	Hywel Gwynfi Jenkins	787	41.3	
Majority			17.4	
Turnout			56.5	
Independent hold		Swing		

=== Aberystwyth North ===
Boundary Change

Aberystwyth North 1989
Party	Candidate	Votes	%	±%
Plaid Cymru	Hywel Griffiths Evans*	977	53.5	
SLD	Ceredig Jones*	344	18.8	
Labour	N. Pritchard	265	14.5	
Green	C.G.B. Simpson	240	13.1	
Majority			34.7	
Turnout			47.6	
Plaid Cymru win (new seat)				

=== Aberystwyth South ===
Boundary Change

Aberystwyth South 1989
Party	Candidate	Votes	%	±%
Labour	Griffith Eric Hughes*	1,393	55.0	
SLD	Eric John Griffiths	1,140	45.0	
Majority			10.0	
Turnout			56.9	
Labour win (new seat)				

=== Beulah ===
The ward was previously known as Teifiside No.2

Beulah 1989
Party	Candidate	Votes	%	±%
Independent	John Emrys Jones	911	70.2	
Independent	K. Symmons	386	29.8	
Majority			40.4	
Turnout			44.7	
Independent hold		Swing		

=== Borth ===
The ward was previously known as Aberystwyth Rural No. 2

Borth 1989
Party	Candidate	Votes	%	±%
Independent	Richard Wynn Cowell*	840	59.3	+13.6
Labour	Peter James Goodman	576	40.7	+14.2
Majority			18.6	+0.8
Turnout			35.4	
Independent hold		Swing		

=== Lampeter ===
Lampeter 1989
Party	Candidate	Votes	%	±%
Labour	Robert George Harris*	1,578	83.3	
Plaid Cymru	Ashley Drake	317	16.7	
Majority			66.6	
Turnout			52.3	
Labour hold		Swing		

=== Llanbadarn Fawr ===
The ward was previously known as Aberystwyth Rural No. 3

Llanbadarn Fawr 1989
Party	Candidate	Votes	%	±%
Plaid Cymru	Griffith Gwynfor Jones*	1,538	69.2	+25.4
Labour	C. Rodgers	683	30.8	+15.0
Majority			38.4	
Turnout			42.8	
Plaid Cymru hold		Swing		

=== Llandysiliogogo ===
The ward was previously known as Aberaeron No. 3

Llandysiliogogo 1989
Party	Candidate	Votes	%	±%
Plaid Cymru	John Rheinallt Evans*	unopposed		
Plaid Cymru hold		Swing		

=== Llandyfriog ===
The ward was previously known as Teifiside No.1

Llandyfriog 1989
Party	Candidate	Votes	%	±%
Independent	D.G.E. Davies*	Unopposed		
Independent hold				

=== Llanfihangel Ystrad ===
The ward was previously known as Aberaeon No.2

Llanfihangel Ystrad 1989
Party	Candidate	Votes	%	±%
SLD	W.A. Jones*	Unopposed		
SLD hold				

=== Llansantffraid ===
The ward was previously known as Aberaeon No.1. Jack Rees, the sitting Independent member, contested the seat for Plaid Cymru but was defeated by the previous member, Evan Williams, reversing the result four years previously.

Llansantffraid 1989
Party	Candidate	Votes	%	±%
SLD	Evan Evans Williams	1,220	51.8	+7.7
Plaid Cymru	John Austen Rees*	1,134	48.2	+48.2
Majority			3.6	
Turnout			57.1	
SLD gain from Independent		Swing		

=== Lledrod ===
The ward was previously known as Tregaron.

Lledrod 1989
Party	Candidate	Votes	%	±%
Independent	William Gethin Bennett	Unopposed		
Independent hold				

=== Ystwyth ===
The ward was previously known as Aberystwyth Rural No. 1

Ystwyth 1989
Party	Candidate	Votes	%	±%
SLD	John David Rowland Jones	1,187	65.6	+0.5
Plaid Cymru	Alun Lloyd Jones	622	34.4	+34.3
Majority			31.2	
Turnout			51.7	
SLD hold		Swing		

== Ward Results (Carmarthenshire) ==
=== Abergwili ===
The ward was previously known as Carmarthen Rural No. 6.

Abergwili 1989
Party	Candidate	Votes	%	±%
Independent	J.L. James*	Unopposed		
Independent hold				

=== Ammanford ===
Boundary Change.

Ammanford 1989
Party	Candidate	Votes	%	±%
Labour	Myrddin Evans*	1,032	33.1	
Plaid Cymru	M. James	865	27.8	
Independent Labour	David Howard Cooke*	775	24.9	
Independent	D. Thomas	444	14.2	
Majority			5.3	
Turnout			57.3	
Labour win (new seat)				

=== Bigyn ===
Boundary Change.

Bigyn 1989
Party	Candidate	Votes	%	±%
Labour	Martin Philip Morris*	Unopposed		
Labour win (new seat)				

=== Burry Port ===
Boundary Change.

Burry Port 1989
Party	Candidate	Votes	%	±%
Labour	Bryan Joseph Rayner*	893	67.4	
Plaid Cymru	Raymond L. Hall	432	32.6	
Majority			34.8	
Turnout			37.8	
Labour win (new seat)				

=== Carmarthen Town North ===
The ward was previously known as Carmarthen No. 1

Carmarthen Town North 1989
Party	Candidate	Votes	%	±%
Labour	Kenneth Bryan Maynard*	1,269	77.1	+24.8
Plaid Cymru	Helen Llewelyn	377	22.9	+22.9
Majority			54.2	+49.6
Turnout			40.7	
Labour hold		Swing		

=== Carmarthen Town South ===
Boundary Change.

Carmarthen Town South 1989
Party	Candidate	Votes	%	±%
SLD	Richard John Goodridge	898	43.2	
Independent	W.G. Tucker	799	38.5	
Plaid Cymru	Geraint Thomas	381	18.3	
Majority			4.7	
Turnout			44.3	
SLD win (new seat)				

=== Carmarthen Town West ===
The ward was previously known as Carmarthen No. 3

Carmarthen Town West 1989
Party	Candidate	Votes	%	±%
Labour	Kenneth Wigley Lloyd	606	43.2	−3.7
Independent	Helen Margaret Thomas	539	37.5	
Plaid Cymru	Mary Kathleen Davies	291	20.3	+20.3
Majority			4.7	
Turnout			46.8	
Labour gain from Independent		Swing		

=== Elli ===
Boundary Change.

Elli 1989
Party	Candidate	Votes	%	±%
Labour	Stephen Charles James	Unopposed		
Labour win (new seat)				

=== Felinfoel ===
Felinfoel 1989
Party	Candidate	Votes	%	±%
Labour	Arthur Cledwyn Francis*	Unopposed		
Labour hold				

=== Glanamman ===
The ward was previously known as Cwmamman.

Glanamman 1989
Party	Candidate	Votes	%	±%
Independent Labour	W.J. Davies*	857	45.2	+3.2
Labour	S. Williams	593	34.0	+3.4
Plaid Cymru	John Edwin Lewis	314	18.0	−9.4
Green	M. Burgess	48	2.8	+2.8
Majority			11.2	
Turnout				
Independent Labour hold		Swing		

=== Glanymor ===
Boundary Change.

Glanymor 1989
Party	Candidate	Votes	%	±%
Labour	Gerald Frederick Meyler*	Unopposed		
Labour win (new seat)				

=== Gorslas ===
The ward was previously known as Carmarthen Rural No. 1

Gorslas 1989
Party	Candidate	Votes	%	±%
Ratepayer	William J. Wyn Evans*	unopposed		
Ratepayer hold		Swing		

=== Hengoed ===
Hugh Peregrine, who previously represented Pembrey, was returned unopposed for the Hengoed ward after the sitting Independent member stood down.

Hengoed 1989
Party	Candidate	Votes	%	±%
Labour	Hugh Samuel Peregrine*	Unopposed		
Labour gain from Independent				

=== Kidwelly ===
Kidwelly 1989
Party	Candidate	Votes	%	±%
Labour	Hywel Glyndwr Rees*	Unopposed		
Labour hold				

=== Llandovery ===
The ward was previously known as Llandeilo No. 1

Llandovery 1989
Party	Candidate	Votes	%	±%
Independent	W.D.R. Davies*	1,171	75.6	
Green	R. Bowden	377	24.4	+24.4
Majority			51.2	
Turnout			43.5	
Independent hold		Swing		

=== Llandybie ===
The ward was previously known as Llandeilo No. 5

Llandybie 1989
Party	Candidate	Votes	%	±%
Independent	Gerald J. Earl*	1,650	82.5	+31.7
Independent	P.A. Langford	347	17.5	
Majority			65.0	
Turnout			52.7	
Independent hold		Swing		

=== Llanedi ===
Llanedi 1989
Party	Candidate	Votes	%	±%
Independent	D. Davies	1,140	60.6	
Labour	L. Jenkins	740	39.4	
Majority			21.2	
Turnout			48.4	
Independent gain from Labour		Swing		

=== Llanegwad ===
The ward was previously known as Llandeilo No. 2

Llanegwad 1989
Party	Candidate	Votes	%	±%
Independent	D.T. Davies*	1,688	88.4	
Green	G.E. Oubridge	222	11.6	
Majority			76.8	
Turnout			48.0	
Independent hold		Swing		

=== Llanfihangel ar Arth ===
The ward was previously known as Newcastle Emlyn No. 2.

Llanfihangel ar Arth 1989
Party	Candidate	Votes	%	±%
Independent	William Evans*	1,884	68.8	−1.7
Plaid Cymru	M.E. Thomason	854	31.2	+31.2
Majority			37.6	
Turnout			60.5	
Independent hold		Swing		

=== Llangadog ===
The ward was previously known as Llandeilo No. 6

Llangadog 1989
Party	Candidate	Votes	%	±%
Independent	Gwyn Jones	781	34.3	+8.6
SLD	W.R. Price*	777	34.1	+6.1
Independent	D. Thomas	545	23.9	
Green	Tim Shaw	177	7.8	+7.8
Majority		4	0.2	
Turnout			57.1	
Independent gain from SLD		Swing		

=== Llangeler ===
The ward was previously known as Newcastle Emlyn No. 1

Llangeler 1985
Party	Candidate	Votes	%	±%
Independent	Thomas Wilfred Davies	1,509	62.8	
Independent	D.J. Jones	455	19.0	
Independent	William Michael Davies*	437	18.2	−36.6
Majority			43.8	
Turnout			60.3	
Independent hold		Swing		

=== Llangennech ===
Llangennech 1989
Party	Candidate	Votes	%	±%
Labour	Thomas Gordon Lewis	Unopposed		
Labour gain from Plaid Cymru				

=== Llangyndeyrn ===
Boundary Change.

Llangyndeyrn 1989
Party	Candidate	Votes	%	±%
Labour	Philip Ian Evans*	1,283	66.7	
Plaid Cymru	Handel Michael Ayres Williams	641	33.3	
Majority			33.4	
Turnout			43.8	
Labour hold		Swing		

=== Llan-non ===
Llannon 1989
Party	Candidate	Votes	%	±%
Labour	George Malcolm Davies*	Unopposed		
Labour hold				

=== Llansteffan ===
The ward was previously known as Carmarthen Rural No. 4.

Llansteffan 1989
Party	Candidate	Votes	%	±%
Independent	J. Arthur J. Harries*	Unopposed		
Independent hold				

=== Lliedi ===
Boundary Change.

Lliedi 1989
Party	Candidate	Votes	%	±%
Labour	Grenville Darby	856	65.4	
SLD	Jonathan E. Burree	452	34.6	
Majority			30.8	
Turnout			29.8	
Labour win (new seat)				

=== Llwynhendy ===
Boundary Change.

Llwynhendy 1989
Party	Candidate	Votes	%	±%
Labour	Eunydd Ashley Brynmor Thomas*	Unopposed		
Labour win (new seat)				

=== Pembrey ===
Pembrey 1989
Party	Candidate	Votes	%	±%
Labour	Kenneth Vaughan Owens	979	61.1	
Plaid Cymru	H.M. Tierney	622	38.9	
Majority			22.2	
Turnout			32.2	
Labour hold		Swing		

=== Pontyberem ===
Pontyberem 1989
Party	Candidate	Votes	%	±%
Labour	Howard Jones*	Unopposed		
Labour hold				

=== Quarter Bach ===
The ward was previously known as Llandeilo No. 3

Quarter Bach 1989
Party	Candidate	Votes	%	±%
Labour	R. Maddock	Unopposed		
Labour hold				

=== Saron ===
The ward was previously known as Llandeilo No. 4

Saron 1989
Party	Candidate	Votes	%	±%
Labour	Ken Williams*	1,177	61.3	
Plaid Cymru	John Gareth James	742	38.7	
Majority			22.6	
Turnout			46.3	
Labour hold		Swing		

=== St Clears ===
The ward was previously known as Carmarthen Rural No. 5

St Clears 1989
Party	Candidate	Votes	%	±%
Independent	Dr William Edmund V.J. Davies*	Unopposed		
Independent hold				

=== Tyisha ===
Boundary Change.

Tyisha 1989
Party	Candidate	Votes	%	±%
Labour	Grismond J. Williams*	Unopposed		
Labour win (new seat)				

=== Whitland ===
The ward was previously known as Carmarthen Rural No. 7. Plaid Cymru won the seat unopposed after the sitting independent member stood down.

Whitland 1989
Party	Candidate	Votes	%	±%
Plaid Cymru	Daniel James Roy Llewellyn	Unopposed		
Plaid Cymru gain from Independent				

== Ward Results (Pembrokeshire) ==
=== Camrose ===
Boundary change

Camrose 1989
Party	Candidate	Votes	%	±%
Independent	Dewi Llewellyn James	588	51.9	
Independent	Alwyn Cadwallader Luke	546	48.1	
Majority			3.8	
Turnout			35.2	
Independent win (new seat)				

=== Crymych ===
The ward was previously known as Cemaes No. 2.

Crymych 1989
Party	Candidate	Votes	%	±%
Independent	T.R. George*	Unopposed		
Independent hold				

=== East Williamston ===
Minor boundary change. The ward was previously known as Pembroke Rural No. 2.

East Williamston 1989
Party	Candidate	Votes	%	±%
Independent	W.R. Douglas	1,171	63.5	
Independent	Norman Richard Parry*	673	36.5	−18.0
Majority			27.0	
Turnout			39.7	
Independent hold		Swing		

=== Fishguard ===
Boundary change.

Fishguard 1989
Party	Candidate	Votes	%	±%
Independent	William Lloyd Evans*	Unopposed		
Independent win (new seat)				

=== Hakin ===
The ward was previously known as Milford Haven No. 2

Hakin 1989
Party	Candidate	Votes	%	±%
Independent	Eric Ronald Harries	1,003	49.7	
Independent	Arthur George Edwards	442	21.9	
Labour	Alun Emanuel Byrne	421	20.9	−26.8
Plaid Cymru	A. Venables	151	7.5	+7.5
Majority			27.8	
Turnout			52.6	+7.6
Independent hold		Swing		

=== Llangwm ===
Boundary change.

Llangwm 1989
Party	Candidate	Votes	%	±%
Independent	William Henry Hitchings*	1,149	60.1	
Independent	H.W. Phillips*	624	32.6	
Independent	G.R. Stone	139	7.3	
Majority			27.5	
Turnout			46.8	
Independent win (new seat)				

=== Milford Central and East ===
The ward was previously known as Milford Haven No. 1.

Milford Central and East 1989
Party	Candidate	Votes	%	±%
SLD	G. Sizer*	577	47.6	+12.2
Labour	P. Greenfield-Long	397	32.7	
Independent	Irwin Edwards	239	19.7	
Majority			14.9	
Turnout			34.8	−15.8
SLD hold		Swing		

=== Milford North and West ===
The ward was previously known as Milford Haven No. 3.

Milford North and West 1989
Party	Candidate	Votes	%	±%
Independent	Edward George Setterfield	742	62.7	
Labour	David John Adams*	441	37.3	−11.3
Majority			25.4	
Turnout			37.6	−3.9
Independent gain from Labour		Swing		

=== Narberth ===
The ward was previously known as Narberth No. 2.

Narberth 1989
Party	Candidate	Votes	%	±%
Labour	Joan Asby*	1,109	50.4	−6.3
Conservative	Alan Walter Edwards	1,090	49.6	
Majority			0.8	
Turnout			51.5	+6.1
Labour hold		Swing		

=== Neyland ===
The ward was previously known as Neyland and Llanstadwell.

Neyland 1989
Party	Candidate	Votes	%	±%
Labour	W.G.H. James*	Unopposed		
Labour hold				

=== Pembroke St Mary ===
The ward was previously known as Pembroke No. 1.

Pembroke St Mary 1989
Party	Candidate	Votes	%	±%
Labour	F.H. Levesley*	Unopposed		
Labour hold				

=== Pembroke St Michael ===
The ward was previously known as Pembroke Rural No. 1.

Pembroke St Michael 1989
Party	Candidate	Votes	%	±%
Independent	Rev G.R. Ball*	738	52.5	
SLD	A. Hovey	667	47.5	
Majority			5.0	
Turnout			36.9	
Independent hold		Swing		

=== Pembroke Dock Llanion ===
The ward was previously known as Pembroke No. 2

Pembroke Dock Llanion 1989
Party	Candidate	Votes	%	±%
Labour	I.E. Morgan*	719	51.5	−17.9
Independent	D. Jones	456	32.7	
Independent	Dilys Tice	221	15.8	
Majority			18.8	−20.0
Turnout			38.2	+3.1
Labour hold		Swing		

=== Pembroke Dock Pennar ===
The ward was previously known as Pembroke No. 3

Pembroke Dock Pennar 1989
Party	Candidate	Votes	%	±%
Labour	Nicholas Richard Ainger*	899	65.8	
SLD	J.S. Fenwick	467	34.2	
Majority			31.6	
Turnout			41.0	
Labour hold		Swing		

=== Portfield ===
The ward was previously known as Haverfordwest No.1.

Portfield 1989
Party	Candidate	Votes	%	±%
Independent	T.G. Parry*	732	52.2	
Independent	Donald Richard Twigg	671	47.8	
Majority			4.4	
Turnout			40.8	
Independent hold		Swing		

=== Priory ===
The ward was previously known as Haverfordwest No. 2

Priory 1989
Party	Candidate	Votes	%	±%
Independent	Haydn Eric Davies	1,424	68.8	
Independent	D.S. Grey*	645	31.2	
Majority			37.6	
Turnout			45.5	+14.4
Independent hold		Swing		

=== Rudbaxton ===
The ward was previously known as Cemaes No. 3.

Rudbaxton 1989
Party	Candidate	Votes	%	±%
Independent	David John Thomas*	1,285	80.4	
Independent	John William James Roberts	314	19.6	
Majority			60.8	
Turnout			39.5	
Independent hold		Swing		

=== St David's ===
The ward was previously known as Haverfordwest Rural No. 1

St David's 1989
Party	Candidate	Votes	%	±%
Independent	John Gordon Cawood	1,615	93.1	
Independent	W.W. Bartlett	119	6.9	
Majority			86.2	
Turnout			45.3	
Independent hold		Swing		

=== St Dogmaels ===
The ward was previously known as Cemaes No. 1.

St Dogmaels 1989
Party	Candidate	Votes	%	±%
Independent	Halket Jones	1,387		
Labour	P. Harwood	238		
Independent	W. Jones	146		
Majority				
Turnout				
Independent hold		Swing		

=== Saundersfoot ===
The ward was previously known as Narberth No. 1.

Saundersfoot 1989
Party	Candidate	Votes	%	±%
Independent	G.C. Rowe	Unopposed		
Independent hold				

=== Tenby ===
Tenby 1989
Party	Candidate	Votes	%	±%
Independent	Michael Tracy Folland	788	39.5	
Independent	W. Hardy	510	25.6	
Independent	William James Rossiter	343	17.2	
Plaid Cymru	D. Griffiths	212	10.6	
Independent	C.J. Evans	89	4.5	−27.2
Independent	A. Gozzer	54	2.7	
Majority			13.9	
Turnout			46.2	+2.4
Independent gain from SDP		Swing		

=== The Havens ===
Boundary change.

The Havens 1989
Party	Candidate	Votes	%	±%
Independent	T.R.L. Martin*	679	39.5	
Independent	George Charles Grey	521	30.3	
Independent	Basil Ralph Woodruff*	275	16.0	
Independent	K.W.J. Rogers	246	14.3	
Majority			13.8	
Turnout			45.0	
Independent win (new seat)				
