= Hywel Teifi Edwards =

Welsh academic and historian (1934–2010)

- Born: 15 October 1934; Aberarth, Ceredigion, Wales
- Died: 4 January 2010 (aged 75); Llanelli, Carmarthenshire, Wales
- Education: University College of Wales, Aberystwyth
- Occupations: Academic; broadcaster; author
- Political party: Plaid Cymru
- Spouse: Aerona
- Children: 2, including Huw

Hywel Teifi Edwards (15 October 1934 – 4 January 2010) was a Welsh academic and historian, a prominent Welsh nationalist, a broadcaster and an author in the Welsh language. He was the father of former BBC journalist Huw Edwards.

== Early life ==
Born and raised in Aberarth, Cardiganshire, Edwards attended Aberaeron County School and the University College of Wales, Aberystwyth.

== Career ==
Edwards taught Welsh at Garw Grammar School, Pontycymer, where he met his wife Aerona Protheroe, before joining the Adult Education Department at University College of Swansea as a tutor in Welsh literature. He became a professor and head of the Welsh Language department before resigning. Their two children are Huw Edwards and Meinir Edwards (now Meinir Krishnasamy). He subsequently became an extramural lecturer in Welsh literature at University College of Swansea, and later Professor and Head of the Welsh Department.

He retired from full-time teaching in 1995 but continued to lecture and write books. He specialised in 19th century history, and was the leading authority on the history of the National Eisteddfod of Wales.

Tudur Hallam won the chair at the 2010 National Eisteddfod in Blaenau Gwent for his awdl (poem) in memory of Hywel Teifi, who had been his mentor.

== Politics ==
He frequently appeared on Welsh language radio and TV. Edwards stood twice for Plaid Cymru as a parliamentary candidate, in Llanelli in 1983 and Carmarthen in 1987. He represented Llangennech on Dyfed County Council for 14 years.

He died on 4 January 2010 in Tŷ Bryngwyn Hospice in Llanelli after a short illness.

== Works ==
- Yr Eisteddfod 1176–1976, Gomer Press (1976)
- Gŵyl Gwalia: Yr Eisteddfod yn Oes Aur Victoria 1858–1868, Gomer Press (1980)
- Codi'r hen wlad yn ei hol, 1850–1914, Gomer Press (1989)
- Eisteddfod Ffair y Byd, Chicago, 1893, Gomer Press (1990)
- Arwr glew erwau'r glo, 1850–1950, Gomer Press (1994)
- O'r pentre gwyn i Gwmderi, Gomer Press (2004)
- Hanes Eglwys Bryn Seion, Llangennech (2007)
- The National Pageant of Wales, Gomer Press (2009)
