= 2017 Carmarthenshire County Council election =

Welsh local election

- 4 May 2017

All 74 seats to Carmarthenshire County Council 37 seats needed for a majority
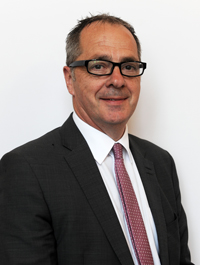
	First party	Second party	Third party
		Lab	Ind
Leader	Emlyn Dole	Jeff Edmunds
Party	Plaid Cymru	Labour	Independent
Leader's seat	Llannon	Bigyn
Last election	28 seats, 37.8%	23 seats, 31.1%	23 seats, 29.7%
Seats won	36	22	16
Seat change	▲8	▼1	▼7
Popular vote	31,215	24,358	18,313
Percentage	38.5%	30.0%	12.6%
Swing	▲2.5%	▲6.8%	▼21.3%
- Results of the 2017 Carmarthenshire County Council election
Council control before election
Plaid Cymru and Independent coalition
Council control after election
Plaid Cymru and Independent coalition

The sixth election to Carmarthenshire County Council was held on 4 May 2017 as part of wider local elections across Wales. The election was preceded by the 2012 election. It was followed by the 2022 election

Plaid Cymru narrowly missed out in forming the first majority administration in Carmarthenshire Council's history, despite gaining eight seats in the election. The Labour Party maintained its position from the 2012-2017 term, with the Independents losing many seats in the rural areas of Carmarthenshire to Plaid Cymru. Four candidates (from the seventy four seats) were elected unopposed.

A Plaid Cymru-Independent coalition was formed after the election, with Emlyn Dole remaining as the Leader of Council.

== Results Overview ==
No Overall Control Retained

Carmarthenshire County Council election result 2017
Party	Seats	Gains	Losses	Net gain/loss	Seats %	Votes %	Votes	+/−
Plaid Cymru	36	11	3	+8	48.6	38.5	31,215	+2.5
Labour	22	6	6	0	29.7	30.0	24,358	+6.8
Independent	16	1	8	-7	21.6	12.6	18,313	-21.3
Conservative	0	0	0	0	0.0	5.4	4,342	+2.5
UKIP	0	0	0	0	0.0	1.6	1,296	New
Liberal Democrats	0	0	0	0	0.0	1.0	842	0.0
TUSC	0	0	0	0	0.0	0.16	135	+0.1
Green	0	0	0	0	0.0	0.13	109	+0.1

== Ward results ==
=== Abergwili (one seat) ===
Abergwili 2017
Party	Candidate	Votes	%	±%
Plaid Cymru	Dorian Williams	622	60%	+17.9
Independent	Lisa Fearn	448	40%	−17.9
Majority		214	19%	
Turnout		1110		
Plaid Cymru gain from Independent		Swing		

=== Ammanford (one seat) ===
Ammanford 2017
Party	Candidate	Votes	%	±%
Plaid Cymru	Deian Harries*	613	67%	+16
Labour	Paula Treharne	298	33%	−15
Majority		315		
Turnout		911	34%	
Plaid Cymru hold		Swing		

=== Betws (one seat) ===
Betws 2017
Party	Candidate	Votes	%	±%
Plaid Cymru	Betsan Jones	402	51%	+20.4
Labour	Ryan Bartlett*	309	39.2%	−3.9
UKIP	Krishna Seunarine	77	9.7%	+9.7
Majority		93	11.8	
Turnout		788		
Plaid Cymru gain from Labour		Swing		

=== Bigyn (two seats) ===
Bigyn 2017
Party	Candidate	Votes	%	±%
Labour	Jeff Edmunds*	610	19.8%	
Labour	Eryl Morgan*	575	18.7%	
Independent	Terry Morris	428	13.9%	
Independent	Nigel Bevan	414	13.4%	
Plaid Cymru	Michael Burns	333	10.8%	
Plaid Cymru	Kathryn Lodge	304	9.9%	
Conservative	Robert Thomas	236	7.7%	
Independent	Stephen Bowen	181	5.9%	
Turnout		3081		
Labour hold		Swing		
Labour hold		Swing		

=== Burry Port (two seats) ===
Burry Port 2017
Party	Candidate	Votes	%	±%
Labour	John James*	825		
Labour	Amanda Fox	728		
Independent	Mike Theodoulu	548		
Independent	Lisa Mitchell	412		
Conservative	Tomos Lloyd-Evans	237		
Turnout			44.5	
Labour hold		Swing		
Labour hold		Swing		

=== Bynea (one seat) ===
Bynea 2017
Party	Candidate	Votes	%	±%
Labour	Deryk Cundy*	539		
Plaid Cymru	Ian Wooldridge	373		
Conservative	Ceri Alan Morris	218		
Independent	Dai Hughes	49		
Majority				
Turnout				
Labour hold		Swing		

=== Carmarthen Town North (two seats) ===
Carmarthen Town North 2017
Party	Candidate	Votes	%	±%
Labour	Kenneth Lloyd	805		
Plaid Cymru	Peter Hughes Griffiths*	765		
Plaid Cymru	Gareth Jones*	581		
Independent	Les Clark	489		
Turnout				
Labour gain from Plaid Cymru		Swing		
Plaid Cymru hold		Swing		

=== Carmarthen Town South (two seats) ===
Carmarthen Town South 2017
Party	Candidate	Votes	%	±%
Plaid Cymru	Gareth John	551		
Plaid Cymru	Alun Lenny*	493		
Conservative	Charlie Evans	399		
Labour	Philip Grice	361		
Independent	Barry Williams	303		
Turnout				
Plaid Cymru hold		Swing		
Plaid Cymru hold		Swing		

=== Carmarthen Town West (two seats) ===
Carmarthen Town West 2017
Party	Candidate	Votes	%	±%
Plaid Cymru	Emlyn Schiavone	739		
Plaid Cymru	Alan Speake*	661		
Independent	Arthur Davies	510		
Independent	Russell Sparks	454		
Labour	Matthew Thomas	255		
Labour	Julia Ault	238		
Turnout				
Plaid Cymru hold		Swing		
Plaid Cymru hold		Swing		

=== Cenarth (one seat) ===
Cenarth 2017
Party	Candidate	Votes	%	±%
Plaid Cymru	Hazel Evans*	712		
Liberal Democrats	Philip Gibbons	115		
Majority				
Plaid Cymru hold		Swing		

=== Cilycwm (one seat) ===
Plaid Cymru had gained Cilycwm at a by-election following the death of the previous Independent member. However, the party did not field a candidate resulting in the seat being captured by an independent, who had finished second at the by-election.

Cilycwm 2017
Party	Candidate	Votes	%	±%
Independent	Arwel Davies	307		
Labour	Maria Carroll	284		
Independent	Matthew Paul	191		
Independent gain from Plaid Cymru		Swing		

=== Cynwyl Elfed (one seat) ===
Cynwyl Elfed 2017
Party	Candidate	Votes	%	±%
Independent	Irfon Jones*	804		
Plaid Cymru	Glyn Evans	584		
Independent hold		Swing		

=== Cynwyl Gaeo (one seat) ===
Cynwyl Elfed 2017
Party	Candidate	Votes	%	±%
Plaid Cymru	Eirwyn Williams*	434		
Conservative	Steven Holmes	267		
Plaid Cymru hold		Swing		

=== Dafen (one seat) ===
Dafen 2017
Party	Candidate	Votes	%	±%
Independent	Rob Evans	508		
Labour	Tegwen Devichand*	452		
Majority				
Independent gain from Labour		Swing		

=== Elli (one seat) ===
Elli 2017
Party	Candidate	Votes	%	±%
Independent	John Jenkins*	442	41.4	−11.3
Labour	David Darkin	273	25.6	+5.5
Conservative	Siôn Davies	210	19.7	+14.1
Plaid Cymru	Ruth Price	142	13.3	−8.0
Majority		169		
Independent hold		Swing		

=== Felinfoel (one seat) ===
Felinfoel 2017
Party	Candidate	Votes	%	±%
Labour	Bill Thomas	269		
Independent	Hugh Richards*	185		
Conservative	Julia Evans	94		
Majority				
Labour gain from Independent		Swing		

=== Garnant (one seat) ===
Garnant 2017
Party	Candidate	Votes	%	±%
Labour	Kevin Madge*	494		
Plaid Cymru	Nigel Jerrett	167		
Labour hold		Swing		

=== Glanamman (one seat) ===
Glanamman 2017
Party	Candidate	Votes	%	±%
Plaid Cymru	David Jenkins*	413		
Labour	Emyr Jenkins	375		
Plaid Cymru hold		Swing		

=== Glanymor (two seats) ===
Glanymor 2017
Party	Candidate	Votes	%	±%
Labour	Louvain Roberts*	702		
Labour	John Prosser	537		
Plaid Cymru	Sean Rees	536		
Independent	John Jones	333		
Plaid Cymru	George Herbert	328		
Independent	Alison Carter	280		
Independent	Chris Wilson	182		
Labour gain from Plaid Cymru		Swing		
Labour hold		Swing		

=== Glyn (one seat) ===
Glyn 2017
Party	Candidate	Votes	%	±%
Independent	Thomas James Jones*	323		
Plaid Cymru	John Williams	251		
Labour	Stephen Donoghue	168		
Conservative	James Hogg	98		
Majority				
Independent hold		Swing		

=== Gorslas (two seats) ===
Gorslas 2017
Party	Candidate	Votes	%	±%
Plaid Cymru	Darren Price*	1,051		
Plaid Cymru	Aled Owen	941		
Labour	Wynne Jones	431		
Labour	Gary Jones	311		
Conservative	Anthony Frost	283		
Independent	Brian Kirby	169		
Plaid Cymru hold		Swing		
Plaid Cymru gain from Labour		Swing		

=== Hendy (one seat) ===
Hendy 2017
Party	Candidate	Votes	%	±%
Plaid Cymru	Gareth Thomas*	432		
Labour	Steve Lloyd-Janes	385		
Conservative	Vanda Williams	158		
Independent	David Erasmus	77		
UKIP	Keith Perry	59		
Majority				
Plaid Cymru hold		Swing		

=== Hengoed (two seats) ===
Hengoed 2017
Party	Candidate	Votes	%	±%
Labour	Penelope Edwards*	408		
Plaid Cymru	Susan Phillips	394		
Independent	Siân Mair Caiach*	372		
Labour	Keith Davies	322		
Plaid Cymru	Martin Davies	315		
Independent	Clifford Jones	304		
Conservative	Kevin Flynn	230		
Labour hold		Swing		
Plaid Cymru gain from Blaenau Gwent PV		Swing		

=== Kidwelly (one seat) ===
Kidwelly 2017
Party	Candidate	Votes	%	±%
Plaid Cymru	Sarah Gilasbey	623		
Labour	Philip Thompson	556		
Green	David Edwards	109		
Majority				
Plaid Cymru gain from Labour		Swing		

=== Laugharne Township (one seat) ===
Laugharne Township 2017
Party	Candidate	Votes	%	±%
Independent	Jane Tremlett*	382		
Plaid Cymru	Abi Thomas	300		
Independent	Don Avery	273		
Labour	Steve Morris	134		
Majority				
Independent hold		Swing		

=== Llanboidy (one seat) ===
Llanboidy 2017
Party	Candidate	Votes	%	±%
Plaid Cymru	Dorian Phillips	504		
Independent	Ellis Wyn Evans	259		
Independent	Lionel Phillips	142		
Labour	Jean Myers	127		
Majority				
Plaid Cymru hold		Swing		

=== Llanddarog (one seat) ===
Llanddarog 2017
Party	Candidate	Votes	%	±%
Plaid Cymru	Ann Davies	unopposed		
Plaid Cymru gain from Independent		Swing		

=== Llandeilo (one seat) ===
Llandeilo 2017
Party	Candidate	Votes	%	±%
Independent	Edward Thomas*	798		
Liberal Democrats	Lesley Prosser	268		
Plaid Cymru	Keri Lewis	249		
Conservative	David Hayes	77		
Majority				
Turnout				
Independent hold		Swing		

=== Llandovery (one seat) ===
Llandovery 2017
Party	Candidate	Votes	%	±%
Plaid Cymru	Handel Davies	583		
Labour	David Long	240		
Liberal Democrats	Julian Dutton	124		
UKIP	Clifford Johnson	75		
Majority				
Turnout				
Plaid Cymru gain from Independent		Swing		

=== Llandybie (two seats) ===
Llandybie 2017
Party	Candidate	Votes	%	±%
Independent	Anthony Davies*	744		
Plaid Cymru	Dai Nicholas	725		
Labour	Anthony Wyn Jones*	500		
Plaid Cymru	Karen Davies	451		
Conservative	Sandra Morgan	165		
UKIP	Nigel Humphreys	128		
Independent	Pat Jenkins	108		
Independent hold		Swing		
Plaid Cymru gain from Labour		Swing		

=== Llanegwad (one seat) ===
Llanegwad 2017
Party	Candidate	Votes	%	±%
Plaid Cymru	Mansel Charles*	754		
Liberal Democrats	Monica French	231		
Independent	George Reid	169		
UKIP	Carol Jones	70		
Majority				
Plaid Cymru hold		Swing		

=== Llanfihangel Aberbythych (one seat) ===
Llanfihangel Aberbythych 2017
Party	Candidate	Votes	%	±%
Plaid Cymru	Cefin Campbell*	635		
UKIP	Richard Hart	121		
Majority				
Turnout		514		
Plaid Cymru hold		Swing		

=== Llanfihangel-ar-Arth (one seat) ===
Llanfihangel-ar-Arth 2017
Party	Candidate	Votes	%	±%
Plaid Cymru	Linda Evans*	unopposed		
Plaid Cymru hold		Swing		

=== Llangadog (one seat) ===
Llangadog 2017
Party	Candidate	Votes	%	±%
Independent	Andrew James*	421		
Independent	John Morgan	309		
Plaid Cymru	Elizabeth Barlow	240		
Liberal Democrats	Christopher Fischer	54		
Majority		112		
Independent hold		Swing		

=== Llangeler (one seat) ===
Llangeler 2017
Party	Candidate	Votes	%	±%
Plaid Cymru	Ken Howell*	930		
Independent	John Wigley	481		
Majority		449		
Plaid Cymru hold		Swing		

=== Llangennech (two seats) ===
Llangennech 2017
Party	Candidate	Votes	%	±%
Labour	Gary Jones	747		
Plaid Cymru	Gwyneth Thomas*	731		
Labour	Jacqueline Seward	675		
Plaid Cymru	Ian Williams	602		
Conservative	Paul Lockwood	335		
Labour gain from Plaid Cymru		Swing		
Plaid Cymru hold		Swing		

=== Llangunnor (one seat) ===
Llangunnor 2017
Party	Candidate	Votes	%	±%
Plaid Cymru	Elwyn Williams*	587		
Labour	Michael Maynard	357		
Independent	David Watson	181		
Majority		220		
Plaid Cymru hold		Swing		

=== Llangyndeyrn (one seat) ===
Llangyndeyrn 2017
Party	Candidate	Votes	%	±%
Plaid Cymru	Tyssul Evans*	825	68%	−10.0
Labour	Sion Davies	393	32%	+32.0
Majority		432	35.6	−27.3
Plaid Cymru hold		Swing		

=== Llannon (two seats) ===
Llannon 2017
Party	Candidate	Votes	%	±%
Plaid Cymru	Emlyn Dole*	701		
Labour	Dot Jones	585		
Labour	Margaret Thomas*	576		
Plaid Cymru	Philip Williams	486		
Independent	Alun Owens	470		
TUSC	Rob Owen	135		
Plaid Cymru hold		Swing		
Labour hold		Swing		

=== Llansteffan (one seat) ===
Llansteffan 2017
Party	Candidate	Votes	%	±%
Plaid Cymru	Carys Jones	596		
Independent	Roger Van Praet	290		
Independent	Hywel Wyn Thomas	113		
Majority				
Plaid Cymru gain from Independent		Swing		

=== Llanybydder (one seat) ===
Llanybydder 2017
Party	Candidate	Votes	%	±%
Independent	Ieuan Wyn Davies*	unopposed		
Independent hold		Swing		

=== Lliedi (two seats) ===
Lliedi 2017
Party	Candidate	Votes	%	±%
Labour	Rob James	890		
Labour	Shahana Najmi	629		
Conservative	Stephen Davies	312		
Plaid Cymru	Colin Jones	264		
Plaid Cymru	Dyfrig Thomas	244		
Conservative	Stefan Ryszewski	191		
UKIP	Bramwell Richards	184		
Labour hold		Swing		
Labour hold		Swing		

=== Llwynhendy (two seats) ===
Llwynhendy 2017
Party	Candidate	Votes	%	±%
Labour	Fozia Akhtar	582		
Labour	Sharen Davies*	574		
Independent	Theresa Bowen*	275		
Plaid Cymru	Meilyr Hughes	154		
Plaid Cymru	Robert Davies	150		
Independent	Amy Evans	135		
UKIP	Kenneth Rees	133		
Conservative	Ruth Elvins	119		
Labour hold		Swing		
Labour gain from Independent		Swing		

=== Manordeilo and Salem (one seat) ===
Manordeilo and Salem 2017
Party	Candidate	Votes	%	±%
Independent	Joseph Davies	479		
Plaid Cymru	Rhys Thomas	460		
Liberal Democrats	Catherine Nakilieny	50		
Majority		19		
Independent hold		Swing		

=== Pembrey (two seats) ===
Pembrey 2017
Party	Candidate	Votes	%	±%
Independent	Hugh Shepardson*	845		
Labour	Shirley Matthews*	838		
Plaid Cymru	Peter Anthony Freeman	491		
Labour	Bob Walpole	352		
Independent hold		Swing		
Labour hold		Swing		

=== Pen-y-groes (one seat) ===
Pen-y-groes 2017
Party	Candidate	Votes	%	±%
Plaid Cymru	Dai Thomas	582		
Labour	Paul Blackwell	259		
UKIP	Timothy Dean	150		
Majority		323		

=== Pontamman (one seat) ===
Pontamman 2017
Party	Candidate	Votes	%	±%
Labour	Colin Evans*	675		
Plaid Cymru	Trevor Smith	333		
UKIP	Barry Wiltshire	60		
Majority		342		
Labour hold		Swing		

=== Pontyberem (one seat) ===
Pontyberem 2017
Party	Candidate	Votes	%	±%
Plaid Cymru	Liam Bowen	660		
Labour	William Skinner	236		
UKIP	Keith Evans	184		
Majority		424		
Plaid Cymru hold		Swing		

=== Quarter Bach (one seat) ===
Quarter Bach 2017
Party	Candidate	Votes	%	±%
Plaid Cymru	Glynog Davies*	626		
Labour	Tom Addey	398		
Majority		228		
Plaid Cymru hold		Swing		

=== St Clears (one seat) ===
St Clears 2017
Party	Candidate	Votes	%	±%
Independent	Philip Hughes*	942		
Plaid Cymru	Rhodri Glyn Thomas	283		
Majority		659		
Independent hold		Swing		

=== St Ishmaels (one seat) ===
St Ishmaels 2017
Party	Candidate	Votes	%	±%
Independent	Mair Stephens*	539		
Plaid Cymru	Meinir Wynn James	447		
Conservative	Susan Webb	193		
Independent hold		Swing		

=== Saron (two seats) ===
Saron 2017
Party	Candidate	Votes	%	±%
Plaid Cymru	Alun Davies*	810		
Plaid Cymru	Carl Harris	679		
Labour	Peter Cooper*	588		
Labour	Stephen Jeacock	439		
Conservative	David Jones	240		
Conservative	Nia Owen-Lloyd	181		
Plaid Cymru gain from Labour		Swing		
Plaid Cymru hold		Swing		

=== Swiss Valley (one seat) ===
Swiss Valley 2017
Party	Candidate	Votes	%	±%
Independent	Anthony Morgan*	498		
Labour	Paul Harris	272		
Plaid Cymru	Jordan Randall	76		
Conservative	Betty Jones	99		
Majority		226		
Independent hold		Swing		

=== Trelech (one seat) ===
Plaid Cymru had won the seat from the Independents at a by-election.

Trelech 2017
Party	Candidate	Votes	%	±%
Plaid Cymru	Jean Lewis*	unopposed		
Plaid Cymru hold		Swing		

=== Trimsaran (one seat) ===
Trimsaran 2017
Party	Candidate	Votes	%	±%
Plaid Cymru	Kim Broom	225		
Independent	Naomi Wilmot	216		
Labour	Lisa Williams	187		
Independent	Neil Burman	61		
Majority		9		
Plaid Cymru gain from Independent		Swing		

=== Tycroes (one seat) ===
Tycroes 2017
Party	Candidate	Votes	%	±%
Labour	Tina Higgins	534		
Plaid Cymru	Mike Nicholas	388		
Majority		146		
Labour hold		Swing		

=== Tyisha (two seats) ===
Tyisha 2017
Party	Candidate	Votes	%	±%
Labour	Suzy Curry	543		
Labour	Andre McPherson	407		
Plaid Cymru	Terry Davies	362		
Independent	Jeff Owen*	288		
Plaid Cymru	Roger Price	189		
Labour gain from Plaid Cymru		Swing		
Labour hold		Swing		

=== Whitland (one seat) ===
Whitland 2017
Party	Candidate	Votes	%	±%
Independent	Sue Allen*	554		
Plaid Cymru	Natalie Jones	133		
Labour	Vivienne Morris	111		
UKIP	Bryan Haddon	55		
Majority		411		
Independent hold		Swing		

== By-Elections 2017-2022 ==
=== Saron by-election 2018 ===
A by-election was held in Saron on 19 July 2018 following the death of Plaid Cymru councillor Alun Davies. The seat was won by Plaid Cymru candidate Karen Davies.

Saron by-election 2018
Party	Candidate	Votes	%	±%
Plaid Cymru	Karen Davies	747	65.2	
Labour	Tom Fallows	239	20.9	
Conservative	Aled Crow	146	12.7	
Liberal Democrats	Caryl Tandy	140	1.2	
Majority		508	44.3	
Turnout		1,146		
Plaid Cymru hold		Swing		
