= 2012 Carmarthenshire County Council election =

Welsh local election

Results of the 2012 Carmarthenshire County Council election

The fifth election to Carmarthenshire County Council was held on 1 May 2012. It was preceded by the 2008 election and was followed by the 2017 election. Plaid Cymru won 28 seats whilst Labour and the Independents won 23 each. The main feature of the election was a Labour recovery in the Llanelli area, and to some extent in the Gwendraeth and Ammanford area also, mainly at the expense of Independent candidates. Plaid Cymru lost ground to Labour in the Llanelli area but gained seats elsewhere, becoming the largest party. An Independent-Labour coalition was again formed, but with Labour as the leading partner. As a result, Kevin Madge replaced Meryl Gravell as the leader of the council.

Madge resigned as leader of the council in May 2015, having lost the leadership of the Labour group. Two days later it was announced that Plaid Cymru would from a coalition with the Independents. Emlyn Dole was elected leader of the council.

== Results Overview ==
No Overall Control (unchanged)

Carmarthenshire County Council election result 2012
Party	Seats	Gains	Losses	Net gain/loss	Seats %	Votes %	Votes	+/−
Plaid Cymru	28	7	9	-2	37.8	36.0	23,798	0.0
Independent	22	1	11	-10	29.7	33.9	22,403	-4.0
Labour	23	14	2	+12	31.1	23.2	15,350	+0.7
People First	1	1	0	+1	1.4	3.0	1,965	New
Conservative	0	0	0	0	0.0	2.9	1,914	+1.2
Liberal Democrats	0	0	1	-1	0.0	1.0	675	-0.3
BNP	-	-	-	-	-	-	-	-0.4
Ratepayers	-	-	-	-	-	-	-	-0.1

== Ward Results ==
=== Abergwili (one seat) ===
Abergwili 2012
Party	Candidate	Votes	%	±%
Independent	Pamela Ann Palmer*	600	57.9	−18.5
Plaid Cymru	Dewi Richard Evans	436	42.1	+18.5
Majority		164	15.8	−37.0
Turnout			56.5	
Independent hold		Swing	18.5	

=== Ammanford (one seat) ===
Deian Harries had come within six votes of victory for Plaid Cymru in 2008. The sitting Labour member, Hugh Evans, a member of the authority since its formation in 1995, stood down and Plaid Cymru captured the seat.

Ammanford 2012
Party	Candidate	Votes	%	±%
Plaid Cymru	Alun Deian Harries	480		
Labour	Chris Jones	455		
Majority		25		
Turnout			48.3	
Plaid Cymru gain from Labour		Swing		

=== Betws (one seat) ===
Labour, which had held the seat from 1995 until 2008, came from third place to recapture Betws with a new candidate

Betws 2012
Party	Candidate	Votes	%	±%
Labour	David John Ryan Bartlett	325		
Independent	Eira Audrey Jones*	274		
Plaid Cymru	Annette Price	155		
Majority		51		
Turnout			44.3	
Labour gain from Independent		Swing		

=== Bigyn (two seats) ===
Labour, having held all seats in Bigyn from 1995 until 2008, regained both on a low turnout. Eryl Morgan was previously county councillor for Hengoed.

Bigyn 2012
Party	Candidate	Votes	%	±%
Labour	Eryl Morgan	609		
Labour	Jeff Edmunds	565		
Plaid Cymru	Michael Burns*	523		
Plaid Cymru	Dyfrig Thomas*	518		
Independent	Nigel Bevan	401		
People First	Stephen Royston Bowen	287		
Turnout			33.3	
Labour gain from Plaid Cymru		Swing		
Labour gain from Plaid Cymru		Swing		

=== Burry Port (two seats) ===
Pat Jones, a member of the authority since 1999, was re-elected alongside another Labour candidate who narrowly ousted the sitting Independent member, who had served since 2004. The Conservative candidate had stood as a Liberal Democrat in 1999.

Burry Port 2012
Party	Candidate	Votes	%	±%
Labour	Patricia Ethel Mary Jones*	741		
Labour	John David James	634		
Independent	Stephen Randall James*	622		
Plaid Cymru	Gaynor Davies	388		
Conservative	Pam Every	239		
Turnout			44.5	
Labour hold		Swing		
Labour gain from Independent		Swing		

=== Bynea (one seat) ===
On a very low turnout, Labour came from third place to take a seat held by the Independent candidate, a member of the cabinet, since 2004.

Bynea 2012
Party	Candidate	Votes	%	±%
Labour	Deryk Michael Cundy	445		
Independent	Gwynne Harris Woolridge*	328		
People First	Michelle Williams	179		
Majority		117		
Turnout			23.6	
Labour gain from Independent		Swing		

=== Carmarthen Town North (two seats) ===
Plaid Cymru again held both seats, for the third successive election.

Carmarthen Town North 2012
Party	Candidate	Votes	%	±%
Plaid Cymru	Peter Hughes Griffiths*	824		
Plaid Cymru	Gareth Owen Jones*	657		
Independent	Michael Stewart Elias	501		
Labour	Douglas Edmund Ynyr Richards Rose	480		
Independent	Paschal Haughey	201		
Turnout			38.8	
Plaid Cymru hold		Swing		
Plaid Cymru hold		Swing		

=== Carmarthen Town South (two seats) ===
Plaid Cymru held both seats in this ward for the first time, unseating an Independent member who had served for one term. Jeffrey Thomas had represented Carmarthen North from 2004 until 2008.

Carmarthen Town South 2012
Party	Candidate	Votes	%	±%
Plaid Cymru	Alun John Edwin Lenny	454		
Plaid Cymru	Jeffrey Thomas	441		
Independent	Jenny Fox	398		
Labour	Philip William Grice	319		
Independent	Stephen Paul Dunn*	285		
People First	Gabrielle Diana Sheppard	116		
Turnout				
Plaid Cymru hold		Swing		
Plaid Cymru gain from Independent		Swing		

=== Carmarthen Town West (two seats) ===
Plaid Cymru completed a clean sweep of all seats in Carmarthen Town by ousting Arthur Davies, a leading figure in People First, former Labour councillor and a member of the authority since 1999.

Carmarthen Town West 2008
Party	Candidate	Votes	%	±%
Plaid Cymru	Alan Douglas Thomas Speake*	888		
Plaid Cymru	Tom Talog Defis	658		
People First	Arthur Davies*	512		
Independent	Barry Williams	261		
Independent	Marc Scaife	123		
Turnout			34.0	
Plaid Cymru hold		Swing		
Plaid Cymru gain from Other parties		Swing		

=== Cenarth (one seat) ===
Hazel Evans had captured the seat in a by-election following the death of the previous Independent member, Haydn Jones.

Cenarth 2012
Party	Candidate	Votes	%	±%
Plaid Cymru	Hazel Anna Louise Evans*	670		
Conservative	Henrietta Elizabeth Hensher	97		
Majority		573		
Plaid Cymru hold		Swing		

=== Cilycwm (one seat) ===
Tom Theophilus, who had represented the area for decades narrowly held the seat against one of the most prominent opponents of the previous administration and a leading critic of Mark James, the Chief Executive of the Council.

Cilycwm 2012
Party	Candidate	Votes	%	±%
Independent	Thomas Theophilus*	307		
Independent	Jacqui Thomapson	264		
Conservative	Matthew Graham Paul	136		
Independent hold		Swing		

=== Cynwyl Elfed (one seat) ===
Irfon Jones had represented Newchurch from 1995 until 1999 but was defeated by Dorrien Thomas when the enlarged Cynwyl Elfed ward was created following boundary changes. Thomas retired at this election and Jones won a narrow victory over Plaid Cymru.

Cynwyl Elfed 2012
Party	Candidate	Votes	%	±%
Independent	Henry Irfon Jones	678		
Plaid Cymru	Glyn Evans	631		
Independent	John Clarke Atkinson	149		
Independent hold		Swing		

=== Cynwyl Gaeo (one seat) ===
Eirwyn Williams, a member of the authority since 1995, was comfortably re-elected.

Cynwyl Gaeo 2012
Party	Candidate	Votes	%	±%
Plaid Cymru	James Eirwyn Williams*	502		
Conservative	Syed Murtaza Hasan	117		
Plaid Cymru hold		Swing		

=== Dafen (one seat) ===
Labour won by a large majority although Plaid Cymru's vote may have been affected by the decision of their former candidate, Clem Thomas, to stand for People First.

Dafen 2012
Party	Candidate	Votes	%	±%
Labour	Tegwen Devichand*	513		
Plaid Cymru	Mohammad Alam Choudry	178		
People First	Clem Thomas	131		
Independent	Dai Hughes	90		
Majority		130		
Labour hold		Swing		

=== Elli (one seat) ===
One-time Conservative John Paul Jenkins was returned for a third term with a much increased majority in a seat which has traditionally changed hands on a regular basis. The Liberal Democrats who once held the seat failed to field a candidate.

Elli 2012
Party	Candidate	Votes	%	±%
Independent	John Paul Jenkins*	503	52.7	
Plaid Cymru	Ruth Ferris Price	203	21.3	
Labour	Lilian Helen Rees	192	20.1	
Conservative	Janine Edana Phillips	56	5.9	
Majority		300		
Independent hold		Swing		

=== Felinfoel (one seat) ===
The sitting member, first elected in 2004, held his seat against the former Labour member who was elected in 1995 and 1999.

Felinfoel 2012
Party	Candidate	Votes	%	±%
Independent	David William Hugh Richards*	258		
Labour	Henry John Evans	215		
Plaid Cymru	Malcolm Cotterell	82		
Majority		43		
Independent hold		Swing		

=== Garnant (one seat) ===
Labour's leader on the authority increased his majority.

Garnant 2012
Party	Candidate	Votes	%	±%
Labour	Kevin Madge*	520		
Plaid Cymru	Emyr Williams	149		
Labour hold		Swing		

=== Glanamman (one seat) ===
The sitting Plaid member, who gained the seat in 2008, increased his majority.

Glanamman 2012
Party	Candidate	Votes	%	±%
Plaid Cymru	David Michael Jenkins*	478		
Labour	Shahid Hussain	248		
Plaid Cymru hold		Swing		

=== Glanymor (two seats) ===
In a ward that returned only Labour councillors from 1995 until 2008, Winston Lemon held his seat for Plaid Cymru and Labour regained the second seat from the Independents. David Tucker, a Labour councillor before 2008 and Keith Skivington, who stood in 2008 for Plaid Cymru, both contested the election as Independents which made the contest more unpredictable.

Glanymor 2012
Party	Candidate	Votes	%	±%
Plaid Cymru	Winston James Lemon*	571		
Labour	Beatrice Alice Louvain Roberts	520		
Labour	Joanne Yeo	485		
Plaid Cymru	John David Martin	342		
Independent	John Evan Jones*	298		
Independent	David Allan Tucker	240		
Independent	Keith Skivington	108		
Plaid Cymru hold		Swing		
Labour gain from Independent		Swing		

=== Glyn (one seat) ===
Jim Jones, the representative since 1999, won by a large margin.

Glyn 2012
Party	Candidate	Votes	%	±%
Independent	Thomas James Jones*	520		
Labour	Shahana Najmi	126		
Conservative	Tomos Arthur Lloyd-Evans	97		
Majority		394		
Independent hold		Swing		

=== Gorslas (two seats) ===
Terry Davies, the member since 2004, held one seat but the second seat was captured by Plaid Cymru, their first success in the ward. Clive Scourfield, the sitting Independent, stood down and there were press reports that Rupert Moon, former Llanelli and wales scrum-half was his chosen successor. Scourfield denied this to be the case and Moon was unsuccessful as the Independent vote was fragmented.

Gorslas 2012
Party	Candidate	Votes	%	±%
Labour	Terry Davies*	850		
Plaid Cymru	Darren Price	762		
Independent	Rupert Moon	508		
Independent	Ellis Davies	486		
Independent	Andrew John Lewis	253		
Labour hold		Swing		
Plaid Cymru gain from Independent		Swing		

=== Hendy (one seat) ===
Labour had gained this seat against the tide in 2008 and the result was now reversed.

Hendy 2012
Party	Candidate	Votes	%	±%
Plaid Cymru	Gareth Beynon Thomas	422		
Labour	Steve Lloyd-Janes*	411		
Independent	David Davies	198		
Majority		11		
Plaid Cymru gain from Labour		Swing		

=== Hengoed (two seats) ===
Sian Caiach, who took a seat for Plaid Cymru, subsequently left the party and joined People First following an internal dispute. Plaid also lost the second seat to Labour in a closely fought contest.

Hengoed 2012
Party	Candidate	Votes	%	±%
Labour	George Edwards	338		
People's Voice	Sian Mair Caiach*	337		
Plaid Cymru	Martin Vaughan Davies	315		
Plaid Cymru	Mike Evans	271		
Labour	Sue Lewis	253		
Independent	Fred Roberts	213		
	Heidi Lewis	89		
People First hold		Swing		
Labour gain from Plaid Cymru		Swing		

=== Kidwelly (one seat) ===
Labour strengthened the hold on a seat won against the tide in 2008.

Kidwelly 2012
Party	Candidate	Votes	%	±%
Labour	Keith Davies*	571		
People First	Huw Gilasbey	300		
Independent	Fran Lloyd-Burke	238		
	Ray Davies	177		
Majority		271		
Labour hold		Swing		

=== Laugharne Township (one seat) ===
Jane Tremlett had held the seat since 2004 and held on by a large majority as there was no Conservative candidate as was the case in 2008.

Laugharne Township 2012
Party	Candidate	Votes	%	±%
Independent	Jane Tremlett	714		
Labour	Jean Margaret Myers	228		
Majority		486		
Independent hold		Swing		

=== Llanboidy (one seat) ===
Roy Llewellyn had been a county councillor since 1989 on the Dyfed and Carmarthenshire authorities. He was unopposed in 2008 but was run close on this occasion by an Independent, as had been the case in 2004.

Llanboidy 2012
Party	Candidate	Votes	%	±%
Plaid Cymru	Daniel James Roy Llewellyn*	444		
Independent	Mark Davies	393		
Majority		51		
Plaid Cymru hold		Swing		

=== Llanddarog (one seat) ===
On a relatively high turnout, Wyn Evans was challenged for the first time for many years.

Llanddarog 2012
Party	Candidate	Votes	%	±%
Independent	William John Wyn Evans*	516		
Plaid Cymru	Simon David Martin	444		
Majority		72		
Turnout			54.9	
Independent hold		Swing		

=== Llandeilo (one seat) ===
A close contest followed the retirement of Ieuan Jones, the member since 1999. The Conservative vote was much less than that achieved by Juliana Hughes in 2008.

Llandeilo 2012
Party	Candidate	Votes	%	±%
Independent	Edward Gwynne Thomas	476		
Independent	Mike Williams	436		
Plaid Cymru	David Williams	299		
Conservative	Anthony Howard Frost	66		
Majority		40		
Turnout			56.1	
Independent hold		Swing		

=== Llandovery Town (one seat) ===
Ivor Jackson had been unopposed in 2008 but held the seat comfortably against three opponents.

Llandovery Town 2012
Party	Candidate	Votes	%	±%
Independent	Ivor John Jackson*	518		
Conservative	Andrew David Morgan	208		
Plaid Cymru	Patricia Ann Dodd Racher	167		
Independent	Gill Wright	164		
Majority		310		
Turnout			50.1	
Independent hold		Swing		

=== Llandybie (two seats) ===
The two sitting members were returned.

Llandybie 2012
Party	Candidate	Votes	%	±%
Independent	William Richard Anthony Davies*	909		
Labour	Anthony Wyn Jones*	658		
Plaid Cymru	Karen Denise Lawrence Davies	489		
Independent	Nigel John Humphreys	188		
Independent	Clifford Roy Johnson	140		
Conservative	Sandra May Morgan	110		
Independent hold		Swing		
Labour hold		Swing		

=== Llanegwad (one seat) ===
Mansel Charles had stood as an Independent candidate at the previous election but had subsequently won the seat for Plaid Cymru at a by-election following the resignation of Independent councillor Dillwyn Williams.

Llanegwad and Llanfynydd 2012
Party	Candidate	Votes	%	±%
Plaid Cymru	John Mansel Charles*	612		
Independent	Clive Pugh	508		
Majority		104		
Plaid Cymru hold		Swing		

=== Llanfihangel Aberbythych (one seat) ===
The sitting member, Rhys Davies stood down and the seat was won by Cefin Campbell, former director of Welsh language initiative, Mentrau Iaith Myrddin.

Llanfihangel Aberbythych 2012
Party	Candidate	Votes	%	±%
Plaid Cymru	Cefin Arthur Campbell	468		
Independent	Winston Kenneth Griffiths	221		
Conservative	Tony Jukes	63		
Majority		247		
Turnout			52.8	
Plaid Cymru hold		Swing		

=== Llanfihangel-ar-Arth (one seat) ===
Llanfihangel-ar-Arth 2012
Party	Candidate	Votes	%	±%
Plaid Cymru	Linda Davies Evans*	1,074		
Conservative	Douglas Mearns Spragg	137		
Majority				
Turnout			55.4	
Plaid Cymru hold		Swing		

=== Llangadog (one seat) ===
Llangadog 2012
Party	Candidate	Votes	%	±%
Independent	Andrew James	475		
Independent	D. Huw Morgan*	439		
Plaid Cymru	Andre Jacob	89		
Majority				
Independent hold		Swing		

=== Llangeler (one seat) ===
Llangeler 2012
Party	Candidate	Votes	%	±%
Plaid Cymru	Ken Howell	793		
Independent	John Wigley	606		
Majority		187		
Plaid Cymru hold		Swing		

=== Llangennech (two seats) ===
Llangenench 2012
Party	Candidate	Votes	%	±%
Plaid Cymru	Gwyneth Thomas*	889		
Plaid Cymru	William Gwyn Hopkins*	757		
Labour	David Llewelyn Darkin	535		
Labour	Fozia Akhtar	439		
Plaid Cymru hold		Swing		
Plaid Cymru hold		Swing		

=== Llangunnor (one seat) ===
Llangunnor 2012
Party	Candidate	Votes	%	±%
Plaid Cymru	Dewi Elwyn Williams	573		
Independent	David John Watson	395		
Majority		178		
Plaid Cymru gain from Independent		Swing		

=== Llangyndeyrn (one seat) ===
Llangyndeyrn 2012
Party	Candidate	Votes	%	±%
Plaid Cymru	William Tyssul Evans*	863		
Independent	Mark Brown	162		
Independent	Robert Michael Beynon	91		
Majority		701		
Plaid Cymru hold		Swing		

=== Llannon (two seats) ===
Llannon 2012
Party	Candidate	Votes	%	±%
Plaid Cymru	Emlyn Dole*	630		
Labour	Margaret Kim Thomas	588		
Labour	Alan John Heneberry	548		
Plaid Cymru	Philip Meredith Williams*	499		
Independent	Alun George Owens	474		
Independent	Keith Thomas	230		
Plaid Cymru hold		Swing		
Labour gain from Plaid Cymru		Swing		

=== Llansteffan (one seat) ===
Llansteffan 2012
Party	Candidate	Votes	%	±%
Independent	Daff Davies*	543		
Plaid Cymru	Anne Carys Jones	538		
Majority		5		
Independent hold		Swing		

=== Llanybydder (one seat) ===
Ieuan Davies comfortably regained the seat he lost in 2008.

Llanybydder 2008
Party	Candidate	Votes	%	±%
Independent	Ieuan Wyn Davies	755		
Plaid Cymru	Fiona Hughes*	309		
Majority		446		
Independent gain from Plaid Cymru		Swing		

=== Lliedi (two seats) ===
Lliedi 2012
Party	Candidate	Votes	%	±%
Labour	William George Thomas	653		
Labour	Jan Williams	653		
Plaid Cymru	Tony Urqhuart	379		
Plaid Cymru	Tom McPhillips	356		
Liberal Democrats	Kenneth Denver Rees*	252		
Independent	William Edward Skinner	236		
Labour gain from Liberal Democrats		Swing		
Labour gain from Plaid Cymru		Swing		

=== Llwynhendy (two seats) ===
Llwynhendy 2012
Party	Candidate	Votes	%	±%
Labour	Sharen Davies	479		
Labour	Theresa Bowen	455		
Independent	Lindy Butler	332		
Plaid Cymru	Meilyr Bowen Hughes*	281		
Plaid Cymru	Ian Williams	255		
Independent	Carol Rees	91		
People First	John Willock	86		
Labour gain from Independent		Swing		
Labour gain from Plaid Cymru		Swing		

=== Manordeilo and Salem (one seat) ===
Manordeilo and Salem 2012
Party	Candidate	Votes	%	±%
Independent	Joseph Arthur Davies	560		
Plaid Cymru	Peter Eyre	227		
Conservative	Owen Williams	96		
Majority				
Independent hold		Swing		

=== Pembrey (two seats) ===
Pembrey 2012
Party	Candidate	Votes	%	±%
Independent	Hugh Barrie Shepardson*	738		
Labour	Shirley Matthews	612		
Plaid Cymru	David Malcolm Davies*	449		
Plaid Cymru	Joanna Mary Davies	376		
Independent hold		Swing		
Labour gain from Plaid Cymru		Swing		

=== Penygroes (one seat) ===
Penygroes
Party	Candidate	Votes	%	±%
Plaid Cymru	Siân Elisabeth Thomas*	344		
Labour	Bob Gunstone	338		
Independent	Aled Rees	139		
Conservative	Susan Freda Webb	92		
Majority		6		

=== Pontamman (one seat) ===
Pontamman 2012
Party	Candidate	Votes	%	±%
Labour	David Colin Evans	652		
Plaid Cymru	Marie Binney*	321		
Majority		331		
Labour gain from Plaid Cymru		Swing		

=== Pontyberem (one seat) ===
Pontyberem
Party	Candidate	Votes	%	±%
Plaid Cymru	Joy Williams*	576		
Labour	Raymond Jones	184		
Independent	Andrea Karen Gravell	152		
Conservative	Keith John Evans	142		
Majority				
Plaid Cymru hold		Swing		

=== Quarter Bach (one seat) ===
Quarter Bach
Party	Candidate	Votes	%	±%
Plaid Cymru	John Glynog Davies	619		
Labour	Elwyn Williams	452		
Majority				
Plaid Cymru hold		Swing		

=== St Clears (one seat) ===
St Clears
Party	Candidate	Votes	%	±%
Independent	Philip Morris Hughes*	682		
Independent	William Edmund Vincent John Davies	292		
Liberal Democrats	Selwyn John Runnett	273		
Majority				
Independent hold		Swing		

=== St Ishmaels (one seat) ===
St Ishmaels
Party	Candidate	Votes	%	±%
Independent	Lydia Mair Stephens*	587		
Plaid Cymru	Delme Bowen	496		
Independent hold		Swing		

=== Saron (two seats) ===
Saron 2012
Party	Candidate	Votes	%	±%
Labour	Alan Peter Cooper*	720		
Plaid Cymru	Alun Davies	616		
Plaid Cymru	Nigel Henry Evans	524		
Independent	Stephen Jeacock	365		
Conservative	David Hayes Webb	95		
Labour hold		Swing		
Plaid Cymru hold		Swing		

=== Swiss Valley (one seat) ===
Swiss Valley
Party	Candidate	Votes	%	±%
Independent	Anthony Giles Morgan*	430		
Labour	Bill Thomas	276		
Plaid Cymru	Rhydwyn Ifan	207		
Majority				
Independent hold		Swing		

=== Trelech (one seat) ===
Trelech 2012
Party	Candidate	Votes	%	±%
Independent	William David Thomas*	471		
Plaid Cymru	Anthony Thomas	321		
Liberal Democrats	Lindsay Jane Runnett	133		
Independent hold		Swing		

=== Trimsaran (one seat) ===
Trimsaran 2012
Party	Candidate	Votes	%	±%
Independent	Meryl Gravell*	323		
Plaid Cymru	Mark James	222		
Labour	Ryan Thomas	152		
Conservative	Lynn Jones	92		
People First	Dennis Simon Terrance Warwick	17		
Majority		101		
Independent hold		Swing		

=== Tycroes (one seat) ===
Tycroes
Party	Candidate	Votes	%	±%
Labour	Calum Higgins	384		
Plaid Cymru	Rhian Higgins	319		
Majority		65		
Labour hold		Swing		

=== Tyisha (two seats) ===
Tyisha 2012
Party	Candidate	Votes	%	±%
Plaid Cymru	Jeff Owen	483		
Labour	Keri Peter Thomas*	480		
Plaid Cymru	Roger Thomas Price*	432		
Labour	David Griffiths	248		
Conservative	Anthony Leslie Aubrey	71		
Plaid Cymru hold		Swing		
Labour hold		Swing		

=== Whitland (one seat) ===
Whitland 2012
Party	Candidate	Votes	%	±%
Independent	Sue Allen*	514		
Plaid Cymru	Diane Evans	230		
Labour	Steve Morris	81		
Liberal Democrats	Huw Llewelyn Jones	17		
Majority				
Independent hold		Swing		

== By-Elections 2012-2017 ==
=== Trelech by-election 2014 ===
A by-election was held in Trelech on 11 December 2014 following the retirement of long-serving Independent councillor Dai Thomas. Plaid Cymru captured the seat for the first time.

Trelech 2014 by-election
Party	Candidate	Votes	%	±%
Plaid Cymru	Jean Lewis	598	68.3	+33.6
Independent	Hugh Phillips	181	20.7	
Liberal Democrats	Selwyn Runnett	96	11.0	−3.4
Majority		417	47.7	
Turnout			52.1	−3.8
Plaid Cymru gain from Independent		Swing		

=== Hengoed by-election 2015 ===
A by-election was held in Hengoed on 19 February 2015 following the death of Labour councillor George Edwards. Labour held the seat by a small majority (but note that the percentage changes refer to the contest in the two-member ward in 2012.

Hengoed by-election 2015
Party	Candidate	Votes	%	±%
Labour	Penelope Margaret Edwards	335	33.2	+7.0
Plaid Cymru	Martin Vaughan Davies	313	31.0	+6.6
UKIP	Bramwell Gordon Richards	152	15.0	+15.0
People's Voice	Wynford John Samuel	80	7.9	−18.2
Independent	William Edward Skinner	76	7.5	+7.5
Conservative	Stephen Andrew Davies	54	5.3	+5.3
Majority		22	2.2	
Turnout			35.3	−2.6
Labour hold		Swing		

=== Kidwelly by-election 2015 ===
A by-election was held in Kidwelly on 19 November 2015 following the death of Labour councillor Keith Davies.

Kidwelly by-election 2015
Party	Candidate	Votes	%	±%
Labour	Ryan Thomas	288	33.8	−10.6
Plaid Cymru	Dilwyn Jones	248	29.1	+29.1
Independent	Fran Lloyd-Burke	177	20.8	+2.3
People First	Stephen Bowen	58	6.8	−16.5
Conservative	Stephen Andrew Davies	53	6.2	+6.2
Independent	Vivian Summers	28	3.3	+3.3
Majority		40	4.7	
Turnout			31.1	−17.7
Labour hold		Swing		

=== Cilycwm by-election 2016 ===
A by-election was held in Cilycwm on 22 September 2016 following the death of long-serving Independent councillor Tom Theophilus. Plaid Cymru captured the seat for the first time.

Cilycwm by-election 2016
Party	Candidate	Votes	%	±%
Plaid Cymru	Dafydd Owen Tomos	201	27.8	+27.8
Independent	Thomas Arwel Joseph Davies	151	20.9	
Labour	Maria Rose Carroll	123	17.0	+17.0
Independent	Matthew Graham Paul	106	14.7	
People First	Jacqueline Thompson	64	8.9	−28.4
Liberal Democrats	Catherine Nakielny	62	8.6	+8.6
Conservative	Steven Andrew Holmes	15	2.1	−17.1
Majority		50	6.9	
Turnout				
Plaid Cymru gain from Independent		Swing		
