= 2022 Carmarthenshire County Council election =

Welsh local election

- 5 May 2022

All 75 (previously 74) seats to Carmarthenshire County Council 38 seats needed for a majority
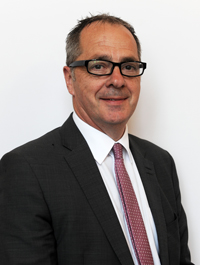

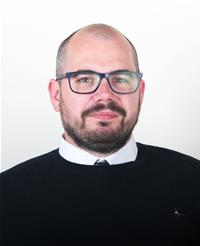
| | First party | Second party | Third party |
|---|---|---|---|
| Leader | Emlyn Dole | Rob James | Jane Tremlett |
| Party | Plaid Cymru | Labour | Independent |
| Leader's seat | Llannon (lost) | Lliedi | Laugharne |
| Last election | 36 seats | 22 seats | 16 seats |
| Seats before | 37 | 17 | 13 |
| Seats won | 38 | 23 | 8 |
| Seat change | ▲1 | ▲6 | ▼5 |
| | Fourth party | Fifth party | Sixth party |
| Leader | Jeff Edmunds | Shahana Najmi | N/A |
| Party | New Independent | Conservative | Independent (Unaffiliated) |
| Leader's seat | Bigyn | Lliedi (lost) |
| Seats before | 4 | 1 | 1 |
| Seats won | 3 | 0 | 3 |
| Seat change | ▼1 | ▼1 | ▲2 |
Council control before election
Plaid Cymru and Independent coalition
Council control after election
Plaid Cymru and Independent coalition

The 2022 Carmarthenshire County Council election took place on Thursday 5 May 2022 to elect 75 members to Carmarthenshire Council. On the same day, elections were held to the other 21 local authorities and to community councils in Wales as part of the 2022 Welsh local elections.

Plaid Cymru won a majority of seats for the first time, whilst losing their leader, Emlyn Dole. Welsh Labour regained some ground in Carmarthenshire by winning seats in the Amman Valley and Llanelli constituency from Plaid Cymru. New Independent lost one seat overall and their leader, Jeff Edmunds and the Conservatives' only councillor, Shahana Najmi, also lost her seat.

Despite winning a majority of seats, Plaid Cymru formed a coalition with eight independent councillors.

== Background ==
Council elections in Wales were originally scheduled for May 2021, but were delayed to avoid a conflict with the 2021 Senedd election. The frequency of the elections was also increased from 4 years to five years to avoid future clashes, meaning (after 2022) the next council election is expected in 2027.

The number of councillors were increased by 1 after the Local Democracy and Boundary Commission for Wales recommended the change in a report in August 2019. Although there was an increase from 74 to 75 seats in the council, the number of wards were decreased to 51 from 58.

The Plaid Cymru group in conjunction with Independent group had been in control of the council since May 2015. Labour claimed to be confident of success, though had suffered a number of resignations from the party since the last election. Many former Labour members were standing in this election as New Independents.

== Boundary changes ==
In July 2021 Welsh Government accepted a number of ward change proposals by the Local Democracy and Boundary Commission for Wales, with slight modifications on Welsh language names for some wards. These are to take effect from the 2022 council election. The changes gave a better parity of representation. Thirty-four wards remained unchanged. Of the other wards:

- Carmarthen Town North ward merges with Carmarthen Town South ward and is renamed "Carmarthen Town North and South", with total decrease in councillors from 4 to 3.
- Ammanford ward merges with Pontamman ward with a 2 councillor seat, and renamed "Ammanford".
- Tycroes community of Llanedi Ward merges with Llanedi community of Hendy Ward with 1 councillor, and renamed "Tycroes".
- Hendy community of Hendy ward becomes a ward of its self with 1 councillor.
- Bynea ward would have an increase from 1 to 2 councillors.
- Dafen ward merges with Felinfoel ward with a 2 councillor seat, and renamed "Dafen and Felinfoel".
- Bigyn ward would have an increase from 2 to 3 councillors.
- Tyisha ward merges with a part of Elli Ward (known as 'Lakefield' – Polling district TYI-B) with 2 councillors, and named "Tyisha".
- Elli ward loses area 'Lakefield' (Polling district TYI-B) and remains with 1 councillor.
- Kidwelly ward merges with St. Ishmael town of St. Ishmael ward with a 2 councillor seat, and renamed "Kidwelly and St. Ishmael".
- Llangyndeyrn ward merges with Llandyfaelog community of St. Ishmael ward with a 2 councillor seat, and renamed "Llangyndeyrn".
- Llansteffan ward merges with St. Clears ward with a 2 councillor seat, and renamed "St. Clears with Llansteffan".
- Trelech ward merges with Newchurch and Merthyr community of Cynwyl Elfed ward, remains with a 1 councillor seat, and named "Trelech".
- Cynwyl Elfed ward loses Newchurch and Merthyr community, remains with a 1 councillor seat, and named "Cynwyl Elfed".
- Cenarth ward merges with Llangeler ward with a 2 councillor seat, and renamed "Cenarth and Llangeler".
- Cilycwm ward merges with Cynwyl Gaeo and Llanycrwys communities of Cynwyl Gaeo ward, with 1 councillor seat, and named "Cilycwm".
- Manordeilo and Salem ward merges with Llansawel community of Cynwyl Gaeo ward, with 1 councillor seat, and named "Manordeilo and Salem".

== Overview of results ==
Plaid Cymru won 38 out of 75 seats to gain a majority on the council for the first time, despite the defeat of their leader, Emlyn Dole.

== Ward results ==
(* denotes sitting councillor before election).

=== Abergwili (1 Seat) ===
Abergwili 2022
| Party | Candidate | Votes | % | ±% |
|---|---|---|---|---|
| Plaid Cymru | Neil Lewis | 730 | 70.7 | +11 |
| Conservative | Havard Hughes | 303 | 29.3 | +29 |
| Majority | | 427 | 41.3 | +22 |
| Turnout | | 1,033 | 52.22 | |
| Plaid Cymru hold | | Swing | 5.5 | |

=== Ammanford (2 Seats) ===
Ammanford 2022
| Party | Candidate | Votes | % | ±% |
|---|---|---|---|---|
| Plaid Cymru | Colin Evans | 853 | 46.5 | N/A |
| Plaid Cymru | Deian Harris* | 800 | 43.6 | N/A |
| Labour | Anthony Jones | 757 | 41.2 | N/A |
| Labour | Calum Higgins | 715 | 38.9 | N/A |
| Conservative | Huw Roberts | 183 | 10.0 | N/A |
| Majority | | | | |
| Turnout | | 1,836 | 42.75 | |
| Plaid Cymru win (new seat) | | | | |
| Plaid Cymru win (new seat) | | | | |

Evans was formerly councillor for the Pontamman ward.

=== Betws (1 Seat) ===
Betws 2022
| Party | Candidate | Votes | % | ±% |
|---|---|---|---|---|
| Plaid Cymru | Betsan Wyn Jones* | 494 | 68.9 | +18 |
| Labour | Paul Allchurch | 223 | 31.1 | –8 |
| Majority | | 271 | 38 | +26 |
| Turnout | | 717 | 40.30 | |
| Plaid Cymru hold | | Swing | 14 | |

=== Bigyn (3 Seats) ===
Michael Cranham was sitting Mayor of Llanelli and Independent town councillor.

Two Labour candidates tied for the third seat with Philip Thomas Warlow beating David Darkin to the third seat on the toss of a coin.

Sitting Councillors, Jeff Edmunds and Eryl Morgan, who were elected in 2017 as Labour Councillors but subsequently left Labour and formed their own political party.

Bigyn 2022
| Party | Candidate | Votes | % | ±% |
|---|---|---|---|---|
| Independent | Michael David Cranham | 758 | 50.3 | |
| Labour | Janet Williams | 621 | 41.2 | |
| Labour | Philip Thomas Warlow | 597 | 39.6 | |
| Labour | David Darkin | 596 | 39.5 | |
| Independent | Jeff Edmunds* | 494 | 32.8 | |
| Independent | Eryl Morgan* | 411 | 27.3 | |
| Plaid Cymru | Kathryn Jane Driscoll | 338 | 22.4 | |
| Majority | | | | |
| Turnout | | 1,507 | 31.23 | |
| Independent gain from Independent | | | | |
| Labour gain from Independent | | | | |
| Labour win (new seat) | | | | |

=== Burry Port (2 Seats) ===
Burry Port 2022
| Party | Candidate | Votes | % | ±% |
|---|---|---|---|---|
| Labour | John James* | 948 | 63.8 | |
| Labour | Shelly Godfrey-Coles | 767 | 51.6 | |
| Independent | Mike Theodoulou | 471 | 31.7 | |
| Plaid Cymru | Emyr Evans | 301 | 20.3 | |
| Majority | | | | |
| Turnout | | 1,485 | 43.43 | |
| Labour hold | | | | |
| Labour hold | | | | |

=== Bynea (2 Seats) ===
Bynea 2022
| Party | Candidate | Votes | % | ±% |
|---|---|---|---|---|
| Labour | Deryk Cundy* | 596 | 50.0 | |
| Labour | Michelle Donoghue | 470 | 39.4 | |
| Independent | Simon Ford | 429 | 36.0 | |
| Independent | Shelley Williams | 404 | 33.9 | |
| Plaid Cymru | Laura Kemp | 272 | 22.8 | |
| Majority | | | | |
| Turnout | | 1,193 | 33.60 | |
| Labour hold | | | | |
| Labour win (new seat) | | | | |

=== Carmarthen Town North and South (3 Seats) ===
Carmarthen Town North and South 2022
| Party | Candidate | Votes | % | ±% |
|---|---|---|---|---|
| Plaid Cymru | Peter Hughes Griffiths* | 1,188 | 46.8 | |
| Plaid Cymru | Gareth Howell John* | 1,178 | 46.4 | |
| Plaid Cymru | Alun Lenny* | 1,073 | 42.3 | |
| Labour | Nia Maynard | 1,067 | 42.0 | |
| Labour | Mike Maynard | 1,063 | 41.9 | |
| Labour | Amanda Aldridge | 971 | 38.2 | |
| Green | Bar Rowlands | 256 | 10.1 | |
| Majority | | | | |
| Turnout | | 2,539 | 37.08 | |
| Plaid Cymru win (new seat) | | | | |
| Plaid Cymru win (new seat) | | | | |
| Plaid Cymru win (new seat) | | | | |

=== Carmarthen Town West (2 Seat) ===
Carmarthen Town West 2022
| Party | Candidate | Votes | % | ±% |
|---|---|---|---|---|
| Plaid Cymru | Emlyn Schiavone* | 968 | 68.3 | |
| Plaid Cymru | Russell Sparks | 733 | 51.7 | |
| Labour | Edi Diong | 398 | 28.1 | |
| Independent | Dai Evans | 285 | 20.1 | |
| Majority | | | | |
| Turnout | | 1,417 | 36.42 | |
| Plaid Cymru hold | | Swing | | |
| Plaid Cymru gain from Independent | | Swing | | |

=== Cenarth and Llangeler (2 Seats) ===
Cenarth and Llangeler 2022
| Party | Candidate | Votes | % | ±% |
|---|---|---|---|---|
| Plaid Cymru | Hazel Evans* | 1,449 | 74.3 | |
| Plaid Cymru | Ken Howell* | 1,277 | 65.5 | |
| Liberal Democrats | Philip Gibbons | 418 | 21.4 | |
| Majority | | | | |
| Turnout | | 1,950 | 42.51 | |
| Plaid Cymru win (new seat) | | | | |
| Plaid Cymru win (new seat) | | | | |

=== Cilycwm (1 Seat) ===
Cilycwm 2022
| Party | Candidate | Votes | % | ±% |
|---|---|---|---|---|
| Plaid Cymru | Thomas Arwel Joseph Davies* | 706 | 64.6 | |
| Conservative | Steven Holmes | 250 | 22.9 | |
| Independent | Jacqui Thompson | 137 | 12.5 | |
| Majority | | | | |
| Turnout | | 1,093 | 50.66 | |
| Plaid Cymru gain from Independent | | Swing | | |

=== Cwarter Bach (1 Seat) ===
Cwarter Bach 2022
| Party | Candidate | Votes | % | ±% |
|---|---|---|---|---|
| Plaid Cymru | John Glynog Davies* | 455 | 45.0 | –11 |
| Labour | Tom Addey | 437 | 43.2 | +4 |
| Independent | Tony Strutt | 67 | 6.6 | +7 |
| Conservative | Lee Stabbins | 53 | 5.2 | +5 |
| Majority | | 18 | 2 | –210 |
| Turnout | | 1,012 | 45.7 | |
| Plaid Cymru hold | | Swing | –7.5 | |

=== Cynwyl Elfed (1 Seat) ===
Cynwyl Elfed 2022
| Party | Candidate | Votes | % | ±% |
|---|---|---|---|---|
| Plaid Cymru | Bryan Davies | 712 | 73.8 | |
| Conservative | Malcom Berry | 253 | 26.2 | |
| Majority | | | | |
| Turnout | | 965 | 49.49 | |
| Plaid Cymru gain from Independent | | Swing | | |

=== Dafen and Felinfoel (2 Seats) ===
Dafen and Felinfoel 2022
| Party | Candidate | Votes | % | ±% |
|---|---|---|---|---|
| Labour | Rob Evans* | 881 | 61.7 | |
| Labour | Nysia Evans | 643 | 45.0 | |
| Independent | Tegwen Devichand | 320 | 22.4 | |
| Independent | Hugh Richards | 289 | 20.2 | |
| Plaid Cymru | Alan Cameron Williams | 224 | 15.7 | |
| Conservative | Norma Gregory | 120 | 8.4 | |
| Gwlad | Clem Thomas | 73 | 5.1 | |
| Liberal Democrats | Justin Mark Griffiths | 51 | 3.6 | |
| Majority | | | | |
| Turnout | | 1,429 | 36.00 | |
| Labour hold | | Swing | | |
| Labour hold | | Swing | | |

=== Elli (1 Seat) ===
Elli 2022
| Party | Candidate | Votes | % | ±% |
|---|---|---|---|---|
| Independent | John Paul Jenkins* | 333 | 48.1 | +7 |
| Labour | Nick Pearce | 185 | 26.7 | +1 |
| Plaid Cymru | Robert William Snaith | 72 | 10.4 | –3 |
| Conservative | Christopher Griffiths | 54 | 7.8 | –12 |
| Independent | Jane Jones | 49 | 7.1 | +7 |
| Majority | | | | |
| Turnout | | 693 | 42.03 | |
| Independent hold | | Swing | | |

=== Garnant (1 Seat) ===
Garnant 2022
| Party | Candidate | Votes | % | ±% |
|---|---|---|---|---|
| Labour | Kevin Madge* | 490 | 70.3 | |
| Plaid Cymru | Ffion Lewis | 207 | 29.7 | |
| Majority | | | | |
| Turnout | | 697 | 43.29 | |
| Labour hold | | Swing | | |

=== Glanamman (1 Seat) ===
Glanamman 2022
| Party | Candidate | Votes | % | ±% |
|---|---|---|---|---|
| Labour | Emyr Rees | 423 | 56.2 | |
| Plaid Cymru | David Jenkins* | 330 | 43.8 | |
| Majority | | | | |
| Turnout | | 753 | 41.25 | |
| Labour gain from Plaid Cymru | | Swing | | |

=== Glanymor (2 Seats) ===
Sean Rees had stood in Glanymor in 2017 as a Plaid Cymru candidate and missed out on being elected by a single vote. In 2022, standing as an independent candidate, he topped the poll with a 407 vote majority over the second-placed candidate.

That second seat was won by incumbent councillor, Louvain Roberts, who was elected as a Labour councillor in 2017 but left the Labour Party in 2019. At this election she stood as an independent, retaining her seat.

Glanymor 2022
| Party | Candidate | Votes | % | ±% |
|---|---|---|---|---|
| Independent | Sean Lucas Rees | 1,055 | 64.6 | |
| Independent | Louvain Roberts* | 648 | 39.7 | |
| Labour | Lillith Fenris | 363 | 22.2 | |
| Labour | Julian Hunt | 344 | 21.1 | |
| Independent | Amanda Carter | 270 | 16.5 | |
| Plaid Cymru | Jordan Phillip Griffiths | 164 | 10.0 | |
| Majority | | | | |
| Turnout | | 1,632 | 35.63 | |
| Independent gain from Labour | | Swing | | |
| Independent gain from Labour | | Swing | | |

=== Glyn (1 Seat) ===
Glyn 2022
| Party | Candidate | Votes | % | ±% |
|---|---|---|---|---|
| Plaid Cymru | Alex Evans | 511 | 63.6 | |
| Independent | Cath Saunders | 196 | 24.4 | |
| Conservative | Jordan Spencer Randall | 69 | 8.6 | |
| Liberal Democrats | Jonathan Edward Burree | 28 | 3.5 | |
| Majority | | | | |
| Turnout | | 804 | 46.85 | |
| Plaid Cymru gain from Independent | | Swing | | |

=== Gorslas (2 Seats) ===
Gorslas 2022
| Party | Candidate | Votes | % | ±% |
|---|---|---|---|---|
| Plaid Cymru | Darren Price* | 1,216 | 75.2 | |
| Plaid Cymru | Aled Vaughan Owen* | 1,157 | 71.6 | |
| Labour | Darren James | 456 | 28.2 | |
| Turnout | | 1,617 | 40.19 | |
| Plaid Cymru hold | | Swing | | |
| Plaid Cymru hold | | Swing | | |

=== Hendy (1 Seat) ===
Hendy 2022
| Party | Candidate | Votes | % | ±% |
|---|---|---|---|---|
| Plaid Cymru | Gareth Thomas* | 437 | 51.8 | |
| Labour | Ian Wooldridge | 336 | 39.8 | |
| Gwlad | Wayne Erasmus | 71 | 8.4 | |
| Majority | | | | |
| Turnout | | 844 | 33.95 | |
| Plaid Cymru hold | | Swing | | |

=== Hengoed (2 Seats) ===
Hengoed 2022
| Party | Candidate | Votes | % | ±% |
|---|---|---|---|---|
| Labour | Edward Skinner | 480 | 35.3 | |
| Labour | Martyn Palfreman | 435 | 32.0 | |
| Plaid Cymru | Susan Phillips* | 395 | 29.1 | |
| Independent | Ray Duncan Jones | 322 | 23.7 | |
| Plaid Cymru | Martin Davies | 314 | 23.1 | |
| Independent | Colin Jones | 198 | 14.6 | |
| Gwlad | Siân Mair Caiach | 150 | 11.0 | |
| Independent | Lee Fox | 146 | 10.8 | |
| Liberal Democrats | Christopher David William Passmore | 80 | 5.9 | |
| Majority | | | | |
| Turnout | | 1,358 | 39.44 | |
| Labour hold | | Swing | | |
| Labour gain from Plaid Cymru | | Swing | | |

=== Kidwelly and St. Ishmael (2 Seats) ===
Kidwelly and St Ishmael 2022
| Party | Candidate | Votes | % | ±% |
|---|---|---|---|---|
| Labour | Crish Davies | 1,033 | 55.4 | |
| Labour | Lewis Davies | 952 | 51.1 | |
| Plaid Cymru | Jeanette Gilasbey* | 775 | 41.6 | |
| Plaid Cymru | June James | 483 | 25.9 | |
| Green | Rob Davies | 201 | 10.8 | |
| Majority | | | | |
| Turnout | | 1,863 | 45.25 | |
| Labour win (new seat) | | | | |
| Labour win (new seat) | | | | |

Gilasbey had been the councillor for the former Kidwelly ward.

=== Laugharne Township (1 Seat) ===
Laugharne Township 2022
| Party | Candidate | Votes | % | ±% |
|---|---|---|---|---|
| Independent | Jane Tremlett* | Unopposed | | |
| Independent hold | | | | |

=== Llanboidy (1 Seat) ===
Llanboidy 2022
| Party | Candidate | Votes | % | ±% |
|---|---|---|---|---|
| Plaid Cymru | Dorian Phillips* | 783 | 85.4 | |
| Conservative | Valerie Jones | 134 | 14.6 | |
| Majority | | | | |
| Turnout | | 917 | 52.69 | |
| Plaid Cymru hold | | Swing | | |

=== Llanddarog (1 Seat) ===
Llanddarog 2022
| Party | Candidate | Votes | % | ±% |
|---|---|---|---|---|
| Plaid Cymru | Ann Davies* | 739 | 84.3 | |
| Liberal Democrats | Sian Elizabeth Collins | 138 | 15.7 | |
| Majority | | | | |
| Turnout | | 877 | 51.49 | |
| Plaid Cymru hold | | Swing | | |

=== Llandeilo (1 Seat) ===
Llandeilo 2022
| Party | Candidate | Votes | % | ±% |
|---|---|---|---|---|
| Independent | Edward Gwynne Thomas* | 827 | 62.7 | |
| Plaid Cymru | Christoph Florian Fischer | 493 | 37.3 | |
| Majority | | | | |
| Turnout | | 1,320 | 54.55 | |
| Independent hold | | | | |

=== Llandovery (1 Seat) ===
Llandovery 2022
| Party | Candidate | Votes | % | ±% |
|---|---|---|---|---|
| Plaid Cymru | Handel Davies* | 770 | 86.3 | |
| Conservative | Samuel Barnett | 122 | 13.7 | |
| Majority | | | | |
| Turnout | | 892 | 44.65 | |
| Plaid Cymru hold | | Swing | | |

=== Llandybie (2 Seat) ===
Llandybie 2022
| Party | Candidate | Votes | % | ±% |
|---|---|---|---|---|
| Independent | Anthony (Whitey) Davies* | 869 | 58.1 | |
| Plaid Cymru | Dai Nicholas* | 789 | 52.7 | |
| Labour | Helen Bjork | 622 | 41.6 | |
| Liberal Democrats | Lynne Susan Wilkins | 129 | 8.6 | |
| Majority | | | | |
| Turnout | | 1,496 | 44.05 | |
| Independent hold | | Swing | | |
| Plaid Cymru hold | | Swing | | |

=== Llanegwad (1 Seat) ===
Llanegwad 2022
| Party | Candidate | Votes | % | ±% |
|---|---|---|---|---|
| Plaid Cymru | Mansel Charles* | 751 | 64.5 | |
| Independent | Meirion Jones | 244 | 21.0 | |
| Conservative | Mike Beech | 169 | 14.5 | |
| Majority | | | | |
| Turnout | | 1,164 | 56.29 | |
| Plaid Cymru hold | | Swing | | |

=== Llanfihangel Aberbythych (1 Seat) ===
Llanfihangel Aberbythych 2022
| Party | Candidate | Votes | % | ±% |
|---|---|---|---|---|
| Plaid Cymru | Hefin Jones | 426 | 65.0 | |
| Conservative | Tara-Jane Louise Sutcliffe | 128 | 19.5 | |
| Liberal Democrats | Monica Mary French | 62 | 9.5 | |
| Propel | Trisha Breckman | 39 | 6.0 | |
| Majority | | | | |
| Turnout | | 655 | 43.14 | |
| Plaid Cymru hold | | Swing | | |

=== Llanfihangel-ar-Arth (1 Seat) ===
Llanfihangel-ar-Arth 2022
| Party | Candidate | Votes | % | ±% |
|---|---|---|---|---|
| Plaid Cymru | Linda Evans* | 950 | 87.2 | |
| Conservative | Sandra Morgan | 140 | 12.8 | |
| Majority | | | | |
| Turnout | | 1,090 | 49.18 | |
| Plaid Cymru hold | | Swing | | |

=== Llangadog (1 Seat) ===
Llangadog 2022
| Party | Candidate | Votes | % | ±% |
|---|---|---|---|---|
| Plaid Cymru | Andrew Davies | 446 | 51.4 | |
| Independent | Hywel Morgan | 422 | 48.6 | |
| Majority | | | | |
| Turnout | | 868 | 52.79 | |
| Plaid Cymru hold | | Swing | | |

=== Llangennech (2 Seats) ===
Llangennech 2022
| Party | Candidate | Votes | % | ±% |
|---|---|---|---|---|
| Labour | Gary Jones* | 981 | 63.3 | |
| Labour | Jacqueline Seward | 686 | 44.3 | |
| Plaid Cymru | Ian Morlais Williams | 590 | 38.1 | |
| Plaid Cymru | Iwan Griffiths | 587 | 37.9 | |
| Majority | | | | |
| Turnout | | 1,549 | 37.85 | |
| Labour hold | | Swing | | |
| Labour gain from Plaid Cymru | | Swing | | |

=== Llangunnor (1 Seat) ===
Llangunnor 2022
| Party | Candidate | Votes | % | ±% |
|---|---|---|---|---|
| Plaid Cymru | Elwyn Williams* | 478 | 46.4 | |
| Conservative | Charlie Evans | 348 | 33.8 | |
| Independent | Lee Williams | 205 | 19.9 | |
| Majority | | | | |
| Turnout | | 1,031 | 48.74 | |
| Plaid Cymru hold | | Swing | | |

=== Llangyndeyrn (2 Seats) ===
Llangydeyrn 2022
| Party | Candidate | Votes | % | ±% |
|---|---|---|---|---|
| Plaid Cymru | Tyssul Evans* | 1,064 | 56.5 | |
| Plaid Cymru | Meinir James | 944 | 50.1 | |
| Independent | Gary David Price | 690 | 36.6 | |
| Labour | Shane Morrison | 549 | 29.1 | |
| Majority | | | | |
| Turnout | | 1,884 | 44.00 | |
| Plaid Cymru hold | | Swing | | |
| Plaid Cymru hold | | Swing | | |

=== Llannon (2 Seats) ===
Llannon 2022
| Party | Candidate | Votes | % | ±% |
|---|---|---|---|---|
| Labour | Dot Jones* | 594 | 39.6 | |
| Plaid Cymru | Llinos Mai Davies | 568 | 37.8 | |
| Plaid Cymru | Emlyn Dole* | 561 | 37.4 | |
| Labour | Rhys Jones | 445 | 29.6 | |
| Independent | Kim (Cross Hands) Thomas | 409 | 27.2 | |
| Gwlad | Iwan Evans | 79 | 5.3 | |
| Liberal Democrats | Nicholas Paul Beckett | 75 | 5.0 | |
| Majority | | | | |
| Turnout | | 1,501 | 35.69 | |
| Labour hold | | Swing | | |
| Plaid Cymru hold | | Swing | | |

=== Llanybydder (1 Seat) ===
Llanybydder 2022
| Party | Candidate | Votes | % | ±% |
|---|---|---|---|---|
| Plaid Cymru | Denise Owen | 602 | 75.1 | |
| Labour | Wynne Jones | 200 | 24.9 | |
| Majority | | | | |
| Turnout | | 802 | 37.51 | |
| Plaid Cymru gain from Independent | | Swing | | |

=== Lliedi (2 Seats) ===
Rob James, leader of the Labour Group on Carmarthenshire County Council, was re-elected.

The other incumbent Councillor, Shahana Najmi, had originally been elected in 2012 as a Labour Councillor, was one of several Labour Councillors in Llanelli to leave the Labour Party in 2019. Initially sitting as an independent Councillor, Najmi joined the Conservative Party in 2021 but was not re-elected as a Conservative in Lliedi in 2022.

Lliedi 2022
| Party | Candidate | Votes | % | ±% |
|---|---|---|---|---|
| Labour | Rob James* | 838 | 61.4 | |
| Labour | Anthony Leyshon | 652 | 47.8 | |
| Independent | Sharon Burdess | 374 | 27.4 | |
| Independent | Heather Peters | 373 | 27.3 | |
| Conservative | Shahana Najmi* | 226 | 16.6 | |
| Majority | | | | |
| Turnout | | 1,365 | 34.46 | |
| Labour hold | | Swing | | |
| Labour hold | | Swing | | |

=== Llwynhendy (2 Seats) ===
Llwynhendy 2022
| Party | Candidate | Votes | % | ±% |
|---|---|---|---|---|
| Independent | Sharen Davies* | 581 | 54.3 | |
| Independent | Jason Peter Hart | 560 | 52.3 | |
| Labour | Fozia Akhtar* | 477 | 44.6 | |
| Labour | Gary Jones | 341 | 31.9 | |
| Liberal Democrats | Tim Freeman | 57 | 5.3 | |
| Majority | | | | |
| Turnout | | 1,070 | 33.75 | |
| Independent gain from Labour | | Swing | | |
| Independent gain from Labour | | Swing | | |

=== Manordeilo and Salem (1 Seat) ===
Manordeilo and Salem 2022
| Party | Candidate | Votes | % | ±% |
|---|---|---|---|---|
| Independent | Fiona Walters | 640 | 59.0 | |
| Plaid Cymru | Elizabeth Nakielny | 444 | 41.0 | |
| Majority | | | | |
| Turnout | | 1,084 | 49.12 | |
| Independent hold | | | | |

=== Pembrey (2 Seats) ===
Pembrey 2022
| Party | Candidate | Votes | % | ±% |
|---|---|---|---|---|
| Independent | Hugh Shepardson* | 854 | 62.0 | |
| Labour | Michael Thomas | 630 | 45.8 | |
| Plaid Cymru | Peter Freeman | 453 | 32.9 | |
| Majority | | | | |
| Turnout | | 1,377 | 39.87 | |
| Independent hold | | Swing | | |
| Labour hold | | Swing | | |

=== Penygroes (1 Seat) ===
Penygroes 2022
| Party | Candidate | Votes | % | ±% |
|---|---|---|---|---|
| Plaid Cymru | David Thomas* | 453 | 45.9 | |
| Labour | Rachel Williams | 260 | 26.3 | |
| Liberal Democrats | Julian William Tandy | 188 | 19.0 | |
| Breakthrough Party | Ewan Phillip Chappell | 87 | 8.8 | |
| Majority | | | | |
| Turnout | | 988 | 41.14 | |
| Plaid Cymru hold | | | | |

=== Pontyberem (1 Seat) ===
Pontyberem 2022
| Party | Candidate | Votes | % | ±% |
|---|---|---|---|---|
| Plaid Cymru | Liam Bowen* | 739 | 71.3 | |
| Labour | Michael Jones | 297 | 28.7 | |
| Majority | | | | |
| Turnout | | 1,036 | 46.48 | |
| Plaid Cymru hold | | Swing | | |

=== Saron (2 Seats) ===
Saron 2022
| Party | Candidate | Votes | % | ±% |
|---|---|---|---|---|
| Plaid Cymru | Karen Davies* | 668 | 51.2 | |
| Labour | Peter Cooper | 660 | 50.6 | |
| Plaid Cymru | Darran Jones | 516 | 39.6 | |
| Independent | Nigel Evans | 225 | 17.3 | |
| Liberal Democrats | Caryl Evelyn Tandy | 130 | 10.0 | |
| Majority | | | | |
| Turnout | | 1,304 | 38.00 | |
| Plaid Cymru hold | | Swing | | |
| Labour gain from Plaid Cymru | | Swing | | |

=== St. Clears and Llansteffan (2 Seats) ===
St Clears and Llansteffan 2022
| Party | Candidate | Votes | % | ±% |
|---|---|---|---|---|
| Plaid Cymru | Carys Jones* | 1,151 | 53.9 | |
| Independent | Philip Hughes* | 1,110 | 52.0 | |
| Independent | Edmund Davies | 677 | 31.7 | |
| Independent | Ran Foster-Mason | 565 | 26.5 | |
| Majority | | | | |
| Turnout | | 2,135 | 50.59 | |
| Plaid Cymru hold | | Swing | | |
| Independent hold | | Swing | | |

=== Swiss Valley (1 Seat) ===
Swiss Valley 2022
| Party | Candidate | Votes | % | ±% |
|---|---|---|---|---|
| Independent | Anthony Giles Morgan* | 687 | 75.5 | +24 |
| Conservative | Sarah Griffiths | 131 | 14.4 | +4 |
| Independent | Darren Harries | 92 | 10.1 | +10 |
| Majority | | 556 | 62 | +38 |
| Turnout | | 910 | 43.27 | |
| Independent hold | | | | |

=== Trelech (1 Seat) ===
Trelech 2022
| Party | Candidate | Votes | % | ±% |
|---|---|---|---|---|
| Plaid Cymru | Jean Lewis* | 1,055 | 84.6 | |
| Conservative | Lee Wiseman | 192 | 15.4 | |
| Majority | | | | |
| Turnout | | 1,247 | 53.23 | |
| Plaid Cymru hold | | Swing | | |

=== Trimsaran (1 Seat) ===
Trimsaran 2022
| Party | Candidate | Votes | % | ±% |
|---|---|---|---|---|
| Plaid Cymru | Kim Broom* | 483 | 64.7 | |
| Labour | Barry Kirby | 264 | 35.3 | |
| Majority | | | | |
| Turnout | | 747 | 38.58 | |
| Plaid Cymru hold | | Swing | | |

=== Tycroes (1 Seat) ===
Tycroes 2022
| Party | Candidate | Votes | % | ±% |
|---|---|---|---|---|
| Labour | Tina Higgins* | 772 | 71.0 | |
| Plaid Cymru | Geraint Rhys Jones | 315 | 29.0 | |
| Majority | | | | |
| Turnout | | 1,087 | 49.71 | |
| Labour hold | | | | |

=== Tyisha (2 Seat) ===
Tyisha 2022
| Party | Candidate | Votes | % | ±% |
|---|---|---|---|---|
| Labour | Suzy Curry* | 606 | 53.5 | |
| Plaid Cymru | Terry Davies | 548 | 48.4 | |
| Labour | Andre McPherson* | 426 | 37.6 | |
| Independent | Andrew Stephens | 338 | 29.8 | |
| Majority | | | | |
| Turnout | | 1,133 | 31.57 | |
| Labour hold | | Swing | | |
| Plaid Cymru gain from Labour | | Swing | | |

=== Whitland (1 Seat) ===
Whitland 2022
| Party | Candidate | Votes | % | ±% |
|---|---|---|---|---|
| Independent | Sue Allen* | 544 | 68.0 | |
| Independent | Barry Alan Chapman | 256 | 32.0 | |
| Majority | | | | |
| Turnout | | 800 | 42.34 | |
| Independent hold | | | | |

== Affiliation changes 2022–2027 ==
Lliedi councillor Robert James was suspended from the Labour Party in 2024 and, in late 2025, joined the Green Party.

== By-elections 2022–2027 ==
=== Elli by-election ===
A by-election was held in Elli on 6 March 2024 following the resignation of Independent councillor John Jenkins. The seat was won by Independent candidate Stephen Williams.

Elli by-election 2024
| Party | Candidate | Votes | % | ±% |
|---|---|---|---|---|
| Independent | Stephen Williams | 211 | 35.9 | N/A |
| Conservative | Richard Williams | 151 | 23.5 | +15.7 |
| Labour | Nicholas Pearce | 145 | 22.6 | −4.1 |
| Plaid Cymru | Stephen Beckett | 48 | 7.5 | −2.9 |
| UKIP | Hettie Sheehan | 27 | 4.2 | New |
| Independent | Sharon Burdess | 23 | 3.6 | N/A |
| Liberal Democrats | Justin Griffiths | 16 | 2.5 | New |
| Gwlad | Wayne Erasmus | 2 | 0.3 | New |
| Majority | | 60 | 12.4 | |
| Turnout | | 623 | 36.43 | |
| Independent hold | | Swing | | |

=== Llanddarog by-election ===
Llanddarog by-election March 6th 2025
| Party | Candidate | Votes | % | ±% |
|---|---|---|---|---|
| Plaid Cymru | Shone Hughes | 397 | 57.1 | −27.1 |
| Reform | Bernard Holton | 145 | 20.9 | N/A |
| Conservative | Richard Williams | 139 | 20.0 | N/A |
| Gwlad | Wayne Erasmus | 14 | 2.0 | N/A |
| Turnout | | 695 | 42 | |
| Plaid Cymru hold | | Swing | | |

=== Lliedi by-election ===
Lliedi by-election May 29th 2025
| Party | Candidate | Votes | % | ±% |
|---|---|---|---|---|
| Reform | Michelle Beer | 568 | 42.6 | N/A |
| Labour | Andrew Bragoli | 312 | 23.4 | −34.9 |
| Independent | Sharon Burdess | 116 | 8.7 | N/A |
| Plaid Cymru | Taylor Reynolds | 107 | 8.0 | N/A |
| Conservative | Richard Williams | 93 | 7.0 | −8.7 |
| Independent | Alison Leyshon | 86 | 6.5 | N/A |
| Liberal Democrats | Jonathan Burree | 41 | 3.1 | N/A |
| Gwlad | Wayne Erasmus | 9 | 0.7 | N/A |
| Turnout | | 1,332 | 38.2 | |
| Majority | | 256 | 19.2 | |
| Reform gain from Labour | | | | |

=== Llangennech by-election ===
Llangennech by-election August 7th 2025
| Party | Candidate | Votes | % | ±% |
|---|---|---|---|---|
| Reform | Carmelo Colasanto | 694 | 43.1 | N/A |
| Plaid Cymru | Richard Talog Jones | 489 | 30.4 | −7.17 |
| Labour | Jordan Sargent | 380 | 23.6 | −38.8 |
| Liberal Democrats | Justin Griffiths | 26 | 1.6 | N/A |
| Conservative | Edward Evans | 14 | 0.9 | N/A |
| Gwlad | Wayne Erasmus | 6 | 0.4 | N/A |
| Turnout | | 1,609 | 39.4 | |
| Majority | | 205 | | |
| Reform gain from Labour | | | | |

=== Llangennech by-election ===
Llangennech by-election June 25th 2026
| Party | Candidate | Votes | % | ±% |
|---|---|---|---|---|
| Plaid Cymru | Iwan Griffiths | 483 | | |
| Labour | Jordan Andre Sargent | 338 | | |
| Reform | Gavin Paul Rashbrook | 283 | | |
| Conservative | Craig Griffiths | 38 | | |
| Independent | Sean Maliphant Hogan | 11 | | N/A |
| Green | Michael Hugh Willis | 8 | | N/A |
| Liberal Democrats | Justin Mark Griffiths | 7 | | |
| Turnout | | | | |
| Majority | | 145 | | |
| Plaid Cymru gain from Reform | | | | |

=== Saron by-election ===
Saron by-election: 22 October 2026
| Party | Candidate | Votes | % | ±% |
|---|---|---|---|---|
| Plaid Cymru | Nicholas Davies | 397 | 43.9 | +4.2 |
| Reform | Richard Galvin | 253 | 28.0 | N/A |
| Labour | Anthony Jones | 159 | 17.6 | −21.6 |
| Conservative | Craig Griffiths | 44 | 4.9 | N/A |
| Independent | Owen Jenkins | 41 | 4.5 | N/A |
| Liberal Democrats | Caryl Tandy | 11 | 1.2 | −6.5 |
| Majority | | 144 | 15.9 | N/A |
| Turnout | | 905 | 26.6 | −11.4 |
| Plaid Cymru gain from Labour | | Swing | | |
