= Llanelli Town Council =

Community council in Carmarthenshire, Wales

Llanelli Town Council Cyngor Tref Llanelli

Type
- Type: Town council

Leadership
- Leader: Sean Rees, Independent
- Deputy Leader: Mike Cranham, Independent
- Mayor: Louvain Roberts (2026/27), Independent
- Deputy Mayor: Terry Davies (2026/27), Plaid Cymru
- Seats: 22

Motto
- "Cyfoeth Cymdeithas: Cymuned" ("A society's wealth is its community")

Meeting place
- The Old Vicarage, Town Hall Square

Website
- www.llanellitowncouncil.gov.uk

Llanelli Town Council (Welsh: Cyngor Tref Llanelli) is the community council that governs the majority of wards in Llanelli town. The Council is run by a group or groups who command the support of the majority of the elected representatives. The current leader is Sean Rees. The council also appoints an annual ceremonial Mayor who presides over meetings of the Council who is known as the Mayor of Llanelli.

Llanelli Town Council governs the area of Llanelli covered by five council wards which elect twenty-two Town Councillors. The five wards with the number of councillors in parentheses are; Bigyn (6), Elli (2), Glanymor (5), Lliedi (5) and Tyisha (4).

The motto, seen in the coat of arms says "Cyfoeth Cymdeithas: Cymuned", which translates as "A society's wealth is its community".

== Current composition ==
Group affiliation	Members
Labour	9
Plaid Cymru	1
Independent	10
Green Party	2
Total	22

The current mayor is Cllr. Louvain Roberts

== Election history ==
2025 By-election Bigyn Ward Alan C. Williams (Ind) (following vacation of seat by Cllr Jordan Elliott)

2024 By-Election Elli Ward Cllr Stephen Williams (IND) (following resignation of Cllr John Jenkins)

2023 By-Election Tyisha Ward Cllr John Prosser (LAB) (following resignation of Cllr Debbie Nicholas)

=== 2022 Election ===
Ward	Party	Town councillors elected - May 2022
Bigyn	Independent	Michael Cranham
Bigyn	Labour	David Darkin
Bigyn	Labour	Jordan Elliott
Bigyn	Labour	Gareth Lloyd
Bigyn	Labour	Phil Warlow
Bigyn	Labour	Janet Williams
Elli	Labour	Nick Pearce
Elli	Independent	John Jenkins
Glanymor	Independent	Amanda Carter
Glanymor	Independent	John Jones
Glanymor	Labour	Lillith Fenris
Glanymor	Independent	Sean Rees
Glanymor	Independent	Louvain Roberts
Lliedi	Labour	Andrew Bragoli
Lliedi	Labour	Sarah Evans
Lliedi	Labour	Shaun Greaney
Lliedi	Labour	Rob James
Lliedi	Labour	Anthony Lochrie
Tyisha	Labour	Suzy Curry
Tyisha	Plaid Cymru	Terry Davies
Tyisha	Labour	Andre McPherson
Tyisha	Labour	Debbie Nicholas

=== 2017 Election ===
Ward	Party	Town councillors elected - May 2017
Bigyn	Independent	Michael Cranham
Bigyn	Labour	Jeff Edmunds
Bigyn	Labour	Lauren Edmunds
Bigyn	Labour	Matthew Edmunds
Bigyn	Labour	Chris Reed
Bigyn	Labour	Edward Skinner
Elli	Labour	David Darkin
Elli	Conservative	Sion Davies
Elli	Independent	John Jenkins
Glanymor	Independent	John Jones
Glanymor	Plaid Cymru	Winston Lemon
Glanymor	Labour	John Prosser
Glanymor	Plaid Cymru	Sean Rees
Glanymor	Labour	Louvain Roberts
Lliedi	Labour	Christopher Griffiths
Lliedi	Labour	Sara Griffiths
Lliedi	Labour	Shahana Najmi
Lliedi	Labour	Philip Warlow
Lliedi	Labour	Jan Williams
Tyisha	Labour	Suzy Curry
Tyisha	Plaid Cymru	Terry Davies
Tyisha	Labour	Andre McPherson

Four Labour town councillors defected on 6 March 2019 following claims of bullying. They subsequently sat as independents. In September 2019 former Labour councillor Chris Griffiths joined the Conservatives, doubling their numbers on the council.

=== 2012 Election ===
Ward	Party	Town councillors elected 2012	2015 by-election
Bigyn	Plaid Cymru	Michael Burns	
Bigyn	Plaid Cymru	Ffion Larsen	
Bigyn	Plaid Cymru	Dyfrig Thomas	
Bigyn	Labour	Christopher Reed MBE	
Bigyn	Labour	Jeff Edmunds	
Elli	Liberal Democrats	Pam Edmunds	
Elli	Plaid Cymru	Ruth Price	
Elli	Independent	John Jenkins	
Glanymor	Labour	Hubert Hitchman	
Glanymor	Labour	Linda Steadman	
Glanymor	Plaid Cymru	R M Davies	
Glanymor	Plaid Cymru	Winston Lemon	
Lliedi	Labour	Bill Thomas	
Lliedi	Labour	Jan Williams	
Lliedi	Labour	Clive Thomas	
Lliedi	Labour	Shahana Najmi	
Lliedi	Labour	Jill Johns	David Darkin
Tyisha	Labour	Carl Lucas	
Tyisha	Plaid Cymru	Roger Price	
Tyisha	Independent	Jeff Owen	

=== 2008 Election ===
Ward	Party	Town councillors elected 2008
Bigyn	Plaid Cymru	Michael Burns
Bigyn	Plaid Cymru	Ffion Larsen
Bigyn	Plaid Cymru	Roger Price
Bigyn	Plaid Cymru	David Skivington
Bigyn	Plaid Cymru	Dyfrig Thomas
Elli	Independent	John Jenkins
Elli	Liberal Democrats	Pam Edmunds
Elli	Liberal Democrats	Michael Gimlett
Glanymor	Labour	Hubert Hitchman
Glanymor	Independent	John Jones
Glanymor	Plaid Cymru	Winston Lemon
Glanymor	Labour	Linda Steadman
Lliedi	Liberal Democrats	Joanna Isaac
Lliedi	Liberal Democrats	Ken Rees
Lliedi	Labour	Edward Skinner
Lliedi	Labour	Jan Williams
Lliedi	Labour	Bill Thomas
Tyisha	Labour	Carl Lucas
Tyisha	Labour	Ray Neil
Tyisha	Labour	John Roberts

=== 2004 Election ===
Ward	Party	Town councillors elected 2004
Bigyn	Labour	N. Bevan
Bigyn	Independent	B. Davies
Bigyn	Labour	Eryl Morgan
Bigyn	Labour	M. E. Prothero
Bigyn	Labour	Eric Smith
Elli	Independent	John Jenkins
Elli	Liberal Democrats	Pam Edmunds
Elli	Liberal Democrats	S. I. Chrinowsky
Glanymor	Labour	Hubert Hitchman
Glanymor	Labour	R. Brown
Glanymor	Labour	D. J. Harries
Glanymor	Labour	C. E. Richard
Lliedi	Labour	M. K. Francis
Lliedi	Liberal Democrats	Ken Rees
Lliedi	Labour	Edward Skinner
Lliedi	Labour	G. K. Thomas
Lliedi	Labour	Bill Thomas
Tyisha	Labour	Carl Lucas
Tyisha	Labour	Ray Neil
Tyisha	Labour	John Roberts

=== 1999 Election ===
Ward	Party	Town councillors elected 1999
Bigyn	Labour	N. Bevan
Bigyn	Labour	C. N. Charles
Bigyn	Labour	Eryl Morgan
Bigyn	Labour	M. E. Prothero
Bigyn	Labour	Eric Smith
Elli	Labour	Jan Williams
Elli	Liberal Democrats	Pam Edmunds
Elli	Liberal Democrats	S. I. Chrinowsky
Glanymor	Labour	H. D. Phillips
Glanymor	Labour	R. Brown
Glanymor	Labour	D. J. Harries
Glanymor	Labour	C. E. Richard
Lliedi	Liberal Democrats	J. A. Hughes
Lliedi	Liberal Democrats	Ken Rees
Lliedi	Labour	Edward Skinner
Lliedi	Labour	Gren Darby
Lliedi	Labour	Bill Thomas
Tyisha	Labour	Carl Lucas
Tyisha	Labour	J. E. Neil
Tyisha	Plaid Cymru	Dyfrig Thomas

== List of Town Mayors ==
Past Mayors of Llanelli

1974/75 T. V. Davies (Inaugural Town Mayor)

1975/76 V. D. Thomas

1976/77 Joie Davies

1977/78 W. Raymond H. Thomas

1978/79 D. John Harries

1979/80 Leslie R. Hickman

1980/81 Ken Davies

1981/82 Eileen Clarke

1982/83 Michael Gimblett

1983/84 Cliff Charles

1984/85 Margaret Prothero

1985/86 W. Raymond H. Thomas

1986/87 D. John Harries

1987/88 Leslie R. Hickman

1988/89 Ken Davies

1989/90 Cliff Charles

1990/91 Margaret Prothero

1991/92 Elinor G. Lloyd

1992/93 Jan Neil

1993/94 Steffan Chrinowsky

1994/95 Carl Lucas

1995/96 Margaret Evans

1996/97 Eric Smith

1997/98 Jan Williams

1998/99 Pam Edmunds

1999/00 Gren Darby

2000/01 Connie Richards

2001/02 Kenneth Rees

2002/03 Edward Skinner

May-Dec 2003 Hywel Phillips

Jan-June 2004 Edward Skinner

2004/05 Eryl Morgan

2005/06 Nigel Bevan

2006/07 Michael Francis

2007/08 Ray Neil

2008/09 Hubert Hitchman

2009/10 John Jenkins

2010/11 Dyfrig Thomas

2011/12 Linda Stedman

2012/13 Winston Lemon

2013/14 Michael Burns

2014/15 Roger Price

2015/16 Shahana Najmi, J.P.

2016/17 William “Bill” Thomas

2017/18 Jeff Edmunds

2018/19 David Darkin

2019/20 John E. Jones

2020-21 Chris Griffiths - the town council's first ever Conservative mayor

2021-22 Michael Cranham J.P.

2022-23 Philip Warlow

2023-24 Nick Pearce

2024-25 John G. Prosser

2025-26 A.R. Bragoli - May - November J.E. Jones J.P. - December - May

== See also ==
- Llanelli Rural
