= Cenarth (electoral ward) =

Electoral ward in Carmarthenshire, Wales

Cenarth (Welsh pronunciation) is an electoral ward, representing the communities of Newcastle Emlyn and Cenarth, Carmarthenshire, Wales. It is strangely named Cenarth, rather than Newcastle Emlyn as Newcastle Emlyn has the larger population. A similar ward for local elections prior to 1987 was named Newcastle Emlyn.

== Profile ==
In 2014, the Cenarth electoral ward had an electorate of xx. The total population was xx, of whom very few were born in Wales. Few of the population were able to speak Welsh.

== Current Representation ==
The Cenarth Ward is a single-member ward for the purposes of Carmarthenshire County Council elections. Since 2012 it has been represented by Plaid Cymru councillor Hazel Evans.

== Recent history ==
The first election to the new unitary Carmarthenshire County Council took place in 1995. An Independent candidate was returned unopposed.

Cenarth
| Party | Candidate | Votes | % | ±% |
|---|---|---|---|---|
| Independent | Alan Wyndham Jones | unopposed | | |
| Independent hold | | Swing | | |

In 1999 the seat was captured by Plaid Cymru.

Cenarth 1999
| Party | Candidate | Votes | % | ±% |
|---|---|---|---|---|
| Plaid Cymru | John David George Crossley | 434 | | |
| Independent | Trevor Glyn Bryant | 342 | | |
| Independent | Alan Wyndham Jones* | 292 | | |
| Majority | | 92 | | |
| Plaid Cymru gain from Independent | | Swing | | |

In 2004 the sitting Plaid Cymru councillor contested the neighbouring Llangeler Ward and Cenarth was won by an Independent. The sitting Plaid Cymru councillor, John Crossley, chose to contest Llangeler and the party did not field a candidate, leading to the loss of the seat to the Independents.

Cenarth
| Party | Candidate | Votes | % | ±% |
|---|---|---|---|---|
| Independent | William Haydn Jones | 368 | | |
| Independent | Thomas Hesford | 350 | | |
| Independent | Peter Lewis | 155 | | |
| Labour | Michael Barron | 155 | | |
| Majority | | 18 | | |
| Independent gain from Plaid Cymru | | Swing | | |

In 2008, the seat was held by the sitting member.

Cenarth 2008
| Party | Candidate | Votes | % | ±% |
|---|---|---|---|---|
| Independent | William Haydn Jones* | 653 | | |
| Plaid Cymru | Susan Jones | 190 | | |
| Majority | | 463 | | |
| Independent hold | | Swing | | |

By the 2012 Haydn Jones had died and the seat was won at a by-election by Plaid Cymru. Plaid held the seat at the following election by a large majority. Hazel Evans had captured the seat in a by-election following the death of the previous Independent member, Haydn Jones.

Cenarth 2012
| Party | Candidate | Votes | % | ±% |
|---|---|---|---|---|
| Plaid Cymru | Hazel Anna Louise Evans* | 670 | | |
| Conservative | Henrietta Elizabeth Hensher | 97 | | |
| Majority | | 573 | | |
| Plaid Cymru hold | | Swing | | |

== History ==
=== County Council Elections ===
An area roughly equating to the current ward elected a member to Carmarthenshire County Council from 1889 until its abolition in 1974. The ward was known as Newcastle Emlyn.

With the formation of Dyfed County Council, Cenarth and Newcastle Emlyn were part of the Carmarthen Rural No.6 Ward. This ward was renamed Llangeler in 1989. This ward was largely included the current Llangeler Ward.

When the unitary Carmarthenshire County Council was formed in 1995 a ward based on similar boundaries to those in existence between 1889 and 1974 was re-established.

=== District Council Elections ===
From 1973 until 1996, Cenarth formed an electoral ward for the purposes of elections to Carmarthen District Council. This ward was known as Newcastle Emlyn until 1987.
