= Llandeilo (electoral ward) =

Electoral ward in Carmarthenshire, Wales

Coordinates: 51.863°N 3.967°W

Llandeilo is an electoral ward for Carmarthenshire County Council, which includes the communities of Llandeilo and Dyffryn Cennen, in Carmarthenshire, Wales. It is represented by one county councillor.

== Description ==
The Llandeilo ward covers the town of Llandeilo the neighbouring rural community of Dyffryn Cennen, which includes the village of Ffairfach. The usual population of this ward at the 2011 census was 2,971.

== Representation ==
Llandeilo was the name of a ward to Dinefwr Borough Council from 1973 until 1996, though its representation (and boundaries) changed on several occasions.

A smaller county ward of Llandeilo Castle was initially created for the new Carmarthenshire County Council at the 1995 election. The Llandeilo electoral ward in its current two-community form was created in 1998 to elect one county councillor at every election from 1999.

Independent councillor Ieuan Jones represented the ward from 1999. He did not stand at the 2012 elections and the ward was won by another Independent, Edward Thomas, who was re-elected in 2017 and 2022. Thomas eschews party politics and claims to have never been a member of the Liberal Democrats, Plaid Cymru, Labour Party or Conservatives.

== Elections ==
* retiring councillor in the ward standing for re-election

=== 2022 ===
Christoph Fischer, Llandeilo town councillor and founder of the Llandeilo Book Festival, stood for Plaid Cymru in 2022, though failed to unseat the sitting councillor.

Carmarthenshire County Council election, 5 May 2022
Party	Candidate	Votes	%	±%
Independent	Edward Thomas*	827	62.65	
Plaid Cymru	Christoph Fischer	493	37.35	
Majority		334		

=== 2017 ===
Thomas held his seat with a large majority at the 2017 election.

Carmarthenshire County Council election, 4 May 2017
Party	Candidate	Votes	%	±%
Independent	Edward Thomas*	798	57.33	
Liberal Democrats	Lesley Prosser	268	19.25	
Plaid Cymru	Keri Lewis	249	17.89	
Conservative	David Hayes	77	5.53	
Majority		530		
