= Lliedi (electoral ward) =

Electoral ward in Carmarthenshire, Wales

Coordinates: 51.690°N 4.153°W

Lliedi is an electoral ward for Llanelli Town Council and Carmarthenshire County Council in Llanelli, Wales.

The ward is in the far north of Llanelli, bounded to the west by Old Road and to the south by James Street. The River Lliedi runs through the middle of the ward. The population of this ward at the 2011 census was 5,457.

== Representation ==
Lliedi was an electoral ward to Dyfed County Council, electing a Labour Party councillor at the 1989 election and a Liberal Democrat councillor at the 1993 elections.

Since 1995 Lliedi has been an electoral ward to Carmarthenshire County Council, electing two county councillors.

Lliedi is also one of the community wards to Llanelli Town Council, electing five town councillors.

Shahana Najmi was elected as one of the Labour county councillors at the 2017 elections, but left the Labour Party in 2019 to sit as an independent councillor. In October 2021 she joined the Conservative Party, therefore represented Lliedi as a Tory.

Rob James, one of the Labour county councillors elected in 2017, became leader of the county council's Labour Group. In January 2024, James was suspended from the Labour Party and, in late 2025, joined the Green Party subsequently sitting as a Green councillor.

== Elections ==
=== 2025 by-election ===
Following the death of previous councillor Anthony Leyshon, Michelle May Beer won the seat in a by-election on 29 May 2025 with a majority of 256 votes. She was the first ever elected representative of Reform UK on Carmarthenshire County Council and the second elected representative in Wales.

By-election 29 May 2025
Party	Candidate	Votes	%	±%
Reform	Michelle Beer	568	42.6	N/A
Labour	Andrew Bragoli	312	23.4	−34.9
Independent	Sharon Burdess	116	8.7	N/A
Plaid Cymru	Taylor Reynolds	107	8.0	N/A
Conservative	Richard Williams	93	7.0	−8.7
Independent	Alison Leyshon	86	6.5	N/A
Liberal Democrats	Jonathan Burree	41	3.1	N/A
Gwlad	Wayne Erasmus	9	0.7	N/A
Turnout		1,335	33.4	
Majority		256	19.2	
Reform gain from Labour (UK)				

=== 2022 ===
Shahana Najmi, who had first been elected in the ward for Labour in 2012 (and again in 2017) had left the Labour Party in 2019 then joined the Conservative Party in 2021. She had also been leader of Llanelli Town Council.

Carmarthenshire County Council, 5 May 2022
Party	Candidate	Votes	%	±%
Labour	Rob James*	838	61.4	
Labour	Anthony Leyshon	652	47.8	
Independent	Sharon Burdess	374	27.4	
Independent	Heather Peters	373	27.3	
Conservative	Shahana Najmi*	226	16.6	
Majority				
Turnout		1,365	34.46	
Labour hold		Swing		
Labour hold		Swing		

* denotes sitting councillor in the ward before the election
