= Cilycwm (electoral ward) =

Electoral ward in Carmarthenshire, Wales

Cilycwm is an electoral ward, representing the communities of Cilycwm, Llansadwrn and Llanwrda, Carmarthenshire, Wales.

== Profile ==
In 2014, the Cilycwm electoral ward had an electorate of 1,211. The total population was 1,486, of whom 57.4% were born in Wales. The 2011 census indicated that 46.0% of the population were able to speak Welsh.

== Current Representation ==
The Cilycwm Ward is a single-member ward for the purposes of Carmarthenshire County Council elections. Since 1995 it has been represented by Independent councillor Tom Theophilus.

== Recent history ==
The first election to the new unitary Carmarthenshire County Council took place in 1995. At this stage the ward also included the communities of Cynwyl Gaeo and Talley. Tom Theophilus, a long-serving district and county councillor was elected.

Cynwyl Gaeo and Llanwrda/Talley 1995
Party	Candidate	Votes	%	±%
Independent	Thomas Theophilus*	782		
Independent	W.G. Rees	137		
Liberal Democrats	J.P. Doubell	105		
Green	Tim Shaw	105		
Majority		645		
Independent win (new seat)				

In 1999 the seat - now on its current boundaries was held by Tom Theophilus.

Cilycwm 1999
Party	Candidate	Votes	%	±%
Independent	Thomas Theophilus*	unopposed		
Independent win (new seat)				

In 2004 the sitting member was again returned.

Cilycwm
Party	Candidate	Votes	%	±%
Independent	Thomas Theophilus*	unopposed		
Independent hold		Swing		

In 2008, the seat was again held by the sitting member.

Cilycwm 2008
Party	Candidate	Votes	%	±%
Independent	Thomas Theophilus*	474		
Independent	Marianne Goddard-Peperzak	178		
Independent	Roger Melvin Pipe	76		
Independent hold		Swing		

By the 2012 Tom Theophilus, who had represented the area for decades narrowly held the seat against one of the most prominent opponents of the previous administration and a leading critic of Mark James, the Chief Executive of the Council.

Cilycwm 2012
Party	Candidate	Votes	%	±%
Independent	Thomas Theophilus*	307		
Independent	Jacqui Thomapson	264		
Conservative	Matthew Graham Paul	136		
Independent hold		Swing		

== History ==
=== County Council Elections ===
An area roughly equating to the current ward elected a member to Carmarthenshire County Council from 1889 until its abolition in 1974. The ward was known as Newcastle Emlyn.

With the formation of Dyfed County Council, Cilycwm was part of the Llandeilo Rural No.1 Ward (which included the former borough of Llandovery. This ward was renamed Llandovery in 1989.

When the unitary Carmarthenshire County Council was formed in 1995 a new Cilycwm ward was formed and its boundaries changed in 1999. It was now similar to the ward that existed between 1889 and 1974.

=== District Council Elections ===
From 1973 until 1996, Cilycwm formed an electoral ward for the purposes of elections to Dinefwr Borough Council.
