= Bigyn (electoral ward) =

Electoral ward in Carmarthenshire, Wales

Bigyn is an electoral ward, representing part of the community of Llanelli, Carmarthenshire, Wales. It is a three-member ward for the purposes of elections to Carmarthenshire County Council, with the number of councillors being increased from two to three for the elections held in May 2022.

== Profile ==
In 2014, the Bigyn electoral ward had an electorate of 4,931. The total population was 6,750, of whom 83% were born in Wales. 23.0% of the population were able to speak Welsh.

== Current Representation ==
The Bigyn Ward is a three-member ward for the purposes of Carmarthenshire County Council elections. Since 2022 it has been represented by Independent Michael Cranham and Labour Party councillors Janet Williams and Philip Warlow.

== Carmarthen County Council elections ==
The first election to the new unitary Carmarthenshire County Council took place in 1995. Bigyn Ward had three seats, all of which were won by the Labour Party. Martin Morris, the sitting member for the ward on Dyfed County Council, was elected alongside Sandra Cooke and David Prothero, a former county councillor. Three sitting members of Llanelli Borough Council were unsuccessful.

Bigyn 1995
Party	Candidate	Votes	%	±%
Labour	Martin Philip Morris+	1,090		
Labour	Sandra Melita Cooke	924		
Labour	David Charles Prothero	902		
Independent	William J Marks*	693		
Liberal Democrats	Margaret N Burree*	676		
Independent	Richard Ivor John*	531		
Labour gain from Independent		Swing		
Labour gain from Liberal Democrats		Swing		
Labour gain from Independent		Swing		

At the 1999, the boundaries remained unchanged but the number of seats were reduced from three to two. Martin Morros contested the Tyisha Ward, where he was successful, allowing his two colleagues to be returned for Bigyn.

Bigyn 1999
Party	Candidate	Votes	%	±%
Labour	Sandra Melita Cooke*	1,172		
Labour	David Charles Prothero*	1,077		
Liberal Democrats	Margaret Eileen Evans	856		
Liberal Democrats	Peter Buckley Jones	724		
Labour hold		Swing		
Labour hold		Swing		

Labour again held both seats in 2004.

Bigyn
Party	Candidate	Votes	%	±%
Labour	Sandra Melita Cooke*	728		
Labour	David Charles Prothero*	631		
Plaid Cymru	Michael Burns	495		
Independent	Brian Davies	410		
Independent	Lawrence Jenkins	351		
Labour hold		Swing		
Labour hold		Swing		

In 2008, Labour fared badly in the Llanelli area as a whole and lost both seats in Bigyn to Plaid Cymru.

Bigyn 2008
Party	Candidate	Votes	%	±%
Plaid Cymru	Michael Burns	740		
Plaid Cymru	Dyfrig Thomas	729		
Labour	Sandra Melita Cooke*	603		
Labour	David Charles Prothero*	476		
Independent	Brian Davies	230		
Independent	Peter William Dunkley	210		
Independent	Lawrence Jenkins	202		
Independent	Dai Rees	84		
Plaid Cymru gain from Labour		Swing		
Plaid Cymru gain from Labour		Swing		

In 2012, Labour, having held all seats in Bigyn from 1995 until 2008, regained both on a low turnout. Eryl Morgan was previously county councillor for Hengoed.

Bigyn 2012
Party	Candidate	Votes	%	±%
Labour	Eryl Morgan	609		
Labour	Jeff Edmunds	565		
Plaid Cymru	Michael Burns*	523		
Plaid Cymru	Dyfrig Thomas*	518		
Independent	Nigel Bevan	401		
People First	Stephen Bowen	287		
Turnout			33.3	
Labour gain from Plaid Cymru		Swing		
Labour gain from Plaid Cymru		Swing		

Bigyn 2017
Party	Candidate	Votes	%	±%
Labour	Jeff Edmunds	610	20	
Labour	Eryl Morgan	575	19	
Independent	Terry Morris	428	14	
Independent	Nigel Bevan	414	13	
Plaid Cymru	Michael Burns	333	11	
Plaid Cymru	Kathryn Lodge	304	10	
Conservative	Robert Thomas	236	8	
Independent	Stephen Bowen	181	6	
Turnout		3081	35.48	
Labour hold		Swing		
Labour hold		Swing		

In May 2022, Independent Michael Cranham and Labour's Janet Williams came first and second. The third place vote was tied, on 596 votes, between the other two Labour candidates Philip Warlow and David Darkin. The winner was decided by the toss of a coin, with Warlow guessing correctly.

== Earlier History ==
=== County Council Elections ===
The long-standing ward boundaries in Llanelli were redrawn in the 1980s to create five new wards, namely Bigyn, Elli, Glanymor, Lliedi and Tyisha. Each of these wards returned a member to Dyfed County Council in 1989 and 1993.

When the current Carmarthenshire County Council was formed in 1995, the Bigyn Wards remained unchanged and initially returned three members to the new authority. This was reduced to two members in 1999.

=== District Council Elections ===
From 1987, Bigyn formed an electoral ward for the purposes of elections to Llanelli Borough Council. Bigyn returned three members.
