= Bynea (electoral ward) =

Electoral ward in Carmarthenshire, Wales

Bynea is an electoral ward, representing part of the community of Llanelli Rural, Carmarthenshire, Wales.

== Profile ==
In 2014, the Bynea electoral ward had an electorate of 4,931. According to the 2001 UK Census 87% were born in Wales. 35% of the population claimed to be able to speak Welsh.

== Current Representation ==
Dafan is a ward to Llanelli Rural Council, electing three community councillors.

The Bynea Ward is a single-member ward for the purposes of Carmarthenshire County Council elections. Since 2012 it has been represented by Labour Party councillor D.M. Cundy.

== Elections ==
The first election to the new unitary Carmarthenshire County Council took place in 1995. Bynea was by the Labour Party defeating a Green Party candidate who was a sitting member of Llanelli Borough Council.

Bynea
Party	Candidate	Votes	%	±%
Labour	Thomas Dillwyn Bowen*	533		
Independent Green	Marcus Hughes*	320		
Majority		213		
Labour gain from Independent Green		Swing		

At the 1999, Labour held the seat unopposed.

Bynea 1999
Party	Candidate	Votes	%	±%
Labour	Thomas Dillwyn Bowen*	unopposed		
Labour hold		Swing		

In 2004 the sitting Labour member chose to contest the Llwynhendy ward and Bynea was won by an independent.

Bynea
Party	Candidate	Votes	%	±%
Independent	Gwynne Harris Woolridge	544		
Labour	Muriel Jones	329		
Majority		215		
Independent gain from Labour		Swing		

In 2008, Labour fared badly in the Llanelli area as a whole and Woolridge comfortably held Bynea.

Bynea 2008
Party	Candidate	Votes	%	±%
Independent	Gwynne Harris Woolridge*	505		
Independent	Stephen Michael Donoghue	244		
Labour	Mair Bartlett	196		
Majority		261		
Independent hold		Swing		

In 2012, on a very low turnout, Labour came from third place to take a seat held by the Independent candidate, a member of the cabinet, since 2004.

Bynea 2012
Party	Candidate	Votes	%	±%
Labour	Deryk Michael Cundy	445		
Independent	Gwynne Harris Woolridge*	328		
People First	Michelle Williams	179		
Majority		117		
Turnout			23.6	
Labour gain from Independent		Swing		

== Earlier History ==
=== County Council Elections ===
The long-standing ward boundaries in the Llanelli Rural area were redrawn in the 1980s to create three new wards, namely Felinfoel, Hengoed and Llwynhendy. Each of these wards returned a member to Dyfed County Council in 1989 and 1993. For county elections, Bynea was part of the Llwynhendy ward.

When the current Carmarthenshire County Council was formed in 1995, the Bynea Wards elected one member to the new authority.

=== District Council Elections ===
At the same time as the boundary changes for county elections, noted above, six wards were created in the Llanelli Rural area for district and community elections. Therefore, from 1987, Bynea formed an electoral ward for the purposes of elections to Llanelli Borough Council. Bynea returned one member, for the Labour Party in 1987 and for the Green Party in 1991.
