= Burry Port (electoral ward) =

Electoral ward in Carmarthenshire, Wales

Burry Port is an electoral ward, representing the community of Burry Port, Carmarthenshire, Wales.

== Profile ==
In 2014, the Burry Port electoral ward had an electorate of 3,387. The total population was 4,240, of whom 80.3% were born in Wales. 32.2% of the population were able to speak Welsh.

== Current Representation ==
The Burry Port Ward is a two-member ward for the purposes of Carmarthenshire County Council elections. It is currently represented by Labour Party councillors Jack James (first elected in 2012) and Amanda Fox (first elected in 2017).

== Recent history ==
The first election to the new unitary Carmarthenshire County Council took place in 1995. Burry Port had two seats, both of which were won by the Liberal Democrats. Keith Evans, the sitting member for the ward on Dyfed County Council, was elected alongside George West, a sitting member on Llanelli Borough Council.

Burry Port
Party	Candidate	Votes	%	±%
Liberal Democrats	Keith J. Evans+*	1,014		
Liberal Democrats	George W. West*	693		
Plaid Cymru	David Hywel Nolan	501		
Labour	Lawrence Jenkins	397		
Labour	Paul Malcolm Davies	356		
Liberal Democrats win (new seat)				
Liberal Democrats win (new seat)				

At the 1999, Labour gained both seats, having won one in a by-election.

Burry Port 1999
Party	Candidate	Votes	%	±%
Labour	Patricia Ethel Mary Jones*	1,217		
Labour	Peter Jewell	1,060		
Liberal Democrats	Pamela Georgina Every	589		
Labour hold		Swing		
Labour gain from Liberal Democrats		Swing		

Labour lost one of the seats to an Independent in 2004.

Burry Port
Party	Candidate	Votes	%	±%
Labour	Patricia Ethel Mary Jones*	850		
Independent	Stephen Randall James	754		
Labour	Hugh Shepardson	710		
Plaid Cymru	Joanna Davies	301		
Plaid Cymru	Alexander Anderson	226		
Labour hold		Swing		
Independent gain from Labour		Swing		

In 2008, the situation remained unchanged.

Burry Port 2008
Party	Candidate	Votes	%	±%
Independent	Stephen Randall James*	931		
Labour	Patricia Ethel Mary Jones*	854		
Plaid Cymru	John Jack James	623		
Labour	Andrew Phillips	298		
Independent hold		Swing		
Labour hold		Swing		

In 2012, Labour, regained the second seat. Pat Jones, a member of the authority since 1999, was re-elected alongside another Labour candidate who narrowly ousted the sitting Independent member, who had served since 2004. The Conservative candidate had stood as a Liberal Democrat in 1999.

Burry Port 2012
Party	Candidate	Votes	%	±%
Labour	Patricia Ethel Mary Jones*	741		
Labour	Jack James	634		
Independent	Stephen Randall James*	622		
Plaid Cymru	Gaynor Davies	388		
Conservative	Pam Every	239		
Turnout			44.5	
Labour hold		Swing		
Labour gain from Independent		Swing		

== Earlier History ==
=== County Council Elections ===
Burry Port first became an electoral ward in the early twentieth century, having initially been part of the Pembrey ward at the formation of Carmarthenshire County Council. In due course two wards were created at Ammanford for county council electionsand these continued to exist until Carmarthenshire was abolished in 1974.

With the formation of Dyfed County Council, Ammanford continued to elect two councillors until the wards were merged in 1989.

When the current Carmarthenshire County Council was formed in 1995, a Burry Port ward based on the community of that name was created.

=== District Council Elections ===
From 1987, Burry Port formed an electoral ward for the purposes of elections to Llanelli Borough Council. Burry Port returned three members.
