= Cynwyl Gaeo (electoral ward) =

Electoral ward in Carmarthenshire, Wales

Cynwyl Gaeo is an electoral ward, representing the communities of Cynwyl Gaeo, Llansawel and Llanycrwys, Carmarthenshire, Wales.

== Profile ==
In 2014, the Cynwyl Gaeo electoral ward had an electorate of 1,323. The total population was 1,630, of whom 54.5% were born in Wales. The 2011 census indicated that 46.7% of the population were able to speak Welsh.

== Current Representation ==
Cynwyl Gaeo is a single-member ward for the purposes of Carmarthenshire County Council elections. Since 1999 it has been represented by Plaid Cymru councillor Eirwyn Williams.
