= Tyisha =

Electoral ward in Carmarthenshire, Wales

Coordinates: 51.678°N 4.162°W

Tyisha is an electoral ward for Llanelli Town Council and Carmarthenshire County Council in Llanelli, Wales.

== Description ==
The ward is bounded to the south by the Swansea to Carmarthen railway, to the east by Ann Street and stretches west to the Selwyn Samuel Centre. The population of this ward at the 2011 census was 4,079.

The ward is the most deprived in Carmarthenshire and the 17th most deprived in Wales. The decline has been most marked during the 21st century, with the closure of nearby heavy industry and loss of jobs. In 2021 Carmarthenshire County Council earmarked £9.3 million to improve housing and revitalise empty shops in the area.

Tyisha has been an electoral ward to Carmarthenshire County Council since its recreation in 1995, electing two county councillors.

Tyisha is also one of the community wards to Llanelli Town Council, electing four town councillors.

== County elections ==
At the 2022 Carmarthenshire County Council elections in May 2022, Labour's Suzy Curry came top of the poll and retained her seat. Plaid Cymru's Terry Davies came second, taking the other seat off the Labour Party (having lost to Labour at the May 2017 election).
