= Elli (electoral ward) =

Electoral ward in Carmarthenshire, Wales

Coordinates: 51.686°N 4.168°W

Elli is an electoral ward for Llanelli Town Council and Carmarthenshire County Council in Llanelli, Wales.

The ward covers a residential area in the north of Llanelli, bounded to the south by Parc y Dref, to the east by Old Road and to the west by Llanelli Rural. The population of this ward at the 2011 census was 3,203.

== Representation ==
Elli was an electoral ward to Dyfed County Council, represented by a Labour Party councillor from the 1989 election followed by a Liberal Democrat councillor from 1993.

Since 1995 Elli has been an electoral ward to Carmarthenshire County Council, represented by one county councillor.

Elli is also one of the community wards to Llanelli Town Council, electing two town councillors.

Future Lord Chancellor and Secretary of State for Wales, Robert Buckland, began his political career when he won the Elli county seat by only 3 votes in 1993. It was said he was the first Conservative to be elected in Llanelli in living memory.

Conservative councillor John Jenkins won the Elli ward at the 2004 Carmarthenshire County Council election. In February 2006 he was selected as the Conservative candidate for Carmarthen West and South Pembrokeshire in the 2007 Welsh Assembly election, but stood down after 24 hours because of homophobic remarks made in 2003. He was re-elected as Elli councillor in 2008 as an independent. He was elected again in 2012, but later that year was reported to the Ombudsman for inappropriate comments on Twitter.

== Elections ==
=== 2024 by-election ===
Independent councillor Steve Williams was voted into the Llanelli Town Council and Carmarthenshire County Council post in the Elli Ward on 6 March 2024. The by-election was held following the resignation of the previous councillor, John Jenkins. Williams is an ex Police Officer and was involved in the public protest against a Home Office decision to take over the local Stradey Park Hotel as an asylum centre.

Steve Williams (Independent) – 211 votes (36.43%)

Richard Williams (Welsh Conservative Party) – 151 votes (26.28%)

Nick Pearce (Welsh Labour) – 145 votes (25.18%)

Steve Beckett (Plaid Cymru) – 48 votes (8.37%)

Hettie Sheehan (UKIP) – 27 votes (4.70%)

Sharon Burdess (Independent) – 23 votes (3.98%)

Justin Griffiths (Welsh Liberal Democrats) – 16 votes (2.77%)

Wayne Erasmus (Gwlad – The Welsh Independence Party) – 2 votes (0.35%)
