= Glanymor =

Electoral ward in Carmarthenshire, Wales

Coordinates: 51.686°N 4.254°W

Glanymor is an electoral ward for Llanelli Town Council and Carmarthenshire County Council in south Llanelli. The population of this ward at the 2011 census was 5,668.

It consists of the following areas of Llanelli:

- Morfa
- Trostre
- Machynys
- Seaside
- New Dock

== Elections ==
The ward elects two county councillors. In May 2017 Sean Rees was defeated by only one vote standing as the Plaid Cymru candidate. After local disputes Sean elected to become independent and in May 2022 Rees came top of the poll, 407 votes ahead of the second placed winner, fellow independent Louvain Roberts.
