= 2008 Carmarthenshire County Council election =

Welsh local election

Results of the 2008 Carmarthenshire County Council election

The fourth election to Carmarthenshire County Council was held on 1 May 2008. It was preceded by the 2004 election and followed by the 2012 election. While the Independent councillors again had the largest number of seats, Plaid Cymru gained considerable ground, notably in the Llanelli and Ammanford areas. The Independents formed a coalition with Labour.

Full results of the election were published in the local press.

== Overview ==
Carmarthenshire County Council election result 2008
Party	Seats	Gains	Losses	Net gain/loss	Seats %	Votes %	Votes	+/−
Independent	32	4	4	0	43.2	37.9	24,232	
Plaid Cymru	30	14	1	+13	40.5	36.0	23,015	
Labour	11	2	16	-14	14.8	22.5	14,364	
Conservative	0	0	1	-1	0.0	1.7	1,093	
Liberal Democrats	1	1	0	+1	1.3	1.3	842	
BNP	0	0	0	0	0.0	0.4	285	
Ratepayers	0	0	0	0	0.0	0.1	79	

== Results by ward ==
=== Abergwili (one seat) ===
Abergwili 2008
Party	Candidate	Votes	%	±%
Independent	Pamela Ann Palmer*	742	76.4	+15.0
Plaid Cymru	Carl Harris	229	23.6	+1.3
Majority		513	52.8	+13.7
Independent hold		Swing		

=== Ammanford (one seat) ===
Ammanford 2008
Party	Candidate	Votes	%	±%
Labour	Michael Hugh Evans*	457		
Plaid Cymru	Deian Harries	451		
Majority		6		
Labour hold		Swing		

=== Betws (one seat) ===
Betws 2008
Party	Candidate	Votes	%	±%
Independent	Eira Audrey Jones	274		
Plaid Cymru	Annette Price	224		
Labour	John Dorian Evans*	217		
Majority		50		
Independent gain from Labour		Swing		

=== Bigyn two seats) ===
Bigyn 2008
Party	Candidate	Votes	%	±%
Plaid Cymru	Michael Burns	740		
Plaid Cymru	Dyfrig Thomas	729		
Labour	Sandra Melita Cooke*	603		
Labour	David Charles Prothero*	476		
Independent	Brian Davies	230		
Independent	Peter William Dunkley	210		
Independent	Lawrence Jenkins	202		
Independent	Dai Rees	84		
Plaid Cymru gain from Labour		Swing		
Plaid Cymru gain from Labour		Swing		

=== Burry Port (two seats) ===
Burry Port 2008
Party	Candidate	Votes	%	±%
Independent	Stephen Randall James*	931		
Labour	Patricia Ethel Mary Jones*	854		
Plaid Cymru	John Jack James	623		
Labour	Andrew Phillips	298		
Independent hold		Swing		
Labour hold		Swing		

=== Bynea (one seat) ===
Bynea 2008
Party	Candidate	Votes	%	±%
Independent	Gwynne Harris Woolridge*	505		
Independent	Stephen Michael Donoghue	244		
Labour	Mair Bartlett	196		
Majority		261		
Independent hold		Swing		

=== Carmarthen Town North (two seats) ===
Carmarthen Town North 2008
Party	Candidate	Votes	%	±%
Plaid Cymru	Peter Hughes Griffiths*	1,058		
Plaid Cymru	Gareth Owen Jones	740		
Labour	Douglas Edmund Ynyr Richards Rose	462		
Independent	David Neil Lewis	461		
Plaid Cymru hold		Swing		
Plaid Cymru hold		Swing		

=== Carmarthen Town South (two seats) ===
Carmarthen Town South 2008
Party	Candidate	Votes	%	±%
Plaid Cymru	Dafydd Arwel Lloyd	626		
Independent	Stephen Paul Dunn	369		
Independent	June Williams*	361		
Labour	Philip William Grice*	356		
Independent	Dudley Evans	231		
Plaid Cymru gain from Labour		Swing		
Independent hold		Swing		

=== Carmarthen Town West (two seats) ===
Carmarthen Town West 2008
Party	Candidate	Votes	%	±%
Plaid Cymru	Alan Douglas Thomas Speake*	967		
Independent	Arthur Davies*	748		
Plaid Cymru	Tom Talog Defis	530		
Labour	Marc Scaife	315		
Plaid Cymru hold		Swing		
Independent hold		Swing		

=== Cenarth (one seat) ===
Cenarth 2008
Party	Candidate	Votes	%	±%
Independent	William Haydn Jones*	653		
Plaid Cymru	Susan Jones	190		
Majority		463		
Independent hold		Swing		

=== Cilycwm (one seat) ===
Cilycwm 2008
Party	Candidate	Votes	%	±%
Independent	Thomas Theophilus*	474		
Independent	Marianne Goddard-Peperzak	178		
Independent	Roger Melvin Pipe	76		
Independent hold		Swing		

=== Cynwyl Elfed (one seat) ===
Cynwyl Elfed 2008
Party	Candidate	Votes	%	±%
Independent	William Dorrien Thomas*	795		
Plaid Cymru	Andrew John Dixon	650		
Independent hold		Swing		

=== Cynwyl Gaeo (one seat) ===
Cynwyl Gaeo 2008
Party	Candidate	Votes	%	±%
Plaid Cymru	James Eirwyn Williams*	unopposed		
Plaid Cymru hold		Swing		

=== Dafen (one seat) ===
Dafen 2008
Party	Candidate	Votes	%	±%
Labour	Tegwen Devichand*	532		
Plaid Cymru	Mohammad Alam Choudry	402		
Majority		130		
Labour hold		Swing		

=== Elli (one seat) ===
John Paul Jenkins was elected as a Conservative in 2004 but subsequently became an Independent

Elli 2008
Party	Candidate	Votes	%	±%
Independent	John Paul Jenkins*	575	55.3	
Labour	Janice Williams	234	22.5	
Liberal Democrats	Pamela Jean Edmunds	231	22.2	
Majority		341		
Independent hold		Swing		

=== Felinfoel (one seat) ===
Felinfoel 2008
Party	Candidate	Votes	%	±%
Independent	David William Hugh Richards*	296		
Labour	Henry John Evans	179		
Plaid Cymru	Margarita Lewis	88		
Majority		117		
Independent hold		Swing		

=== Garnant (one seat) ===
Garnant 2008
Party	Candidate	Votes	%	±%
Labour	Kevin Madge*	507		
Plaid Cymru	Emyr Williams	274		
Labour hold		Swing		

=== Glanaman (one seat) ===
Glanaman 2008
Party	Candidate	Votes	%	±%
Plaid Cymru	David Jenkins	440		
Labour	David Colin Evans*	379		
Plaid Cymru gain from Labour		Swing		

=== Glanymor (two seats) ===
Glanymor 2008
Party	Candidate	Votes	%	±%
Plaid Cymru	Winston James Lemon	532		
Independent	John Evan Jones	475		
Labour	David Allan Tucker*	431		
Plaid Cymru	Keith Skivington	420		
Labour	Gerald Frederick Meyler*	398		
Plaid Cymru gain from Labour		Swing		
Independent gain from Labour		Swing		

=== Glyn (one seat) ===
Glyn 2008
Party	Candidate	Votes	%	±%
Independent	Thomas James Jones*	500		
Independent	Terence Vaughan Owens	274		
Labour	Ron Lewis	138		
Majority		226		
Independent hold		Swing		

=== Gorslas (two seats) ===
Gorslas 2008
Party	Candidate	Votes	%	±%
Labour	Terry Davies*	915		
Independent	Henry Clive Scourfield*	871		
Plaid Cymru	Emyr Wyn Thomas	686		
Labour hold		Swing		
Independent hold		Swing		

=== Hendy (one seat) ===
Hendy 2008
Party	Candidate	Votes	%	±%
Labour	Steve Lloyd-Janes	637		
Plaid Cymru	Maria Isabel Slader	408		
Majority		229		
Labour gain from Plaid Cymru		Swing		

=== Hengoed (two seats) ===
Hengoed 2008
Party	Candidate	Votes	%	±%
Plaid Cymru	Sian Caiach	628		
Plaid Cymru	Mari Lyn Davies	516		
Labour	Eryl Morgan*	359		
Labour	Keith Price Davies*	334		
Independent	Alan Mathew Davies	270		
Independent	David Hughes	217		
Plaid Cymru gain from Labour		Swing		
Plaid Cymru gain from Labour		Swing		

=== Kidwelly (one seat) ===
Kidwelly 2008
Party	Candidate	Votes	%	±%
Labour	Keith Davies	429		
Independent	Gwilym Glanmor Jones*	330		
Plaid Cymru	Huw Gilasbey	217		
Independent	Michael Higgins	163		
Ratepayer	Tessa Finch	79		
Independent	Jack Holmes	26		
Independent	Dena Lloyd Waterford	21		
Majority		99		
Labour gain from Independent		Swing		

=== Laugharne Township (one seat) ===
Laugharne Township 2008
Party	Candidate	Votes	%	±%
Independent	Jane Tremlett	600		
Conservative	Neil Davies	394		
Labour	Steve Morris	147		
Majority		206		
Independent hold		Swing		

=== Llanboidy (one seat) ===
Llanboidy 2008
Party	Candidate	Votes	%	±%
Plaid Cymru	Daniel James Roy Llewellyn	unopposed		
Plaid Cymru hold		Swing		

=== Llanddarog (one seat) ===
Llanddarog 2008
Party	Candidate	Votes	%	±%
Independent	William John Wyn Evans*	unopposed		
Independent hold		Swing		

=== Llandeilo (one seat) ===
Llandeilo 2008
Party	Candidate	Votes	%	±%
Independent	Ieuan Goronwy Jones*	787		
Conservative	Juliana Maria-Jane Hughes	306		
Independent hold		Swing		

=== Llandovery Town (one seat) ===
Llandovery Town 2008
Party	Candidate	Votes	%	±%
Independent	Ivor John Jackson*	unopposed		
Independent hold		Swing		

=== Llandybie (two seats) ===
Anthony Davies was elected at a by-election following the death of the previous Independent councillor, Mary Thomas.

Llandybie 2008
Party	Candidate	Votes	%	±%
Independent	Anthony Davies*	949		
Labour	Anthony Wyn Jones*	474		
Plaid Cymru	Anthony John Roberts	357		
Independent	Winston Kenneth Griffiths	340		
Plaid Cymru	Owen Hathaway	303		
Independent	Meirion Bowen	151		
Independent hold		Swing		
Labour hold		Swing		

=== Llanegwad and Llanfynydd (one seat) ===
Llanegwad and Llanfynydd 2008
Party	Candidate	Votes	%	±%
Independent	Dillwyn Anthony Williams*	649		
Independent	John Mansel Charles	347		
Plaid Cymru	Henry Ellis Jones-Davies	239		
Majority				
Independent hold		Swing		

=== Llanfihangel Aberbythych (one seat) ===
Llanfihangel Aberbythych 2008
Party	Candidate	Votes	%	±%
Plaid Cymru	Dafydd Rhys Davies*	611		
Conservative	Tony Jukes	132		
Majority				
Plaid Cymru hold		Swing		

=== Llanfihangel-ar-Arth (one seat) ===
Llanfihangel-ar-Arth 2008
Party	Candidate	Votes	%	±%
Plaid Cymru	Linda Evans	817		
Independent	Emyr Davies	371		
Conservative	Douglas Mearns Spragg	169		
Majority				
Plaid Cymru hold		Swing		

=== Llangadog (one seat) ===
Llangadog 2008
Party	Candidate	Votes	%	±%
Independent	Huw Morgan	489		
Independent	John Price	360		
Plaid Cymru	Wyn Jones	206		
Majority				
Independent hold		Swing		

=== Llangeler (one seat) ===
Llangeler 2008
Party	Candidate	Votes	%	±%
Plaid Cymru	John David George Crossley*	901		
Independent	Caroline Roberts	438		
Majority				
Plaid Cymru hold		Swing		

=== Llangennech (two seats) ===
Llangenench 2008
Party	Candidate	Votes	%	±%
Plaid Cymru	Gwyneth Thomas*	976		
Plaid Cymru	William Gwyn Hopkins*	874		
Labour	Jeff Edmunds	363		
Independent	John Willock	306		
Plaid Cymru hold		Swing		
Plaid Cymru hold		Swing		

=== Llangunnor (one seat) ===
Llangunnor 2008
Party	Candidate	Votes	%	±%
Independent	Clifford Merlin Jones*	517		
Plaid Cymru	Dewi Elwyn Williams	466		
Majority		51		
Independent hold		Swing		

=== Llangyndeyrn (one seat) ===
Llangyndeyrn 2008
Party	Candidate	Votes	%	±%
Plaid Cymru	William Tyssul Evans*	820		
Labour	Len John	290		
Independent	Carol Rees	181		
Majority				
Plaid Cymru hold		Swing		

=== Llannon (two seats) ===
Llannon 2008
Party	Candidate	Votes	%	±%
Plaid Cymru	Emlyn Dole	821		
Plaid Cymru	Philip Meredith Williams	801		
Labour	Terrence Maxwell Evans	551		
Independent	Cameron Howard Morgan	521		
Labour	Ryan Thomas	413		
Plaid Cymru hold		Swing		
Plaid Cymru gain from Independent		Swing		

=== Llansteffan (one seat) ===
Llansteffan 2008
Party	Candidate	Votes	%	±%
Independent	Daff Davies*	570		
Plaid Cymru	Carys Jones	412		
Independent	Gerald Howells	113		
Conservative	Linda Parker	92		
Majority		158		
Independent hold		Swing		

=== Llanybydder (one seat) ===
Llanybydder 2008
Party	Candidate	Votes	%	±%
Plaid Cymru	Fiona Hughes	591		
Independent	Ieuan Wyn Davies*	569		
Majority		22		
Plaid Cymru gain from Independent		Swing		

=== Lliedi (two seats) ===
Lliedi 2008
Party	Candidate	Votes	%	±%
Plaid Cymru	Huw Lewis	718		
Liberal Democrats	Kenneth Denver Rees	611		
Labour	William George Thomas*	551		
Labour	William Edward Skinner*	540		
Plaid Cymru gain from Labour		Swing		
Liberal Democrats gain from Labour		Swing		

=== Llwynhendy (two seats) ===
Two Independent former Labour councillors defended their seats but one of those seats was lost to Plaid Cymru whose candidate, Meilyr Hughes had served as a councillor previously.

Llwynhendy 2008
Party	Candidate	Votes	%	±%
Independent	Donald John Davies*	353		
Plaid Cymru	Meilyr Bowen Hughes	305		
Independent	Thomas Dillwyn Bowen*	302		
Labour	Diana Darby	287		
Plaid Cymru	Christopher John Slader	275		
Labour	Pamela Jones	231		
Independent	Eunydd Ashley Brynmor Thomas	156		
Independent hold		Swing		
Plaid Cymru gain from Independent		Swing		

=== Manordeilo and Salem (one seat) ===
Manordeilo and Salem
Party	Candidate	Votes	%	±%
Independent	John James Jones Davies*	641		
Plaid Cymru	Karen Maguire	234		
Majority		407		
Independent hold		Swing		

=== Pembrey (two seats) ===
Pembrey 2008
Party	Candidate	Votes	%	±%
Plaid Cymru	David Malcolm Davies	600		
Independent	Hugh Barrie Shepardson	581		
Plaid Cymru	Joanna Mary Davies	485		
Labour	Vincent John Rees*	437		
Labour	Haydn Cripps Beynon	386		
Plaid Cymru gain from Labour		Swing		
Independent gain from Labour		Swing		

=== Penygroes (one seat) ===
Penygroes
Party	Candidate	Votes	%	±%
Plaid Cymru	Siân Elisabeth Thomas*	608		
BNP	Kevin Edwards	193		
Majority		415		

=== Pontamman (one seat) ===
Pontamman
Party	Candidate	Votes	%	±%
Plaid Cymru	Marie Binney	445		
Labour	Vivian Lynne Llewellyn*	431		
Majority		14		
Plaid Cymru gain from Labour		Swing		

=== Pontyberem (one seat) ===
Pontyberem
Party	Candidate	Votes	%	±%
Plaid Cymru	Joy Williams*	unopposed		
Plaid Cymru hold		Swing		

=== Quarter Bach (one seat) ===
Quarter Bach
Party	Candidate	Votes	%	±%
Plaid Cymru	Helen Elizabeth Wyn	592		
Labour	Elwyn Williams*	446		
Majority				
Plaid Cymru gain from Labour		Swing		

=== St Clears (one seat) ===
St Clears
Party	Candidate	Votes	%	±%
Independent	Philip Morris Hughes*	557		
Independent	Keith Alan Major	411		
Independent	William Edmund Vincent John Davies	380		
Majority		146		
Independent hold		Swing		

=== St Ishmaels (one seat) ===
St Ishmaels
Party	Candidate	Votes	%	±%
Independent	Lydia Mair Stephens*	759		
Plaid Cymru	David Huw John	418		
Independent hold		Swing		

=== Saron (two seats) ===
Saron
Party	Candidate	Votes	%	±%
Plaid Cymru	John Garfield Edwards*	889		
Labour	Alan Peter Cooper*	856		
Plaid Cymru	Ronald George Richards	680		
Plaid Cymru hold		Swing		
Labour hold		Swing		

=== Swiss Valley (one seat) ===
Swiss Valley
Party	Candidate	Votes	%	±%
Independent	Anthony Giles Morgan*	518		
Plaid Cymru	Rhydwyn Ifan	209		
Labour	Nigel Rush	186		
Majority		309		
Independent hold		Swing		

=== Trelech (one seat) ===
Trelech
Party	Candidate	Votes	%	±%
Independent	William David Thomas*	655		
Plaid Cymru	Byrnan Davies	305		
Independent hold		Swing		

=== Trimsaran (one seat) ===
Trimsaran
Party	Candidate	Votes	%	±%
Independent	Meryl Gravell*	508		
Plaid Cymru	Dilwyn John Jones	227		
Majority				
Independent hold		Swing		

=== Tycroes (one seat) ===
Tycroes 2008
Party	Candidate	Votes	%	±%
Labour	David Thomas Enoch*	422		
Plaid Cymru	Sion-Aled Wyn Higgins	309		
BNP	Mike Green	92		
Majority		113		
Labour hold		Swing		

=== Tyisha (two seats) ===
Tyisha 2008
Party	Candidate	Votes	%	±%
Labour	Keri Peter Thomas*	504		
Plaid Cymru	Roger Thomas Price	455		
Plaid Cymru	Michael Llewellyn Evans	453		
Labour	Martin Philip Morris*	431		
Labour hold		Swing		
Plaid Cymru gain from Labour		Swing		

=== Whitland (one seat) ===
Whitland 2008
Party	Candidate	Votes	%	±%
Independent	Sue Allen	593		
Labour	Vivienne Morris	219		
Majority				
Independent hold		Swing		

== By-Elections 2008-2012 ==
=== Llanegwad by-election 2011 ===
A by-election was held in Llanegwad on 23 June 2011 following the retirement of long-serving Independent councillor Dillwyn Williams.

Llanegwad 2011 by-election
Party	Candidate	Votes	%	±%
Plaid Cymru	John Mansel Charles	494		
Independent	Clive Pugh	455		
Plaid Cymru gain from Independent		Swing		
