= John Jenkins (Welsh politician) =

British politician (born 1981)

Cllr. John Paul Jenkins

Carmarthenshire County Council Elli Ward
- Incumbent
- Assumed office 10 June 2004

Llanelli Town Council Elli Ward

Personal details
- Party: Independent

John Paul Jenkins (born 1981) is a local politician in Wales, in the United Kingdom. He was a county councillor for the Elli ward of Llanelli, Carmarthenshire, and a town councillor for the same ward on Llanelli Town Council. He stood for election as a candidate of the Conservative Party for both authorities.

== Background ==
Jenkins was educated at Graig Comprehensive School, Llanelli, before studying social policy at the University of Wales, Swansea.

== Political career ==
Jenkins was elected at the local elections on 10 June 2004. As of 2006, he was the youngest elected representative in Carmarthenshire.

Before becoming a councillor, Jenkins was chosen by the Conservative Party in 2002 to be its candidate for the Llanelli constituency at the 2003 election to the National Assembly for Wales. However, in March 2003, just two months before polling day, Jenkins was reported to have made homophobic remarks on an internet forum. The story was first reported in the Western Mail and subsequently on the BBC Wales news.

Jenkins withdrew his candidacy although he claimed that his remarks had been taken out of context and that, "a lot of selective editing was carried out somewhere between my actual comments being made and the reporting of my remarks in the Western Mail and subsequently the BBC."

Later in 2003, Jenkins started his campaign for election to Carmarthenshire County Council. Running with the slogan "Standing up for Llanelli" Jenkins won election to Carmarthenshire County Council and Llanelli Town Council in 2004.

As of 2006, he serves on Carmarthenshire County Council's Planning Committee and Social Justice Scrutiny Committee, the latter being the committee that scrutinises the council's equal opportunity policies. He is also a Carmarthenshire Local Education Authority appointed governor of Bryngwyn Comprehensive School in Dafen, Llanelli. He also serves on Llanelli Town Council's Selwyn Samuel Management Committee and is a Minor Authority appointed governor of Old Road County Primary School in Llanelli.

=== Second resignation ===
On 15 February 2006, Jenkins was selected by the Conservative Party to contest the Carmarthen West and South Pembrokeshire constituency, in the 2007 Welsh Assembly election. However, the following day, Jenkins resigned as a Conservative candidate for the second time, on orders of Conservative leader David Cameron, because of his 2003 homophobic comments.

Jenkins subsequently announced that following his resignation as a candidate he was also quitting the Conservative Party because of what he saw as the Conservative Party's unfair treatment towards him.

At the 2008 county council election Jenkins was re-elected by the Elli ward, but standing as an independent.

In August 2012 Jenkins got into trouble again for his comments on social media when he suggested on Twitter to an unemployed woman that she get work as an escort, then describing a well-known footballer as a "pervert". A complaint was made to the Public Services Ombudsman for Wales.
