= Glanamman (electoral ward) =

Electoral ward in Carmarthenshire, Wales

Coordinates: 51.798°N 3.926°W

Glanamman is the name of an electoral ward for Carmarthenshire County Council, in the Amman Valley, Carmarthenshire, Wales. It is represented by one county councillor.

== Description ==
The Glanamman county ward covers the Cwmamman community wards of Grenig and Tircoed, which include the areas north and south of the village of Glanamman. The eastern half of Cwmamman is covered by the Garnant ward. The population of Glanamman ward at the 2011 census was 2,347.

A 2019 boundary review by the Local Government Boundary Commission for Wales recommended ward boundaries remain the same, but the name of the ward be changed from Glanamman to Glanaman, the standard Welsh spelling. The change was to take effect from the May 2022 local elections. However, the county council and news outlets continued to use the name Glanamman when reporting the 2022 Carmarthenshire County Council election.

== Representation ==
Glanamman became the name of a ward to Dinefwr Borough Council from 1987, electing two borough councillors at the 1987 and 1991 elections.

Glanamman became the name of an electoral ward to Dyfed County Council in 1989, electing a Labour Party councillor Jack Davies at the 1989 and 1993 elections (Davies had been councillor for the Cwmamman ward prior to 1989).

Glanamman became an electoral ward to Carmarthenshire County Council in 1995, represented by one county councillor since the 1995 election.

== Carmarthenshire County Council elections ==
* retiring councillor in the ward standing for re-election

=== 2022 ===
Nation.Cymru highlighted Glanamman as one of the wards in Wales to watch, during the 2022 local elections. The Amman Valley was a battle ground between Plaid Cymru and the Labour Party, with Glanamman a marginal seat held by Plaid. The ward was won by Labour's Emyr Rees, though Labour lost seats overall on the council. Rees's campaign focused on improving the local bus service.

Carmarthenshire County Council election, 5 May 2022
Party	Candidate	Votes	%	±%
Labour	Emyr Rees	423	56.18	+8.59
Plaid Cymru	David Jenkins*	330	43.82	−8.59

=== 2017 ===
The Carmarthenshire Herald described this contest as the "battle of the David Jenkinses".

Carmarthenshire County Council election, 4 May 2017
Party	Candidate	Votes	%	±%
Plaid Cymru	David Michael Jenkins*	413	52.41	
Labour	David Emyr Jenkins	375	47.59	
