= Pontamman =

Former electoral ward in Carmarthenshire, Wales

Coordinates: 51.795°N 3.980°W

Pontamman was the name of an electoral ward for Carmarthenshire County Council, which included parts of the town and community of Ammanford, Carmarthenshire, Wales. It was represented by one county councillor.

== Description ==
The Pontamman ward covered the town Ammanford Town Council wards of Myddynfych and Wernddu, and was unique in Wales by virtue of being divided into two parts, by a strip of the neighbouring ward of Ammanford.

The Wernddu ward includes the residential areas of Hopkinstown and Pontamman, as well as part of Ammanford High Street.

The population of the Pontamman ward at the 2011 census was 2,749.

A 2019 boundary review by the Local Government Boundary Commission for Wales recommended that Pontamman be merged with the Ammanford ward, to become a two-member ward called Ammanford. The change took effect from the May 2022 local elections.

== Representation ==
Pontamman was the name of a ward to Dinefwr Borough Council at the 1987 and 1991 elections, represented by one borough councillor, Kenneth Rees of the Labour Party.

Pontamman became a ward to Carmarthenshire County Council at the 1995 election, with Kenneth Rees winning the ward without contest. Rees also held the ward uncontested at the 1999 election. The 2004 and 2008 elections saw Labour's Lyn Llewellyn and Plaid Cymru's Marie Binney competing against one another, with Llewellyn winning in 2004 and Binney winning in 2008. Binney lost to Labour's Colin Evans in 2012.

Evans won the ward again at the 2017 election for Labour, but in September 2019 defected to Plaid Cymru, citing disagreements about the direction the Labour Party were going under Jeremy Corbyn.

== Elections ==
=== 2017 ===
Carmarthenshire County Council election, 4 May 2017
Party	Candidate	Votes	%	±%
Labour	David Colin Evans	675	62.9	
Plaid Cymru	Trevor Smith	333	31.5	
UKIP	Barry Wiltshire	60	5.7	
Majority		342		
Labour hold		Swing		
