= Carmarthen Town South =

Former electoral ward in Carmarthenshire, Wales

Carmarthen Town South was an electoral ward, representing part of the community of Carmarthen, Carmarthenshire, Wales. Much of its southern border was defined by the River Towy, with the Carmarthen Town North and Carmarthen Town West wards to the north.

== Profile ==
In 2014, the Carmarthen Town South electoral ward had an electorate of 2,896. The total population was 3,785, of whom 70.6% were born in Wales. The 2011 census indicated that 38.2% of the population were able to speak Welsh.

== History ==
Carmarthen Town South was an electoral ward since the 1940s. It was previously known as Carmarthen Town No.2 Ward. It became a two-member electoral ward for the purposes of elections to Carmarthenshire County Council. It corresponded to the South ward which elects five members to Carmarthen Town Council.

From 1973 until 1996 it was a single-member ward for the purposes of elections to Dyfed County Council and a two-member ward for elections to Carmarthen District Council.

Following a boundary review by the Local Democracy and Boundary Commission for Wales, Carmarthen Town South was merged with Carmarthen Town North to be called Carmarthen Town North and South, effective from the May 2022 local elections. The new ward saw an overall reduction in councillors from four to three.

== Current Representation ==
Since 2017 the ward was represented by Plaid Cymru councillors Gareth John and Alun Lenny.

=== Carmarthen Town South (two seats) ===
Carmarthen Town South 2017
| Party | Candidate | Votes | % | ±% |
|---|---|---|---|---|
| Plaid Cymru | Gareth Howell John | 551 | | |
| Plaid Cymru | Alun John Edwin Lenny* | 493 | | |
| Conservative | Charlie Evans | 399 | | |
| Labour | Philip William Grice | 361 | | |
| Independent | Barry Williams | 303 | | |
| Turnout | | | | |
| Plaid Cymru hold | | Swing | | |
| Plaid Cymru hold | | Swing | | |

== Carmarthenshire County Council from 1995 ==
=== 1995 Carmarthenshire County Council election ===
In 1995, Dr Margaret Evans, a Liberal Democrat member of Carmarthen District Council since 1991 and Russell Davies, a Labour member of the same authority since 1979 were elected as the ward's first representatives on the new Carmarthenshire County Council.

Carmarthen Town South
| Party | Candidate | Votes | % | ±% |
|---|---|---|---|---|
| Liberal Democrats | Dr Margaret Elizabeth Evans* | 982 | | |
| Labour | John Russell Davies* | 808 | | |
| Independent | Richard John Goodridge | 682 | | |
| Liberal Democrats hold | | Swing | | |
| Labour gain from Independent | | Swing | | |

=== 1999 Carmarthenshire County Council election ===
One of the seats was won by the Liberal Democrats in 1995 but lost to an Independent at a by-election following the death of the sitting member. The sitting Labour councillor, who had served on Carmarthen District Councuil since 1979, was de-selected by the party but was re-elected as an Independent Labour candidate.

Carmarthen Town South
| Party | Candidate | Votes | % | ±% |
|---|---|---|---|---|
| Independent | June Williams* | 774 | | |
| Independent Labour | John Russell Davies* | 551 | | |
| Plaid Cymru | Geraint Thomas | 547 | | |
| Labour | Philip William Grice | 397 | | |
| Labour | Mandy Diane Peters | 321 | | |
| Independent hold | | Swing | | |
| Independent Labour gain from Labour | | Swing | | |

=== 2004 Carmarthenshire County Council election ===
Following the retirement of the Independent Labour (and former Labour) councillor, Russell Davies, the seat was won by a Labour candidate.

Carmarthen Town South
| Party | Candidate | Votes | % | ±% |
|---|---|---|---|---|
| Independent | June Williams* | 443 | | |
| Labour | Philip William Grice | 551 | | |
| Plaid Cymru | David Jonathan Edwards | 309 | | |
| Independent | Rob James | 301 | | |
| Independent | Jennifer Fox | 289 | | |
| Plaid Cymru | Jonathan Mendus Edwards | 245 | | |
| Independent hold | | Swing | | |
| Labour gain from Independent Labour | | Swing | | |

=== 2008 Carmarthenshire County Council election ===
Both sitting members were defeated.

Carmarthen Town South 2008
| Party | Candidate | Votes | % | ±% |
|---|---|---|---|---|
| Plaid Cymru | Dafydd Arwel Lloyd | 626 | | |
| Independent | Stephen Paul Dunn | 369 | | |
| Independent | June Williams* | 361 | | |
| Labour | Philip William Grice* | 356 | | |
| Independent | Dudley Evans | 231 | | |
| Plaid Cymru gain from Labour | | Swing | | |
| Independent hold | | Swing | | |

=== 2012 Carmarthenshire County Council election ===
Plaid Cymru held both seats with the sitting members again returned.
