= Carmarthen Town North =

Former electoral ward in Carmarthenshire, Wales

Carmarthen Town North was an electoral ward, representing part of the community of Carmarthen, Carmarthenshire, Wales.

== Profile ==
In 2014, the Carmarthen Town North electoral ward had an electorate of 3,984. The total population was 5,151, of whom 77.1% were born in Wales. The 2011 census indicated that 37.4% of the population were able to speak Welsh.

== History ==
Carmarthen Town North was an electoral ward since the 1937. It was previously known as Carmarthen Town No.1 Ward. It became a two-member electoral ward for the purposes of elections to Carmarthenshire County Council. The corresponding North ward elects seven members to Carmarthen Town Council.

From 1973 until 1996 it was a single-member ward for the purposes of elections to Dyfed County Council and a four-member ward for elections to Carmarthen District Council.

From 1937 until 1973 it was a single-member ward for the purposes of elections to the previous Carmarthenshire County Council.

Following a boundary review by the Local Democracy and Boundary Commission for Wales, Carmarthen Town North was merged with Carmarthen Town South to be called Carmarthen Town North and South, effective from the May 2022 local elections. The new ward saw an overall reduction in councillors from four to three.

== Carmarthenshire County Council elections ==
=== 1995 ===
In 1995, Ken Maynard, a Labour member of Dyfed County Council since 1985 and David Merriman, an Independent member of Carmarthen District Council since 1976 were elected as the ward's first representatives on the new Carmarthenshire County Council.

Carmarthen Town North 1995
Party	Candidate	Votes	%	±%
Labour	Kenneth Bryan Maynard+	1,431		
Independent	David Howell Merriman*	1,117		
Labour	Douglas Edmund Ynyr Richards Rose	849		
Conservative	Jane Ann Jones	279		
Labour win (new seat)				
Independent win (new seat)				

=== 1999 ===
In 1999, both sitting members were re-elected but were closely challenged by Plaid Cymru candidate Llyr Huws Griffiths.

Carmarthen Town North 1999
Party	Candidate	Votes	%	±%
Labour	Kenneth Bryan Maynard*	1,014		
Independent	David Howell Merriman*	979		
Plaid Cymru	Llyr Hughes Griffiths	965		
Labour	Richard Evans	658		
Labour hold		Swing		
Independent hold		Swing		

=== 2004 ===
At the 2004 election, Ken Maynard, a county councillor since 1985 stood down and David Merriman, a district and county councillor since 1976 sought (unsuccessfully) to be elected for the neighbouring Carmarthen Town West ward. Both seats were captured for the first time by Plaid Cymru.

Carmarthen Town North 2004
Party	Candidate	Votes	%	±%
Plaid Cymru	Peter Hughes Griffiths	767		
Plaid Cymru	Jeffrey Thomas	584		
Labour	Michael Stewart Elias	562		
Labour	Richard Evans	491		
Independent	Jeremy John	360		
Independent	Kevin Davies	214		
Plaid Cymru gain from Labour		Swing		
Plaid Cymru gain from Independent		Swing		

=== 2008 ===
Plaid Cymru held both seats in 2008 Carmarthenshire County Council election, with Gareth O. Jones replacing Jeff Thomas who stood down.

Carmarthen Town North 2008
Party	Candidate	Votes	%	±%
Plaid Cymru	Peter Hughes Griffiths*	1,058		
Plaid Cymru	Gareth Owen Jones	740		
Labour	Douglas Edmund Ynyr Richards Rose	462		
Independent	David Neil Lewis	461		
Plaid Cymru hold		Swing		
Plaid Cymru hold		Swing		

=== 2012 ===
Plaid Cymru held both seats in 2012 with the sitting members again returned.

Carmarthen Town North 2012
Party	Candidate	Votes	%	±%
Plaid Cymru	Peter Hughes Griffiths*	824		
Plaid Cymru	Gareth Owen Jones*	657		
Independent	Michael Stewart Elias	501		
Labour	Douglas Edmund Ynyr Richards Rose	480		
Independent	Paschal Haughey	201		
Turnout			38.8	
Plaid Cymru hold		Swing		
Plaid Cymru hold		Swing		

=== 2017 ===
At the May 2017 elections Labour's Ken Lloyd, a Carmarthen Town councillor, captured one of the Plaid Cymru seats.

Carmarthen Town North 2017
Party	Candidate	Votes	%	±%
Labour	Kenneth Lloyd	805		
Plaid Cymru	Peter Hughes Griffiths*	765		
Plaid Cymru	Gareth Owen Jones*	581		
Independent	Les Clark	489		
Turnout				
Labour gain from Plaid Cymru		Swing		
Plaid Cymru hold		Swing		
