= Betws, Carmarthenshire (electoral ward) =

Electoral ward in Carmarthenshire, Wales

Betws is an electoral ward, representing part of the community of Betws, near Ammanford, Carmarthenshire, Wales.

== Profile ==
In 2014, the Betws electoral ward had an electorate of xxx. The total population was xxx, of whom xxx were born in Wales. xxxx% of the population were able to speak Welsh.

== Current representation ==
The Betws Ward is a single-member ward for the purposes of Carmarthenshire County Council elections. Since 2012 it has been represented by Plaid Cymru councillor Betsan Wyn Jones.

== Recent history ==
The first election to the new unitary Carmarthenshire County Council took place in 1995. Dorian Evans won the seat by a comfortable majority.

Betws, 1995
Party	Candidate	Votes	%	±%
Labour	John Dorian Evans	442		
Plaid Cymru	Brian Keith Vaughan	200		
Independent	William Gwyn Thomas	36		
Majority		242		
Labour hold		Swing		

In 1999, Evans was re-elected.

Betws 1999
Party	Candidate	Votes	%	±%
Labour	John Dorian Evans*	484		
Plaid Cymru	Brian Keith Vaughan	331		
Majority		153		
Labour hold		Swing		

Evans faced opposition from Plaid Cymru in 2004 but the majority fell to 30 votes.

Betws 2004
Party	Candidate	Votes	%	±%
Labour	John Dorian Evans*	329		
Plaid Cymru	Charlotte Price	299		
Majority		30		
Labour hold		Swing		

In 2008, Evans was beaten into third place as the seat was won by an Independent candidate.

Betws 2008
Party	Candidate	Votes	%	±%
Independent	Eira Audrey Jones	274		
Plaid Cymru	Annette Price	224		
Labour	John Dorian Evans*	217		
Majority		50		
Independent gain from Labour		Swing		

In 2012, Labour having held the seat from 1995 until 2008, came from third place to recapture Betws with a new candidate

Betws 2012
Party	Candidate	Votes	%	±%
Labour	Ryan Bartlett	325		
Independent	Eira Audrey Jones*	274		
Plaid Cymru	Annette Price	155		
Majority		51		
Turnout			44.3	
Labour gain from Independent		Swing		

== Earlier History ==
=== County Council Elections ===
Betws first became an electoral ward for county elections in the early twentieth century, having initially been part of the Llandybie ward at the formation of Carmarthenshire County Council. In due course, it became part of one of the two Ammanford wards for county council elections and these continued to exist until Carmarthenshire was abolished in 1974.

With the formation of Dyfed County Council, Betws was part of one of the Ammanford wards. The two wards were merged in 1989.

When the current Carmarthenshire County Council was formed in 1995, a Betws ward, based on the boundaries of the existing ward for the purposes of elections to Dinefwr Borough Council was established.

=== District Council Elections ===
From 1894 until 1973, Betws formed an electoral ward for the purposes of elections to Llandeilo Rural District Council.

Following re-organization in 1973, and until the creation of unitary authorities in 1996, Betws formed an electoral ward for the purposes of elections to Dinefwr Borough Council.
