= Carmarthen Town North and South =

Electoral ward in Carmarthenshire, Wales

Coordinates: 51.853°N 4.317°W

Carmarthen Town North and South (Welsh: Gogledd a De Tref Caerfyrddin) is an electoral ward for Carmarthenshire County Council in Carmarthen, Wales. It is represented by three county councillors.

The ward was created following a boundary review by the Local Democracy and Boundary Commission for Wales (LDBCW), with Carmarthen Town North merged with Carmarthen Town South, effective from the May 2022 local elections. The new ward saw an overall reduction in councillors for those parts of Carmarthen, from four to three. There was opposition to these changes from Carmarthen Town Council, who pointed out that the population of the town was growing, the new ward boundary was not easily identifiable and the ward included the businesses of Carmarthen town centre, which generated a lot of extra work for councillors.

The ward stretches from the Carmarthen Showground in the west, to Glangwili Hospital in the east. It is centred on Carmarthen town centre, also including the areas of Llanllwch, Johnstown and Tanerdy. Carmarthen Town West ward covers the remaining northwest quadrant of Carmarthen. The electorate of this ward, according to the 2019 LDBCW report, was 6,623.

== 2022 local election ==
Carmarthen Town North and South was seen as one of the key battlegrounds in the 2022 elections, following its boundary changes and reduction in the number of councillors. Competition was extremely close between Plaid Cymru and the Labour Party, the latter missing out on a seat by only 6 votes. Plaid Cymru's Peter Hughes Griffiths (formerly of Carmarthen Town North), Gareth John and Alun Lenny (formerly of Carmarthen Town South) won the seats.

Carmarthenshire County Council election, 5 May 2022
Party	Candidate	Votes	%	±%
Plaid Cymru	Peter Hughes Griffiths^{o}	1,188	47.31	
Plaid Cymru	Gareth Howell John^{o}	1,178		
Plaid Cymru	Alun Lenny^{o}	1,073		
Labour	Nia Maynard	1,067	42.50	
Labour	Mike Maynard	1,063		
Labour	Amanda Aldridge	971		
Green	Bar Rowlands	256	10.19	
Turnout		6,796	37.08	N/A

^{o} = councillor for a related ward, standing for re-election
