= Dafen =

Dafen may refer to:

== China ==
- Dafen, Jiangxi (大汾镇), town in Suichuan County
- Dafen, Shenzhen (大芬村), village in Buji Subdistrict, Longgang District

== Wales ==
- Dafen, Carmarthenshire, a village near Llanelli
  - Dafen (electoral ward)
