= 1973 Dinefwr Borough Council election =

1973 Welsh local government election

The first election to Dinefwr Borough Council following the re-organization of local government in Wales was held in May 1973. It was followed by the 1976 election. On the same day there were Local elections to the other District local authorities and community councils in Wales.

== Results ==
=== Ammanford Town Ward 1 (one seat) ===
Ammanford Town Ward 1 1973
Party	Candidate	Votes	%	±%
Labour	T. Clifford	unopposed		
Labour win (new seat)				

=== Ammanford Town Ward 2 (one seat) ===
Ammanford Town Ward 2 1973
Party	Candidate	Votes	%	±%
Independent	B.J.B. Williams	382	54.5	
Labour	Glyn M. Harries	243	34.7	
Plaid Cymru	M. James	76	10.8	
Majority			19.8	
Turnout				
Independent win (new seat)				

=== Ammanford Town Ward 3 (one seat) ===
Ammanford Town Ward 3 1973
Party	Candidate	Votes	%	±%
Labour	S. Batsford	233	47.0	
Plaid Cymru	Dr D.H. Davies	223	45.0	
Independent	W. Neal	40	8.1	
Majority		10	2.0	
Turnout				
Labour win (new seat)				

=== Ammanford Town Ward 4 (one seat) ===
Ammanford Town Ward 4 1973
Party	Candidate	Votes	%	±%
Labour	A.H. Phillips	unopposed		
Labour win (new seat)				

=== Ammanford Town Ward 5 (one seat) ===
Ammanford Town Ward 5 1973
Party	Candidate	Votes	%	±%
Labour	B.G. Williams	426	87.5	
Plaid Cymru	H. Evans	61	12.5	
Majority			74.9	
Turnout				
Labour win (new seat)				

=== Betws (one seat) ===
Betws 1973
Party	Candidate	Votes	%	±%
Independent	D. Thomas	355	76.0	
Plaid Cymru	S. Jenkins	112	24.0	
Majority				
Turnout				
Independent win (new seat)				

=== Brynamman (one seat) ===
Brynamman 1973
Party	Candidate	Votes	%	±%
Independent Socialist	E.R. Thomas	479	57.8	
Labour	A. Jones	350	42.2	
Majority		129	15.6	
Turnout				
Independent Labour win (new seat)				

=== Cilycwm (one seat) ===
Cilycwm 1973
Party	Candidate	Votes	%	±%
Independent	R. Griffiths	269	50.4	
Independent	I. Davies	265	49.6	
Majority		4	0.8	
Turnout				
Independent win (new seat)				

=== Cwmamman (three seats) ===
Cwmamman 1973
Party	Candidate	Votes	%	±%
Labour	D. Rees	1,150		
Labour	Gwynfryn Davies	1,039		
Liberal	S. Griffiths	929		
Labour	J. Davies	886		
Turnout				
Labour win (new seat)				
Labour win (new seat)				
Liberal win (new seat)				

=== Cwmllynfell (one seat) ===
Cwmllynfell 1973
Party	Candidate	Votes	%	±%
Labour	W. Thomas	unopposed		
Labour win (new seat)				

=== Cynwyl Gaeo and Llanwrda (one seat) ===
Cynwyl Gaeo and Llanwrda 1973
Party	Candidate	Votes	%	±%
Independent	Cyril Lewis Lloyd	unopposed		
Independent win (new seat)				

=== Glynamman (one seat) ===
Glynamman 1973
Party	Candidate	Votes	%	±%
Labour	L. Morgan	483	67.8	
Plaid Cymru	D. Thomas	229	32.2	
Majority				
Turnout				
Labour win (new seat)				

=== Llandeilo Fawr North Ward (one seat) ===
Llandeilo Fawr North Ward 1973
Party	Candidate	Votes	%	±%
Independent	P. Jenkins	unopposed		
Independent win (new seat)				

=== Llandeilo Fawr South Ward (one seat) ===
Llandeilo Fawr South Ward 1973
Party	Candidate	Votes	%	±%
Independent	W.R. Price	298	54.5	
Plaid Cymru	D. Richards	249	45.5	
Majority		49	9.0	
Turnout				
Independent win (new seat)				

=== Llandeilo Town (two seats) ===
Llandeilo Town 1973
Party	Candidate	Votes	%	±%
Independent	D. Hughes	434		
Independent	D.R. Williams	391		
Independent	T. Beynon	296		
Plaid Cymru	P. Roderick	254		
Independent	D. Jones	222		
Independent	A. Jones	182		
Liberal	D. Davies	108		
Turnout				
Independent win (new seat)				
Independent win (new seat)				

=== Llanddeusant / Myddfai (one seat) ===
Llanddeusant / Myddfai 1973
Party	Candidate	Votes	%	±%
Independent	F.R. Jones	unopposed		
Independent win (new seat)				

=== Llandovery Town (two seats) ===
Llandovery Town 1973
Party	Candidate	Votes	%	±%
Independent	David Hamilton Evans	542		
Independent	H. Jones	529		
Independent	William Perry	516		
Independent	S. Jones	322		
Turnout				
Independent win (new seat)				
Independent win (new seat)				

=== Llandybie and Heolddu (three seats) ===
Llandybie and Heolddu 1973
Party	Candidate	Votes	%	±%
Labour	I. Morgan	1,273		
Labour	Herbert Brynmor Lewis Samways	1,261		
Labour	W. Jones	801		
Independent	R. Evans	666		
Plaid Cymru	S. Owen	491		
Turnout				
Labour win (new seat)				
Labour win (new seat)				
Labour win (new seat)				

=== Llanegwad and Llanfynydd (one seat) ===
Llanegwad and Llanfynydd 1973
Party	Candidate	Votes	%	±%
Independent	R.P. Morgan	605	73.9	
Plaid Cymru	H. Williams	214	26.1	
Majority			47.7	
Turnout				
Independent win (new seat)				

=== Llanfihangel Aberbythych and Llangathen (one seat) ===
Llanfihangel Aberbythych and Llangathen 1973
Party	Candidate	Votes	%	±%
Labour	D. Pugh	530	56.0	
Independent	A. Bryer	348	36.8	
Plaid Cymru	D. Williams	68	7.2	
Majority			19.2	
Turnout				
Labour win (new seat)				

=== Llangadog and Llansadwrn (one seat) ===
Llangadog and Llansadwrn 1973
Party	Candidate	Votes	%	±%
Independent	J. Barr	unopposed		
Independent win (new seat)				

=== Llansawel and Talley (one seat) ===
Llansawel and Talley 1973
Party	Candidate	Votes	%	±%
Independent	John Gwilym Evans	311	65.9	
Independent	J. Davies	161	34.1	
Majority			31.8	
Turnout				
Independent win (new seat)				

=== Penygroes (two seats) ===
Penygroes 1973
Party	Candidate	Votes	%	±%
Labour	E.B. Davies	703		
Independent	T. Pearce	655		
Plaid Cymru	Lynne Davies	526		
Turnout				
Labour win (new seat)				
Independent win (new seat)				

=== Saron (two seats) ===
Saron 1973
Party	Candidate	Votes	%	±%
Labour	Douglas Davies	695		
Labour	W. Jones	621		
Plaid Cymru	W. Jones	482		
Turnout				
Labour win (new seat)				
Labour win (new seat)				
