= 1979 Dinefwr Borough Council election =

Local election in Wales

An election to Dinefwr Borough Council was held in May 1979. It was preceded by the 1976 election and followed by the 1983 election. On the same day there was a UK general election and elections to the other district local authorities and community councils in Wales.

A small number of seats changed hands and it appeared that Plaid Cymru held the balance of power on the authority with Labour and the Independents winning a similar number of seats.

== Results ==
=== Ammanford Town Ward 1 (one seat) ===
Ammanford Town Ward 1 1979
Party	Candidate	Votes	%	±%
Labour	Kenneth Alvan Rees	unopposed		
Majority				
Turnout				
Labour hold		Swing		

=== Ammanford Town Ward 2 (one seat) ===
Ammanford Town Ward 2 1979
Party	Candidate	Votes	%	±%
Labour	B.J.B. Williams	unopposed		
Majority				
Turnout				
Labour hold		Swing		

=== Ammanford Town Ward 3 (one seat) ===
Ammanford Town Ward 3 1979
Party	Candidate	Votes	%	±%
Plaid Cymru	Dr D.H. Davies*	331	51.6	
Labour	S.J.H. Batsford	310	48.4	
Majority		21		
Turnout				
Plaid Cymru hold		Swing		

=== Ammanford Town Ward 4 (one seat) ===
Ammanford Town Ward 4 1979
Party	Candidate	Votes	%	±%
Labour	A.H. Phillips*	unopposed		
Majority				
Turnout				
Labour hold		Swing		

=== Ammanford Town Ward 5 (one seat) ===
Ammanford Town Ward 5 1983
Party	Candidate	Votes	%	±%
Labour	B.G. Williams*	455	69.3	
Plaid Cymru	D.H. Davies	202	30.7	
Majority		253		
Turnout				
Labour hold		Swing		

=== Betws (one seat) ===
Betws 1979
Party	Candidate	Votes	%	±%
Labour	David Arnallt James*	412	68.9	
Independent	E.H. Thomas	186	31.1	
Majority			37.8	
Turnout				
Labour hold		Swing		

=== Brynamman (one seat) ===
Brynamman 1979
Party	Candidate	Votes	%	±%
Ind. Socialist	E.R. Thomas*	430	51.3	
Labour	D.A. Nicholas	408	48.7	
Majority		22		
Turnout				
Ind. Socialist hold		Swing		

=== Cilycwm (one seat) ===
Cilycwm 1979
Party	Candidate	Votes	%	±%
Independent	Thomas Theophilus*	unopposed		
Majority				
Turnout				
Independent hold		Swing		

=== Cwmamman (three seats) ===
Cwmamman 1976
Party	Candidate	Votes	%	±%
Independent	Peter Dewi Richards*	1,653		
Labour	Gwynfryn Davies*	1,240		
Labour	David Ronald Harris	1,128		
Labour	D.H.J. Wyatt	998		
Plaid Cymru	John Edwin Lewis	805		
Plaid Cymru	Dafydd Wyn	492		
Turnout				
Independent hold		Swing		
Labour hold		Swing		
Labour hold		Swing		

=== Cwmllynfell (one seat) ===
Cwmllynfell 1979
Party	Candidate	Votes	%	±%
Labour	Elwyn Williams	505	71.1	
Independent	W. Morgan	199	28.3	
Majority				
Turnout				
Labour hold		Swing		

=== Cynwyl Gaeo and Llanwrda (one seat) ===
Cynwyl Gaeo and Llanwrda 1979
Party	Candidate	Votes	%	±%
Independent	Cyril Lewis Lloyd*	unopposed		
Independent hold		Swing		

=== Glynamman (one seat) ===
Glynamman 1979
Party	Candidate	Votes	%	±%
Independent	Arthur Stanley Jones	427	51.6	
Labour	O. Davies	400	48.4	
Majority				
Turnout				
Independent gain from Labour		Swing		

=== Llandeilo Fawr North Ward (one seat) ===
Llandeilo Fawr North Ward 1979
Party	Candidate	Votes	%	±%
Independent	P. Jenkins*	unopposed		
Independent hold		Swing		

=== Llandeilo Fawr South Ward (one seat) ===
Llandeilo Fawr South Ward 1979
Party	Candidate	Votes	%	±%
Independent	W.R. Price*	unopposed		
Independent hold		Swing		

=== Llandeilo Town (two seats) ===
Llandeilo Town 1979
Party	Candidate	Votes	%	±%
Independent	D.R. Williams	752		
Independent	L.A. German*	590		
Independent	Elfryn Thomas*	561		
Turnout				
Independent hold		Swing		
Independent hold		Swing		

=== Llanddeusant / Myddfai (one seat) ===
Llanddeusant / Myddfai 1979
Party	Candidate	Votes	%	±%
Independent	F.R. Jones*	unopposed		
Independent hold		Swing		

=== Llandovery Town (two seats) ===
Llandovery Town 1979
Party	Candidate	Votes	%	±%
Independent	William Perry*	703		
Independent	David Hamilton Evans*	655		
Independent	J. Davies	630		
Turnout				
Independent hold		Swing		
Independent hold		Swing		

=== Llandybie and Heolddu (three seats) ===
Llandybie and Heolddu 1979
Party	Candidate	Votes	%	±%
Independent	Mary Helena Thomas*	1,857		
Labour	I. Morgan*	1,655		
Labour	Herbert Brynmor Lewis Samways*	1,573		
Plaid Cymru	Arwel Davies	955		
Turnout				
Independent hold		Swing		
Labour hold		Swing		
Labour hold		Swing		

=== Llanegwad and Llanfynydd (one seat) ===
Llanegwad and Llanfynydd 1976
Party	Candidate	Votes	%	±%
Independent	R.P. Morgan*	unopposed		
Independent hold		Swing		

=== Llanfihangel Aberbythych and Llangathen (one seat) ===
Llanfihangel Aberbythych and Llangathen 1979
Party	Candidate	Votes	%	±%
Independent	D. Pugh*	unopposed		
Independent hold		Swing		

=== Llangadog and Llansadwrn (one seat) ===
Llangadog and Llansadwrn 1979
Party	Candidate	Votes	%	±%
Plaid Cymru	Dafydd Prys Evans	unopposed		
Plaid Cymru gain from Independent		Swing		

=== Llansawel and Talley (one seat) ===
Llansawel and Talley 1979
Party	Candidate	Votes	%	±%
Independent	John Gwilym Evans*	303	57.6	
Independent	B. Harries	223	42.4	
Majority				
Turnout				
Independent hold		Swing		

=== Penygroes (two seats) ===
Penygroes 1979
Party	Candidate	Votes	%	±%
Plaid Cymru	Lynne Davies*	1,043		
Labour	E.B. Davies*	782		
Labour	K. Jones	531		
Turnout				
Plaid Cymru hold		Swing		
Labour hold		Swing		

=== Saron (two seats) ===
Saron 1979
Party	Candidate	Votes	%	±%
Labour	Ken Williams	939		
Labour	D. Davies*	829		
Plaid Cymru	J.G. James	769		
Independent	E. Dent	559		
Turnout				
Labour hold		Swing		
Labour hold		Swing		
