= 1987 Dinefwr Borough Council election =

Local election in Wales

An election to Dinefwr Borough Council was held in May 1987. It was preceded by the 1983 election and followed by the 1991 election. On the same day there were elections to the other district local authorities and community councils in Wales.

== Boundary changes ==
There were a number of boundary changes and some wards were renamed although remaining essentially unchanged.

== Results ==
=== Betws (one seat) ===
Betws 1987
Party	Candidate	Votes	%	±%
Labour	David Arnallt James*	358		
Plaid Cymru	M. James	351		
Majority		7		
Labour hold		Swing		

=== Brynamman (one seat) ===
Brynamman 1987
Party	Candidate	Votes	%	±%
Labour	Vivien Rees	412		
Independent Socialist	E.R. Thomas*	170		
Labour gain from Ind. Socialist				

=== Cilycwm (one seat) ===
Cilycwm 1987
Party	Candidate	Votes	%	±%
Independent	Thomas Theophilus*	unopposed		
Independent hold		Swing		

=== Cwmllynfell (one seat) ===
Cwmllynfell 1987
Party	Candidate	Votes	%	±%
Labour	Elwyn Williams*	unopposed		
Labour hold		Swing		

=== Cynwyl Gaeo (one seat) ===
The ward used to be known as Cynwyl Gaeo

Cynwyl Gaeo 1987
Party	Candidate	Votes	%	±%
Independent	Cyril Lewis Lloyd*	unopposed		
Independent hold		Swing		

=== Ffairfach (one seat) ===
The ward used to be known as Llandeilo Fawr South.

Ffairfach 1987
Party	Candidate	Votes	%	±%
Independent	Harry Glenville Jones*	Unopposed		
Independent hold		Swing		

=== Garnant (two seats) ===
Boundary Change

Garnant 1987
Party	Candidate	Votes	%	±%
Labour	Kevin Madge	unopposed		
Labour	William Richard Murphy	unopposed		
Labour win (new seat)				
Labour win (new seat)				

=== Glanamman (two seats) ===
Boundary Change

Glanamman 1987
Party	Candidate	Votes	%	±%
Labour	David Ronald Harris*	764		
Labour	Gwynfryn Davies*	552		
Plaid Cymru	John Edwin Lewis	509		
Labour win (new seat)				
Labour win (new seat)				

=== Iscennen (one seat) ===
Boundary Change

Iscennen 1987
Party	Candidate	Votes	%	±%
Labour	Ronald Amman Davies	383		
Plaid Cymru	Dr D.H. Davies*	329		
Majority				
Labour win (new seat)				

=== Llandeilo Castle (one seat) ===
Boundary Change

Llandeilo Castle 1987
Party	Candidate	Votes	%	±%
Independent	L.A. German	188		
Plaid Cymru	R ap D Phillips	164		
Independent	I. Gwyn	107		
Independent win (new seat)				

=== Llandeilo Tywi (one seat) ===
Boundary Change

Llandeilo Tywi 1987
Party	Candidate	Votes	%	±%
Independent	M.E. German	212		
Independent	G.M. Still	209		
Independent win (new seat)				

=== Llandovery Town (two seats) ===
Llandovery Town 1987
Party	Candidate	Votes	%	±%
Plaid Cymru	Denley Owen*	850		
Independent	D.J.K. Whiskerd*	792		
Independent	W. Perry	350		
Alliance	J.P.M. Cheetham	163		
Independent	J.M. Barnes	84		
Plaid Cymru hold		Swing		
Independent hold		Swing		

=== Llandybie (three seats) ===
The ward used to be known as Llandybie and Heolddu.

Llandybie 1987
Party	Candidate	Votes	%	±%
Independent	Mary Helena Thomas*	1,298		
Labour	Brenda Vivien Evans*	1,103		
Labour	Herbert Brynmor Lewis Samways*	1,073		
Plaid Cymru	Sarah Ann Nesta Price	993		
Independent hold		Swing		
Labour hold		Swing		
Labour hold		Swing		

=== Llanegwad (one seat) ===
The ward used to be known as Llanegwad and Llanfynydd .

Llanegwad 1987
Party	Candidate	Votes	%	±%
Independent	R.P. Morgan*	unopposed		
Independent hold		Swing		

=== Llangadog (one seat) ===
The ward used to be known as Llangadog and Llansadwrn.

Llangadog 1987
Party	Candidate	Votes	%	±%
Independent	Glyndwr Thomas Davies*	unopposed		
Independent hold		Swing		

=== Llangathen (one seat) ===
The ward used to be known as Llanfihangel Aberbythych and Llangathen

Llangathen 1987
Party	Candidate	Votes	%	±%
Independent	David Arthur Jones*	unopposed		
Independent hold		Swing		

=== Llansawel (one seat) ===
The ward used to be known as Llansawel and Talley.

Llansawel 1987
Party	Candidate	Votes	%	±%
Independent	J.G. Evans*	unopposed		
Independent hold		Swing		

=== Manordeilo (one seat) ===
The ward used to be known as Llandeilo Fawr North

Manordeilo 1987
Party	Candidate	Votes	%	±%
Independent	J. Davies*	unopposed		
Independent hold		Swing		

=== Myddfai (one seat) ===
The ward used to be known as Llanddeusant and Myddfai

Myddfai 1987
Party	Candidate	Votes	%	±%
Independent	F.R. Jones*	326		
Independent	S.P. Barnes	28		
Majority		298		
Independent hold		Swing		

=== Pantyffynnon (one seat) ===
Boundary Change

Pantyffynnon 1987
Party	Candidate	Votes	%	±%
Labour	B.J.B. Williams*	unopposed		
Labour win (new seat)				

=== Penygroes (two seats) ===
Penygroes 1987
Party	Candidate	Votes	%	±%
Plaid Cymru	Lynne Davies*	unopposed		
Labour	E.B. Davies	unopposed		
Plaid Cymru hold		Swing		
Labour gain from Plaid Cymru		Swing		

=== Pontamman (one seat) ===
Boundary Change

Pontamman 1987
Party	Candidate	Votes	%	±%
Labour	Kenneth Alvan Rees*	unopposed		
Labour win (new seat)				

=== Quarter Bach (one seat) ===
The ward used to be known as Glynamman

Quarter Bach 1987
Party	Candidate	Votes	%	±%
Socialist	A.S. Jones*	429		
Labour	J.R. Griffin	216		
Majority				
Socialist hold		Swing		

=== Saron (two seats) ===
Saron 1987
Party	Candidate	Votes	%	±%
Labour	T.H. Marshall	699		
Labour	I.M. Thomas*	687		
Independent Labour	Douglas Davies*	627		
Plaid Cymru	J.G. James	479		
Labour hold		Swing		
Labour hold		Swing		

=== Tirydail (one seat) ===
Boundary Change

Tirydail 1983
Party	Candidate	Votes	%	±%
Labour	J. Panes	unopposed		
Labour win (new seat)				
