= Ammanford (electoral ward) =

Electoral ward in Carmarthenshire, Wales

- Ward
- Location in Wales
- Coordinates: 51°47′34″N 3°59′12″W
- Country: United Kingdom
- Province: Wales
- County: Carmarthenshire
- Community: Ammanford

Ammanford is an electoral ward to Carmarthenshire County Council, representing the community of Ammanford, Carmarthenshire, Wales.

== Profile ==
According to the 2001 UK Census, the Ammanford ward had a population of 2,664 of whom 2,347 were born in Wales and 1,599 were able to speak Welsh.

Prior to May 2022 the Ammanford ward covered only part of the town, namely the Iscennen and Pantyffynnon town wards. The other two town wards, Myddynfych and Wernddu, formed the Pontamman county ward. Following a boundary review, the two county wards were combined, with a two-councillor representation, to take effect from the May 2022 local elections.

== Representation ==
The Ammanford Ward was a single-member ward until May 2022 for the purposes of Carmarthenshire County Council elections. Since 2022 it has been represented by two county councillors.

Between 1989 and 1996, Ammanford was a county ward, including the whole of Ammanford town and neighbouring Betws, electing one councillor to Dyfed County Council.

== Election history ==
The first election to the new unitary Carmarthenshire County Council took place in 1995. Meinir Thomas, who had represented the ward on the former Dinefwr Borough Council was elected by a small majority over the Labour candidate.

Ammanford 1995
Party	Candidate	Votes	%	±%
Independent	Meinir Thomas*	304		
Labour	Shireen Davies	299		
Majority		5		
Independent hold		Swing		

Boundary changes in 1999 saw the Ammanford ward merged with the Pantyffynnon ward to create a new ward which was named Ammanford. The two sitting councillors opposed each other and Michael Hugh Evans, who previously represented Pantyffynnon, defeated Meinir Thomas.

Ammanford 1999
Party	Candidate	Votes	%	±%
Labour	Michael Hugh Evans*	780		
Independent	Meinir Thomas*	493		
Majority		287		
Labour win (new seat)				

Evans faced opposition from Plaid Cymru in 2004 but comfortably retained the seat.

Ammanford 2004
Party	Candidate	Votes	%	±%
Labour	Michael Hugh Evans*	636		
Plaid Cymru	David Thomas	337		
Majority		299		
Labour hold		Swing		

In 2008, Evans's majority was significantly reduced a Plaid Cymru opponent.

Ammanford 2008
Party	Candidate	Votes	%	±%
Labour	Michael Hugh Evans*	457		
Plaid Cymru	Deian Harries	451		
Majority		6		
Labour hold		Swing		

Evans stood down at the 2012 and his successor as Labour candidate was defeated by Plaid Cymru.

Ammanford 2012
Party	Candidate	Votes	%	±%
Plaid Cymru	Deian Harries	480		
Labour	Chris Jones	455		
Majority		25		
Turnout			48.3	
Plaid Cymru gain from Labour		Swing		

== Earlier History ==
=== County Council Elections ===
Ammanford first became an electoral ward in the early twentieth century, having initially been part of the Betws ward at the formation of Carmarthenshire County Council. In due course two wards were created at Ammanford for county council elections and these continued to exist until Carmarthenshire was abolished in 1974.

With the formation of Dyfed County Council, Ammanford continued to elect two councillors until the wards were merged in 1989.

When the current Carmarthenshire County Council was formed in 1995, an Ammanford ward based on the boundaries for elections similar to those in existence between 1889 and 1974 was re-established.

=== District Council Elections ===
From 1973 until 1996, Ammanford formed an electoral ward for the purposes of elections to Dinefwr Borough Council.
