= 1976 Dinefwr Borough Council election =

Election to Dinefwr Borough Council

An election to Dinefwr Borough Council was held in May 1976. It was preceded by the 1973 election and followed by the 1979 election. On the same day there was UK local elections and elections to the other district local authorities and community councils in Wales.

Labour held most seats in the more urbanised part of the authority while the rural seats were all won by Independents. Plaid Cymru captured two seats from Labour at Ammanford and Penygroes.

== Results ==
=== Ammanford Town Ward 1 (one seat) ===
Ammanford Town Ward 1 1976
Party	Candidate	Votes	%	±%
Labour	Kenneth Alvan Rees	444	56.8	
Plaid Cymru	D.H. Davies	338	43.2	
Majority				
Turnout				
Labour hold		Swing		

=== Ammanford Town Ward 2 (one seat) ===
Ammanford Town Ward 2 1976
Party	Candidate	Votes	%	±%
Independent	B.J.B. Williams	449	66.2	
Labour	Glyn M. Harries	229	33.8	
Majority				
Turnout				
Independent hold		Swing		

=== Ammanford Town Ward 3 (one seat) ===
Ammanford Town Ward 3 1976
Party	Candidate	Votes	%	±%
Plaid Cymru	Dr D.H. Davies	272	56.8	
Labour	S.J.H. Batsford*	207	43.2	
Majority		65		
Turnout				
Plaid Cymru gain from Labour		Swing		

=== Ammanford Town Ward 4 (one seat) ===
Ammanford Town Ward 4 1976
Party	Candidate	Votes	%	±%
Labour	A.H. Phillips*	Unopposed		
Labour hold		Swing		

=== Ammanford Town Ward 5 (one seat) ===
Ammanford Town Ward 5 1976
Party	Candidate	Votes	%	±%
Labour	B.G. Williams*	Unopposed		
Labour hold		Swing		

=== Betws (one seat) ===
Betws 1976
Party	Candidate	Votes	%	±%
Labour	David Daniel Thomas*	Unopposed		
Labour hold		Swing		

=== Brynamman (one seat) ===
Brynamman 1976
Party	Candidate	Votes	%	±%
Ind. Socialist	E.R. Thomas*	426	55.3	
Labour	W. Griffiths	358	45.7	
Majority			8.6	
Turnout			58.1	
Ind. Socialist hold		Swing		

=== Cilycwm (one seat) ===
Cilycwm 1976
Party	Candidate	Votes	%	±%
Independent	Thomas Theophilus	417	66.3	
Independent	I. Davies	133	21.1	−28.5
Independent	R. Griffiths*	79	12.6	
Majority				
Turnout			45.2	
Independent hold		Swing		

=== Cwmamman (three seats) ===
Cwmamman 1976
Party	Candidate	Votes	%	±%
Independent	Peter Dewi Richards	1,210		
Labour	Gwynfryn Davies*	1,163		
Labour	D.T.M. Rees*	1,142		
Labour	D.H.J. Wyatt	775		
Plaid Cymru	John Edwin Lewis	547		
Turnout				
Independent gain from Liberal		Swing		
Labour hold		Swing		
Labour hold		Swing		

=== Cwmllynfell (one seat) ===
Cwmllynfell 1976
Party	Candidate	Votes	%	±%
Labour	W. Thomas*	489	83.0	
Plaid Cymru	T. Jones	100	17.0	
Majority		389		
Turnout				
Labour hold		Swing		

=== Cynwyl Gaeo and Llanwrda (one seat) ===
Cynwyl Gaeo and Llanwrda 1976
Party	Candidate	Votes	%	±%
Independent	Cyril Lewis Lloyd*	398	55.3	
Labour	J.H. Evans	322	44.7	
Majority			10.6	
Turnout				
Independent hold		Swing		

=== Glynamman (one seat) ===
Glynamman 1976
Party	Candidate	Votes	%	±%
Labour	L. Morgan*	Unopposed		
Labour hold		Swing		

=== Llandeilo Fawr North Ward (one seat) ===
Llandeilo Fawr North Ward 1976
Party	Candidate	Votes	%	±%
Independent	P. Jenkins*	Unopposed		
Independent hold		Swing		

=== Llandeilo Fawr South Ward (one seat) ===
Llandeilo Fawr South Ward 1976
Party	Candidate	Votes	%	±%
Independent	W.R. Price*	247		
Independent	D.A. Richards	194		
Independent	W.T. Griffiths	184		
Majority				
Turnout				
Independent hold		Swing		

=== Llandeilo Town (two seats) ===
Llandeilo Town 1976
Party	Candidate	Votes	%	±%
Independent	L.A. German	514		
Independent	Elfryn Thomas	513		
Independent	D.R. Williams*	509		
Independent	M.H. Hughes	299		
Turnout				
Independent hold		Swing		
Independent hold		Swing		

=== Llanddeusant / Myddfai (one seat) ===
Llanddeusant / Myddfai 1976
Party	Candidate	Votes	%	±%
Independent	F.R. Jones*	Unopposed		
Majority				
Turnout				
Independent hold		Swing		

=== Llandovery Town (two seats) ===
Llandovery Town 1976
Party	Candidate	Votes	%	±%
Independent	David Hamilton Evans*	643		
Independent	William Perry	541		
Independent	J.E. Davies	439		
Independent	H.G. Jones*	347		
Turnout				
Independent hold		Swing		
Independent hold		Swing		

=== Llandybie and Heolddu (three seats) ===
Llandybie and Heolddu 1976
Party	Candidate	Votes	%	±%
Labour	Herbert Brynmor Lewis Samways*	1,148		
Labour	I. Morgan*	1,137		
Independent	Mary Helena Thomas	1,053		
Plaid Cymru	J. Evans	554		
Labour	W. Jones*	541		
Plaid Cymru	Arwel Davies	512		
Plaid Cymru	J. Roberts	498		
Turnout				
Labour hold		Swing		
Labour hold		Swing		
Independent gain from Labour		Swing		

=== Llanegwad and Llanfynydd (one seat) ===
Llanegwad and Llanfynydd 1976
Party	Candidate	Votes	%	±%
Independent	R.P. Morgan*	Unopposed		
Independent hold		Swing		

=== Llanfihangel Aberbythych and Llangathen (one seat) ===
Pugh had been elected as a Labour candidate in 1973.

Llanfihangel Aberbythych and Llangathen 1976
Party	Candidate	Votes	%	±%
Independent	D. Pugh*	488	53.7	
Independent	D.A. Jones	420	46.3	
Majority			7.4	
Turnout				
Independent gain from Labour		Swing		

=== Llangadog and Llansadwrn (one seat) ===
Llangadog and Llansadwrn 1976
Party	Candidate	Votes	%	±%
Independent	J. Barr*	480	55.2	
Plaid Cymru	Dafydd Prys Evans	389	44.8	
Majority		91	10.4	
Turnout				
Independent hold		Swing		

=== Llansawel and Talley (one seat) ===
Llansawel and Talley 1976
Party	Candidate	Votes	%	±%
Independent	John Gwilym Evans*	Unopposed		
Independent hold				

=== Penygroes (two seats) ===
Penygroes 1976
Party	Candidate	Votes	%	±%
Plaid Cymru	Lynne Davies	730		
Labour	E.B. Davies*	620		
Independent	T. Pearce*	524		
Turnout				
Plaid Cymru gain from Independent		Swing		
Labour hold		Swing		

=== Saron (two seats) ===
Saron 1976
Party	Candidate	Votes	%	±%
Labour	W. Jones*	734		
Labour	D. Davies*	660		
Plaid Cymru	J.G. James	506		
Turnout				
Labour hold		Swing		
Labour hold		Swing		
