= 1983 Dinefwr Borough Council election =

1983 Welsh local government election

An election to Dinefwr Borough Council was held in May 1983. It was preceded by the 1979 election and followed by the 1987 election. On the same day there were elections to the other district local authorities and community councils in Wales.

== Results ==
=== Ammanford Town Ward 1 (one seat) ===
Ammanford Town Ward 1 1983
Party	Candidate	Votes	%	±%
Labour	Kenneth Alvan Rees*	515		
Independent	M.B. Jones	126		
Majority				
Labour hold		Swing		

=== Ammanford Town Ward 2 (one seat) ===
Ammanford Town Ward 2 1983
Party	Candidate	Votes	%	±%
Labour	B.J.B. Williams*	Unopposed		
Labour hold				

=== Ammanford Town Ward 3 (one seat) ===
Ammanford Town Ward 3 1983
Party	Candidate	Votes	%	±%
Plaid Cymru	Dr D.H. Davies*	282		
Labour	Ronald Amman Davies	157		
Majority				
Plaid Cymru hold		Swing		

=== Ammanford Town Ward 4 (one seat) ===
Ammanford Town Ward 4 1983
Party	Candidate	Votes	%	±%
Labour	A.H. Phillips*	Unopposed		
Labour hold				

=== Ammanford Town Ward 5 (one seat) ===
Ammanford Town Ward 5 1983
Party	Candidate	Votes	%	±%
Labour	B.G. Williams*	Unopposed		
Labour hold				

=== Betws (one seat) ===
Betws 1983
Party	Candidate	Votes	%	±%
Labour	David Arnallt James*	Unopposed		
Labour hold				

=== Brynamman (one seat) ===
Brynamman 1983
Party	Candidate	Votes	%	±%
Ind. Socialist	E.R. Thomas*	339		
Labour	D.A. Nicholas	315		
Ind. Socialist hold		Swing		

=== Cilycwm (one seat) ===
Cilycwm 1983
Party	Candidate	Votes	%	±%
Independent	Thomas Theophilus*	Unopposed		
Independent hold				

=== Cwmamman (three seats) ===
Cwmamman 1983
Party	Candidate	Votes	%	±%
Labour	David Ronald Harris*	1,214		
Labour	Gwynfryn Davies*	917		
Independent	Peter Dewi Richards*	788		
Labour	D. Davies	786		
Plaid Cymru	John Edwin Lewis	597		
Labour hold		Swing		
Labour hold		Swing		
Independent hold		Swing		

=== Cwmllynfell (one seat) ===
Cwmllynfell 1983
Party	Candidate	Votes	%	±%
Labour	Elwyn Williams*	Unopposed		
Labour hold				

=== Cynwyl Gaeo and Llanwrda (one seat) ===
Cynwyl Gaeo and Llanwrda 1983
Party	Candidate	Votes	%	±%
Independent	Cyril Lewis Lloyd*	Unopposed		
Independent hold				

=== Glynamman (one seat) ===
Glynamman 1983
Party	Candidate	Votes	%	±%
Independent	Arthur Stanley Jones*	470		
Labour	G. Rees	251		
Majority				
Independent hold		Swing		

=== Llandeilo Fawr North Ward (one seat) ===
Llandeilo Fawr North Ward 1983
Party	Candidate	Votes	%	±%
Independent	J. Davies*	Unopposed		
Independent hold				

=== Llandeilo Fawr South Ward (one seat) ===
Llandeilo Fawr South Ward 1983
Party	Candidate	Votes	%	±%
Independent	H.G. Jones	249		
Independent	W.R. Price*	244		
Majority		5		
Independent hold		Swing		

=== Llandeilo Town (two seats) ===
Llandeilo Town 1983
Party	Candidate	Votes	%	±%
Independent	D.R. Williams*	555		
Independent	I.G. Jones	485		
Independent	L.A. German*	465		
Independent hold		Swing		
Independent hold		Swing		

=== Llanddeusant / Myddfai (one seat) ===
Llanddeusant / Myddfai 1983
Party	Candidate	Votes	%	±%
Independent	F.R. Jones*	Unopposed		
Independent hold				

=== Llandovery Town (two seats) ===
Llandovery Town 1983
Party	Candidate	Votes	%	±%
Plaid Cymru	Denley Owen	527		
Independent	D.J.K. Whiskerd	449		
Independent	W.D. Clarke	396		
Independent	W. Perry*	326		
Independent	J.M. Smith	231		
Independent	D.H. Evans*	230		
Plaid Cymru gain from Independent		Swing		
Independent hold		Swing		

=== Llandybie and Heolddu (three seats) ===
Llandybie and Heolddu 1983
Party	Candidate	Votes	%	±%
Independent	Mary Helena Thomas*	1,373		
Labour	I. Morgan*	1,318		
Labour	Herbert Brynmor Lewis Samways*	1,027		
Plaid Cymru	S.A.N. Price	906		
Independent hold		Swing		
Labour hold		Swing		
Labour hold		Swing		

=== Llanegwad and Llanfynydd (one seat) ===
Llanegwad and Llanfynydd 1983
Party	Candidate	Votes	%	±%
Independent	R.P. Morgan*	Unopposed		
Independent hold				

=== Llanfihangel Aberbythych and Llangathen (one seat) ===
Llanfihangel Aberbythych and Llangathen 1983
Party	Candidate	Votes	%	±%
Independent	D.A. Jones*	553		
Independent	David Martin Cray	231		
Majority		322		
Independent hold		Swing		

=== Llangadog and Llansadwrn (one seat) ===
Llangadog and Llansadwrn 1983
Party	Candidate	Votes	%	±%
Independent	G.T. Davies	460		
Plaid Cymru	Dafydd Prys Evans*	397		
Majority		63		
Independent gain from Plaid Cymru		Swing		

=== Llansawel and Talley (one seat) ===
Llansawel and Talley 1983
Party	Candidate	Votes	%	±%
Independent	John Gwilym Evans*	Unopposed		
Independent hold				

=== Penygroes (two seats) ===
Penygroes 1983
Party	Candidate	Votes	%	±%
Plaid Cymru	Lynne Davies*	616		
Plaid Cymru	A.R.H. Lewis	520		
Labour	E.B. Davies*	449		
Labour	I. John	301		
Plaid Cymru hold		Swing		
Plaid Cymru gain from Labour		Swing		

=== Saron (two seats) ===
Saron 1983
Party	Candidate	Votes	%	±%
Labour	I.M. Thomas	718		
Labour	D. Davies*	711		
Plaid Cymru	J.G. James	565		
Labour hold		Swing		
Labour hold		Swing		
