= 1991 Dinefwr Borough Council election =

Election to Dinefwr Borough Council

An election to Dinefwr Borough Council was held in May 1991. It was preceded by the 1987 election and followed, after local government reorganization, by the first election to Carmarthenshire County Council in 1995. On the same day there were elections to the other district local authorities and community councils in Wales.

== Results by ward ==
=== Betws (one seat) ===
Betws 1991
Party	Candidate	Votes	%	±%
Labour	David Arnallt James*	unopposed		
Labour hold		Swing		

=== Brynamman (one seat) ===
Brynamman 1991
Party	Candidate	Votes	%	±%
Labour	Vivien Rees*	542		
Independent	Ronald Frederick Mannall	54		
Labour hold		Swing		

=== Cilycwm (one seat) ===
Cilycwm 1991
Party	Candidate	Votes	%	±%
Independent	Thomas Theophilus*	unopposed		
Independent hold		Swing		

=== Cwmllynfell (one seat) ===
Cwmllynfell 1991
Party	Candidate	Votes	%	±%
Labour	Elwyn Williams*	unopposed		
Labour hold		Swing		

=== Cynwyl Gaeo (one seat) ===
Cynwyl Gaeo 1991
Party	Candidate	Votes	%	±%
Independent	Cyril Lewis Lloyd*	unopposed		
Independent hold		Swing		

=== Dyffryn Cennen (one seat) ===
Dyffryn Cennen 1987
Party	Candidate	Votes	%	±%
Independent	Hal Glenville Jones*	unopposed		
Independent hold		Swing		

=== Garnant (two seats) ===
Garnant 1991
Party	Candidate	Votes	%	±%
Labour	Kevin Madge*	713		
Labour	William Richard Murphy*	593		
Plaid Cymru	David John Lloyd Davies	375		
Labour hold		Swing		
Labour hold		Swing		

=== Glanamman (two seats) ===
Glanamman 1991
Party	Candidate	Votes	%	±%
Labour	David Ronald Harris*	648		
Plaid Cymru	John Edwin Lewis	606		
Labour	Howard James Power	437		
Labour hold		Swing		
Plaid Cymru gain from Labour		Swing		

=== Iscennen (one seat) ===
Iscennen 1991
Party	Candidate	Votes	%	±%
Independent	Llynfa Meinir Melba Thomas	331		
Labour	Ronald Amman Davies*	303		
Majority		28		
Independent gain from Labour		Swing		

=== Llandeilo Castle (one seat) ===
Boundary Change

Llandeilo Castle 1987
Party	Candidate	Votes	%	±%
Independent	Ieuan Goronwy Jones	unopposed		
Independent hold		Swing		

=== Llandeilo Tywi (one seat) ===
Llandeilo Tywi 1987
Party	Candidate	Votes	%	±%
Independent	Gareth Michael Davies	253		
Independent	John Lynch	233		
Independent hold		Swing		

=== Llandovery Town (two seats) ===
Llandovery Town 1991
Party	Candidate	Votes	%	±%
Plaid Cymru	Denley Owen*	unopposed		
	no nomination			
Plaid Cymru hold		Swing		
Independent hold		Swing		

=== Llandybie (three seats) ===
Llandybie 1991
Party	Candidate	Votes	%	±%
Independent	Mary Helena Thomas*	1,311		
Labour	Brenda Vivien Evans*	1,018		
Labour	Herbert Brynmor Lewis Samways*	990		
Plaid Cymru	Sarah Ann Nesta Price	966		
Independent hold		Swing		
Labour hold		Swing		
Labour hold		Swing		

=== Llanegwad and Llanfynydd (one seat) ===
Llanegwad and Llanfynydd 1991
Party	Candidate	Votes	%	±%
Independent	Dillwyn Anthony Williams	810		
Green	Brig Oubridge	134		
Majority				
Independent hold		Swing		

=== Llangadog and Llansadwrn (one seat) ===
Llangadog and Llansadwrn 1991
Party	Candidate	Votes	%	±%
Independent	Thomas Meirion Thomas	560		
Independent	Glyndwr Thomas Davies*	396		
Independent hold		Swing		

=== Llanfihangel Aberbythych (one seat) ===
Llanfihangel Aberbythych 1991
Party	Candidate	Votes	%	±%
Independent	David Arthur Jones*	unopposed		
Independent hold		Swing		

=== Llansawel (one seat) ===
Llansawel 1991
Party	Candidate	Votes	%	±%
Independent	John Gwilym Evans*	unopposed		
Independent hold		Swing		

=== Manordeilo and Salem (one seat) ===
Manordeilo and Salem 1991
Party	Candidate	Votes	%	±%
Independent	James Davies*	unopposed		
Independent hold		Swing		

=== Myddfai (one seat) ===
The ward was previously known as Llanddeusant and Myddfai

Myddfai 1991
Party	Candidate	Votes	%	±%
Independent	Francis Roland Jones*	unopposed		
Independent hold		Swing		

=== Pantyffynnon (one seat) ===
Pantyffynnon 1991
Party	Candidate	Votes	%	±%
Labour	Benjamin James Brinley Williams*	437		
Value for Money	David Howard Cooke	176		
Labour hold		Swing		

=== Penygroes (two seats) ===
Penygroes 1991
Party	Candidate	Votes	%	±%
Plaid Cymru	Lynne Davies*	unopposed		
Labour	Evan Bertie Davies*	unopposed		
Plaid Cymru hold		Swing		
Labour hold		Swing		

=== Pontamman (one seat) ===
Boundary Change

Pontamman 1991
Party	Candidate	Votes	%	±%
Labour	Kenneth Alvan Rees*	349		
Independent	David John Brian Thomas	177		
Labour win (new seat)				

=== Quarter Bach (one seat) ===
Quarter Bach 1987
Party	Candidate	Votes	%	±%
Independent	Arthur Stanley Jones*	386		
Labour	John Ronald Griffin	190		
Majority				
Independent hold		Swing		

=== Saron (two seats) ===
Saron 1991
Party	Candidate	Votes	%	±%
Labour	Terrence Hopkin Marshall*	unopposed		
Labour	Iorwerth Myrddin Thomas*	unopposed		
Labour hold		Swing		
Labour hold		Swing		

=== Tirydail (one seat) ===
Tirydail 1991
Party	Candidate	Votes	%	±%
Labour	Jeffrey Panes*	298		
Accountability Party	James Richards	249		
Labour hold		Swing		
