= 2004 Carmarthenshire County Council election =

Welsh local election

Results of the 2004 Carmarthenshire County Council election

The third election to Carmarthenshire County Council in Wales was held in May 2004. It was preceded by the 1999 election and followed by the 2008 election. As in previous elections, the Independent councillors had the largest number of seats. This resulted in a coalition between Independent and Labour Councillors for the next four years.

== Overview ==
Carmarthenshire County Council election result 2004
Party	Seats	Gains	Losses	Net gain/loss	Seats %	Votes %	Votes	+/−
Labour	25	3	5	-2	32.4	28.4	17,347	
Plaid Cymru	16	6	6	0	23.0	31.3	19,263	
Conservative	1	1	0	+1	1.3	2.1	1,276	
Liberal Democrats	0	0	1	-1	0.0	1.9	1,179	
Independent	32	8	4	+4	43.2	36.2	22,304	
Independent Labour	0	0	2	-1	0.0	0.0	0	0
Ratepayers	0	0	1	-1	0.0	0.0	0	0

== Results by ward ==
=== Abergwili (one seat) ===
Abergwili 2004
Party	Candidate	Votes	%	±%
Independent	Pamela Ann Palmer*	677	61.4	+61.4
Plaid Cymru	Henry Jones-Davies	246	22.3	+22.3
Labour	Frances Elizabeth Owens	179	16.2	+16.2
Majority		431	39.1	
Independent hold		Swing		

=== Ammanford (one seat) ===
Ammanford
Party	Candidate	Votes	%	±%
Labour	Michael Hugh Evans*	636		
Plaid Cymru	David Thomas	337		
Majority		299		
Labour hold		Swing		

=== Betws (one seat) ===
Betws
Party	Candidate	Votes	%	±%
Labour	John Dorian Evans*	329		
Plaid Cymru	Charlotte Price	299		
Majority		30		
Labour hold		Swing		

=== Bigyn (two seats) ===
Bigyn
Party	Candidate	Votes	%	±%
Labour	Sandra Melita Cooke*	728		
Labour	David Charles Prothero*	631		
Plaid Cymru	Michael Burns	495		
Independent	Brian Davies	410		
Independent	Lawrence Jenkins	351		
Labour hold		Swing		
Labour hold		Swing		

=== Burry Port (two seats) ===
Burry Port
Party	Candidate	Votes	%	±%
Labour	Patricia Ethel Mary Jones*	850		
Independent	Stephen Randall James	754		
Labour	Hugh Shepardson	710		
Plaid Cymru	Joanna Davies	301		
Plaid Cymru	Alexander Anderson	226		
Labour hold		Swing		
Independent gain from Labour		Swing		

=== Bynea (one seat) ===
Bynea
Party	Candidate	Votes	%	±%
Independent	Gwynne Harris Woolridge	544		
Labour	Muriel Jones	329		
Majority		215		
Independent gain from Labour		Swing		

=== Carmarthen Town North (two seats) ===
Carmarthen Town North
Party	Candidate	Votes	%	±%
Plaid Cymru	Peter Hughes Griffiths	767		
Plaid Cymru	Jeffrey Thomas	584		
Labour	Michael Stewart Elias	562		
Labour	Richard Evans	491		
Independent	Jeremy John	360		
Independent	Kevin Davies	214		
Plaid Cymru gain from Labour		Swing		
Plaid Cymru gain from Independent		Swing		

=== Carmarthen Town South (two seats) ===
Carmarthen Town South
Party	Candidate	Votes	%	±%
Independent	June Williams*	443		
Labour	Philip William Grice	551		
Plaid Cymru	David Jonathan Edwards	309		
Independent	Rob James	301		
Independent	Jennifer Fox	289		
Plaid Cymru	Jonathan Mendus Edwards	245		
Independent hold		Swing		
Labour gain from Independent Labour		Swing		

=== Carmarthen Town West (two seats) ===
Carmarthen Town West
Party	Candidate	Votes	%	±%
Independent	Arthur Davies*	700		
Plaid Cymru	Alan Douglas Thomas Speake	647		
Labour	Nia Rhiannon Griffith	362		
Plaid Cymru	Andrew John Dixon	321		
Independent	David Howell Merriman*	292		
Independent	Phillip Griffiths	219		
Independent hold		Swing		
Plaid Cymru gain from Independent		Swing		

=== Cenarth (one seat) ===
The sitting Plaid Cymru councillor, John Crossley, chose to contest Llangeler and the party did not field a candidate, leading to the loss of the seat to the Independents.

Cenarth
Party	Candidate	Votes	%	±%
Independent	William Haydn Jones	368		
Independent	Thomas Hesford	350		
Independent	Peter Lewis	155		
Labour	Michael Barron	155		
Majority		18		
Independent gain from Plaid Cymru		Swing		

=== Cilycwm (one seat) ===
Cilycwm
Party	Candidate	Votes	%	±%
Independent	Thomas Theophilus*	unopposed		
Independent hold		Swing		

=== Cynwyl Elfed (one seat) ===
Cynwyl Elfed
Party	Candidate	Votes	%	±%
Independent	William Dorrien Thomas*	unopposed		
Independent hold		Swing		

=== Cynwyl Gaeo (one seat) ===
Cynwyl Gaeo
Party	Candidate	Votes	%	±%
Plaid Cymru	James Eirwyn Williams*	560		
Conservative	Henry Lloyd Davies	155		
Majority		405		
Plaid Cymru hold		Swing		

=== Dafen (one seat) ===
Tegwen Devichand was elected at a by-election following the death of the previous councillor, Vernon Warlow.

Dafen 2004
Party	Candidate	Votes	%	±%
Labour	Tegwen Devichand*	546		
Plaid Cymru	Alford Clement Thomas	306		
Majority		240		
Labour hold		Swing		

=== Elli (one seat) ===
Elli
Party	Candidate	Votes	%	±%
Conservative	John Paul Jenkins	369		
Liberal Democrats	Pamela Jean Edmunds*	349		
Labour	Warren Cooke	288		
Majority		20		
Conservative gain from Liberal Democrats		Swing		

=== Felinfoel (one seat) ===
Felinfoel
Party	Candidate	Votes	%	±%
Independent	David William Hugh Richards	312		
Labour	Henry John Evans*	281		
Majority		31		
Independent gain from Labour		Swing		

=== Garnant (one seat) ===
Garnant
Party	Candidate	Votes	%	±%
Labour	Kevin Madge*	567		
Independent	Netta Thomas	110		
Plaid Cymru	Emyr Williams	100		
Labour hold		Swing		

=== Glanaman (one seat) ===
Glanaman
Party	Candidate	Votes	%	±%
Labour	David Colin Evans*	529		
Plaid Cymru	David Jenkins	353		
Labour hold		Swing		

=== Glanymor (two seats) ===
Glanymor
Party	Candidate	Votes	%	±%
Labour	Gerald Frederick Meyler*	623		
Labour	David Allan Tucker*	556		
Plaid Cymru	Keith Skivington	472		
Independent	Anthony Davies	346		
Labour hold		Swing		
Labour hold		Swing		

=== Glyn (one seat) ===
Glyn
Party	Candidate	Votes	%	±%
Independent	Thomas James Jones*	685		
Labour	Ellana Thomas	153		
Majority		532		
Independent hold		Swing		

=== Gorslas (two seats) ===
Gorslas
Party	Candidate	Votes	%	±%
Independent	Henry Clive Scourfield*	909		
Labour	Terry Davies	853		
Plaid Cymru	Thomas Rees	670		
Plaid Cymru	Andrew Hyde	320		
Independent hold		Swing		
Labour hold		Swing		

=== Hendy (one seat) ===
William James crossed the floor from Independents in the previous term.

Hendy
Party	Candidate	Votes	%	±%
Plaid Cymru	William Ieuan Bryant James	598		
Labour	Alun John Richards	323		
Majority		275		
Plaid Cymru hold		Swing		

=== Hengoed (two seats) ===
Hengoed
Party	Candidate	Votes	%	±%
Labour	Eryl Morgan	471		
Labour	Keith Thomas Davies	432		
Plaid Cymru	Michael Evans	398		
Plaid Cymru	Meilyr Bowen Hughes*	359		
Independent	Gordon Anderson	271		
Conservative	Fay Bowen	157		
Conservative	Dorothy McDonald	127		
Labour hold		Swing		
Labour gain from Plaid Cymru		Swing		

=== Kidwelly (one seat) ===
Although the sitting councillor, a former Labour member of Llanelli Borough Council, was elected as an Independent Labour candidate in 1995, he subsequently joined the Independent group.

Kidwelly
Party	Candidate	Votes	%	±%
Independent	Gwilym Glanmor Jones*	664		
Independent	Michael Higgins	440		
Labour	Michael Rayner	144		
Majority		224		
Independent hold		Swing		

=== Laugharne Township (one seat) ===
Laugharne Township
Party	Candidate	Votes	%	±%
Independent	Jane Tremlett	489		
Labour	Jack Done	401		
Independent	William Edmund Vincent John Davies	279		
Independent	Bob Costley	177		
Majority		88		
Independent hold		Swing		

=== Llanboidy (one seat) ===
Llanboidy
Party	Candidate	Votes	%	±%
Plaid Cymru	Daniel James Roy Llewellyn	492		
Independent	Gareth Lee	411		
Majority		81		
Plaid Cymru gain from Independent		Swing		

=== Llanddarog (one seat) ===
The elected candidate, who had sat as a Ratepayer for Gorslas since 1995, and on Dyfed County Council since 1977, had now joined the Independent group.

Llanddarog
Party	Candidate	Votes	%	±%
Independent	William John Wyn Evans*	unopposed		
Independent hold		Swing		

=== Llandeilo (one seat) ===
Llandeilo
Party	Candidate	Votes	%	±%
Independent	Ieuan Goronwy Jones*	unopposed		
Independent hold		Swing		

=== Llandovery Town (one seat) ===
Llandovery Town 2004
Party	Candidate	Votes	%	±%
Independent	Ivor John Jackson	659		
Plaid Cymru	John Dyer	478		
Labour	Branwen Llewelyn Jones	88		
Majority				
Independent gain from Plaid Cymru		Swing		

=== Llandybie (two seats) ===
Anthony Wyn Jones was elected at a by-election following the death of the previous Independent councillor, Gerald Earl.

Llandybie
Party	Candidate	Votes	%	±%
Independent	Mary Helena Thomas*	881		
Labour	Anthony Wyn Jones*	747		
Plaid Cymru	Nesta Urquhart	584		
Plaid Cymru	Meirion Bowen	516		
Independent hold		Swing		
Labour hold		Swing		

=== Llanegwad (one seat) ===
Llanegwad and Llanfynydd
Party	Candidate	Votes	%	±%
Independent	Dillwyn Anthony Williams*	864		
Liberal Democrats	Alleyne Caroline Farrington Evans	238		
Majority				
Independent hold		Swing		

=== Llanfihangel Aberbythych (one seat) ===
Llanfihangel Aberbythych
Party	Candidate	Votes	%	±%
Plaid Cymru	Dafydd Rhys Davies	389		
Independent	Winston Kenneth Griffiths*	302		
Conservative	Tony Jukes	83		
Majority		87		
Plaid Cymru gain from Independent		Swing		

=== Llanfihangel-ar-Arth (one seat) ===
Llanfihangel-ar-Arth
Party	Candidate	Votes	%	±%
Plaid Cymru	Fioled Meirion Jones*	870		
Conservative	Douglas Mearns Spragg	214		
Majority		656		
Plaid Cymru hold		Swing		

=== Llangadog (one seat) ===
No Boundary Change. Ward name changed.

Llangadog
Party	Candidate	Votes	%	±%
Independent	David Morgan	421		
Independent	Havard Jones	300		
Plaid Cymru	Rhobert ap Steffan	260		
Labour	Robert Holmes	44		
Majority		121		
Independent hold		Swing		

=== Llangeler (one seat) ===
The elected candidate was the sitting councillor for Cenarth since 1999.

Llangeler
Party	Candidate	Votes	%	±%
Plaid Cymru	John David George Crossley*	901		
Independent	Caroline Roberts	438		
Majority				
Plaid Cymru gain from Independent		Swing		

=== Llangennech (two seats) ===
Llangenench
Party	Candidate	Votes	%	±%
Plaid Cymru	Gwyneth Thomas*	712		
Plaid Cymru	William Gwyn Hopkins*	672		
Labour	Raymond Cooke	601		
Independent	Cerith David Thomas	481		
Socialist Labour	John Willock	180		
Plaid Cymru hold		Swing		
Plaid Cymru hold		Swing		

=== Llangunnor (one seat) ===
Llangunnor
Party	Candidate	Votes	%	±%
Independent	Clifford Merlin Jones*	686		
Plaid Cymru	Dewi Elwyn Williams	362		
Majority		324		
Independent hold		Swing		

=== Llangyndeyrn (one seat) ===
Llangyndeyrn
Party	Candidate	Votes	%	±%
Plaid Cymru	William Tyssul Evans	872		
Labour	John Roberts	184		
Majority				
Plaid Cymru hold		Swing		

=== Llannon (two seats) ===
Llannon
Party	Candidate	Votes	%	±%
Plaid Cymru	Neil William Baker*	1,140		
Independent	Alun Owens	630		
Labour	Terrence Maxwell Evans	586		
Plaid Cymru	Philip Williams	530		
Labour	Megan Squires	412		
Plaid Cymru hold		Swing		
Independent hold		Swing		

=== Llansteffan (one seat) ===
Osi Rhys Osmond had been elected at a by-election following the death of the previous Independent councillor, Arthur Harries.

Llansteffan
Party	Candidate	Votes	%	±%
Independent	Daff Davies	614		
Plaid Cymru	Osi Rhys Osmond	516		
Majority		98		
Independent gain from Plaid Cymru		Swing		

=== Llanybydder (one seat) ===
Llanybydder
Party	Candidate	Votes	%	±%
Independent	Ieuan Wyn Davies*	unopposed		
Independent hold		Swing		

=== Lliedi (two seats) ===
Lliedi
Party	Candidate	Votes	%	±%
Labour	William George Thomas*	737		
Labour	William Edward Skinner*	731		
Liberal Democrats	Kenneth Denver Rees	592		
Liberal Democrats	Hugh Morgan Lewis	550		
Labour hold		Swing		
Labour hold		Swing		

=== Llwynhendy (two seats) ===
Dillwyn Bowen was the Labour councillor for Bynea from 1995 until de-selected by the Labour Party prior to the 2004 election. He then chose to contest Llwynhendy alongside sitting Independent councillor Don Davies, who had himself been de-selected by Labour prior to the 1999 election.

Llwynhendy
Party	Candidate	Votes	%	±%
Independent	Thomas Dillwyn Bowen*	501		
Independent	Donald John Davies*	500		
Labour	Diana Darby	430		
Labour	Benjamin C.M. Reynolds	386		
Independent gain from Labour		Swing		
Independent hold		Swing		

=== Manordeilo and Salem (one seat) ===
Manordeilo and Salem
Party	Candidate	Votes	%	±%
Independent	John James Jones Davies*	655		
Plaid Cymru	Andre Jacob	181		
Conservative	Martin Davies	132		
Majority				
Independent hold		Swing		

=== Pembrey (two seats) ===
Pembrey
Party	Candidate	Votes	%	±%
Labour	Vincent John Rees*	526		
Labour	John Clive Howells*	488		
Independent	Trevor Uriel Jones Thomas	463		
Plaid Cymru	Sian Caiach	423		
Plaid Cymru	Martin Davies	314		
Labour hold		Swing		
Labour hold		Swing		

=== Penygroes (one seat) ===
Penygroes
Party	Candidate	Votes	%	±%
Plaid Cymru	Siân Elisabeth Thomas*	552		
Labour	Mark Lewis	414		
Majority		138		
Plaid Cymru hold		Swing		

=== Pontamman (one seat) ===
Pontamman
Party	Candidate	Votes	%	±%
Labour	Vivian Lynne Llewellyn	461		
Plaid Cymru	John Binney	355		
Majority		106		
Labour hold		Swing		

=== Pontyberem (one seat) ===
Joy Williams captured the seat for Plaid Cymru at a by-election following the death of the previous Independent Labour councillor, Ieuan Edwards.

Pontyberem
Party	Candidate	Votes	%	±%
Plaid Cymru	Joy Williams*	918		
Labour	Ishtiaq Shiekh	135		
Majority				
Plaid Cymru hold		Swing		

=== Quarter Bach (one seat) ===
Quarter Bach
Party	Candidate	Votes	%	±%
Labour	Elwyn Williams*	655		
Plaid Cymru	Marion Binney	467		
Majority				
Labour hold		Swing		

=== St Clears (one seat) ===
St Clears
Party	Candidate	Votes	%	±%
Independent	Philip Hughes*	955		
Independent	Lyn Luke ap Trin Davies	265		
Majority		690		
Independent hold		Swing		

=== St Ishmaels (one seat) ===
St Ishmaels
Party	Candidate	Votes	%	±%
Independent	Lydia Mair Stephens	803		
Plaid Cymru	David Huw John*	414		
Independent gain from Plaid Cymru		Swing		

=== Saron (two seats) ===
Saron
Party	Candidate	Votes	%	±%
Plaid Cymru	John Garfield Edwards*	786		
Labour	Alan Peter Cooper	754		
Plaid Cymru	Nigel Henry Evans*	682		
Labour	Betty Phillips	621		
Plaid Cymru hold		Swing		
Labour gain from Plaid Cymru		Swing		

=== Swiss Valley (one seat) ===
Swiss Valley
Party	Candidate	Votes	%	±%
Independent	Anthony Giles Morgan	492		
Independent	Frederick James	210		
Labour	Carol Edwards	181		
Majority		282		
Independent gain from Labour		Swing		

=== Trelech (one seat) ===
Trelech
Party	Candidate	Votes	%	±%
Independent	William David Thomas*	unopposed		
Independent hold		Swing		

=== Trimsaran (one seat) ===
Party	Candidate	Votes	%	±%
Independent	Meryl Gravell*	604		
Labour	Geraint Hopkins	113		
Plaid Cymru	Dilwyn Jones	96		
Majority		491		
Independent hold		Swing		

=== Tycroes (one seat) ===
Tycroes
Party	Candidate	Votes	%	±%
Labour	David Thomas Enoch*	513		
Plaid Cymru	Emyr Brown	275		
Majority		238		
Labour hold		Swing		

=== Tyisha (two seats) ===
Tyisha
Party	Candidate	Votes	%	±%
Labour	Keri Peter Thomas	622		
Labour	Martin Philip Morris*	621		
Plaid Cymru	Dyfrig Thomas	362		
Plaid Cymru	Martin Davies	354		
Conservative	Betty Chambers	166		
Labour hold		Swing		
Labour hold		Swing		

=== Whitland (one seat) ===
Whitland
Party	Candidate	Votes	%	±%
Independent	James Morris Morgan*	447		
Independent	William Conwil Harries	271		
Majority				
Independent hold		Swing		
