= 1995 Carmarthenshire County Council election =

Welsh local election

The first elections to the Carmarthenshire County Council were held on 4 May 1995. It was followed by the 1999 election. Results are drawn from the national and local press.

== Overview ==
Carmarthenshire County Council election result 1995
Party	Seats	Gains	Losses	Net gain/loss	Seats %	Votes %	Votes	+/−
Labour								
Conservative	1							
Liberal Democrats								
Plaid Cymru								
Independent								
Independent Labour								
Ratepayers								
Green								
Other parties								

== Results by ward ==
=== Abergwili (one seat) ===
Abergwili 1995
Party	Candidate	Votes	%	±%
Independent	Pamela Palmer*	671	72.5	
Plaid Cymru	Frances Dixon	254	27.5	
Majority		417	45.0	
Independent hold		Swing		

=== Ammanford (one seat) ===
Ammanford
Party	Candidate	Votes	%	±%
Independent	Llynfa Thomas*	304	50.4	
Labour	Shireen Davies	299	49.6	
Majority		5	0.8	
Independent hold		Swing		

=== Betws (one seat) ===
Betws
Party	Candidate	Votes	%	±%
Labour	John Dorian Evans	442	65.2	
Plaid Cymru	Brian Vaughan	200	29.5	
Independent	William Thomas	36	5.3	
Majority		242	35.7	
Labour hold		Swing		

=== Bigyn (three seats) ===
Bigyn
Party	Candidate	Votes	%	±%
Labour	Martin Morris	1,090	22.6	
Labour	Sandra Cooke	924	19.2	
Labour	David Prothero	902	18.7	
Independent	William J Marks*	693	14.4	
Liberal Democrats	Margaret N Burree*	676	14	
Independent	Richard John*	531	11	
Labour gain from Independent		Swing		
Labour gain from Liberal Democrats		Swing		
Labour gain from Independent		Swing		

=== Burry Port (two seats) ===
Burry Port
Party	Candidate	Votes	%	±%
Liberal Democrats	Keith Evans*	1,014	34.2	
Liberal Democrats	George W. West*	693	23.4	
Plaid Cymru	David Nolan	501	16.9	
Labour	Lawrence Jenkins	397	13.4	
Labour	Paul Davies	356	12	
Liberal Democrats win (new seat)				
Liberal Democrats win (new seat)				

=== Bynea (one seat) ===
Bynea
Party	Candidate	Votes	%	±%
Labour	Thomas Bowen*	533	71.4	
Independent Green	Marcus Hughes*	320	28.6	
Majority		213	42.8	
Labour gain from Independent Green		Swing		

=== Carmarthen Town North (two seats) ===
Carmarthen Town North
Party	Candidate	Votes	%	±%
Labour	Kenneth Maynard	1,431	38.9	
Independent	David Merriman*	1,117	30.4	
Labour	Douglas Rose	849	23.1	
Conservative	Jane Jones	279	7.6	
Labour win (new seat)				
Independent win (new seat)				

=== Carmarthen Town South (two seats) ===
Carmarthen Town South
Party	Candidate	Votes	%	±%
Liberal Democrats	Margaret Evans*	982	39.7	
Labour	Russell Davies*	808	32.7	
Independent	Richard Goodridge	682	27.6	
Liberal Democrats hold		Swing		
Labour gain from Independent		Swing		

=== Carmarthen Town West (two seats) ===
Carmarthen Town West
Party	Candidate	Votes	%	±%
Labour	Sioned-Mair Richards*	694	24.5	
Independent	William Gwynoro Jones*	611	21.5	
Labour	Judy Stenger*	564	19.9	
Plaid Cymru	Dewi Williams	471	16.6	
Independent	Agnes Dunbar	295	10.4	
Liberal Democrats	Dominic Alessio	136	4.8	
Green	Brian Kingzett	67	2.4	
Labour win (new seat)				
Independent win (new seat)				

=== Cenarth (one seat) ===
Cenarth
Party	Candidate	Votes	%	±%
Independent	Alan Wyndham Jones	Unopposed		
Independent hold		Swing		

=== Clynderwen (one seat) ===
Clynderwen
Party	Candidate	Votes	%	±%
Independent	James Morgan*	unopposed		
Independent hold		Swing		

=== Cross Hands (one seat) ===
Cross Hands
Party	Candidate	Votes	%	±%
Independent Labour	Philip Davies*	383	63.4	
Labour	George Davies	221	36.6	
Majority		162	26.8	
Independent Labour gain from Labour		Swing		

=== Cynwyl Elfed (one seat) ===
Cynwyl Elfed
Party	Candidate	Votes	%	±%
Independent	William Thomas*	unopposed		
Independent hold		Swing		

=== Cynwyl Gaeo and Llanwrda /Talley (one seat) ===
Cynwyl Gaeo and Llanwrda/Talley
Party	Candidate	Votes	%	±%
Independent	Thomas Theophilus*	782	69.3	
Independent	W.G. Rees	137	12.1	
Liberal Democrats	J.P. Doubell	105	9.3	
Green	Tim Shaw	105	9.3	
Majority		645	57.2	
Independent win (new seat)				

=== Dafen (one seat) ===
Dafen 1995
Party	Candidate	Votes	%	±%
Labour	Vernon Warlow	477	52.7	
Independent Green	Brian Stringer*	428	47.3	
Majority		49	5.4	
Labour win (new seat)				

=== Elli (one seat) ===
Elli
Party	Candidate	Votes	%	±%
Labour	Stephen James*	585	49.7	
Conservative	Robert Buckland	380	32.3	
Liberal Democrats	Nicholas C. Burree	211	18.0	
Majority		205	17.4	
Labour win (new seat)				

=== Felinfoel (one seat) ===
Felinfoel
Party	Candidate	Votes	%	±%
Labour	Henry Evans*	unopposed		
Labour hold		Swing		

=== Garnant (one seat) ===
Garnant
Party	Candidate	Votes	%	±%
Labour	Kevin Madge*	668	83.7	
Plaid Cymru	Emyr Williams	130	16.3	
Majority		538	67.4	
Labour win (new seat)				

=== Glanaman (one seat) ===
Glanaman
Party	Candidate	Votes	%	±%
Labour	David Harris*	753	80.4	
Plaid Cymru	David Davies	184	19.6	
Majority		569	60.8	
Labour win (new seat)				

=== Glanymor (two seats) ===
Glanymor
Party	Candidate	Votes	%	±%
Labour	David James*	1,126	38.0	
Labour	Gerald Meyler	853	28.8	
Independent Labour	Kenneth Davies*	665	22.4	
Independent	Matilda Jones snr.	171	5.8	
Independent	Alison Price	149	5.0	
Labour hold		Swing		
Labour hold		Swing		

=== Glyn (one seat) ===
Glyn
Party	Candidate	Votes	%	±%
Labour	Howard Jones	407	42.1	
Independent Labour	Thomas Jones	368	38.1	
Liberal Democrats	Dynfor Owens*	192	19.8	
Majority		39	4.0	
Labour gain from Liberal Democrats		Swing		

=== Gorslas (two seats) ===
Gorslas
Party	Candidate	Votes	%	±%
Labour	Ryan Jones*	1,257	39.0	
Ratepayer	William Wyn Evans	1,085	33.7	
Labour	M.E. Janes	737	22.9	
Conservative	D.W. Thomas	140	4.3	
Majority				
Labour hold		Swing		
Ratepayer hold		Swing		

=== Hendy (one seat) ===
Hendy
Party	Candidate	Votes	%	±%
Plaid Cymru	Henry Williams	625	53.1	
Labour	Austin R. Welsby	552	46.9	
Majority		73	6.2	
Plaid Cymru hold		Swing		

=== Hengoed (two seats) ===
Hengoed
Party	Candidate	Votes	%	±%
Labour	Peter Williams	657	27.8	
Labour	Kenneth Edwards	593	25.1	
Plaid Cymru	John Jones	578	24.5	
Independent	Denis Woolley*	376	15.9	
Liberal Democrats	Kirsty Williams	159	6.7	
Majority				
Labour hold		Swing		
Labour hold		Swing		

=== Kidwelly (one seat) ===
Kidwelly
Party	Candidate	Votes	%	±%
Independent Labour	Gwilym Jones*	864	58.1	
Labour	Hywel Rees	623	41.9	
Majority		241	16.2	
Independent Labour gain from Labour		Swing		

=== Laugharne Township (one seat) ===
Laugharne Township
Party	Candidate	Votes	%	±%
Independent	Cyril Roberts*	unopposed		
Independent hold		Swing		

=== Llanboidy (one seat) ===
Llanboidy
Party	Candidate	Votes	%	±%
Independent	John Gibbin*	unopposed		
Independent hold		Swing		

=== Llanddarog (one seat) ===
Llanddarog
Party	Candidate	Votes	%	±%
Ratepayer	Huw Williams*	unopposed		
Ratepayer hold		Swing		

=== Llanddowror (one seat) ===
Llanddowror
Party	Candidate	Votes	%	±%
Conservative	William Davies	unopposed		
Conservative gain from Independent		Swing		

=== Llandeilo, Tywi and Castle (one seat) ===
Llandeilo, Tywi and Castle
Party	Candidate	Votes	%	±%
Independent	David Davies	417	53.5	
Labour	Ieuan Gwyn	222	28.5	
Plaid Cymru	M.L. Bowen	74	9.5	
Liberal Democrats	S.K. Doubell	67	8.6	
Majority		195	25.0	
Independent hold		Swing		

=== Llandovery Town (one seat) ===
Llandovery Town
Party	Candidate	Votes	%	±%
Plaid Cymru	Denley Owen*	1,140	85.2	
Labour	Vivienne Smith	198	14.8	
Majority		942	70.4	
Plaid Cymru win (new seat)				

=== Llandybie and Heolddu (two seats) ===
Llandybie and Heolddu
Party	Candidate	Votes	%	±%
Independent	Gerald Earl	1,047	30.6	
Independent	Mary Thomas*	837	24.4	
Labour	Brenda Evans*	792	23.1	
Labour	Herbert Samways*	647	18.9	
Conservative	Henri Davies	102	3.0	
Independent win (new seat)				
Independent win (new seat)				

=== Llandyfaelog (one seat) ===
Llandyfaelog
Party	Candidate	Votes	%	±%
Plaid Cymru	David John	326	54.2	
Independent	Lydia Stephens	275	45.8	
Majority		51	8.4	
Plaid Cymru gain from Independent		Swing		

=== Llanegwad and Llanfynydd (one seat) ===
Llanegwad and Llanfynydd
Party	Candidate	Votes	%	±%
Independent	Dillwyn Williams*	558	59.8	
Independent	John James	375	40.2	
Majority		183	19.6	
Independent hold		Swing		

=== Llanfihangel Aberbythych (one seat) ===
Llanfihangel Aberbythych
Party	Candidate	Votes	%	±%
Independent	David Jones*	417	57.8	
Liberal Democrats	Roy C. Vivian	304	42.2	
Majority		113	15.6	
Independent hold		Swing		

=== Llanfihangel-ar-Arth (one seat) ===
Llanfihangel-ar-Arth
Party	Candidate	Votes	%	±%
Plaid Cymru	Fioled Jones	unopposed		
Plaid Cymru hold		Swing		

=== Llangeler (one seat) ===
Llangeler
Party	Candidate	Votes	%	±%
Independent	Thomas Davies*	unopposed		
Independent hold		Swing		

=== Llangennech (two seats) ===
Llangenench
Party	Candidate	Votes	%	±%
Plaid Cymru	William Hopkins	704	27.5	
Labour	Thomas Lewis	641	25.1	
Labour	John Willock	628	24.6	
Plaid Cymru	Meilyr Hughes	584	22.8	
Plaid Cymru gain from Independent		Swing		
Labour hold		Swing		

=== Llangunnor (one seat) ===
Llangunnor
Party	Candidate	Votes	%	±%
Independent	Merlin Jones*	728	57.7	
Independent	Robin Griffiths*	533	42.3	
Majority		195	15.4	
Independent hold		Swing		

=== Llangyndeyrn (one seat) ===
Llangyndeyrn
Party	Candidate	Votes	%	±%
Labour	Philip Evans	857	65.8	
Independent	Robert Beynon*	445	34.2	
Majority		412	31.6	
Labour win (new seat)				

=== Llansadwrn and Llangadog / Myddfai and Llanddeusant (one seat) ===
Llansadwrn and Llangadog / Myddfai and Llanddeusant
Party	Candidate	Votes	%	±%
Independent	Thomas Thomas*	Unopposed		
Independent hold		Swing		

=== Llansteffan (one seat) ===
Llansteffan
Party	Candidate	Votes	%	±%
Independent	John Harries	unopposed		
Independent hold		Swing		

=== Llanybydder/Llanllwni (one seat) ===
Llanybydder/Llanllwni
Party	Candidate	Votes	%	±%
Independent	Ieuan Wyn Davies	794	58.1	
Plaid Cymru	Timothy Davies	318	23.3	
Labour	Gaynor Davies	200	14.6	
Disability Rights	Patricia Stevens-Bevan	28	2	
Liberal Democrats	Alleyne Evans	26	1.9	
Majority		476	34.8	
Independent hold		Swing		

=== Lliedi (two seats) ===
Lliedi
Party	Candidate	Votes	%	±%
Labour	William Skinner	869	27.7	
Labour	William Thomas	824	26.3	
Liberal Democrats	Elinor Lloyd*	683	21.8	
Liberal Democrats	Kenneth Rees	549	17.5	
Conservative	David James	214	6.8	
Labour gain from Liberal Democrats		Swing		
Labour gain from Independent		Swing		

=== Llwynhendy (two seats) ===
Llwynhendy
Party	Candidate	Votes	%	±%
Labour	Donald Davies*	749	35.1	
Labour	Eunydd Thomas	692	32.4	
Independent	John Howell	534	25.0	
Liberal Democrats	Jonathan Burree	161	7.5	
Labour hold		Swing		
Labour hold		Swing		

=== Manordeilo and Salem / Ffairfach (one seat) ===
Manordeilo and Salem / Ffairfach
Party	Candidate	Votes	%	±%
Independent	John Davies*	674	56.6	
Independent	Hal Jones*	517	43.4	
Majority		157	13.2	
Independent hold		Swing		

=== Myddynfych (one seat) ===
Myddynfych
Party	Candidate	Votes	%	±%
Labour	D. Maldwyn R. Morgan*	335	76.8	
Independent Labour	David Thomas	101	23.2	
Majority		234	53.6	
Labour hold		Swing		

=== Newchurch (one seat) ===
Newchurch
Party	Candidate	Votes	%	±%
Independent	Henry Jones	unopposed		
Independent hold		Swing		

=== Pantyffynnon (one seat) ===
Pantyffynnon
Party	Candidate	Votes	%	±%
Labour	Michael Evans*	unopposed		
Labour hold		Swing		

=== Pembrey (two seats) ===
Pembrey
Party	Candidate	Votes	%	±%
Labour	Vincent Rees*	646	33.2	
Labour	Trevor Thomas*	599	30.8	
Plaid Cymru	David Williams	459	23.6	
Independent	Raymond Hall	239	12.3	
Labour win (new seat)				
Labour win (new seat)				

=== Pencarreg (one seat) ===
Pencarreg
Party	Candidate	Votes	%	±%
Independent	James Williams	383	63.6	
Labour	David Williams	219	36.4	
Majority		164	27.2	
Independent hold		Swing		

=== Penygroes (one seat) ===
Penygroes
Party	Candidate	Votes	%	±%
Plaid Cymru	Ceirwyn Davies	500	52.9	
Labour	Evan Davies*	446	47.1	
Majority		54	5.8	
Plaid Cymru win (new seat)				

=== Pontamman (one seat) ===
Pontamman
Party	Candidate	Votes	%	±%
Labour	Kenneth Rees*	unopposed		
Labour hold		Swing		

=== Pontyberem (one seat) ===
Pontyberem
Party	Candidate	Votes	%	±%
Independent Labour	Thomas Edwards	479	34	
Independent	Deris Williams	408	29	
Independent Ratepayer	James Annandale	269	19.1	
Labour	Wendy Evans	253	17.9	
Majority		71	5	
Independent Labour gain from Labour		Swing		

=== Quarter Bach / Llynfell / Brynamman (one seat) ===
Quarter Bach / Llynfell / Brynamman
Party	Candidate	Votes	%	±%
Labour	Elwyn Williams*	722	46.6	
Independent	Arthur Jones*	535	34.5	
Plaid Cymru	Kenneth J.G. Maddocks*	292	18.9	
Majority		187	12.1	
Labour win (new seat)				

=== St Clears (one seat) ===
St Clears
Party	Candidate	Votes	%	±%
Independent	Arwyn Owen*	876	52	
Independent	David Phillips*	809	48	
Majority		67	4	
Independent hold		Swing		

=== St Ishmaels (one seat) ===
St Ishmaels
Party	Candidate	Votes	%	±%
Independent	David Phillips*	unopposed		
Independent hold		Swing		

=== Saron (one seat) ===
Saron
Party	Candidate	Votes	%	±%
Labour	Terrence H. Marshall*	800	54.2	
Plaid Cymru	John Davies	677	45.8	
Majority		123	8.4	
Labour hold		Swing		

=== Swiss Valley (one seat) ===
Swiss Valley
Party	Candidate	Votes	%	±%
Independent	Patrick Caulfield	407	50.4	
Labour	Nigel Griffiths	400	49.6	
Majority		7	0.8	
		Swing		

=== Trelech (one seat) ===
Trelech
Party	Candidate	Votes	%	±%
Independent	William Thomas*	unopposed		
Independent hold		Swing		

=== Trimsaran (one seat) ===
Trimsaran
Party	Candidate	Votes	%	±%
Independent	Meryl Gravell	548	50.0	
Liberal Democrats	Thomas Cooper	332	30.3	
Labour	David Taylor	181	16.5	
Independent	Denis Carter	36	3.3	
Majority		216	19.7	
Independent hold		Swing		

=== Tumble (two seats) ===
Tumble
Party	Candidate	Votes	%	±%
Labour	Terrence Evans*	866	37.9	
Labour	David Richards*	752	33	
Plaid Cymru	Neil Baker	664	29.1	
Labour hold		Swing		
Labour hold		Swing		

=== Tycroes (one seat) ===
Tycroes
Party	Candidate	Votes	%	±%
Labour	Angus Pugh*	451	50.8	
Plaid Cymru	Hugh Waters	437	49.2	
Majority		14	1.6	
Labour hold		Swing		

=== Tyisha (two seats) ===
Tyisha
Party	Candidate	Votes	%	±%
Labour	David Neil*	1,040	38.0	
Labour	Harry Palmer*	958	35.0	
Plaid Cymru	Dyfrig Thomas	739	27.0	
Labour hold		Swing		
Labour hold		Swing		

=== Whitland (one seat) ===
Whitland
Party	Candidate	Votes	%	±%
Plaid Cymru	Roy Llewellyn	549	75.2	
Independent	Rosemary Jenkins	181	24.8	
Majority		368	50.4	
Plaid Cymru hold		Swing		

== By-elections between 1995 and 1999 ==
=== Penygroes 1996 ===
A by-election was held in the Penygroes ward following the death of Plaid Cymru councillor Ceirwyn Davies. Lynne Davies, who had previously represented the ward on Dinefwr Borough Council from 1976 until 1996 was elected in his place.

Penygroes by-election, 4 July 1996
Party	Candidate	Votes	%	±%
Plaid Cymru	Lynne Davies	643	58.2	
Labour	Evan Bertie Davies	387	35.0	
Liberal Democrats		75	6.8	
Majority				
Turnout				
Registered electors				
Plaid Cymru hold		Swing		

=== Carmarthen Town South 1997 ===
A by-election was held in the Carmarthen Town South ward following the death of Liberal Democrat councillor Dr Margaret Evans.

Carmarthen Town South by-election, 11 December 1997
Party	Candidate	Votes	%	±%
Independent	June Williams	295		
Labour	Richard Edwards	269		
Plaid Cymru	Mary Kathleen Davies	190		
Liberal Democrats	Caroline Evans	75		
Conservative	Jane Ann Jones	42		
Majority		26		
Turnout				
Registered electors				
Independent gain from Liberal Democrats		Swing		

=== Burry Port 1998 ===
A by-election was held in the Burry Port ward following the death of Liberal Democrat councillor George West.

Burry Port by-election, 30 July 1998
Party	Candidate	Votes	%	±%
Labour	Patricia Ethel Mary Jones	730		
Liberal Democrats		466		
Plaid Cymru		143		
Majority				
Turnout				
Registered electors				
Labour gain from Liberal Democrats		Swing		
