= Dafen (electoral ward) =

Electoral ward in Carmarthenshire, Wales

Dafen is an electoral ward, representing the immediate area around the village of Dafen in the community of Llanelli Rural, Carmarthenshire, Wales.

== Profile ==
In 2014, the Dafen electoral ward had an electorate of 2,665. The total population was 3,615, of whom 84.6% were born in Wales. 26.9% of the population were able to speak Welsh.

== Representation ==
Dafan is a ward to Llanelli Rural Council, electing four community councillors.

The Dafen Ward is a single-member ward for the purposes of Carmarthenshire County Council elections. From 2012 to 2017 it was represented by Labour Party councilor Tegwen Devichand. Since 2017 it has been represented by Cllr Rob Evans, originally elected as an independent but joined the Labour ranks in 2019.

== Recent history ==
The first election to the new unitary Carmarthenshire County Council took place in 1995. Dafen Ward was won by the Labour Party candidate, Vernon Warlow, who defeated a sitting member of Llanelli Borough Council.

Dafen 1995
Party	Candidate	Votes	%	±%
Labour	Vernon John Warlow	477		
Independent Green	Brian Stringer*	428		
Majority		49		
Labour win (new seat)				

At the 1999, Warlow was re-elected despite a strong showing by Plaid Cymru which won the Llanelli seat in the inaugural Welsh Assembly elections held on the same day.

Dafen 1999
Party	Candidate	Votes	%	±%
Labour	Vernon John Warlow*	568		
Plaid Cymru	Alford Clement Thomas	562		
Majority		6		
Labour hold		Swing		

Labour again held the seat in 2004. Tegwen Devichand was elected at a by-election following the death of the previous councillor, Vernon Warlow.

Dafen 2004
Party	Candidate	Votes	%	±%
Labour	Tegwen Devichand*	546		
Plaid Cymru	Alford Clement Thomas	306		
Majority		240		
Labour hold		Swing		

Labour again held the seat in 2008.

Dafen 2008
Party	Candidate	Votes	%	±%
Labour	Tegwen Devichand*	532		
Plaid Cymru	Mohammad Alam Choudry	402		
Majority		130		
Labour hold		Swing		

In 2012, Labour retained the seat. Labour won by a large majority although Plaid Cymru's vote may have been affected by the decision of their former candidate, Clem Thomas, to stand for People First.

Dafen 2012
Party	Candidate	Votes	%	±%
Labour	Tegwen Devichand*	513		
Plaid Cymru	Mohammad Alam Choudry	178		
People First	Clem Thomas	131		
Independent	Dai Hughes	90		
Majority		130		
Labour hold		Swing		

== Earlier History ==
=== County Council Elections ===
The long-standing ward boundaries in the Llanelli area were redrawn in the 1980s and Dafen ward was part of the Felinfoel ward for the purposes of election to Dyfed County Council in 1989 and 1993.

When the current Carmarthenshire County Council was formed in 1995, Dafen became a ward in its own.

=== District Council Elections ===
From 1987, Dafen formed an electoral ward for the purposes of elections to Llanelli Borough Council. Dafen returned two members.
