= Pen-y-groes (electoral ward) =

Electoral ward in Carmarthenshire, Wales

Pen-y-groes is an electoral ward within the Carmarthenshire County Council, representing the people of Penygroes, Carmarthenshire, Wales.

== Profile ==
In 2019, the Pen-y-groes electoral ward had an electorate of 2,361. As of 2021 the population was 2,917, of whom 2,311 were born in Wales. 62.2% of the population are able to speak Welsh.

== Current Representation ==
The Pen-y-groes Ward is a single-member ward, meaning only one representative is elected at each election. Since 2017 it has been represented by Plaid Cymru councillor Dai Thomas.

== Electoral history ==
The first election to the new unitary Carmarthenshire County Council took place in 1995. Ceirwyn Davies was elected with a majority of just 54 votes.

Penygroes 1995
Party	Candidate	Votes	%	±%
Plaid Cymru	Ceirwyn Davies	500	52.9	
Labour	Evan Davies*	446	47.1	
Majority		54	5.8	
Plaid Cymru win (new seat)				

Penygroes 1999
Party	Candidate	Votes	%	±%
Plaid Cymru	Siân Elisabeth Thomas	659	61.4	+8.5
Labour	Elizabeth Ann Phillips	414	38.6	−8.5
Majority		245	22.8	

Penygroes 2004
Party	Candidate	Votes	%	±%
Plaid Cymru	Siân Elisabeth Thomas*	552	57.1	−4.3
Labour	Mark Lewis	414	42.9	+4.3
Majority		138	14.2	
Plaid Cymru hold		Swing		

Penygroes 2008
Party	Candidate	Votes	%	±%
Plaid Cymru	Siân Elisabeth Thomas*	608	75.9	+18.8
BNP	Kevin Edwards	193	24.1	
Majority		415	51.8	

Penygroes 2012
Party	Candidate	Votes	%	±%
Plaid Cymru	Siân Elisabeth Thomas*	344	37.7	−38.2
Labour	Bob Gunstone	338	37	
Independent	Aled Rees	139	15.2	
Conservative	Susan Freda Webb	92	10.1	
Majority		6	0.7	

Penygroes 2017
Party	Candidate	Votes	%	±%
Plaid Cymru	Dai Thomas	582	58.8	+20.6
Labour	Paul Truman Blackwell	259	26.1	−10.9
UKIP	Timothy Dean	150	15.1	
Majority		323	32.7	

Penygroes 2022
Party	Candidate	Votes	%	±%
Plaid Cymru	Dai Thomas	453	45.9	−12.9
Labour	Rachael Williams	260	26.3	+0.2
Liberal Democrats	Julian William Tandy	188	19.0	
Breakthrough Party	Ewan Phillip Chappell	87	8.8	
Majority		193	19.6	
