= 1999 Carmarthenshire County Council election =

Welsh local election

The second elections to the Carmarthenshire County Council were held in May 1999. It was preceded by the 1995 election and followed by the 2004 election. They resulted in a coalition between Independent councillors and Plaid Cymru for the next five years.

== Overview ==
Carmarthenshire County Council election result 1999
Party	Seats	Gains	Losses	Net gain/loss	Seats %	Votes %	Votes	+/−
Labour	28				37.8			
Independent	26				35.1			
Plaid Cymru	13				17.5			
Independent Labour	4				5.4			
Ratepayers	2				2.7			
Liberal Democrats	1				1.3			
Conservative	0				0.0			

== Results by ward ==
=== Abergwili (one seat) ===
Abergwili 1999
Party	Candidate	Votes	%	±%
Independent	Pamela Ann Palmer*	unopposed		
Independent hold		Swing		

=== Ammanford (one seat) ===
Boundary Change. Two sitting members contested the seat.

Ammanford 1999
Party	Candidate	Votes	%	±%
Labour	Michael Hugh Evans*	780		
Independent	Llynfa Meinir Melba Thomas*	493		
Majority		287		
Labour win (new seat)				

=== Betws (one seat) ===
Betws 1999
Party	Candidate	Votes	%	±%
Labour	John Dorian Evans*	484		
Plaid Cymru	Brian Keith Vaughan	331		
Majority		153		
Labour hold		Swing		

=== Bigyn (two seats) ===
No boundary changes but the number of seats reduced from three to two.

Bigyn 1999
Party	Candidate	Votes	%	±%
Labour	Sandra Melita Cooke*	1,172		
Labour	David Charles Prothero*	1,077		
Liberal Democrats	Margaret Eileen Evans	856		
Liberal Democrats	Peter Buckley Jones	724		
Labour hold		Swing		
Labour hold		Swing		

=== Burry Port (two seats) ===
The Liberal Democrats won both seats in 1995 but Labour captured one of these in a by-election following the death of a sitting member.

Burry Port 1999
Party	Candidate	Votes	%	±%
Labour	Patricia Ethel Mary Jones*	1,217		
Labour	Peter Jewell	1,060		
Liberal Democrats	Pamela Georgina Every	589		
Labour hold		Swing		
Labour gain from Liberal Democrats		Swing		

=== Bynea (one seat) ===
Bynea 1999
Party	Candidate	Votes	%	±%
Labour	Thomas Dillwyn Bowen*	unopposed		
Labour hold		Swing		

=== Carmarthen Town North (two seats) ===
Carmarthen Town North 1999
Party	Candidate	Votes	%	±%
Labour	Kenneth Bryan Maynard*	1,014		
Independent	David Howell Merriman*	979		
Plaid Cymru	Llyr Hughes Griffiths	965		
Labour	Richard Evans	658		
Labour hold		Swing		
Independent hold		Swing		

=== Carmarthen Town South (two seats) ===
One of the seats was won by the Liberal Democrats in 1995 but lost to an Independent at a by-election following the death of the sitting member. The sitting Labour councillor, who had served on Carmarthen District Council since 1979, was de-selected by the party but was re-elected as an Independent Labour candidate.

Carmarthen Town South 1999
Party	Candidate	Votes	%	±%
Independent	June Williams*	774		
Independent Labour	John Russell Davies*	551		
Plaid Cymru	Geraint Thomas	547		
Labour	Philip William Grice	397		
Labour	Mandy Diane Peters	321		
Independent hold		Swing		
Independent Labour gain from Labour		Swing		

=== Carmarthen Town West (two seats) ===
Carmarthen Town West 1999
Party	Candidate	Votes	%	±%
Independent	William Gwynoro Jones*	875		
Labour	Arthur Davies	747		
Labour	Douglas Edmund Ynyr Richards Rose	666		
Independent hold		Swing		
Labour hold		Swing		

=== Cenarth (one seat) ===
Cenarth 1999
Party	Candidate	Votes	%	±%
Plaid Cymru	John David George Crossley	434		
Independent	Trevor Glyn Bryant	342		
Independent	Alan Wyndham Jones*	292		
Majority		92		
Plaid Cymru gain from Independent		Swing		

=== Cilycwm (one seat) ===
Boundary change.

Cilycwm 1999
Party	Candidate	Votes	%	±%
Independent	Thomas Theophilus*	unopposed		
Independent win (new seat)				

=== Cynwyl Elfed (one seat) ===
Boundary Change. Two sitting members contested the seat.

Cynwyl Elfed 1999
Party	Candidate	Votes	%	±%
Independent	William Dorrien Thomas*	834		
Independent	Henry Irfon Jones*	793		
Majority		41		
Independent win (new seat)				

=== Cynwyl Gaeo (one seat) ===
Boundary Change.

Cynwyl Gaeo 1999
Party	Candidate	Votes	%	±%
Plaid Cymru	James Eirwyn Williams*	unopposed		
Plaid Cymru win (new seat)				

=== Dafen (one seat) ===
Dafen 1999
Party	Candidate	Votes	%	±%
Labour	Vernon John Warlow*	568		
Plaid Cymru	Alford Clement Thomas	562		
Majority		6		
Labour hold		Swing		

=== Elli (one seat) ===
Elli 1999
Party	Candidate	Votes	%	±%
Liberal Democrats	Pamela Jean Edmunds	652		
Labour	Eryl Morgan	556		
Majority		96		
Liberal Democrats gain from Labour		Swing		

=== Felinfoel (one seat) ===
Felinfoel 1999
Party	Candidate	Votes	%	±%
Labour	Henry John Evans*	450		
Independent	Frederick Janes	185		
Majority		265		
Labour hold		Swing		

=== Garnant (one seat) ===
Garnant 1999
Party	Candidate	Votes	%	±%
Labour	Kevin Madge*	unopposed		
Labour hold		Swing		

=== Glanaman (one seat) ===
Glanaman 1999
Party	Candidate	Votes	%	±%
Labour	David Colin Evans	unopposed		
Labour hold		Swing		

=== Glanymor (two seats) ===
Glanymor 1999
Party	Candidate	Votes	%	±%
Labour	David Tudor James*	978		
Labour	Gerald Frederick Meyler*	807		
Green	Simon Kristen Phillips	367		
Liberal Democrats	Jonathan Edward Burree	316		
Liberal Democrats	Nicholas Charles Burree	306		
Labour hold		Swing		
Labour hold		Swing		

=== Glyn (one seat) ===
Glyn 1999
Party	Candidate	Votes	%	±%
Independent	Thomas James Jones	636		
Labour	John David Greville Williams	327		
Majority		309		
Independent gain from Labour		Swing		

=== Gorslas (two seats) ===
Gorslas 1999
Party	Candidate	Votes	%	±%
Independent	Henry Clive Scourfield	889		
Labour	Ryan Jones*	852		
Plaid Cymru	Nimrod Morris	819		
Labour	David Wynford Nicholas	742		
Independent gain from Ratepayers				
Labour hold		Swing		

=== Hendy (one seat) ===
Hendy 1999
Party	Candidate	Votes	%	±%
Plaid Cymru	William Ieuan Bryant James	625		
Labour	Tegwen Devichand	326		
Socialist Labour	Darran Charles Hickery	135		
Green	Janet Mary Cliff	92		
Majority		299		
Plaid Cymru hold		Swing		

=== Hengoed (two seats) ===
Hengoed 1999
Party	Candidate	Votes	%	±%
Labour	Kenneth Owen Edwards*	756		
Plaid Cymru	Meilyr Bowen Hughes	712		
Labour	Brian John Richards	684		
Plaid Cymru	Barry Williams Roberts	676		
Labour hold		Swing		
Plaid Cymru gain from Labour		Swing		

=== Kidwelly (one seat) ===
Kidwelly
Party	Candidate	Votes	%	±%
Independent Labour	Gwilym Glanmor Jones*	627		
Plaid Cymru	Jean Margaret Fox	486		
Labour	Hywel Glyndwr Rees	413		
Majority		141		
Independent Labour hold		Swing		

=== Laugharne Township (one seat) ===
Laugharne Township
Party	Candidate	Votes	%	±%
Independent	Cyril William Roberts*	759		
Labour	David Peter Tucker	403		
Majority		356		
Independent hold		Swing		

=== Llanboidy (one seat) ===
Llanboidy
Party	Candidate	Votes	%	±%
Independent	John Gibbin*	unopposed		
Independent hold		Swing		

=== Llanddarog (one seat) ===
Llanddarog
Party	Candidate	Votes	%	±%
Ratepayer	William John Wyn Evans*	unopposed		
Ratepayer hold		Swing		

=== Llandeilo (one seat) ===
Llandeilo
Party	Candidate	Votes	%	±%
Independent	Ieuan Goronwy Jones	1,142		
Labour	Julie Hopley	248		
Conservative	Shirley Arnold	97		
Majority				
Independent hold		Swing		

=== Llandovery Town (one seat) ===
Llandovery Town
Party	Candidate	Votes	%	±%
Plaid Cymru	Denley Owen*	786		
Labour	Vivienne Fay Price	230		
Conservative	Lorraine Kaye Allott	180		
Majority		556		
Plaid Cymru hold		Swing		

=== Llandybie (two seats) ===
Llandybie
Party	Candidate	Votes	%	±%
Independent	Mary Helena Thomas*	1,411		
Independent	Gerald James Earl*	1,262		
Labour	William Joseph Spencer	664		
Independent hold		Swing		
Independent hold		Swing		

=== Llanegwad and Llanfynydd (one seat) ===
Llanegwad and Llanfynydd
Party	Candidate	Votes	%	±%
Independent	Dillwyn Anthony Williams*	1,019		
Liberal Democrats	Alleyne Caroline Farrington Evans	197		
Majority				
Independent hold		Swing		

=== Llanfihangel Aberbythych (one seat) ===
Llanfihangel Aberbythych
Party	Candidate	Votes	%	±%
Independent	Winston Kenneth Griffiths	390		
Labour	Omri Philip Davies	327		
Conservative	Neville Kingsley Lewis Thomas	105		
Majority		63		
Independent hold		Swing		

=== Llanfihangel-ar-Arth (one seat) ===
Llanfihangel-ar-Arth
Party	Candidate	Votes	%	±%
Plaid Cymru	Fioled Meirion Jones*	unopposed		
Plaid Cymru hold		Swing		

=== Llangadog (one seat) ===
No Boundary Change. Ward named changed.

Llangadog
Party	Candidate	Votes	%	±%
Independent	Thomas Meirion Thomas*	unopposed		
Independent hold		Swing		

=== Llangeler (one seat) ===
Llangeler
Party	Candidate	Votes	%	±%
Independent	Thomas Wilfred Davies*	unopposed		
Independent hold		Swing		

=== Llangennech (two seats) ===
Llangenench
Party	Candidate	Votes	%	±%
Plaid Cymru	William Gwyn Hopkins*	953		
Plaid Cymru	Gwyneth Thomas	857		
Labour	Thomas Gordon Lewis*	644		
Labour	Sefton Ronald Coslett	561		
Socialist Labour	John Willock	184		
Plaid Cymru hold		Swing		
Plaid Cymru gain from Labour		Swing		

=== Llangunnor (one seat) ===
Llangunnor
Party	Candidate	Votes	%	±%
Independent	Clifford Merlin Jones*	unopposed		
Independent hold		Swing		

=== Llangyndeyrn (one seat) ===
An unusual situation arose in this ward where the sitting Labour member (and previously a member of Dyfed County Council since 1981) announced shortly before the close of nominations that he would not stand and pledged his support to the Plaid Cymru candidate.

Llangyndeyrn
Party	Candidate	Votes	%	±%
Plaid Cymru	William Tyssul Evans	1,086		
Independent Labour	Dynfor Vaughan Owens	291		
Majority				
Plaid Cymru gain from Labour		Swing		

=== Llannon (two seats) ===
The previous Cross Hands (one seat) and Tumble (two seats) wards were merged to form a new two-seat ward. Three sitting councillors sought election.

Llannon
Party	Candidate	Votes	%	±%
Plaid Cymru	Neil William Baker	1,090		
Independent Labour	Philip Brinley Davies*	1,040		
Labour	Terrence Maxwell Evans*	822		
Labour	David Bryan Richards*	753		
Plaid Cymru win (new seat)				
Independent Labour win (new seat)				

=== Llansteffan (one seat) ===
Llansteffan
Party	Candidate	Votes	%	±%
Independent	John Arthur Jones Harries*	unopposed		
Independent hold		Swing		

=== Llanybydder (one seat) ===
Llanybydder
Party	Candidate	Votes	%	±%
Independent	Ieuan Wyn Davies	unopposed		
Independent hold		Swing		

=== Lliedi (two seats) ===
Lliedi
Party	Candidate	Votes	%	±%
Labour	William George Thomas*	1,042		
Labour	William Edward Skinner*	985		
Liberal Democrats	Kenneth Denver Rees	781		
Liberal Democrats	Hugh Morgan Lewis	780		
Labour hold		Swing		
Labour hold		Swing		

=== Llwynhendy (two seats) ===
No boundary change. One of the sitting Labour councillors was de-selected but successfully retained the seat as an Independent Labour candidate.

Llwynhendy
Party	Candidate	Votes	%	±%
Labour	Eunydd Ashley Brynmor Thomas*	796		
Independent Labour	Donald John Davies*	778		
Labour	Benjamin C.M. Reynolds	674		
Labour hold		Swing		
Independent Labour gain from Labour		Swing		

=== Manordeilo and Salem (one seat) ===
Manordeilo and Salem
Party	Candidate	Votes	%	±%
Independent	John James Jones Davies*	759		
Plaid Cymru	Margaret Bowen	269		
Majority				
Independent hold		Swing		

=== Pembrey (two seats) ===
One of the sitting Labour members was de-selected and stood unsuccessfully as an Independent.

Pembrey
Party	Candidate	Votes	%	±%
Labour	John Clive Howells	756		
Labour	Vincent John Rees*	753		
Independent	Trevor Uriel Jones Thomas*	717		
Labour hold		Swing		
Labour hold		Swing		

=== Penygroes (one seat) ===
Penygroes
Party	Candidate	Votes	%	±%
Plaid Cymru	Siân Elisabeth Thomas	659		
Labour	Elizabeth Ann Phillips	414		
Majority		245		

=== Pontamman (one seat) ===
Pontamman
Party	Candidate	Votes	%	±%
Labour	Kenneth Alvan Rees*	unopposed		
Labour hold		Swing		

=== Pontyberem (one seat) ===
Pontyberem
Party	Candidate	Votes	%	±%
Independent Labour	Thomas Ieuan Edwards*	879		
Labour	John Wynford Treharne	303		
Majority		576		
Independent Labour hold		Swing		

=== Quarter Bach (one seat) ===
No boundary changes. Ward name changed.

Quarter Bach
Party	Candidate	Votes	%	±%
Labour	Elwyn Williams*	unopposed		
Labour hold		Swing		

=== St Clears (one seat) ===
St Clears 1999
Party	Candidate	Votes	%	±%
Independent	Philip Morris Hughes	632		
Independent	Lillian Margaret Owen	414		
Independent	Keith Hopkins	247		
Labour	Tammara Michelle Wilband	61		
Majority		218		
Independent hold		Swing		

=== St Ishmaels (one seat) ===
St Ishmaels
Party	Candidate	Votes	%	±%
Plaid Cymru	David Huw John*	unopposed		
Plaid Cymru win (new seat)				

=== Saron (two seats) ===
No boundary changes but an additional seat created

Saron
Party	Candidate	Votes	%	±%
Plaid Cymru	John Garfield Edwards	920		
Plaid Cymru	Nigel Henry Evans	793		
Labour	Alan Peter Cooper	754		
Labour	Terrence H. Marshall*	582		
Majority		123		
Plaid Cymru gain from Labour		Swing		
Plaid Cymru win (new seat)				

=== Swiss Valley (one seat) ===
Swiss Valley
Party	Candidate	Votes	%	±%
Labour	Stuart Hopkins	744		
Independent	Noel Roberts	337		
Majority		407		
Labour gain from Independent		Swing		

=== Trelech (one seat) ===
Trelech
Party	Candidate	Votes	%	±%
Independent	William David Thomas*	unopposed		
Independent hold		Swing		

=== Trimsaran (one seat) ===
Trimsaran
Party	Candidate	Votes	%	±%
Independent	Meryl Gravell*	548		
Liberal Democrats	Thomas Cooper	332		
Labour	David Taylor	181		
Independent	Denis Henry Carter	36		
Majority		216		
Independent hold		Swing		

=== Tycroes (one seat) ===
Tycroes
Party	Candidate	Votes	%	±%
Labour	David Thomas Enoch	526		
Plaid Cymru	Kenneth Rees Morgan	370		
Majority		156		
Labour hold		Swing		

=== Tyisha (two seats) ===
Tyisha
Party	Candidate	Votes	%	±%
Labour	David Samuel Neil*	1,040		
Labour	Harry Palmer*	958		
Plaid Cymru	Dyfrig Thomas+	739		
Labour hold		Swing		
Labour hold		Swing		

=== Whitland (one seat) ===
Whitland
Party	Candidate	Votes	%	±%
Independent	James Morris Morgan*	933		
Independent	William Conwil Harries	364		
Majority				
Independent win (new seat)				

== By-elections 1999-2004 ==
=== Pontyberem 2000 ===
A by-election was held in the Pontyberem ward following the death of Independent Labour councillor Ieuan Edwards.

Pontyberem by-election, 25 May 2000
Party	Candidate	Votes	%	±%
Plaid Cymru	Joy Williams	655	60.4	
Labour		399	36.8	
Conservative		31	2.98	
Majority				
Turnout				
Registered electors				
Plaid Cymru gain from Independent Labour		Swing		

=== Hengoed 2001 ===
Hengoed by-election, 26 July 2001
Party	Candidate	Votes	%	±%
Labour		348		
Plaid Cymru		293		
Independent		118		
Conservative		70		
Majority				
Turnout				
Registered electors				
Labour hold		Swing		

=== Llandybie 2001 ===
A by-election was held in the Llandybie ward following the death of Independent councillor Gerald Earl, who had represented the ward on the Dyfed and Carmarthenshire councils since 1973.

Burry Port by-election, 11 October 2001
Party	Candidate	Votes	%	±%
Labour	Anthony Wyn Jones	504		
Plaid Cymru		316		
Independent		266		
Independent		151		
Majority				
Turnout				
Registered electors				
Labour gain from Independent		Swing		
