= District of Dinefwr =

District of Wales (1974–1996)

Coordinates: 51.883°N 4.013°W

Dinefwr
- History
  - Created: 1 April 1974
  - Abolished: 31 March 1996
  - Succeeded by: Carmarthenshire
- Status: Borough
  - HQ: Llandeilo

Dinefwr was one of six local government districts of the county of Dyfed, Wales from 1974 to 1996. It was named after Dinefwr Castle which in the Middle Ages had been the court of the House of Dinefwr and one of the three principal royal courts of Wales with Aberffraw and Shrewsbury.

== History ==
The district was formed on 1 April 1974 under the Local Government Act 1972, covering the area of five former districts from the administrative county of Carmarthenshire, which were abolished at the same time:

- Ammanford Urban District
- Cwmamman Urban District
- Llandeilo Rural District
- Llandeilo Urban District
- Llandovery Municipal Borough

The district held borough status, allowing the chair of the council to take the title of mayor.

Dinefwr borough was abolished 22 years later under the Local Government (Wales) Act 1994, with the area becoming part of the new Carmarthenshire unitary authority on 1 April 1996.

== Political control ==
The first election to the council was held in 1973, initially operating as a shadow authority before coming into its powers on 1 April 1974. Political control of the council from 1974 until the council's abolition in 1996 was held by the following parties:as follows:

Party in control	Years
Labour	1974–1976
Independent	1976–1983
Labour	1983–1991
No overall control	1991–1996

== Elections ==
- 1973 Dinefwr Borough Council election
- 1976 Dinefwr Borough Council election
- 1979 Dinefwr Borough Council election
- 1983 Dinefwr Borough Council election
- 1987 Dinefwr Borough Council election (new ward boundaries)
- 1991 Dinefwr Borough Council election

== Premises ==
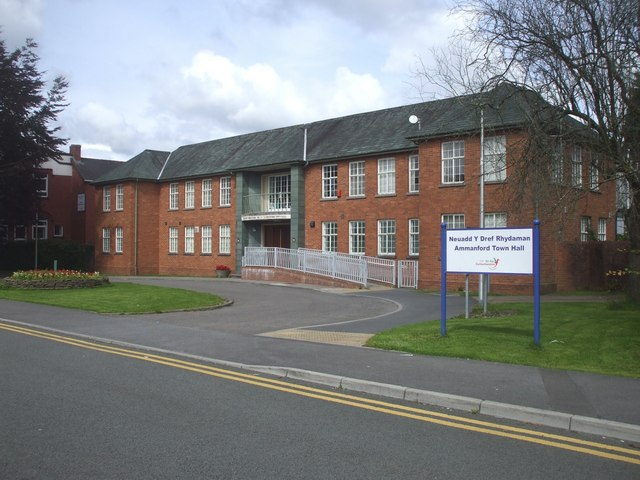
Ammanford Town Hall, one of the council's offices

The council had its headquarters at the Municipal Offices at 30 Crescent Road, Llandeilo, which had previously been the offices of Llandeilo Rural District Council. It also used Ammanford Town Hall as an area office.

== See also ==
- Dinefwr Park
- Dinefwr Castle
- House of Dinefwr
