= Carmarthen Town West =

Electoral ward in Carmarthenshire, Wales

Carmarthen Town West (Welsh: Gorllewin Tref Caerfyrddin) is an electoral ward, representing part of the community of Carmarthen, Carmarthenshire, Wales.

== Profile ==
In 2014, the Carmarthen Town West electoral ward had an electorate of 4,124. The total population was 5,335, of whom 75.8% were born in Wales. The 2011 census indicated that 37.2% of the population were able to speak Welsh.

== History ==
Carmarthen Town West has been an electoral ward since the 1940s. It was previously known as Carmarthen Town No.3 Ward. It is currently a two-member electoral ward for the purposes of elections to Carmarthenshire County Council and a six-member electoral ward for elections to Carmarthen Town Council.

From 1973 until 1996 it was a single-member ward for the purposes of elections to Dyfed County Council and a three-member ward for elections to Carmarthen District Council

== County Council elections ==
In 2017 the ward seats were won by Plaid Cymru councillors Emlyn Schiavone and Alan Speake.

Carmarthenshire County Council election, 4 May 2017
Party	Candidate	Votes	%	±%
Plaid Cymru	Emlyn Schiavone	739		
Plaid Cymru	Alan Speake*	661		
Independent	Arthur Davies	510		
Independent	Russell Sparks	454		
Labour	Matthew Geraint Thomas	255		
Labour	Julia Ann Ault	238		
Turnout				
Plaid Cymru hold		Swing		
Plaid Cymru hold		Swing		
