= 1970 Carmarthenshire County Council election =

Welsh local election

An election to the Carmarthenshire County Council was held on 9 April 1970. It was preceded by the 1967 election and was the last election prior to the reorganization of local government in Wales. Carmarthenshire County Council was merged with Cardiganshire and Pembrokeshire to form the new county of Dyfed and the first elections to the new authority were held in 1973.

== Overview of the result ==
59 councillors were elected. The final elections to the council before dissolution saw the Independents retain control of the authority. The Plaid Cymru advance which was apparent in 1967 was halted and most candidates made little impact.

== Boundary changes ==
There were no boundary changes at this election.

== Unopposed returns ==
As in 1967, these were fewer in number than at most post-war elections.

== Contested elections ==
Contests took place in the majority of wards, and Labour lost some further ground in the Llanelli area while at the same time winning back some seats lost three years previously. Labour also won two seats in Carmarthen town for the first time.

== Ward results ==
=== Abergwili ===
Abergwili 1970
Party	Candidate	Votes	%	±%
Independent	D.H. Edwards*	unopposed		
Independent hold		Swing		

=== Ammanford No.1 ===
Ammanford No.1 1970
Party	Candidate	Votes	%	±%
Labour	Haydn Lewis*	924		
Plaid Cymru	J.D. Davies	466		
Labour hold		Swing		

=== Ammanford No.2 ===
Ammanford No.2 1970
Party	Candidate	Votes	%	±%
Labour	Myrddin Evans*	1,407		
Independent	M.G. Jenkins	324		
Labour hold		Swing		

=== Berwick ===
Berwick 1970
Party	Candidate	Votes	%	±%
Labour	John Raglan Thomas	1,058		
Independent	D.W. Davies	436		
Labour hold		Swing		

=== Burry Port East ===
Burry Port East 1970
Party	Candidate	Votes	%	±%
Independent	D.C. Thomas*	615		
Plaid Cymru	Leslie Thomas	210		
Labour	Labor Dennis**	230		
Independent hold		Swing		

=== Burry Port West ===
Burry Port West 1970
Party	Candidate	Votes	%	±%
Independent	Eirwen Jones Parry	460		
Labour	A.T. Wilkins*	450		
Plaid Cymru	G.T.G. Samuel	207		
Independent gain from Labour		Swing		

=== Caio ===
Caio 1970
Party	Candidate	Votes	%	±%
Independent	Trevor Wynne Davies*	unopposed		
Independent hold		Swing		

=== Carmarthen Division 1 ===
Carmarthen Division 1 1970
Party	Candidate	Votes	%	±%
Labour	T. Idwal Jones*	unopposed		
Labour hold		Swing		

=== Carmarthen Division 2 ===
Carmarthen Division 2 1970
Party	Candidate	Votes	%	±%
Labour	Ellis J. Powell	488		
Independent	R.B. Evans	365		
Plaid Cymru	J. Williams	283		
Independent	Mrs V.M. Chapman	80		
Labour gain from Independent		Swing		

=== Carmarthen Division 3 ===
Carmarthen Division 3 1970
Party	Candidate	Votes	%	±%
Independent	W.R. Nicholl	584		
Independent	T.J. Hurley	383		
Labour	G.B. Evans	137		
Independent hold		Swing		

=== Cenarth ===
Cenarth 1970
Party	Candidate	Votes	%	±%
Independent	G.E. Howell	711		
Independent	L.G. Roberts	319		
Independent hold		Swing		

=== Cilycwm ===
Cilycwm 1970
Party	Candidate	Votes	%	±%
Independent	James James*	297		
Independent	W.D.R. Davies	284		
Independent hold		Swing		

=== Conwil ===
Conwil 1970
Party	Candidate	Votes	%	±%
Independent	J.L. James	unopposed		
Independent hold		Swing		

=== Cwmamman ===
Cwmamman 1970
Party	Candidate	Votes	%	±%
Labour	John Walters*	unopposed		
Labour hold		Swing		

=== Felinfoel ===
Felinfoel 1970
Party	Candidate	Votes	%	±%
Labour	Arthur Cledwyn Francis*	1,310		
Plaid Cymru	Mrs M.M. Cook	360		
Labour hold		Swing		

=== Hengoed ===
Hengoed 1970
Party	Candidate	Votes	%	±%
Labour	D.J. Stone**	unopposed		
Labour hold		Swing		

=== Kidwelly ===
Kidwelly 1970
Party	Candidate	Votes	%	±%
Plaid Cymru	D. Leslie .W. Morris*	755		
Labour	W.H.D. Jones	683		
Plaid Cymru hold		Swing		

=== Laugharne ===
Laugharne 1970
Party	Candidate	Votes	%	±%
Independent	D.M. Jenkins	654		
Independent	Rev V.H. Jones*	583		
Independent hold		Swing		

=== Llanarthney ===
Llanarthney 1970
Party	Candidate	Votes	%	±%
Ratepayers	T. Austin Griffiths*	1,745		
Labour	Ryan Jones	845		
Ratepayers Association hold		Swing		

=== Llanboidy ===
Llanboidy 1970
Party	Candidate	Votes	%	±%
Independent	C.D. Evans*	unopposed		
Independent hold		Swing		

=== Llandebie North ===
Llandebie North 1970
Party	Candidate	Votes	%	±%
Labour	William Morris*	991		
Plaid Cymru	D.O. Davies	678		
Independent	T.J. Thomas	184		
Labour hold		Swing		

=== Llandebie South ===
Llandebie South 1967
Party	Candidate	Votes	%	±%
Labour	Idris Evans*	1,243		
Plaid Cymru	Andrew Williams	798		
Labour hold		Swing		

=== Llandilo Rural ===
Llandilo Rural 1970
Party	Candidate	Votes	%	±%
Independent	D.A. James*	unopposed		
Independent hold		Swing		

=== Llandilo Urban ===
Llandilo Urban 1970
Party	Candidate	Votes	%	±%
Labour	Elfryn Thomas	530		
Independent	D.T. Jones	441		
Labour hold		Swing		

=== Llandovery ===
Llandovery 1970
Party	Candidate	Votes	%	±%
Independent	D.T. Davies*	536		
Independent	David Hamilton Evans	473		
Independent hold		Swing		

=== Llandyssilio ===
Llandyssilio 1970
Party	Candidate	Votes	%	±%
Independent	Daniel Clodwyn Thomas*	unopposed		
Independent hold		Swing		

=== Llanedy ===
Llanedy 1970
Party	Candidate	Votes	%	±%
Labour	T.E. Williams*	unopposed		
Labour hold		Swing		

=== Llanegwad ===
Llanegwad 1970
Party	Candidate	Votes	%	±%
Independent	D.T. Price*	unopposed		
Independent hold		Swing		

=== Llanelly Division 1 ===
Llanelly Division 1 1970
Party	Candidate	Votes	%	±%
Independent	Harry J. Richards*	879		
Labour	H. Morris	584		
Independent hold		Swing		

=== Llanelly Division 2 ===
Llanelly Division 2 1970
Party	Candidate	Votes	%	±%
Labour	Brinley Owen*	697		
Plaid Cymru	W.H. Davies	223		
Labour hold		Swing		

=== Llanelly Division 3 ===
Llanelly Division 3 1970
Party	Candidate	Votes	%	±%
Labour	Eric Griffiths	444		
Plaid Cymru	Mrs P.D. Bevan	114		
Labour hold		Swing		

=== Llanelly Division 4 ===
Llanelly Division 4 1970
Party	Candidate	Votes	%	±%
Liberal	A.C.H. Robertson*	630		
Labour	A.C. Hemment	379		
Plaid Cymru	P. Davies	145		
Liberal hold		Swing		

=== Llanelly Division 5 ===
Llanelly Division 5 1970
Party	Candidate	Votes	%	±%
Labour	Grismond J. Williams	260		
Independent	Gwilym Gibby*	238		
Plaid Cymru	E.E. Jones	63		
Labour gain from Independent		Swing		

=== Llanelly Division 6 ===
Llanelly Division 6 1970
Party	Candidate	Votes	%	±%
Labour	William J. Davies*	358		
Plaid Cymru	M.J. Evans	159		
Labour gain from Independent Labour		Swing		

=== Llanelly Division 7 ===
Llanelly Division 7 1970
Party	Candidate	Votes	%	±%
Labour	R.A. James*	unopposed		
Labour hold		Swing		

=== Llanelly Division 8 ===
Llanelly Division 8 1970
Party	Candidate	Votes	%	±%
Labour	George M. McConkey*	unopposed		
Labour hold		Swing		

=== Llanelly Division 9 ===
Llanelly Division 9 1970
Party	Candidate	Votes	%	±%
Labour	S.I. Thomas**	unopposed		
Labour hold		Swing		

=== Llanfihangel Aberbythych ===
Llanfihangel Aberbythych 1970
Party	Candidate	Votes	%	±%
Independent	David Ivor James Evans*	unopposed		
Independent hold		Swing		

=== Llanfihangel-ar-Arth ===
Llanfihangel-ar-Arth 1970
Party	Candidate	Votes	%	±%
Independent	William Harry*	546		
Plaid Cymru	Gerallt Jones	301		
Independent hold		Swing		

=== Llangadog ===
Llangadog 1970
Party	Candidate	Votes	%	±%
Independent	D.T. Williams*	unopposed		
Independent hold		Swing		

=== Llangeler ===
Llangeler 1970
Party	Candidate	Votes	%	±%
Labour	D.T. Enoch*	unopposed		
Labour hold		Swing		

=== Llangendeirne ===
Llangendeirne 1970
Party	Candidate	Votes	%	±%
Labour	Tom Evans*	unopposed		
Labour hold		Swing		

=== Llangennech ===
Llangennech 1964
Party	Candidate	Votes	%	±%
Labour	M.J. Thomas	538		
Independent	T.G. Lewis	456		
Plaid Cymru	Hywel Teifi Edwards	438		
Labour hold		Swing		

=== Llangunnor ===
Llangunnor 1970
Party	Candidate	Votes	%	±%
Independent	J. Arthur J. Harries*	unopposed		
Independent hold		Swing		

=== Llanon ===
Llanon 1970
Party	Candidate	Votes	%	±%
Labour	David William James*	1,389		
Plaid Cymru	E.D. Evans	615		
Labour hold		Swing		

=== Llansawel ===
Llansawel 1970
Party	Candidate	Votes	%	±%
Independent	D. Idris Davies*	unopposed		
Independent hold		Swing		

=== Llanstephan ===
Llanstephan 1970
Party	Candidate	Votes	%	±%
Independent	R.H.F. John*	unopposed		
Independent hold		Swing		

=== Llanybyther ===
Llanybyther 1970
Party	Candidate	Votes	%	±%
Independent	William Evans*	unopposed		
Independent hold		Swing		

=== Myddfai ===
Myddfai 1970
Party	Candidate	Votes	%	±%
Independent	E.G. Morgan*	unopposed		
Independent hold		Swing		

=== Pembrey ===
Pembrey 1970
Party	Candidate	Votes	%	±%
Labour	G.P. Evans	1,212		
Plaid Cymru	Mrs J. Lewis	329		
Labour gain from Plaid Cymru		Swing		

=== Pontyberem ===
Pontyberem 1970
Party	Candidate	Votes	%	±%
Labour	Howard Jones*	1,414		
Independent	T.M. Morris	769		
Democrat	T. Ieuan Edwards	346		
Labour hold		Swing		

=== Quarter Bach ===
Quarter Bach 1970
Party	Candidate	Votes	%	±%
Labour	Josiah Jones**	1,468		
Plaid Cymru	Elfyn Talfan Davies	494		
Labour hold		Swing		

=== Rhydcymerau ===
Rhydcymerau 1970
Party	Candidate	Votes	%	±%
Independent	D.M. Thomas*	unopposed		
Independent hold		Swing		

=== St Clears ===
St Clears 1970
Party	Candidate	Votes	%	±%
Independent	Rev H.D. Griffiths*	876		
Independent	W.E.V.J. Davies	709		
Independent hold		Swing		

=== St Ishmaels ===
St Ishmaels 1970
Party	Candidate	Votes	%	±%
Independent	E.T. Davies	unopposed		
Independent hold		Swing		

=== Trelech ===
Trelech 1970
Party	Candidate	Votes	%	±%
Independent	T.S. Davies	536		
Independent	Mrs A.M. Thomas	285		
Independent hold		Swing		

=== Trimsaran ===
Trimsaran 1970
Party	Candidate	Votes	%	±%
Labour	Samuel T. Hughes*	932		
Plaid Cymru	M. Davies	262		
Labour hold		Swing		

=== Westfa ===
Westfa 1970
Party	Candidate	Votes	%	±%
Labour	W.J. Franklyn Thomas*	571		
Plaid Cymru	Brinley Thomas	295		
Labour hold		Swing		

=== Whitland ===
Whitland 1970
Party	Candidate	Votes	%	±%
Independent	H.G. James*	unopposed		
Independent hold		Swing		

== Election of aldermen ==
In addition to the 59 councillors the council consisted of 19 county aldermen. Aldermen were elected by the council, and served a six-year term. Following the elections, the majority of the aldermanic seats were taken by Labour.

=== Retiring aldermen ===
A number of retiring councillors stood down to allow retiring aldermen to be returned unopposed.
