= 1967 Carmarthenshire County Council election =

Welsh local election

An election to the Carmarthenshire County Council was held on 13 April 1967. It was preceded by the 1964 election and followed by the 1970 election.

== Overview of the result ==
The politics of the county had been transformed following the victory of Gwynfor Evans at the Carmarthen by-election in the previous year. This led to an increased number of Plaid Cymru candidates although they had limited success. The party polled well in several Llanelli wards. Another feature was the appearance of Liberal candidates for the first time for many years.

After a series of elections where Labour strengthened their majority on the Council the party suffered a number of losses and a majority of the elected councillors were Independents. The Labour losses included Douglas Hughes, leader of the Council and a member since 1928.

== Boundary changes ==
There were no boundary changes at this election.

== Retiring aldermen ==
A number of retiring Labour councillors stood down to allow retiring aldermen to be returned unopposed.

== Unopposed returns ==
A number of members were again returned unopposed, but these were fewer in number than at most post-war elections.

== Contested elections ==
Of the contests that took place, the most notable were in Llanelli town where the leader of the authority, Alderman Douglas Hughes ( a member since 1928) and his wife Alderman Loti Rhys Hughes (a member since 1946) were both defeated. Another long-serving member. Alderman Emrys Aubrey, only narrowly held his seat at Westfa. Labour lost seats at Burry Port to the Independents and at Kidwelly and Pembrey to Plaid Cymru.

Within the Carmarthen parliamentary constituency, Plaid Cymru won no seats but stood for the first time at Quarter Bach and both Llandybie seats, polling well in each instance.

== Results ==
59 councillors were elected.

== Ward results ==
=== Abergwili ===
Abergwili 1964
Party	Candidate	Votes	%	±%
Independent	William John Phillips*	unopposed		
Independent hold		Swing		

=== Ammanford No.1 ===
Ammanford No.1 1964
Party	Candidate	Votes	%	±%
Labour	Frank Davies**	unopposed		
Labour hold		Swing		

=== Ammanford No.2 ===
Ammanford No.2 1967
Party	Candidate	Votes	%	±%
Labour	Thomas Elias Evans*	772		
Plaid Cymru	D.S. Gwynfor Evans	513		
Labour hold		Swing		

=== Berwick ===
Berwick 1967
Party	Candidate	Votes	%	±%
Labour	William Isaac Daniel*	970		
Plaid Cymru	E. Pugh	688		
Labour hold		Swing		

=== Burry Port East ===
Burry Port East 1967
Party	Candidate	Votes	%	±%
Independent	D.C. Thomas	505		
Independent Labour	W. Evans	497		
Plaid Cymru	Leslie Thomas	210		
Labour	I.Ll. Jones*	115		
Independent gain from Labour		Swing		

=== Burry Port West ===
Burry Port West 1967
Party	Candidate	Votes	%	±%
Labour	A.T. Wilkins*	521		
Plaid Cymru	W.G. Wilkins	391		
Independent	Eirwen Jones Parry	274		
Labour hold		Swing		

=== Caio ===
Caio 1967
Party	Candidate	Votes	%	±%
Independent	Trevor Wynne Davies*	462		
Plaid Cymru	Rhys Dafys Williams	267		
Independent hold		Swing		

=== Carmarthen Division 1 ===
Carmarthen Division 1 1961
Party	Candidate	Votes	%	±%
Labour	G.V. Davies**	1,364		
Independent	T.J. Hurley	513		
Labour hold		Swing		

=== Carmarthen Division 2 ===
Carmarthen Division 2 1967
Party	Candidate	Votes	%	±%
Independent	David Mansel Thomas*	839		
Labour	Ivor M. Morris	217		
Independent hold		Swing		

=== Carmarthen Division 3 ===
Carmarthen Division 3 1967
Party	Candidate	Votes	%	±%
Independent	D. Denzil Harries*	801		
Labour	Emrys Rees			
Independent hold		Swing		

=== Cenarth ===
Cenarth 1964
Party	Candidate	Votes	%	±%
Independent	D.G. James Jones*	unopposed		
Independent hold		Swing		

=== Cilycwm ===
Cilycwm 1967
Party	Candidate	Votes	%	±%
Independent	James James*	303		
Independent	W.D.R. Davies	262		
Independent hold		Swing		

=== Conwil ===
Conwil 1964
Party	Candidate	Votes	%	±%
Independent	W.A. Phillips*	unopposed		
Independent hold		Swing		

=== Cwmamman ===
Cwmamman 1964
Party	Candidate	Votes	%	±%
Labour		unopposed		
Labour hold		Swing		

=== Felinfoel ===
Felinfoel 1964
Party	Candidate	Votes	%	±%
Labour	Arthur Cledwyn Francis*	unopposed		
Labour hold		Swing		

=== Hengoed ===
Hengoed 1964
Party	Candidate	Votes	%	±%
Labour	D.J. Stone**	unopposed		
Labour hold		Swing		

=== Kidwelly ===
Kidwelly 1967
Party	Candidate	Votes	%	±%
Plaid Cymru	D.L.W. Morris	733		
Labour	H.J. Owen	625		
Plaid Cymru gain from Labour		Swing		

=== Laugharne ===
Laugharne 1964
Party	Candidate	Votes	%	±%
Independent	Tudor H. Fleming Williams*	unopposed		
Independent hold		Swing		

=== Llanarthney ===
Llanarthney 1967
Party	Candidate	Votes	%	±%
Ratepayers	T. Austin Griffiths*	1,493		
Labour	Percy M. Lewis	961		
Ratepayers hold		Swing		

=== Llanboidy ===
Llanboidy 1967
Party	Candidate	Votes	%	±%
Independent	William Joshua Phillips*	553		
Plaid Cymru	E. Evans	99		
Independent hold		Swing		

=== Llandebie North ===
Llandebie North 1967
Party	Candidate	Votes	%	±%
Labour	William Morris*	798		
Plaid Cymru	D.T. Williams	763		
Labour hold		Swing		

=== Llandebie South ===
Llandebie South 1967
Party	Candidate	Votes	%	±%
Labour	Idris Evans*	856		
Plaid Cymru	W.P. Jones	829		
Independent	D.B. Davies	366		
Labour hold		Swing		

=== Llandilo Rural ===
Llandilo Rural 1967
Party	Candidate	Votes	%	±%
Independent	David Marlais Humphreys*	768		
Labour	C. Loynton	395		
Independent hold		Swing		

=== Llandilo Urban ===
Llandilo Urban 1964
Party	Candidate	Votes	%	±%
Labour	D.W Watkin*	unopposed		
Labour hold		Swing		

=== Llandovery ===
Llandovery 1967
Party	Candidate	Votes	%	±%
Independent	William J. Davies*	711		
Independent	R. Eggleston	205		
Independent hold		Swing		

=== Llandyssilio ===
Llandyssilio 1964
Party	Candidate	Votes	%	±%
Independent	Daniel Clodwyn Thomas*	unopposed		
Independent hold		Swing		

=== Llanedy ===
Llanedy 1964
Party	Candidate	Votes	%	±%
Labour	T.E. Williams*	1,284		
Plaid Cymru	Gwyn Hopkins	280		
Labour hold		Swing		

=== Llanegwad ===
Llanegwad 1964
Party	Candidate	Votes	%	±%
Independent	M.Ll. Griffiths*	unopposed		
Independent hold		Swing		

=== Llanelly Division.1 ===
Llanelly Division.1 1964
Party	Candidate	Votes	%	±%
Labour	Dr H.D. Llewellyn*	unopposed		
Labour hold		Swing		

=== Llanelly Division 2 ===
Llanelly Division 2 1964
Party	Candidate	Votes	%	±%
Labour	Brinley Owen*	843		
Independent	W. John Thomas	642		
Labour hold		Swing		

=== Llanelly Division 3 ===
Llanelly Division 3 1967
Party	Candidate	Votes	%	±%
Labour	Eric Griffiths	458		
Liberal	H.F. Denman	347		
Labour hold		Swing		

=== Llanelly Division 4 ===
Llanelly Division 4 1967
Party	Candidate	Votes	%	±%
Liberal	A.C.H. Robertson	727		
Plaid Cymru	P. Davies	511		
Labour	Lottie Rees Hughes**	303		
Independent	L.B. Rees	133		
Liberal gain from Labour		Swing		

=== Llanelly Division 5 ===
Llanelly Division 5 1967
Party	Candidate	Votes	%	±%
Independent	Gwilym Gibby*	271		
Plaid Cymru	E.M. Jones	195		
Labour	Sidney Lewis	165		
Independent hold		Swing		

=== Llanelly Division 6 ===
Llanelly Division 6 1967
Party	Candidate	Votes	%	±%
Independent Labour	F. Griffiths	503		
Plaid Cymru	M.Ll. Evans	276		
Labour	William Douglas Hughes**	182		
Independent Labour gain from Labour		Swing		

=== Llanelly Division 7 ===
Llanelly Division 7 1967
Party	Candidate	Votes	%	±%
Labour	D.J. Williams*	757		
Plaid Cymru	W.H. Davies	397		
Labour hold		Swing		

=== Llanelly Division 8 ===
Llanelly Division 8 1964
Party	Candidate	Votes	%	±%
Labour	George M. McConkey*	unopposed		
Labour hold		Swing		

=== Llanelly Division 9 ===
Llanelly Division 9 1967
Party	Candidate	Votes	%	±%
Labour	S.B. Ohlsson*	601		
Independent	W.A. Tilleke	274		
Labour hold		Swing		

=== Llanfihangel Aberbythych ===
Llanfihangel Aberbythych 1964
Party	Candidate	Votes	%	±%
Independent	David Ivor James Evans*	unopposed		
Independent hold		Swing		

=== Llanfihangel-ar-Arth ===
Llanfihangel-ar-Arth 1964
Party	Candidate	Votes	%	±%
Independent	William Harry*	674		
Independent	Daniel Rees Thomas	352		
Independent hold		Swing		

=== Llangadog ===
Llangadog 1967
Party	Candidate	Votes	%	±%
Plaid Cymru	Gwynfor Richard Evans*	Unopposed	N/A	N/A
Plaid Cymru hold				

=== Llangeler ===
Llangeler 1964
Party	Candidate	Votes	%	±%
Independent	John Evans	unopposed		
Independent hold		Swing		

=== Llangendeirne ===
Llangendeirne 1964
Party	Candidate	Votes	%	±%
Labour	Tom Evans*	unopposed		
Labour hold		Swing		

=== Llangennech ===
Llangennech 1964
Party	Candidate	Votes	%	±%
Labour	John William Boyles*	unopposed		
Labour hold		Swing		

=== Llangunnor ===
Llangunnor 1967
Party	Candidate	Votes	%	±%
Independent	John Dobson Phelps*	369		
Independent	J. Arthur J. Harries	332		
Plaid Cymru	Hywel Lloyd Williams	324		
Independent	D.D. Protheroe	184		
Independent hold		Swing		

=== Llanon ===
Llanon 1964
Party	Candidate	Votes	%	±%
Labour	David William James*	unopposed		
Labour hold		Swing		

=== Llansawel ===
Llansawel 1964
Party	Candidate	Votes	%	±%
Independent	John Morgan*	288		
Independent	D.R. Williams	235		
Independent hold		Swing		

=== Llanstephan ===
Llanstephan 1964
Party	Candidate	Votes	%	±%
Independent	J.H. Davies*	unopposed		
Independent hold		Swing		

=== Llanybyther ===
Llanybyther 1967
Party	Candidate	Votes	%	±%
Independent	William Evans	910		
Independent	Benjamin Edward Davies*	596		
Independent hold		Swing		

=== Myddfai ===
Myddfai 1964
Party	Candidate	Votes	%	±%
Independent	Morgan Lewis Jones*	261		
Independent	Samuel Christmas Price	195		
Independent hold		Swing		

=== Pembrey ===
Pembrey 1967
Party	Candidate	Votes	%	±%
Plaid Cymru	G. Lewis	635		
Labour	S.J. Elwyn Samuel	614		
Plaid Cymru gain from Labour		Swing		

=== Pontyberem ===
Pontyberem 1964
Party	Candidate	Votes	%	±%
Labour	David John Jones*	unopposed		
Labour hold		Swing		

=== Quarter Bach ===
Quarter Bach 1967
Party	Candidate	Votes	%	±%
Labour	P. George*	1,151		
Plaid Cymru	Elfyn Talfan Davies	826		
Labour hold		Swing		

=== Rhydcymerau ===
Rhydcymerau 1964
Party	Candidate	Votes	%	±%
Independent	David Arthur Evans*	unopposed		
Independent hold		Swing		

=== St Clears ===
St Clears 1967
Party	Candidate	Votes	%	±%
Independent	H.D. Griffiths	798		
Independent	Tudor Noel Evans*	669		
Independent hold		Swing		

=== St Ishmaels ===
St Ishmaels 1967
Party	Candidate	Votes	%	±%
Independent	E.T. Davies	825		
Labour	Bernard Bright	469		
Independent hold		Swing		

=== Trelech ===
Trelech 1964
Party	Candidate	Votes	%	±%
Independent	J.R. Davies*	unopposed		
Independent hold		Swing		

=== Trimsaran ===
Trimsaran 1967
Party	Candidate	Votes	%	±%
Labour	Samuel T. Hughes*	859		
Plaid Cymru	C. Phillips	393		
Labour hold		Swing		

=== Westfa ===
Westfa 1967
Party	Candidate	Votes	%	±%
Labour	Emrys Aubrey**	685		
Plaid Cymru	D.A. Pugh	612		
Labour hold		Swing		

=== Whitland ===
Whitland 1967
Party	Candidate	Votes	%	±%
Independent	H.G. James	563		
Independent	W.S. Cole*	545		
Independent hold		Swing		

== Election of aldermen ==
In addition to the 59 councillors the council consisted of 19 county aldermen. Aldermen were elected by the council, and served a six-year term. Following the elections, the majority of the aldermanic seats were taken by Labour.
