= 1958 Carmarthenshire County Council election =

Welsh local election

An election to the Carmarthenshire County Council was held in April 1958. It was preceded by the 1955 election and followed, by the 1961 election.

== Overview of the result ==
A close run election resulted in Labour narrowly regaining control of the authority. The Carmarthen Journal bemoaned the lack of organization amongst the Independents, compared with Labour and referred to the haphazard methods of nomination, particularly in rural areas. Labour took all nine aldermanic vacancies.

== Boundary changes ==
There were no boundary changes at this election.

== Retiring aldermen ==
A number of retiring councilors stood down to allow retiring aldermen to be returned unopposed. These included a Plaid Cymru councilor at Ammanford in favour of retiring Labour alderman, John Harries.

== Unopposed returns ==
There were more unopposed returns than in any previous election, according to one local newspaper. In Llanelli, where many wards had been closely contested at previous county elections, Labour candidates were returned unopposed in all nine divisions. These included the No.1 Ward which had been held by an Independent in the previous council.

== Contested elections ==
In the few contests that took place very few seats changed hands. In Carmarthen, an Independent councilor was defeated by a Ratepayer candidate.

== Results ==
59 councillors were elected.

== Ward results ==
=== Abergwili ===
Abergwili 1958
Party	Candidate	Votes	%	±%
Independent	William John Phillips*	unopposed		
Independent hold		Swing		

=== Ammanford No.1 ===
Ammanford No.1 1958
Party	Candidate	Votes	%	±%
Labour	Frank Davies**	unopposed		
Labour hold		Swing		

=== Ammanford No.2 ===
Ammanford No.2 1958
Party	Candidate	Votes	%	±%
Labour	John Harries**	unopposed		
Labour gain from Plaid Cymru		Swing		

=== Berwick ===
Berwick 1958
Party	Candidate	Votes	%	±%
Labour	William Isaac Daniel*	unopposed		
Labour hold		Swing		

=== Burry Port East ===
Burry Port East 1958
Party	Candidate	Votes	%	±%
Labour	Edward Lewis*	unopposed		
Labour hold		Swing		

=== Burry Port West ===
Burry Port West 1958
Party	Candidate	Votes	%	±%
Labour	Labor Dennis*	unopposed		
Labour hold		Swing		

=== Caio ===
Caio 1958
Party	Candidate	Votes	%	±%
Independent	Thomas Davies	462		
Independent	Thomas Rees Griffiths*	373		
Independent hold		Swing		

=== Carmarthen Division 1 ===
Carmarthen Division 1 1958
Party	Candidate	Votes	%	±%
Labour	George V. Davies*	1,635		
Ratepayers	R. Turnham	700		
Labour hold		Swing		

=== Carmarthen Division 2 ===
Carmarthen Division 2 1958
Party	Candidate	Votes	%	±%
Independent	David Mansel Thomas*	unopposed		
Independent hold		Swing		

=== Carmarthen Division 3 ===
Carmarthen Division 3 1958
Party	Candidate	Votes	%	±%
Ratepayers	Graham Jones	710		
Independent	D. Denzil Harries*	508		
Labour	Tom Hughes Griffiths	363		
Ratepayers gain from Independent		Swing		

=== Cenarth ===
Cenarth 1958
Party	Candidate	Votes	%	±%
Independent	D.G. James Jones*	unopposed		
Independent hold		Swing		

=== Cilycwm ===
Cilycwm 1958
Party	Candidate	Votes	%	±%
Independent	T.H. McQuire*	unopposed		
Independent hold		Swing		

=== Conwil ===
Conwil 1958
Party	Candidate	Votes	%	±%
Independent	D.J. Richards*	unopposed		
Independent hold		Swing		

=== Cwmamman ===
Cwmamman 1958
Party	Candidate	Votes	%	±%
Labour	Rev. Oswald Rees Davies*	unopposed		
Labour hold		Swing		

=== Felinfoel ===
Felinfoel 1958
Party	Candidate	Votes	%	±%
Labour	Arthur Cledwyn Francis*	unopposed		
Labour hold		Swing		

=== Hengoed ===
Hengoed 1958
Party	Candidate	Votes	%	±%
Labour	D.J. Stone**	786		
Independent	J.G. Wilkins	451		
Labour hold		Swing		

=== Kidwelly ===
Kidwelly 1958
Party	Candidate	Votes	%	±%
Labour	G.O. Williams	870		
Independent	Mrs G. Rees	568		
Labour hold		Swing		

=== Laugharne ===
Laugharne 1958
Party	Candidate	Votes	%	±%
Independent	Tudor H. Fleming Williams*	unopposed		
Independent hold		Swing		

=== Llanarthney ===
Llanarthney 1958
Party	Candidate	Votes	%	±%
Labour	W. Edgar Lewis**	unopposed		
Labour hold		Swing		

=== Llanboidy ===
Llanboidy 1958
Party	Candidate	Votes	%	±%
Independent	William Joshua Phillips*	unopposed		
Independent hold		Swing		

=== Llandebie North ===
Llandebie North 1958
Party	Candidate	Votes	%	±%
Labour	Gwilym R. Thomas**	1,100		
Independent	Clifford Phillips	717		
Labour hold		Swing		

=== Llandebie South ===
Llandebie South 1958
Party	Candidate	Votes	%	±%
Labour	Evan Bevan**	unopposed		
Labour hold		Swing		

=== Llandilo Rural ===
Llandilo Rural 1958
Party	Candidate	Votes	%	±%
Independent	David Marlais Humphreys*	700		
Independent	G.M. Morris	448		
Labour	D.L. Small	394		
Independent hold		Swing		

=== Llandilo Urban ===
Llandilo Urban 1958
Party	Candidate	Votes	%	±%
Independent	Marie Ann Lewis*	569		
Independent	John Oswald Elfryn Thomas	339		
Independent hold		Swing		

=== Llandovery ===
Llandovery 1958
Party	Candidate	Votes	%	±%
Independent	William J. Davies*	unopposed		
Independent hold		Swing		

=== Llandyssilio ===
Llandyssilio 1958
Party	Candidate	Votes	%	±%
Independent	H.H. Harries*	unopposed		
Independent hold		Swing		

=== Llanedy ===
Llanedy 1958
Party	Candidate	Votes	%	±%
Labour	Gwyn Howells*	unopposed		
Labour hold		Swing		

=== Llanegwad ===
Llanegwad 1958
Party	Candidate	Votes	%	±%
Independent	M.I. Griffiths*	unopposed		
Independent hold		Swing		

=== Llanelly Division 1 ===
Llanelly Division 1 1958
Party	Candidate	Votes	%	±%
Labour	Dr H.D. Llewellyn	unopposed		
Labour gain from Independent		Swing		

=== Llanelly Division 2 ===
Llanelly Division 2 1958
Party	Candidate	Votes	%	±%
Labour	William T. Griffiths*	unopposed		
Labour hold		Swing		

=== Llanelly Division 3 ===
Llanelly Division 3 1958
Party	Candidate	Votes	%	±%
Labour	Mrs Claudia R. Rees*	unopposed		
Labour hold		Swing		

=== Llanelly Division 4 ===
Llanelly Division 4 1958
Party	Candidate	Votes	%	±%
Labour	Mrs Loti Rees Hughes*	unopposed		
Labour hold		Swing		

=== Llanelly Division 5 ===
Llanelly Division 5 1958
Party	Candidate	Votes	%	±%
Labour	Sidney Lewis*	unopposed		
Labour hold		Swing		

=== Llanelly Division 6 ===
Llanelly Division 6 1958
Party	Candidate	Votes	%	±%
Labour	William J. Davies*	unopposed		
Labour hold		Swing		

=== Llanelly Division 7 ===
Llanelly Division 7 1958
Party	Candidate	Votes	%	±%
Labour	J. Llewellyn Evans*	unopposed		
Labour hold		Swing		

=== Llanelly Division 8 ===
Llanelly Division 8 1958
Party	Candidate	Votes	%	±%
Labour	George M. McConkey*	unopposed		
Labour hold		Swing		

=== Llanelly Division 9 ===
Llanelly Division 9 1958
Party	Candidate	Votes	%	±%
Labour	Sidney Ivor Thomas*	unopposed		
Labour hold		Swing		

=== Llanfihangel Aberbythych ===
Llanfihangel Aberbythych 1958
Party	Candidate	Votes	%	±%
Independent	David Ivor James Evans*	690		
Labour	Thomas Peregrine	347		
Independent hold		Swing		

=== Llanfihangel-ar-Arth ===
Llanfihangel-ar-Arth 1958
Party	Candidate	Votes	%	±%
Independent	Ivor Thomas Davies*	unopposed		
Independent hold		Swing		

=== Llangadog ===
Llangadog 1958
Party	Candidate	Votes	%	±%
Independent	D.T. Williams*	689		
Independent	William Jones	379		
Independent hold		Swing		

=== Llangeler ===
Llangeler 1958
Party	Candidate	Votes	%	±%
Independent	John Evans	unopposed		
Independent hold		Swing		

=== Llangendeirne ===
Llangendeirne 1958
Party	Candidate	Votes	%	±%
Labour	Rev R.G. James*	981		
Independent	R.O. Williams	513		
Labour hold		Swing		

=== Llangennech ===
Llangennech 1958
Party	Candidate	Votes	%	±%
Labour	John William Boyles*	859		
Plaid Cymru	Mrs C.E. Beasley	147		
Labour hold		Swing		

=== Llangunnor ===
Llangunnor 1958
Party	Candidate	Votes	%	±%
Independent	John Dobson Phelps*	unopposed		
Independent hold		Swing		

=== Llanon ===
Llanon 1958
Party	Candidate	Votes	%	±%
Labour	Sidney Jones*	unopposed		
Labour hold		Swing		

=== Llansawel ===
Llansawel 1958
Party	Candidate	Votes	%	±%
Independent	John Morgan*	unopposed		
Independent hold		Swing		

=== Llanstephan ===
Llanstephan 1958
Party	Candidate	Votes	%	±%
Independent	J.H. Davies*	unopposed		
Independent hold		Swing		

=== Llanybyther ===
Llanybyther 1958
Party	Candidate	Votes	%	±%
Independent	Benjamin Edward Davies*	unopposed		
Independent hold		Swing		

=== Myddfai ===
Myddfai 1958
Party	Candidate	Votes	%	±%
Independent	Morgan Lewis Jones*	unopposed		
Independent hold		Swing		

=== Pembrey ===
Pembrey 1958
Party	Candidate	Votes	%	±%
Labour	Simon John Elwyn Samuel*	unopposed		
Labour hold		Swing		

=== Pontyberem ===
Pontyberem 1958
Party	Candidate	Votes	%	±%
Labour	David John Jones*	unopposed		
Labour hold		Swing		

=== Quarter Bach ===
Quarter Bach 1958
Party	Candidate	Votes	%	±%
Labour	Josiah Jones*	unopposed		
Labour hold		Swing		

=== Rhydcymerau ===
Rhydcymerau 1958
Party	Candidate	Votes	%	±%
Independent	David Arthur Evans*	unopposed		
Independent hold		Swing		

=== St Clears ===
St Clears 1958
Party	Candidate	Votes	%	±%
Independent	T.E. Williams*	unopposed		
Independent hold		Swing		

=== St Ishmaels ===
St Ishmaels 1958
Party	Candidate	Votes	%	±%
Independent	Morgan Thomas Evans*	unopposed		
Independent hold		Swing		

=== Trelech ===
Trelech 1958
Party	Candidate	Votes	%	±%
Independent	Stephen Davies*	unopposed		
Independent hold		Swing		

=== Trimsaran ===
Trimsaran 1958
Party	Candidate	Votes	%	±%
Labour	Samuel T. Hughes*	unopposed		
Labour hold		Swing		

=== Westfa ===
Westfa 1958
Party	Candidate	Votes	%	±%
Labour		unopposed		
Labour hold		Swing		

=== Whitland ===
Whitland 1958
Party	Candidate	Votes	%	±%
Independent	W.S. Cole	650		
Independent	J.I. Davies*	373		
Labour	R.S. Webb	223		
Independent hold		Swing		

== Election of aldermen ==
In addition to the 59 councillors the council consisted of 19 county aldermen. Aldermen were elected by the council, and served a six-year term. Following the elections, the majority of the aldermanic vacancies were taken by Labour.

== By-elections ==
Following the selection of aldermen the following by-elections were held.

=== Ammanford No.1 by-election ===
Ammanford No.1 by-election 1958
Party	Candidate	Votes	%	±%
Labour	Haydn Lewis*	983		
Ratepayers	David Howard Cooke	910		
Labour hold		Swing		

=== Ammanford No.2 by-election ===
Ammanford No.2 by-election 1958
Party	Candidate	Votes	%	±%
Labour	Thomas Elias Evans	983		
Plaid Cymru	D.S. Gwynfor Evans*	742		
Labour hold		Swing		

=== Hengoed by-election ===
Hengoed by-election 1958
Party	Candidate	Votes	%	±%
Labour	Edgar S. Samuel*	615		
Independent	J.G. Wilkins	472		
Labour hold		Swing		

=== Llandybie North by-election ===
Llandybie North by-election 1958
Party	Candidate	Votes	%	±%
Labour	William Morris*	1,124		
Independent	Clifford Phillips	650		
Labour hold		Swing		

=== Llanelly No.2 by-election ===
Llanelly No.2 by-election 1958
Party	Candidate	Votes	%	±%
Labour	Brinley Owen	620		
Communist	R.E. Hitchon	37		
Labour hold		Swing		

=== Llanelly No.7 by-election ===
Llanelly No.7 by-election 1958
Party	Candidate	Votes	%	±%
Labour	David J. Williams	822		
Communist	Brinley Jones	28		
Labour hold		Swing		
