= 1964 Carmarthenshire County Council election =

Welsh local election

An election to the Carmarthenshire County Council was held in April 1964. It was preceded by the 1961 election and followed by the 1967 election.

== Overview of the result ==
As in previous years there was a close run election. Labour had increased their majority by taking up 15 of the 19 aldermanic seats following the previous two elections.

== Boundary changes ==
There were no boundary changes at this election.

== Retiring aldermen ==
A number of retiring Labour councillors stood down to allow retiring aldermen to be returned unopposed.

== Unopposed returns ==
A large number of members were again returned unopposed.

== Contested elections ==
Of the contests that took place, the most heated was in Llanarthney, where Labour Alderman Edgar Lewis, a member of the authority since 1931 (and who had not faced a contested election since the 1930s) was opposed by Ratepayer Austin Griffiths, a retired colonial officer who had captured the seat at a by-election.

In St Ishmaels, Labour councillor C.J. Burgess, who had won the seat by a narrow margin at the previous election, had left the Labour group shortly before the election, but narrowly held the seat against another labour candidate.

== Summary of results ==
This section summarises the detailed results which are noted in the following sections. This table summarises the result of the elections in all wards. 59 councillors were elected.

Carmarthenshire County Council 1964: elected members
| Party | Seats | Gains | Losses | Net gain/loss | Seats % | Votes % | Votes | +/− |
|---|---|---|---|---|---|---|---|---|
| Labour | 30 | | | | | | | |
| Independent | 27 | | | | | | | |
| Plaid Cymru | 1 | | | | | | | |
| Ratepayers | 1 | | | | | | | |

Carmarthenshire County Council 1964 : following election of new aldermen
| Party | Seats | Gains | Losses | Net gain/loss | Seats % | Votes % | Votes | +/− |
|---|---|---|---|---|---|---|---|---|
| Labour | | | | | | | | |
| Plaid Cymru | | | | | | | | |
| Independent | | | | | | | | |

Carmarthenshire County Council 1964 : following election of new aldermen and by-elections
| Party | Seats | Gains | Losses | Net gain/loss | Seats % | Votes % | Votes | +/− |
|---|---|---|---|---|---|---|---|---|
| Labour | | | | | | | | |
| Plaid Cymru | | | | | | | | |
| Independent | | | | | | | | |

== Ward results ==
=== Abergwili ===
Abergwili 1964
| Party | Candidate | Votes | % | ±% |
|---|---|---|---|---|
| Independent | William John Phillips* | unopposed | | |
| Independent hold | | Swing | | |

=== Ammanford No.1 ===
Ammanford No.1 1964
| Party | Candidate | Votes | % | ±% |
|---|---|---|---|---|
| Labour | Frank Davies** | unopposed | | |
| Labour hold | | Swing | | |

=== Ammanford No.2 ===
Ammanford No.2 1964
| Party | Candidate | Votes | % | ±% |
|---|---|---|---|---|
| Labour | Thomas Elias Evans* | 916 | | |
| Plaid Cymru | D.S. Gwynfor Evans | 470 | | |
| Labour hold | | Swing | | |

=== Berwick ===
Berwick 1964
| Party | Candidate | Votes | % | ±% |
|---|---|---|---|---|
| Labour | William Isaac Daniel* | unopposed | | |
| Labour hold | | Swing | | |

=== Burry Port East ===
Burry Port East 1964
| Party | Candidate | Votes | % | ±% |
|---|---|---|---|---|
| Labour | Labor Dennis* | 627 | | |
| Independent | A.R. Davies | 172 | | |
| Labour hold | | Swing | | |

=== Burry Port West ===
Burry Port West 1964
| Party | Candidate | Votes | % | ±% |
|---|---|---|---|---|
| Labour | A.T. Wilkins | unopposed | | |
| Labour hold | | Swing | | |

=== Caio ===
Caio 1964
| Party | Candidate | Votes | % | ±% |
|---|---|---|---|---|
| Independent | Trevor Wynne Davies | unopposed | | |
| Independent hold | | Swing | | |

=== Carmarthen Division 1 ===
Carmarthen Division 1 1964
| Party | Candidate | Votes | % | ±% |
|---|---|---|---|---|
| Labour | George V. Davies** | 1,364 | | |
| Independent | T.J. Hurley | 513 | | |
| Labour hold | | Swing | | |

=== Carmarthen Division 2 ===
Carmarthen Division 2 1964
| Party | Candidate | Votes | % | ±% |
|---|---|---|---|---|
| Independent | David Mansel Thomas* | 823 | | |
| Labour | Ellis J. Powell | 564 | | |
| Independent hold | | Swing | | |

=== Carmarthen Division 3 ===
Carmarthen Division 3 1964
| Party | Candidate | Votes | % | ±% |
|---|---|---|---|---|
| Independent | D. Denzil Harries* | unopposed | | |
| Independent hold | | Swing | | |

=== Cenarth ===
Cenarth 1964
| Party | Candidate | Votes | % | ±% |
|---|---|---|---|---|
| Independent | D.G. James Jones* | unopposed | | |
| Independent hold | | Swing | | |

=== Cilycwm ===
Cilycwm 1964
| Party | Candidate | Votes | % | ±% |
|---|---|---|---|---|
| Independent | James James* | 376 | | |
| Independent | W.D.R. Davies | 230 | | |
| Independent hold | | Swing | | |

=== Conwil ===
Conwil 1964
| Party | Candidate | Votes | % | ±% |
|---|---|---|---|---|
| Independent | W.A. Phillips* | unopposed | | |
| Independent hold | | Swing | | |

=== Cwmamman ===
Cwmamman 1964
| Party | Candidate | Votes | % | ±% |
|---|---|---|---|---|
| Labour | | unopposed | | |
| Labour hold | | Swing | | |

=== Felinfoel ===
Felinfoel 1964
| Party | Candidate | Votes | % | ±% |
|---|---|---|---|---|
| Labour | Arthur Cledwyn Francis* | unopposed | | |
| Labour hold | | Swing | | |

=== Hengoed ===
Hengoed 1964
| Party | Candidate | Votes | % | ±% |
|---|---|---|---|---|
| Labour | D.J. Stone** | unopposed | | |
| Labour hold | | Swing | | |

=== Kidwelly ===
Kidwelly 1964
| Party | Candidate | Votes | % | ±% |
|---|---|---|---|---|
| Labour | G.O. Williams* | unopposed | | |
| Labour hold | | Swing | | |

=== Laugharne ===
Laugharne 1964
| Party | Candidate | Votes | % | ±% |
|---|---|---|---|---|
| Independent | Tudor H. Fleming Williams* | unopposed | | |
| Independent hold | | Swing | | |

=== Llanarthney ===
Llanarthney 1964
| Party | Candidate | Votes | % | ±% |
|---|---|---|---|---|
| Ratepayers | T. Austin Griffiths* | 1,617 | | |
| Labour | W. Edgar Lewis** | 1,121 | | |
| Ratepayers gain from Labour | | Swing | | |

=== Llanboidy ===
Llanboidy 1964
| Party | Candidate | Votes | % | ±% |
|---|---|---|---|---|
| Independent | William Joshua Phillips* | unopposed | | |
| Independent hold | | Swing | | |

=== Llandebie North ===
Llandebie North 1964
| Party | Candidate | Votes | % | ±% |
|---|---|---|---|---|
| Labour | Gwilym R. Thomas** | unopposed | | |
| Labour hold | | Swing | | |

=== Llandebie South ===
Llandebie South 1964
| Party | Candidate | Votes | % | ±% |
|---|---|---|---|---|
| Labour | Evan Bevan** | unopposed | | |
| Labour hold | | Swing | | |

=== Llandilo Rural ===
Llandilo Rural 1964
| Party | Candidate | Votes | % | ±% |
|---|---|---|---|---|
| Independent | David Marlais Humphreys* | 732 | | |
| Labour | C.H. Davies | 622 | | |
| Independent hold | | Swing | | |

=== Llandilo Urban ===
Labour had won the seat in a by-election the previous October.

Llandilo Urban 1964
| Party | Candidate | Votes | % | ±% |
|---|---|---|---|---|
| Labour | D.W Watkin* | unopposed | | |
| Labour hold | | Swing | | |

=== Llandovery ===
Llandovery 1964
| Party | Candidate | Votes | % | ±% |
|---|---|---|---|---|
| Independent | William J. Davies* | unopposed | | |
| Independent hold | | Swing | | |

=== Llandyssilio ===
Llandyssilio 1964
| Party | Candidate | Votes | % | ±% |
|---|---|---|---|---|
| Independent | Daniel Clodwyn Thomas* | unopposed | | |
| Independent hold | | Swing | | |

=== Llanedy ===
Llanedy 1964
| Party | Candidate | Votes | % | ±% |
|---|---|---|---|---|
| Labour | T.E. Williams* | 1,284 | | |
| Plaid Cymru | Gwyn Hopkins | 280 | | |
| Labour hold | | Swing | | |

=== Llanegwad ===
Llanegwad 1964
| Party | Candidate | Votes | % | ±% |
|---|---|---|---|---|
| Independent | M.Ll. Griffiths* | unopposed | | |
| Independent hold | | Swing | | |

=== Llanelly Division 1 ===
Llanelly Division 1 1964
| Party | Candidate | Votes | % | ±% |
|---|---|---|---|---|
| Labour | Dr H.D. Llewellyn* | unopposed | | |
| Labour hold | | Swing | | |

=== Llanelly Division 2 ===
Llanelly Division 2 1964
| Party | Candidate | Votes | % | ±% |
|---|---|---|---|---|
| Labour | Brinley Owen* | 843 | | |
| Independent | W. John Thomas | 642 | | |
| Labour hold | | Swing | | |

=== Llanelly Division 3 ===
Llanelly Division 3 1964
| Party | Candidate | Votes | % | ±% |
|---|---|---|---|---|
| Labour | Eric Griffiths | unopposed | | |
| Labour hold | | Swing | | |

=== Llanelly Division 4 ===
Llanelly Division 4 1964
| Party | Candidate | Votes | % | ±% |
|---|---|---|---|---|
| Labour | Mrs M. Joseph* | 801 | | |
| Independent | D.J. Williams | 535 | | |
| Labour hold | | Swing | | |

=== Llanelly Division 5 ===
Llanelly Division 5 1964
| Party | Candidate | Votes | % | ±% |
|---|---|---|---|---|
| Independent | Gwilym Gibby | 335 | | |
| Labour | Sidney Lewis* | 266 | | |
| Independent gain from Labour | | Swing | | |

=== Llanelly Division 6 ===
Llanelly Division 6 1964
| Party | Candidate | Votes | % | ±% |
|---|---|---|---|---|
| Labour | W.J. Davies* | unopposed | | |
| Labour hold | | Swing | | |

=== Llanelly Division 7 ===
Llanelly Division 7 1964
| Party | Candidate | Votes | % | ±% |
|---|---|---|---|---|
| Labour | D.J. Williams* | 794 | | |
| Communist | R.E. Hitchon | 82 | | |
| Labour hold | | Swing | | |

=== Llanelly Division 8 ===
Llanelly Division 8 1964
| Party | Candidate | Votes | % | ±% |
|---|---|---|---|---|
| Labour | George M. McConkey* | unopposed | | |
| Labour hold | | Swing | | |

=== Llanelly Division 9 ===
Llanelly Division 9 1964
| Party | Candidate | Votes | % | ±% |
|---|---|---|---|---|
| Labour | Sidney Ivor Thomas* | 834 | | |
| Independent | W.A. Tilleke | 442 | | |
| Communist | Gerald Frederick Meyler | 36 | | |
| Labour hold | | Swing | | |

=== Llanfihangel Aberbythych ===
Llanfihangel Aberbythych 1964
| Party | Candidate | Votes | % | ±% |
|---|---|---|---|---|
| Independent | David Ivor James Evans* | unopposed | | |
| Independent hold | | Swing | | |

=== Llanfihangel-ar-Arth ===
Llanfihangel-ar-Arth 1964
| Party | Candidate | Votes | % | ±% |
|---|---|---|---|---|
| Independent | William Harry* | 674 | | |
| Independent | Daniel Rees Thomas | 352 | | |
| Independent hold | | Swing | | |

=== Llangadog ===
Llangadog 1964
| Party | Candidate | Votes | % | ±% |
|---|---|---|---|---|
| Plaid Cymru | Gwynfor Richard Evans** | Unopposed | N/A | N/A |
| Plaid Cymru hold | | | | |

=== Llangeler ===
Llangeler 1964
| Party | Candidate | Votes | % | ±% |
|---|---|---|---|---|
| Independent | John Evans | unopposed | | |
| Independent hold | | Swing | | |

=== Llangendeirne ===
Llangendeirne 1964
| Party | Candidate | Votes | % | ±% |
|---|---|---|---|---|
| Labour | Tom Evans* | unopposed | | |
| Labour hold | | Swing | | |

=== Llangennech ===
Llangennech 1964
| Party | Candidate | Votes | % | ±% |
|---|---|---|---|---|
| Labour | John William Boyles* | unopposed | | |
| Labour hold | | Swing | | |

=== Llangunnor ===
Llangunnor 1964
| Party | Candidate | Votes | % | ±% |
|---|---|---|---|---|
| Independent | John Dobson Phelps* | unopposed | | |
| Independent hold | | Swing | | |

=== Llanon ===
Llanon 1964
| Party | Candidate | Votes | % | ±% |
|---|---|---|---|---|
| Labour | David William James* | unopposed | | |
| Labour hold | | Swing | | |

=== Llansawel ===
Llansawel 1964
| Party | Candidate | Votes | % | ±% |
|---|---|---|---|---|
| Independent | John Morgan* | 288 | | |
| Independent | D.R. Williams | 235 | | |
| Independent hold | | Swing | | |

=== Llanstephan ===
Llanstephan 1964
| Party | Candidate | Votes | % | ±% |
|---|---|---|---|---|
| Independent | J.H. Davies* | unopposed | | |
| Independent hold | | Swing | | |

=== Llanybyther ===
Llanybyther 1964
| Party | Candidate | Votes | % | ±% |
|---|---|---|---|---|
| Independent | Benjamin Edward Davies* | 869 | | |
| Independent | I.H. Strand Jones | 335 | | |
| Independent hold | | Swing | | |

=== Myddfai ===
Myddfai 1964
| Party | Candidate | Votes | % | ±% |
|---|---|---|---|---|
| Independent | Morgan Lewis Jones* | 261 | | |
| Independent | Samuel Christmas Price | 195 | | |
| Independent hold | | Swing | | |

=== Pembrey ===
Pembrey 1964
| Party | Candidate | Votes | % | ±% |
|---|---|---|---|---|
| Labour | G.P. Evans* | unopposed | | |
| Labour hold | | Swing | | |

=== Pontyberem ===
Pontyberem 1964
| Party | Candidate | Votes | % | ±% |
|---|---|---|---|---|
| Labour | David John Jones* | unopposed | | |
| Labour hold | | Swing | | |

=== Quarter Bach ===
Quarter Bach 1964
| Party | Candidate | Votes | % | ±% |
|---|---|---|---|---|
| Labour | Josiah Jones* | unopposed | | |
| Labour hold | | Swing | | |

=== Rhydcymerau ===
Rhydcymerau 1964
| Party | Candidate | Votes | % | ±% |
|---|---|---|---|---|
| Independent | David Arthur Evans* | unopposed | | |
| Independent hold | | Swing | | |

=== St Clears ===
St Clears 1964
| Party | Candidate | Votes | % | ±% |
|---|---|---|---|---|
| Independent | Tudor Noel Evans | 893 | | |
| Independent | Rev W.J. Rees* | 589 | | |
| Independent hold | | Swing | | |

=== St Ishmaels ===
Burgess had been elected as a Labour candidate in 1961

St Ishmaels 1964
| Party | Candidate | Votes | % | ±% |
|---|---|---|---|---|
| Independent | C.J. Burgess* | 587 | | |
| Labour | Bernard Bright | 555 | | |
| Independent hold | | Swing | | |

=== Trelech ===
Trelech 1964
| Party | Candidate | Votes | % | ±% |
|---|---|---|---|---|
| Independent | J.R. Davies* | unopposed | | |
| Independent hold | | Swing | | |

=== Trimsaran ===
Trimsaran 1964
| Party | Candidate | Votes | % | ±% |
|---|---|---|---|---|
| Labour | Samuel T. Hughes* | unopposed | | |
| Labour hold | | Swing | | |

=== Westfa ===
Westfa 1964
| Party | Candidate | Votes | % | ±% |
|---|---|---|---|---|
| Labour | W.J. Franklyn Thomas* | 827 | | |
| Plaid Cymru | D.B. Thomas | 383 | | |
| Labour hold | | Swing | | |

=== Whitland ===
Whitland 1964
| Party | Candidate | Votes | % | ±% |
|---|---|---|---|---|
| Independent | W.S. Cole* | 650 | | |
| Independent | H.G. James | 388 | | |
| Independent hold | | Swing | | |

== Election of aldermen ==
In addition to the 59 councillors the council consisted of 19 county aldermen. Aldermen were elected by the council, and served a six-year term. Following the elections, the majority of the aldermanic seats were taken by Labour.
