= 1961 Carmarthenshire County Council election =

Welsh local election

An election to the Carmarthenshire County Council was held in April 1961. It was preceded by the 1958 election and followed, by the 1964 election.

== Overview of the result ==
A close run election resulted in Labour increasing its majority by two after capturing an additional two seats. In addition, Labour took the majority of the aldermanic vacancies.

== Boundary changes ==
There were no boundary changes at this election.

== Retiring aldermen ==
A number of retiring councilors stood down to allow retiring aldermen to be returned unopposed. These included D.T. Williams at Llangadog, who stood down in favour of Gwynfor Evans.

== Unopposed returns ==
39 members were returned unopposed, including six of the nine members in Llanelli town.

== Contested elections ==
20 contests took place.

== Results ==
59 councillors were elected.

== Ward results ==
=== Abergwili ===
Abergwili 1961
Party	Candidate	Votes	%	±%
Independent	William John Phillips*	unopposed		
Independent hold		Swing		

=== Ammanford No.1 ===
Ammanford No.1 1961
Party	Candidate	Votes	%	±%
Labour	Haydn Lewis*	unopposed		
Labour hold		Swing		

=== Ammanford No.2 ===
Ammanford No.2 1961
Party	Candidate	Votes	%	±%
Labour	Thomas E. Evans*	unopposed		
Labour hold		Swing		

=== Berwick ===
Berwick 1961
Party	Candidate	Votes	%	±%
Labour	William Isaac Daniel*			
Plaid Cymru	David Hubert Evans			
Labour hold		Swing		

=== Burry Port East ===
Burry Port East 1961
Party	Candidate	Votes	%	±%
Labour	Edward Lewis*	unopposed		
Labour hold		Swing		

=== Burry Port West ===
Burry Port West 1961
Party	Candidate	Votes	%	±%
Labour	Labor Dennis*	unopposed		
Labour hold		Swing		

=== Caio ===
Caio 1961
Party	Candidate	Votes	%	±%
Independent		unopposed		
Independent hold		Swing		

=== Carmarthen Division 1 ===
Carmarthen Division 1 1961
Party	Candidate	Votes	%	±%
Labour	George V. Davies*	Unopposed		
Labour hold		Swing		

=== Carmarthen Division 2 ===
Carmarthen Division 2 1961
Party	Candidate	Votes	%	±%
Independent	David Mansel Thomas*	656		
Labour	David Owen	626		
Independent hold		Swing		

=== Carmarthen Division 3 ===
Carmarthen Division 3 1961
Party	Candidate	Votes	%	±%
Independent	D. Denzil Harries	748		
Ratepayers Association	Graham Jones*	562		
Independent gain from Ratepayers		Swing		

=== Cenarth ===
Cenarth 1961
Party	Candidate	Votes	%	±%
Independent	D.G. James Jones*	unopposed		
Independent hold		Swing		

=== Cilycwm ===
Cilycwm 1961
Party	Candidate	Votes	%	±%
Independent	James James	331		
Independent	Thomas L. Jones	300		
Independent hold		Swing		

=== Conwil ===
Conwil 1961
Party	Candidate	Votes	%	±%
Independent	W.A. Phillips**	unopposed		
Independent hold		Swing		

=== Cwmamman ===
Cwmamman 1961
Party	Candidate	Votes	%	±%
Labour	Rev. Oswald Rees Davies*	unopposed		
Labour hold		Swing		

=== Felinfoel ===
Felinfoel 1961
Party	Candidate	Votes	%	±%
Labour	Arthur Cledwyn Francis*	unopposed		
Labour hold		Swing		

=== Hengoed ===
Hengoed 1961
Party	Candidate	Votes	%	±%
Labour	Edgar S. Samuel*	unopposed		
Labour hold		Swing		

=== Kidwelly ===
Kidwelly 1961
Party	Candidate	Votes	%	±%
Labour	G.O. Williams*	880		
Plaid Cymru	W. Morris	507		
Labour hold		Swing		

=== Laugharne ===
Laugharne 1961
Party	Candidate	Votes	%	±%
Independent	Tudor H. Fleming Williams*	unopposed		
Independent hold		Swing		

=== Llanarthney ===
Llanarthney 1961
Party	Candidate	Votes	%	±%
Labour	D.M. Davies*	unopposed		
Labour hold		Swing		

=== Llanboidy ===
Llanboidy 1961
Party	Candidate	Votes	%	±%
Independent	William Joshua Phillips*	unopposed		
Independent hold		Swing		

=== Llandebie North ===
Llandebie North 1961
Party	Candidate	Votes	%	±%
Labour	William Morris*	unopposed		
Labour hold		Swing		

=== Llandebie South ===
Llandebie South 1961
Party	Candidate	Votes	%	±%
Labour	Idris Evans*	1,242		
Independent	J.R. Griffiths	372		
Labour hold		Swing		

=== Llandilo Rural ===
Llandilo Rural 1961
Party	Candidate	Votes	%	±%
Independent	David Marlais Humphreys*	unopposed		
Independent hold		Swing		

=== Llandilo Urban ===
Llandilo Urban 1961
Party	Candidate	Votes	%	±%
Independent	D'Arcy Lewis Duckfield*	499		
Labour	W.D. Watkins	488		
Independent hold		Swing		

=== Llandovery ===
Llandovery 1961
Party	Candidate	Votes	%	±%
Independent	William J. Davies*	unopposed		
Independent hold		Swing		

=== Llandyssilio ===
Llandyssilio 1961
Party	Candidate	Votes	%	±%
Independent	Daniel Clodwyn Thomas	448		
Independent	H.H. Harries*			
Labour	Ifor Walter Morgan	85		
Independent hold		Swing		

=== Llanedy ===
Llanedy 1961
Party	Candidate	Votes	%	±%
Labour	W. John Evans*	1,635		
Independent	Rev D. Cynddylan Jones	673		
Labour hold		Swing		

=== Llanegwad ===
Llanegwad 1961
Party	Candidate	Votes	%	±%
Independent	M.I. Griffiths*	unopposed		
Independent hold		Swing		

=== Llanelly Division 1 ===
Llanelly Division 1 1961
Party	Candidate	Votes	%	±%
Labour	Dr H.D. Llewellyn*	1,471		
Independent	W. John Thomas	993		
Labour hold		Swing		

=== Llanelly Division 2 ===
Llanelly Division 2 1961
Party	Candidate	Votes	%	±%
Labour	Brinley Owen*	unopposed		
Labour hold		Swing		

=== Llanelly Division 3 ===
Llanelly Division 3 1961
Party	Candidate	Votes	%	±%
Labour	Mrs Claudia R. Rees*	unopposed		
Labour hold		Swing		

=== Llanelly Division 4 ===
Llanelly Division 4 1961
Party	Candidate	Votes	%	±%
Labour	Mrs Loti Rees Hughes*	unopposed		
Labour hold		Swing		

=== Llanelly Division 5 ===
Llanelly Division 5 1961
Party	Candidate	Votes	%	±%
Labour	Sidney Lewis*			
Independent	Gwilym Gibby	288		
Labour hold		Swing		

=== Llanelly Division 6 ===
Llanelly Division 6 1961
Party	Candidate	Votes	%	±%
Labour	William Douglas Hughes**	unopposed		
Labour hold		Swing		

=== Llanelly Division 7 ===
Llanelly Division 7 1961
Party	Candidate	Votes	%	±%
Labour	D.J. Williams*	unopposed		
Labour hold		Swing		

=== Llanelly Division 8 ===
Llanelly Division 8 1961
Party	Candidate	Votes	%	±%
Labour	George M. McConkey*	667		
Independent	Fred Howells	498		
Labour hold		Swing		

=== Llanelly Division 9 ===
Llanelly Division 9 1961
Party	Candidate	Votes	%	±%
Labour	Sidney Ivor Thomas*	unopposed		
Labour hold		Swing		

=== Llanfihangel Aberbythych ===
Llanfihangel Aberbythych 1961
Party	Candidate	Votes	%	±%
Independent	David Ivor James Evans*	unopposed		
Independent hold		Swing		

=== Llanfihangel-ar-Arth ===
Llanfihangel-ar-Arth 1961
Party	Candidate	Votes	%	±%
Independent	William Harry	586		
Independent	Ivor Thomas Davies*	487		
Independent hold		Swing		

=== Llangadog ===
Llangadog 1961
Party	Candidate	Votes	%	±%
Plaid Cymru	Gwynfor Richard Evans**	Unopposed	N/A	N/A
Plaid Cymru gain from Independent				

=== Llangeler ===
Llangeler 1961
Party	Candidate	Votes	%	±%
Independent	John Evans	unopposed		
Independent hold		Swing		

=== Llangendeirne ===
Llangendeirne 1961
Party	Candidate	Votes	%	±%
Labour	Rev R.G. James*	unopposed		
Labour hold		Swing		

=== Llangennech ===
Llangennech 1961
Party	Candidate	Votes	%	±%
Labour	John William Boyles*	1,117		
Plaid Cymru	Mrs C.E. Beasley	526		
Labour hold		Swing		

=== Llangunnor ===
Llangunnor 1961
Party	Candidate	Votes	%	±%
Independent	John Dobson Phelps*	909		
Ratepayers	John S. Thomas	214		
Independent hold		Swing		

=== Llanon ===
Labour had lost this ward in a by-election.

Llanon 1961
Party	Candidate	Votes	%	±%
Labour	David William Jenkins	1,379		
Independent	Clifford Jenkins*	1,228		
Labour gain from Independent		Swing		

=== Llansawel ===
Llansawel 1961
Party	Candidate	Votes	%	±%
Independent	John Morgan*	unopposed		
Independent hold		Swing		

=== Llanstephan ===
Llanstephan 1961
Party	Candidate	Votes	%	±%
Independent	J.H. Davies*	unopposed		
Independent hold		Swing		

=== Llanybyther ===
Llanybyther 1961
Party	Candidate	Votes	%	±%
Independent	Benjamin Edward Davies*	792		
Independent Labour	Thomas Davies	580		
Independent hold		Swing		

=== Myddfai ===
Myddfai 1961
Party	Candidate	Votes	%	±%
Independent	Morgan Lewis Jones*	unopposed		
Independent hold		Swing		

=== Pembrey ===
Pembrey 1961
Party	Candidate	Votes	%	±%
Labour	Simon John Elwyn Samuel*	unopposed		
Labour hold		Swing		

=== Pontyberem ===
Pontyberem 1961
Party	Candidate	Votes	%	±%
Labour	David John Jones*	unopposed		
Labour hold		Swing		

=== Quarter Bach ===
Quarter Bach 1961
Party	Candidate	Votes	%	±%
Labour	Josiah Jones*	unopposed		
Labour hold		Swing		

=== Rhydcymerau ===
Rhydcymerau 1961
Party	Candidate	Votes	%	±%
Independent	David Arthur Evans*	unopposed		
Independent hold		Swing		

=== St Clears ===
St Clears 1961
Party	Candidate	Votes	%	±%
Independent	Rev W.J. Rees*	769		
Independent	Tudor N. Evans	707		
Independent hold		Swing		

=== St Ishmaels ===
St Ishmaels 1961
Party	Candidate	Votes	%	±%
Labour	C.J. Burgess	648		
Independent	Major J.R.P. Thomas	639		
Independent hold		Swing		

=== Trelech ===
Trelech 1961
Party	Candidate	Votes	%	±%
Independent	S.O. Thomas**	unopposed		
Independent hold		Swing		

=== Trimsaran ===
Trimsaran 1961
Party	Candidate	Votes	%	±%
Labour	Samuel T. Hughes*	unopposed		
Labour hold		Swing		

=== Westfa ===
Westfa 1961
Party	Candidate	Votes	%	±%
Labour	Emrys Aubrey**	unopposed		
Labour hold		Swing		

=== Whitland ===
Whitland 1961
Party	Candidate	Votes	%	±%
Independent		unopposed		
Independent hold		Swing		

== Election of aldermen ==
In addition to the 59 councillors the council consisted of 19 county aldermen. Aldermen were elected by the council, and served a six-year term. Following the elections, the majority of the aldermanic seats were taken by Labour.
