= 1955 Carmarthenshire County Council election =

Welsh local election

An election to the Carmarthenshire County Council was held in April 1955. It was preceded by the 1952 election and followed, by the 1958 election.

== Overview of the result ==
After six years under Labour control, the election produced a very close result with 29 Labour candidates, 28 Independents and 2 Plaid Cymru candidates being returned after the contested elections. With the support of the two Plaid Cymru members, the Independents then proceeded to take seven of the eight aldermanic vacancies and to offer the other to the President of Plaid Cymru, Gwynfor Evans with the result that the Independent group regained control of the authority.

== Boundary changes ==
There were no boundary changes at this election.

== Retiring aldermen ==
The aldermen who retired at the election were ...

A number of retiring councilors stood down to allow retiring aldermen to be returned unopposed. These included the members for Kidwelly, Llanelly Division 2, 6 and 7, Pontyberem and Westfa. Four of these members would not be returned to the new council as the aldermen were not re-elected. At Llansawel, Alderman David Thomas withdrew rather than face a contest.

== Unopposed returns ==
39 members were returned unopposed, an increase of five compared with 1955.

== Contested elections ==
20 seats were contested. Labour defeats at St Ishmaels and one of the Llanelli wards, to Independents, and at Ammanford, to Plaid Cymru, led to their losing their majority of elected councillors.

A number of retiring aldermen stood as candidates and were returned unopposed.

== Results ==
This section summarises the detailed results which are noted in the following sections.

This table summarises the result of the elections in all wards. 59 councillors were elected.

Carmarthesnhire County Council 1955: elected members
Party	Seats	Gains	Losses	Net gain/loss	Seats %	Votes %	Votes	+/−
Labour								
Plaid Cymru								
Independent								

Carmarthenshire County Council 1955 : following election of new aldermen
Party	Seats	Gains	Losses	Net gain/loss	Seats %	Votes %	Votes	+/−
Labour								
Plaid Cymru								
Independent								

Carmarthenshire County Council 1955 : following election of new aldermen and by-elections
Party	Seats	Gains	Losses	Net gain/loss	Seats %	Votes %	Votes	+/−
Labour								
Plaid Cymru								
Independent								

== Ward results ==
=== Abergwili ===
Abergwili 1955
Party	Candidate	Votes	%	±%
Independent	William John Phillips	unopposed		
Independent hold		Swing		

=== Ammanford No.1 ===
Ammanford No.1 1955
Party	Candidate	Votes	%	±%
Labour	Haydn Lewis*	724		
Ratepayers	David Howard Cooke	597		
Labour hold		Swing		

=== Ammanford No.2 ===
Ammanford No.2 1955
Party	Candidate	Votes	%	±%
Plaid Cymru	David Samuel Gwynfor Evans	715		
Labour	Thomas Elias Evans*	684		
Plaid Cymru gain from Labour		Swing		

=== Berwick ===
Berwick 1955
Party	Candidate	Votes	%	±%
Labour	William Isaac Daniel*	unopposed		
Labour hold		Swing		

=== Burry Port East ===
Burry Port East 1955
Party	Candidate	Votes	%	±%
Labour	Edward Lewis*	unopposed		
Labour hold		Swing		

=== Burry Port West ===
Burry Port West 1955
Party	Candidate	Votes	%	±%
Labour	Labor Dennis*	unopposed		
Labour hold		Swing		

=== Caio ===
Caio 1955
Party	Candidate	Votes	%	±%
Independent	Thomas Davies*	unopposed		
Independent hold		Swing		

=== Carmarthen Division 1 ===
Carmarthen Division 1 1955
Party	Candidate	Votes	%	±%
Labour	George V. Davies*	Unopposed		
Labour hold		Swing		

=== Carmarthen Division 2 ===
Carmarthen Division 2 1955
Party	Candidate	Votes	%	±%
Independent	J.O. Morgans*	unopposed		
Independent hold		Swing		

=== Carmarthen Division 3 ===
Carmarthen Division 3 1955
Party	Candidate	Votes	%	±%
Independent	D. Denzil Harries	962		
Labour	Ellis J. Powell	531		
Independent hold		Swing		

=== Cenarth ===
Cenarth 1955
Party	Candidate	Votes	%	±%
Independent	D.G. James Jones*	unopposed		
Independent hold		Swing		

=== Cilycwm ===
Cilycwm 1955
Party	Candidate	Votes	%	±%
Independent	D.I. Lewis*	unopposed		
Independent hold		Swing		

=== Conwil ===
Conwil 1955
Party	Candidate	Votes	%	±%
Independent	W.A. Phillips*	unopposed		
Independent hold		Swing		

=== Cwmamman ===
Cwmamman 1955
Party	Candidate	Votes	%	±%
Labour	David Davies*	unopposed		
Labour hold		Swing		

=== Felinfoel ===
Felinfoel 1955
Party	Candidate	Votes	%	±%
Labour	Arthur Cledwyn Francis*	unopposed		
Labour hold		Swing		

=== Hengoed ===
Hengoed 1955
Party	Candidate	Votes	%	±%
Labour	Edgar S. Samuel*	unopposed		
Labour hold		Swing		

=== Kidwelly ===
Kidwelly 1955
Party	Candidate	Votes	%	±%
Labour	J. Amos Jones**	unopposed		
Labour hold		Swing		

=== Laugharne ===
Laugharne 1955
Party	Candidate	Votes	%	±%
Independent	Tudor H. Fleming Williams	768		
Independent	W.G. John*	636		
Independent hold		Swing		

=== Llanarthney ===
Llanarthney 1955
Party	Candidate	Votes	%	±%
Labour	D.M. Davies*	unopposed		
Labour hold		Swing		

=== Llanboidy ===
Llanboidy 1955
Party	Candidate	Votes	%	±%
Independent	William Joshua Phillips*	unopposed		
Independent hold		Swing		

=== Llandebie North ===
Llandebie North 1955
Party	Candidate	Votes	%	±%
Labour	William Morris*	unopposed		
Labour hold		Swing		

=== Llandebie South ===
Llandebie South 1955
Party	Candidate	Votes	%	±%
Labour	Samuel Roberts*	unopposed		
Labour hold		Swing		

=== Llandilo Rural ===
Llandilo Rural 1955
Party	Candidate	Votes	%	±%
Independent	David Marlais Humphreys*	866		
Independent	John Oswald Elfryn Thomas	468		
Independent hold		Swing		

=== Llandilo Urban ===
Llandilo Urban 1955
Party	Candidate	Votes	%	±%
Independent	James Morgan Davies*	unopposed		
Independent hold		Swing		

=== Llandovery ===
Llandovery 1955
Party	Candidate	Votes	%	±%
Independent	William J. Davies*			
Independent	James James	247		
Independent hold		Swing		

=== Llandyssilio ===
Llandyssilio 1955
Party	Candidate	Votes	%	±%
Independent	H.H. Harries*	unopposed		
Independent hold		Swing		

=== Llanedy ===
Llanedy 1955
Party	Candidate	Votes	%	±%
Labour	Gwyn Howells*	unopposed		
Labour hold		Swing		

=== Llanegwad ===
Llanegwad 1955
Party	Candidate	Votes	%	±%
Independent	Griffith Evans*	unopposed		
Independent hold		Swing		

=== Llanelly Division 1 ===
Llanelly Division 1 1955
Party	Candidate	Votes	%	±%
Independent	John Zammit	1,521		
Labour	Rev David Penry Jones*	888		
Independent gain from Labour		Swing		

=== Llanelly Division 2 ===
Llanelly Division 2 1955
Party	Candidate	Votes	%	±%
Labour	William T. Griffiths**	unopposed		
Labour hold		Swing		

=== Llanelly Division 3 ===
Llanelly Division 3 1955
Party	Candidate	Votes	%	±%
Labour	Mrs Claudia R. Rees*	unopposed		
Labour hold		Swing		

=== Llanelly Division 4 ===
Llanelly Division 4 1955
Party	Candidate	Votes	%	±%
Labour	Mrs Charlotte Hopkins*	unopposed		
Labour hold		Swing		

=== Llanelly Division 5 ===
Llanelly Division 5 1955
Party	Candidate	Votes	%	±%
Labour	Sidney Lewis*	381		
Independent	William Gilbert Edmunds	328		
Majority				
Labour hold		Swing		

=== Llanelly Division 6 ===
Llanelly Division 6 1955
Party	Candidate	Votes	%	±%
Labour	William Douglas Hughes**	unopposed		
Labour hold		Swing		

=== Llanelly Division 7 ===
Llanelly Division 7 1955
Party	Candidate	Votes	%	±%
Labour	J. Llewellyn Evans**	unopposed		
Labour hold		Swing		

=== Llanelly Division 8 ===
Llanelly Division 8 1955
Party	Candidate	Votes	%	±%
Labour	George M. McConkey	unopposed		
Labour hold		Swing		

=== Llanelly Division 9 ===
Llanelly Division 9 1955
Party	Candidate	Votes	%	±%
Labour	Sidney Ivor Thomas*	789		
Independent	Frederick Howells	724		
Labour hold		Swing		

=== Llanfihangel Aberbythick ===
Llanfihangel Aberbythych 1955
Party	Candidate	Votes	%	±%
Independent	Thomas John Williams*	620		
Labour	David Ivor James Evans	528		
Independent hold		Swing		

=== Llanfihangel-ar-Arth ===
Llanfihangel-ar-Arth 1955
Party	Candidate	Votes	%	±%
Independent	Ivor Thomas Davies	463		
Independent	William Harry	229		
Independent	William Morgan Davies	227		
Independent	Evan Philip Richards	175		
Independent hold		Swing		

=== Llangadog ===
Llangadog 1955
Party	Candidate	Votes	%	±%
Plaid Cymru	Gwynfor Richard Evans*	585		
Independent	William Jones	484		
Plaid Cymru hold		Swing		

=== Llangeler ===
Llangeler 1955
Party	Candidate	Votes	%	±%
Independent	John Evans	unopposed		
Independent gain from Labour		Swing		

=== Llangendeirne ===
Llangendeirne 1955
Party	Candidate	Votes	%	±%
Labour	Rev R.G. James*	unopposed		
Labour hold		Swing		

=== Llangennech ===
Llangennech 1955
Party	Candidate	Votes	%	±%
Labour	John William Boyles*	911		
Plaid Cymru	Trefor Beasley	352		
Labour hold		Swing		

=== Llangunnor ===
Llangunnor 1955
Party	Candidate	Votes	%	±%
Independent	John Dobson Phelps	916		
Independent	Thomas Griffiths	155		
Independent hold		Swing		

=== Llanon ===
Llanon 1955
Party	Candidate	Votes	%	±%
Labour	Sidney Jones*	unopposed		
Labour hold		Swing		

=== Llansawel ===
Llansawel 1955
Party	Candidate	Votes	%	±%
Independent	John Morgan	312		
Independent	Daniel Williams*	267		
Independent hold		Swing		

=== Llanstephan ===
Llanstephan 1955
Party	Candidate	Votes	%	±%
Independent	J.H. Davies*	unopposed		
Independent hold		Swing		

=== Llanybyther ===
Llanybyther 1955
Party	Candidate	Votes	%	±%
Independent	John Evans	829		
Independent	Benjamin Edward Davies*	661		
Independent hold		Swing		

=== Myddfai ===
Myddfai 1955
Party	Candidate	Votes	%	±%
Independent	Morgan Lewis Jones*	unopposed		
Independent hold		Swing		

=== Pembrey ===
Pembrey 1955
Party	Candidate	Votes	%	±%
Labour	Simon John Elwyn Samuel*	unopposed		
Labour hold		Swing		

=== Pontyberem ===
Pontyberem 1955
Party	Candidate	Votes	%	±%
Labour	David John Jones**	1,895		
Plaid Cymru	David Eirwyn Morgan	407		
Labour hold		Swing		

=== Quarter Bach ===
Quarter Bach 1955
Party	Candidate	Votes	%	±%
Labour	Josiah Jones*	unopposed		
Labour hold		Swing		

=== Rhydcymerau ===
Rhydcymerau 1955
Party	Candidate	Votes	%	±%
Independent	David Arthur Evans*	362		
Independent	Vincent Roy James	228		
Independent hold		Swing		

=== St Clears ===
St Clears 1955
Party	Candidate	Votes	%	±%
Independent	T.E. Williams*	unopposed		
Independent hold		Swing		

=== St Ishmaels ===
St Ishmaels 1955
Party	Candidate	Votes	%	±%
Independent	Morgan Thomas Evans	763		
Labour	Trevor Rhys Morris*	689		
Independent gain from Labour		Swing		

=== Trelech ===
Trelech 1955
Party	Candidate	Votes	%	±%
Independent	Simon Owen Thomas*	unopposed		
Independent hold		Swing		

=== Trimsaran ===
Trimsaran 1955
Party	Candidate	Votes	%	±%
Labour	Samuel T. Hughes*	533		
Independent Labour	William Daniel Evans	415		
Independent Labour	William Williams	256		
Labour hold		Swing		

=== Westfa ===
Westfa 1955
Party	Candidate	Votes	%	±%
Labour	Emrys Aubrey**	unopposed		
Labour hold		Swing		

=== Whitland ===
Whitland 1955
Party	Candidate	Votes	%	±%
Independent	William Hughes Mathias*	unopposed		
Independent hold		Swing		

== Election of aldermen ==
In addition to the 59 councillors the council consisted of 19 county aldermen. Aldermen were elected by the council, and served a six-year term. Following the elections, seven of the ten aldermanic vacancies were taken by the Independents and an eighth by Gwynfor Evans of Plaid Cymru, whose two representatives aligned with the Independents to guarantee their majority.

- J.M. Davies, Independent
- Thomas Davies, Independent
- Griffith Evans, Independent
- Gwynfor R. Evans, Plaid Cymru
- W.H. Mathias, Independent
- J.O. Morgans, Independent
- S.O. Thomas, Independent
- T.J. Williams, Independent
- Emrys Aubrey, Labour
- W. Douglas Hughes, Labour

== By-elections ==
Following the selection of aldermen the following by-elections were held.

=== Caio by-election ===
Caio by-election 1955
Party	Candidate	Votes	%	±%
Independent	Thomas Rees Griffiths	302		
Independent	Thomas Davies	301		
Labour	David John Jenkins	245		
Independent hold		Swing		

=== Carmarthen Division 2 by-election ===
Carmarthen Division 2 by-election 1955
Party	Candidate	Votes	%	±%
Independent	David Mansel Thomas	762		
Labour	John Brynmor Jones	530		
Independent hold		Swing		

=== Llandeilo Urban by-election ===
Llandeilo Urban by-election 1955
Party	Candidate	Votes	%	±%
Independent	Marie Ann Lewis	590		
Labour	John Oswald Elfryn Thomas	358		
Independent hold		Swing		

=== Llanegwad by-election ===
Llanegwad by-election 1955
Party	Candidate	Votes	%	±%
Independent	Thomas Llewellyn Griffiths	534		
Independent	Henry Thomas	501		
Independent hold		Swing		

=== Llanelly Division 6 by-election ===
Llanelly Division 6 by-election 1955
Party	Candidate	Votes	%	±%
Labour	W.J. Davies*	unopposed		
Labour hold		Swing		

=== Llanfihangel Aberbythych by-election ===
Llanfihangel Aberbythych by-election 1955
Party	Candidate	Votes	%	±%
Independent	David Ivor James Evans	638		
Labour	Thomas Peregrine	438		
Independent hold		Swing		

=== Llangadog by-election ===
Llangadog by-election 1955
Party	Candidate	Votes	%	±%
Independent	David Thomas Williams	561		
Independent	William Jones	534		
Independent gain from Plaid Cymru		Swing		

=== Trelech by-election ===
Trelech by-election 1955
Party	Candidate	Votes	%	±%
Independent	Stephen Davies	377		
Independent	David Trevor Davies	356		
Independent	John William Bowen	286		
Independent hold		Swing		

=== Westfa by-election ===
Westfa by-election 1955
Party	Candidate	Votes	%	±%
Labour	W.J.F. Thomas*	unopposed		
Labour hold		Swing		

=== Whitland by-election ===
Whitland by-election 1955
Party	Candidate	Votes	%	±%
Independent	John Ivor Davies	494		
Independent	William Sandbrook Cole	492		
Independent	William Stephen Richards	168		
Independent hold		Swing		
